= List of Farma (Slovak TV series) contestants =

Farma is a Slovak reality television show, first broadcast in July 2011. Contestants are called Farmers in the show, and they compete against each other to become the win 50 000 € . The series first aired in 2011. There have been five seasons, which have been filmed on five different farm. A total of 97 participants have competed.

== Quitters ==
Nikola Komorová - Season 2 - After 28 days quit.
Nikola Čajkovská - Season 3 - After 7 days quit.
Lýdia Spišáková - Season 3 - After 9 days quit.
Ivana Slabá - Season 9 - After 7 days quit.
Ján Solárik - Season 9 - After 11 days quit.
Frederika Lukyová - Season 9 - After 28 days quit.

== Removed due to Injury ==
Ľubomír Filkor - Season 2 - After 12 days.
Gabriel Sajka - Season 3 - After 9 days.
Lucia Mokráňová - Season 5 - After 38 days.
Ján Beutel - Season 5 - After 38 days.
Michal Pavlík - Season 6 - After 87 days.
Jana Hrmová - Season 7 - After 37 days.
Lenka Hrčková - Season 7 - After 56 days.
Ladislav Krajčovič - Season 9 - After 4 days.
Tomáš "Tomy Kotty" Drahoš - Season 9 - After 48 days.

== Contestants ==
All information is accurate as of the time the season was filmed, and thus may vary from season to season for returning players.

Contestant played the game for a second time

Contestant	Age	Hometown	Season	Finish
Miloš Ferleťák	33	Námestovo	Farma 1	10th
Martin Kucek	57	Bratislava	Farma 1	9th
Lenka Cabanová	36	London	Farma 1	8th
Richard Požgay	33	Bratislava	Farma 1	7th
Jakub Kušnirák	20	Poprad	Farma 1	6th
Štefan Tóth	28	Stupava	Farma 1	5th
Michal Kováčik	23	Lehota pod Vtáčnikom	Farma 1	4th
Monika Hrajnohová	22	Dunajská Streda	Farma 1	3rd
Lenka Liptáková	30	Vlková	Farma 1	Runner-up
Andrea Járová	27	Bratislava	Farma 1	Winner
Jana Frčková	45	Zvolen	Farma 2	15th
Ľubomír Filkor	46	Spišská Nová Ves	Farma 2	14th
Jarmila Ščibrányová	55	Bratislava	Farma 2	13th
Nikola Komorová	20	Bratislava	Farma 2	12th
Roman Olach	20	Partizánske	Farma 2	11th
Juraj Hambalko	29	Nové Zámky	Farma 2	10th
Roland Sedláček	31	Jelšovce	Farma 2	9th
Lucia Frčková	27	Banská Bystrica	Farma 2	8th
Gabriela Bullová	28	Šaľa	Farma 2	7th
Adam Kováč	23	Bratislava	Farma 2	6th
Monika Haklová	37	Deutsch Jahrndorf	Farma 2	5th
Eva Orolinová	19	Spišské Bystré	Farma 2	4th
Ľudovíta Mladková	31	Malacky	Farma 2	3rd
Tomáš Mrva	24	Trnava	Farma 2	Runner-up
Radomír Spireng	39	Žilina	Farma 2	Winner
Nikola Čajkovská	19	Bratislava	Farma 3	18th
Lýdia Spišáková	18	Sabinov	Farma 3	17th
Gabriel Sajka	54	Levice	Farma 3	16th
Ján Strausz	27	Košice	Farma 3	15th
Martina Štetiarová	29	Čadca	Farma 3	14th
Renáta Kovárová	42	Dunajská Lužná	Farma 3	13th
Vladimír Kovár	46	Dunajská Lužná	Farma 3	12th
L.			Farma 3	11th
Štefan Vaško	34	Stropkov	Farma 3	10th
Veronika Bohumelová	19	Bratislava	Farma 3	9th
Peter Vaculčík	20	Bratislava	Farma 3	8th
Jana Kallayová	27	Bratislava	Farma 3	7th
Tomáš Šimrák	23	Bratislava	Farma 3	6th
Edita Orosová	23	Lužianky	Farma 3	5th
Andrea Vaničková	40	Stupava	Farma 3	4th
Andrej Grelnet	39	Banská Bystrica	Farma 3	3rd
Silvia Haluzová	54	Trnava	Farma 3	Runner-up
Mário Drobný	21	Zavar	Farma 3	Winner
Pavol Horečný	54	Piešťany	Farma 4	17th
Miroslav Bačo	30	Košice	Farma 4	16th
Jindřich Sosna	35	Trebišov	Farma 4	15th
Martina Duchová	28	Spišská Nová Ves	Farma 4	14th
František Šefčík	35	Harichovce	Farma 4	13th
Peter Kuník	24	Piešťany	Farma 4	12th
Šárka Rácová	40	Uhrovec	Farma 4	11th
Kvetoslava Banyászyová	32	Veľká Ida	Farma 4	10th
Peter Čierny	35	Detva	Farma 4	9th
Henrich Fedor	41	Košice	Farma 4	8th
Ján Juhaščik	52	Svidník	Farma 4	7th
Štefan Vojtek	28	Ožďany	Farma 4	6th
Jana Hrmová	19	Bratislava	Farma 4	5th
Nikoleta Prokšová	29	Bratislava	Farma 4	4th
Veronika Pavlíková	19	Brezová pod Bradlom	Farma 4	3rd
Božena Candráková	34	Častkov	Farma 4	Runner-up
Pavol Styk	20	Oravce	Farma 4	Winner
Marek Pavlov	23	Hnúšťa	Farma 5	18th
Ľubomír Snopko	19	Čerín	Farma 5	17th
Anna Koleňáková	19	Hrušovany	Farma 5	16th
Lucia Mokráňová	22	Bratislava	Farma 5	15th
Ján Beutel	57	Poprad	Farma 5	14th
Patrik Mirga	22	Trnava	Farma 5	13th
Alžbeta Janíčková	46	Vráble	Farma 5	12th
Viktor Matz	21	Košice	Farma 5	11th
Iris Janošová	24	Bratislava	Farma 5	10th
Miriam Pribanić	53	Bratislava	Farma 5	9th
Ľuboš Jankech	37	Malženice	Farma 5	8th
Lenka Hrčková	23	Banská Bystrica	Farma 5	7th
Eva Kapusniaková	25	Tatranská Lomnica	Farma 5	6th
Jana Ivaničová	33	Buzitka	Farma 5	5th
Reza Givili	31	Senica	Farma 5	4th
Matúš Lengvarský	25	Spišská Nová Ves	Farma 5	3rd
Tibor Repa	46	Pusté Úľany	Farma 5	Runner-up
Lenka Švaralová	27	Levice	Farma 5	Winner
Ľubomír Struňák	28	Michalovce	Farma 6	19th
Ladislav Švihla	41	Štítnik	Farma 6	18th
Laura Foltínová	20	Záhorská Bystrica	Farma 6	17th
Roman Máče	44	Nitra	Farma 6	16th
Nikol Máčeová	26	Klasov	Farma 6	15th
Lívia Koristová	21	Žilina	Farma 6	14th
Nikola Ledecká	18	Podbrezová	Farma 6	13th
Ladislav Paško	20	Veľký Krtíš	Farma 6	12th
Peter Kovalič	39	Smolnícka Huta	Farma 6	11th
Daniela Nikoleta Kortišová	20	Považská Bystrica	Farma 6	10th
Stanislav Tovcimak	39	Humenné	Farma 6	9th
Michal Pavlík	18	Nitra	Farma 6	8th
Miriama Čaládyová	25	Nitra	Farma 6	7th
Katarína Cíbiková	21	Horovce	Farma 6	6th
Jana Perunková	39	Poprad	Farma 6	5th
Petra Bejdová	30	Humenné	Farma 6	4th
Gabriela Molnárová	44	Trnava	Farma 6	3rd
Jozef Kababík	21	Košice	Farma 6	Runner-up
Tomáš Mayer	31	Bratislava	Farma 6	Winner
Roman Olach	24	Partizánske	Farma 7	12th
Alžbeta Janíčková	48	Vráble	Farma 7	11th
Reza Givili	32	Bratislava	Farma 7	10th
Jana Hrmová	21	Bratislava	Farma 7	9th
Ján Juhaščík	54	Svidník	Farma 7	8th
Lenka Hrčková	25	Banská Bystrica	Farma 7	7th
Ľubomír Filkor	49	Spišská Nová Ves	Farma 7	6th
Šárka Rácová	43	Uhrovec	Farma 7	5th
Miloš Ferleťák	38	Námestovo	Farma 7	4th
Miriam Pribanić	54	Bratislava	Farma 7	3rd
Lucia Mokráňová	24	Bratislava	Farma 7	2nd
Tomáš Mrva	28	Trnava	Farma 7	1st
Jaroslav Sunega	34	Martin	Farma 8	16th
Daniela Urbanová	48	Šaľa	Farma 8	15th
Marcel Sendrei	25	Ratkovská Suchá	Farma 8	14th
Jana Brezinová	27	Trnovec nad Váhom	Farma 8	13th
Janette Hutton	43	Waltham Abbey	Farma 8	12th
Ján Raninec	57	Trenčianska Turná	Farma 8	11th
Zuzana Hrobáriková	28	Kolárovice	Farma 8	10th
Nikolas Nikolič	26	Nový Život	Farma 8	9th
Alena Lehotská	57	Spišská Nová Ves	Farma 8	8th
Roman Adamka	27	Trávnica	Farma 8	7th
Lucia Gachulincová	22	Považská Bystrica	Farma 8	6th
Milan Lalík	44	Dudince	Farma 8	5th
Vladimíra Sedláková	23	Nitrianske Hrnčiarovce	Farma 8	4th
Lucia Šindlerová	38	Opatovce nad Nitrou	Farma 8	3rd
Dávid Buška	27	Námestovo	Farma 8	2nd
Miroslav Povec	36	Spišské Tomášovce	Farma 8	1st
Ladislav Krajčovič	64	Dolná Krupá	Farma 9	21st
Ivana Slabá	20	Považská Bystrica	Farma 9	20th
Ján Solárik	47	Žilina	Farma 9	19th
Peter Poruban	29	Saint-Tropez	Farma 9	18th
Jaroslav Hudacký	37	Trebišov	Farma 9	17th
Frederika Lukyová	21	Žiar nad Hronom	Farma 9	16th
Tomáš "Tomy Kotty" Drahoš	25	Bratislava	Farma 9	15th
Lenka Botková	30	Tisovec	Farma 9	14th
Stanislav Madzík	30	Poprad	Farma 9	13th
Eva Zelníková	22	Kysucké Nové Mesto	Farma 9	12th
Dáša Sabová	31	Trenčín	Farma 9	11th
Martin Urban	26	Záhorská Bystrica	Farma 9	10th
Ivana Auxtová	32	Čierny Balog	Farma 9	9th
Miroslav Gábriš	64	Bobrovec	Farma 9	8th
Pavol Lihocký	38	Handlová	Farma 9	7th
Jozef Bohdan	40	Podlužany	Farma 9	6th
Petra Palusková	25	Prague	Farma 9	5th
Jana Volnová	47	Podhradie	Farma 9	4th
Anna Auxtová	52	Čierny Balog	Farma 9	3rd
Michala Kiripolská	25	Trnovec nad Váhom	Farma 9	2nd
Šimon Néma	26	Dolné Lefantovce	Farma 9	1st
