= Farma (Slovak TV series) =

- Genre: reality TV series
- Directed by: Peter Nuňéz (2011 - 2012); Jana Rezková (2012 - 2012); Samuel Jaško (2013-present)
- Presented by: Kveta Horváthová (2011 - 2017); Eva Kramerová (2018 - 2021); Marek Fašiang (2022-present)
- Starring: Farma contestants
- Country of origin: Slovakia
- No. of seasons: 17

Production
- Running time: 60 minutes

Original release
- Network: Markíza
- Release: July 23, 2011 – present

Farma ("The Farm") is a Slovak reality TV series broadcast on Markíza that debuted in 2011. With 18 seasons, the show is both, the longest running reality show in Slovakia, and one of the longest running versions of The Farm franchise worldwide.

The show is set in the natural surroundings of a farm. Contestants are cut off from the outside world. Every week one contestant is selected as the "Farmer of the Week" by the contestant that was previously eliminated. In the first week contestants vote to pick the Farmer of the Week. The Farmer of the Week nominates two people (man and woman) as servants. They are nominated for eviction and other contestants must vote on which of the two servants will become the first duelist. This person then picks their opponent for the duel from among the other contestants (The Farmer of the Week has immunity and cannot be selected). The person they choose will become the second duelist. The second duelist has the right to pick the order of the five disciplines the duel will consist of (e.g. knowledge quiz, tug-of-war, cutting wood). The first person to score 3 points in the duel (1 point is awarded for each discipline that they win) becomes the winner of the duel and is allowed to return to the farm.

== Seasons ==
| No. | Season title | Location | Days | Farmers | Winner | Runner(s)-up | | Final duel |
|---|---|---|---|---|---|---|---|---|
| 1 | Farma 1 | Horné Paseky, Slovakia | 42 | 10 | Andrea Járová | Lenka Liptáková | | 3–1 |
| 2 | Farma 2 | Vrbovce, Slovakia | 98 | 15 | Radomír Spireng | Tomáš Mrva | | 3–2 |
| 3 | Farma 3 | Sobotište, Slovakia | 98 | 18 | Mário Drobný | Silvia Haluzová | | 3–0 |
| 4 | Farma 4 | Podbranč, Slovakia | 105 | 17 | Pavol Styk | Božena Candráková | | 3–1 |
| 5 | Farma 5 | Ilija, Slovakia | 105 | 18 | Lenka Švaralová | Tibor Repa | | 3–1 |
| 6 | Farma 6 | Čelovce, Slovakia | 105 | 19 | Tomáš Mayer | Jozef Kababík | | 3–2 |
| 7 | Farma 7 - All-Stars | Mošovce, Slovakia | 70 | 12 | Tomáš Mrva | Lucia Mokráňová | | 3–1 |
| 8 | Farma 8 | Horný Badín, Slovakia | 91 | 16 | Miroslav Povec | Dávid Buška | | 3–1 |
| 9 | Farma 9 | Zázrivá, Slovakia | 98 | 21 | Šimon Néma | Michala Kiripolská | | 3–1 |
| 10 | Farma 10 | Sekule, Slovakia | 98 | 22 | Dominik Porubský | Milan Vysokai | Peter Harezník | 3–0–0 |
| 11 | Farma 11 - East vs West | Sekule, Slovakia | 75 | 20 | Gabriel Sedláček | Romana Košťálová | Radovan Dulin | 10–5–2 |
| 12 | Farma 12 - City vs Village | Sekule, Slovakia | 75 | 20 | Xénia Gregušová | Henrich Kuľko | Lukáš Stanislav | 10–7–5 |
| 13 | Farma 13 | Hubina, Slovakia | 75 | 21 | Miroslav Debnár | Eva Vajsová | Dávid Horák | 18–12–8 |
| 14 | Farma 14 - Alica is coming! | Dobrá Voda, Slovakia | 75 | 20 | Filip Jánoš | Martina Korkobcová | Michal Mošpan | 14–10–9 |
| 15 | Farma 15 - Generation fight | Hubina, Slovakia | 75 | 19 | Lucia Gašparíková | Nikola Škrváňová | Denis Čatlóš | 1-0-0 |
| 16 | Farma 16 - Secret mission | Modrová, Slovakia | 75 | 21 | Peter Janiga | Matúš Horváth | Hoku Kamaaina Nezdoba | 11-4-3 |
| 17 | Farma 17 - The Cursed Inheritance | Modrová, Slovakia | 75 | 23 | Roman Perašín | Richard Fabšič | Róbert Hudák | 8-5-2 |
| 18 | Farma 18 - In vino veritas | Doľany, Slovakia | 75 | TBD | | | | |
