= Farma season 4 =

Farma
- Season 4
- Presented by: Kveta Horváthová
- No. of days: 15 weeks
- No. of housemates: 17
- Winner: Pavol S.
- Runner-up: Božena
- No. of episodes: 79

Release
- Original network: Markíza
- Original release: August 25 – December 15, 2013

Season chronology
- ← Previous; Season 3 Next → Season 5

Farma 4 - Pôjde o všetko! (English: The Farm 4 - This will be an all!) is the Slovak version of The Farm reality television show based on the Swedish television series of the same name. The show filmed in July–October 2013 and premiered on August 25, 2013 on Markíza.

== Format ==
Seventeen contestants are cut out from outside world. Each week one contestant is selected the Farmer of the Week. In the first week, the contestants choose the Farmer. Since week 2, the Farmer is chosen by the contestant evicted in the previous week.

=== Nomination Process ===
The Farmer of the Week nominates two people (a man and a woman) as the Butlers. The others must decide, which Butler is the first to go to the Battle. That person than choose the second person (from the same sex) for the Battle and also the type of battle (a quiz, extrusion, endurance, sleight). The Battle winner must win two duels. The Battle loser is evicted from the game. In the live final 15 December 2013 Pavol Styk won 50 000 € . Božena Candráková finish on the second place. Pavol Styk won title Favorit Farmer.

== Contestants ==
Aages stated are at time of contest.

Contestant	Age	Background	Hometown	Status	Finish
Pavol Horečný	54	Unemployed	Piešťany	1st Evicted on Week 1	17th
Miroslav Bačo	30	Tattooist	Košice	2nd Evicted on Week 2	16th
Jindřich Sosna	35	Cop	Trebišov	3rd Evicted on Week 3	15th
Martina Duchová	28	Unemployed	Spišská Nová Ves	4th Evicted on Week 4	14th
František Šefčík	35	Salesman	Harichovce	6th Evicted on Week 6	13th
Peter Kuník	24	Waiter	Piešťany	7th Evicted on Week 7	12th
Šárka Rácová	40	Ancillary works	Uhrovec	8th Evicted on Week 8	11th
Kvetoslava Banyászyová	32	Maternity leave	Veľká Ida	9th Evicted on Week 9	10th
Peter Čierny	35	Mason	Detva	10th Evicted on Week 10	9th
Henrich Fedor	41	Cottager	Košice	11th Evicted on Week 11	8th
Ján Juhaščik	52	Electrician	Svidník	12th Evicted on Week 12	7th
Štefan Vojtek	28	Unemployed	Ožďany	13th Evicted on Week 13	6th
Jana Hrmová	19	Student	Bratislava	14th Evicted on Week 14	5th
Nikoleta Prokšová	29	Maternity leave	Bratislava	15th Evicted on Week 15	4th
Veronika Pavlíková	19	Brigadier	Brezová pod Bradlom	3rd place on Week 15	3rd
Božena Candráková	34	Unemployed	Častkov	Runner-up on Week 15	2nd
Pavol Styk	20	Brigadier	Oravce	Winner on Week 15	1st

=== Future appearances ===
Jana Hrmová, Šárka Rácová and Ján Juhaščík returned to Farma for Farma: All-Stars. Hrmová was evacuated after 37 days and placing 9th, Juhaščík and Rácová respectively placing 8th and 5th.

=== Nominations ===
	Week 1	Week 2	Week 3	Week 4	Week 5	Week 6	Week 7	Week 8	Week 9	Week 10	Week 11	Week 12	Week 13	Week 14	Week 15		Final
Farmer of the Week (Immunity)	Jana	Veronika	Jana	Šárka	Jana	Ján	Veronika	Štefan	Božena	Jana	Nikoleta	Pavol S.	Božena	Božena	Božena		None
Buttlers	Pavol H. Veronika	Miroslav; Šárka	Jindřich; Božena	František; Jana	Ján; Božena	Štefan; Veronika	Peter K. Šárka	Peter Č. Jana	Henrich; Kvetoslava	Ján; Nikoleta	Henrich; Jana	Štefan; Božena	Pavol S. Veronika	Pavol S. Veronika	Pavol S. Nikoleta	Pavol S. Veronika	None
Pavol S.												Farmer of the Week	Buttler; 1st Dueler	Buttler	Buttler	Buttler; 1st Dueler	Winner (Week 15)
Božena			Buttler		Buttler; 1st Dueler	Evicted (Week 5)			Farmer of the Week			Buttler	Farmer of the Week	Farmer of the Week	Farmer of the Week		Runner-Up (Week 15)
Veronika	Buttler	Farmer of the Week			2nd Dueler	Buttler	Farmer of the Week						Buttler	Buttler; 1st Dueler		Buttler; 2nd Dueler	3rd Place (Week 15)
Nikoleta	Not in The Farm								2nd Dueler	Buttler	Farmer of the Week				Buttler	Evicted (Week 15)	
Jana	Farmer of the Week		Farmer of the Week	Buttler; 1st Dueler	Farmer of the Week			Buttler; 1st Dueler		Farmer of the Week	Buttler			2nd Dueler	Evicted (Week 14)		
Štefan	Not in The Farm					Buttler; 1st Dueler		Farmer of the Week			2nd Dueler	Buttler; 1st Dueler	2nd Dueler	Evicted (Week 13)			
Ján		2nd Dueler	2nd Dueler		Buttler	Farmer of the Week				Buttler; 1st Dueler		2nd Dueler	Evicted (Week 12)				
Henrich	Not in The Farm								Buttler		Buttler; 1st Dueler	Evicted (Week 11)					
Peter Č.	Not in The Farm						2nd Dueler	Buttler		2nd Dueler	Evicted (Week 10)						
Kvetoslava	Not in The Farm								Buttler; 1st Dueler	Evicted (Week 9)							
Šárka		Buttler		Farmer of the Week			Buttler	2nd Dueler	Evicted (Week 8)								
Peter K.	Not in The Farm						Buttler; 1st Dueler	Evicted (Week 7)									
František	2nd Dueler			Buttler		2nd Dueler	Evicted (Week 6)										
Martina				2nd Dueler	Evicted (Week 4)												
Jindřich			Buttler; 1st Dueler	Evicted (Week 3)													
Miroslav		Buttler; 1st Dueler	Evicted (Week 2)														
Pavol H.	Buttler; 1st Dueler	Evicted (Week 1)															
1st Dueler (By Group)	Pavol H.	Miroslav	Jindřich	Jana	Božena	Štefan	Peter K.	Jana	Kvetoslava	Ján	Henrich	Štefan	Pavol S.	Veronika	None		
2nd Dueler (By 1st Dueler)	František	Ján	Ján	Martina	Veronika	František	Peter Č.	Šárka	Nikoleta	Peter Č.	Štefan	Ján	Štefan	Jana	None		
Evicted	Pavol H. Lost duel	Miroslav; Lost duel	Jindřich; Lost duel	Martina; Lost duel	Božena; Lost duel	František; Lost duel	Peter K. Lost duel	Šárka; Lost duel	Kvetoslava; Lost duel	Peter Č. Lost duel	Henrich; Lost duel	Ján; Lost duel	Štefan; Lost duel	Jana; Lost duel	Nikoleta; Voted out	Veronika; Lost duel	Božena; Runner-up; Lost final duel
Evicted	Pavol H. Lost duel	Miroslav; Lost duel	Jindřich; Lost duel	Martina; Lost duel	Božena; Lost duel	Božena; Returned	Peter K. Lost duel	Šárka; Lost duel	Kvetoslava; Lost duel	Peter Č. Lost duel	Henrich; Lost duel	Ján; Lost duel	Štefan; Lost duel	Jana; Lost duel	Nikoleta; Voted out	Veronika; Lost duel	Pavol S. Winner; Wins final duel

== The game ==
Week	Farmer of the Week	Buttlers	1st Dueler	Vote	2nd Dueler	Evicted	Finish
1	Jana	Pavol H. Veronika	Pavol H.	8-0	František	Pavol H.	1st Evicted
2	Veronika	Miroslav; Šárka	Miroslav	6-1	Ján	Miroslav	2nd Evicted
3	Jana	Jindřich; Božena	Jindřich	6-0	Ján	Jindřich	3rd Evicted
4	Šárka	František; Jana	Jana	5-0	Martina	Martina	4th Evicted
5	Jana	Ján; Božena	Božena	4-0	Veronika	Božena	5th Evicted; Day 35
6	Ján	Štefan; ~~Jana~~; Veronika	Štefan	4-1	František	Jana	Removed due to Injury
6	Ján	Štefan; ~~Jana~~; Veronika	Štefan	4-1	František	Božena	Return
6	Ján	Štefan; ~~Jana~~; Veronika	Štefan	4-1	František	František	6th Evicted
7	Veronika	Peter K. Šárka	Peter K.	6-3	Peter Č.	Jana	Return
7	Veronika	Peter K. Šárka	Peter K.	6-3	Peter Č.	Peter K.	7th Evicted
8	Štefan	Peter Č. Jana	Jana	7-1	Šárka	Šárka	8th Evicted
9	Božena	Henrich; Kvetoslava	Kvetoslava	4-3	Nikoleta	Kvetoslava	9th Evicted
10	Jana	Ján; Nikoleta	Ján	6-0	Peter Č.	Peter Č.	10th Evicted
11	Nikoleta	Henrich; Jana	Henrich	4-1	Štefan	Henrich	11th Evicted
12	Pavol S.	Štefan; Božena	Štefan	4-0	Ján	Ján	12th Evicted
13	Božena	Pavol S. Veronika	Pavol S.	2-1	Štefan	Štefan	13th Evicted
14	Božena	Pavol S. Veronika	Veronika	2-0	Jana	Jana	14th Evicted
15	Božena	Pavol S. Nikoleta	Jury's Vote	11-0	None	Nikoleta	15th Evicted
15	Božena	Pavol S. Veronika	Pavol S.	11-0	Veronika	Veronika	16th Evicted
Final Duel						Božena	Runner-up
Final Duel						Pavol S.	Winner
