= Farma season 8 =

Farma
- Season 8
- Presented by: Kveta Horváthová
- No. of days: 13 weeks
- No. of housemates: 16
- Winner: Miroslav
- Runner-up: Dávid

Release
- Original network: Markíza
- Original release: March 9 – June 18, 2017

Season chronology
- ← Previous; Season 7 Next → Season 9

Farma 8 (The Farm 8) is the 8th season of the Slovak version of The Farm reality television show based on the Swedish television series of the same name. The show was filmed from February 2017 to June 2017 and premiered on March 9, 2017 on Markíza.

== Format ==
Twelve contestants are chosen from the outside world. Each week one contestant is selected the Farmer of the Week. In the first week, the contestants choose the Farmer. Since week 2, the Farmer is chosen by the contestant evicted in the previous week.

=== Nomination process ===
The Farmer of the Week nominates two people (a man and a woman) as the Butlers. The others must decide which Butler is the first to go to the Battle. That person then chooses the second person (from the same sex) for the Battle and also the type of battle (a quiz, extrusion, endurance, sleight). The Battle winner must win two duels. The Battle loser is evicted from the game.

Ages stated are at time of contest.

Contestant	Age	Background	Hometown	Status	Finish
Jaroslav Sunega	34	Mason	Martin	1st Evicted on Week 1	16th
Daniela Urbanová	48	Social Worker	Šaľa	2nd Evicted on Week 2	15th
Marcel Sendrei	25	Worker	Ratkovská Suchá	3rd Evicted on Week 3	14th
Jana Brezinová	27	Beauty salon owner	Trnovec nad Váhom	4th Evicted on Week 4	13th
Janette Hutton	43	Aupair agency owner	Waltham Abbey	5th Evicted on Week 5	12th
Ján Raninec	57	Joiner	Trenčianska Turná	6th Evicted on Week 6	11th
Zuzana Hrobáriková	28	Maternity leave	Kolárovice	7th Evicted on Week 7	10th
Nikolas Nikolič	26	Hairstyler	Nový Život	8th Evicted on Week 8	9th
Alena Lehotská	57	E-shop seller	Spišská Nová Ves	9th Evicted on Week 9	8th
Roman Adamka	27	Unemployed	Trávnica	10th Evicted on Week 10	7th
Lucia "Lulu" Gachulincová	22	Student	Považská Bystrica	11th Evicted on Week 11	6th
Milan Lalík	44	Public order inspector	Dudince	Ejected on Week 12	5th
Vladimíra Sedláková	23	Teacher	Nitrianske Hrnčiarovce	12th Evicted on Week 13	4th
Lucia Šindlerová	38	Tavern owner	Opatovce nad Nitrou	3rd place on Week 13	3rd
Dávid Buška	27	Salesman	Námestovo	Runner-up on Week 13	2nd
Miroslav Povec	36	Joiner	Spišské Tomášovce	Winner on Week 13	1st

=== Nominations ===
	Week 1	Week 2	Week 3	Week 4	Week 5	Week 6	Week 7	Week 8	Week 9	Week 10	Week 11	Week 12	Week 13		Final
Farmer of the Week (Immunity)	Ján	Milan	Zuzana	Dávid	Miroslav	Lucia	Alena	Miroslav	Roman	Miroslav	Vladimíra	Dávid	Miroslav		None
Buttlers	Vladimíra; Jaroslav	Lucia; Miroslav	Jana; Milan	Jana; Miroslav	Janette; Dávid	Zuzana; Ján	Zuzana; Nikolas	Vladimíra; Dávid	Alena; Milan	Lulu; Milan	Lulu; Dávid	Lucia; Miroslav	Lucia; Dávid; Vladimíra	Lucia; Dávid	None
Miroslav	2nd Dueler	Buttler		Buttler	Farmer of the Week			Farmer of the Week		Farmer of the Week		Buttler	Farmer of the Week		Winner (Week 13)
Dávid				Farmer of the Week	Buttler			Buttler; 1st Dueler			Buttler	Farmer of the Week	Buttler	Buttler; 2nd Dueler	Runner-Up (Week 13)
Lucia		Buttler; 1st Dueler				Farmer of the Week					2nd Dueler	Buttler; 1st Dueler	Buttler	Buttler; 1st Dueler	3rd Place (Week 13)
Vladimíra	Buttler						2nd Dueler	Buttler			Farmer of the Week	2nd Dueler	Buttler	Evicted (Week 13)	
Milan		Farmer of the Week	Buttler; 1st Dueler						Buttler	Buttler; 1st Dueler			Ejected (Week 12)		
Lulu	Not in The Farm								2nd Dueler	Buttler	Buttler; 1st Dueler	Evicted (Week 11)			
Roman	Not in The Farm								Farmer of the Week	2nd Dueler	Evicted (Week 10)				
Alena	Not in The Farm						Farmer of the Week		Buttler; 1st Dueler	Evicted (Week 9)					
Nikolas	Not in The Farm					2nd Dueler	Buttler	2nd Dueler	Evicted (Week 8)						
Zuzana			Farmer of the Week		2nd Dueler	Buttler	Buttler; 1st Dueler	Evicted (Week 7)							
Ján	Farmer of the Week					Buttler; 1st Dueler	Evicted (Week 6)								
Janette				2nd Dueler	Buttler; 1st Dueler	Evicted (Week 5)									
Jana			Buttler	Buttler; 1st Dueler	Evicted (Week 4)										
Marcel			2nd Dueler	Evicted (Week 3)											
Daniela		2nd Dueler	Evicted (Week 2)												
Jaroslav	Buttler; 1st Dueler	Evicted (Week 1)													
Ejected	None											Milan	None		
1st Dueler (By Group)	Jaroslav	Lucia	Milan	Jana	Janette	Ján	Zuzana	Dávid	Alena	Milan	Lulu	Lucia	None		
2nd Dueler (By 1st Dueler)	Miroslav	Daniela	Marcel	Janette	Zuzana	Nikolas	Vladimíra	Nikolas	Lulu	Roman	Lucia	Vladimíra	None		
Evicted	Jaroslav; Lost duel	Daniela; Lost duel	Marcel; Lost duel	Jana; Lost duel	Janette; Lost duel	Ján; Lost duel	Zuzana; Lost duel	Nikolas; Lost duel	Alena; Lost duel	Roman; Lost duel	Lulu; Lost duel	Vladimíra; Saved	Vladimíra; Voted out	Lucia; Lost duel	Dávid; Runner-up; Lost final duel
Evicted	Jaroslav; Lost duel	Daniela; Lost duel	Marcel; Lost duel	Jana; Lost duel	Janette; Lost duel	Ján; Lost duel	Zuzana; Lost duel	Nikolas; Lost duel	Alena; Lost duel	Roman; Lost duel	Lulu; Lost duel	Vladimíra; Saved	Vladimíra; Voted out	Lucia; Lost duel	Miroslav; Winner; Wins final duel

== The game ==
Week	Farmer of the Week	Butlers	1st Dueler	2nd Dueler	Evicted	Finish
1	Ján	Vladimíra; Jaroslav	Jaroslav	Miroslav	Jaroslav	1st Evicted
2	Milan	Lucia; Miroslav	Lucia	Daniela	Daniela	2nd Evicted
3	Zuzana	Jana; Milan	Milan	Marcel	Marcel	3rd Evicted
4	Dávid	Jana; Miroslav	Jana	Janette	Jana	4th Evicted
5	Miroslav	Janette; Dávid	Janette	Zuzana	Janette	5th Evicted
6	Lucia	Zuzana; Ján	Ján	Nikolas	Ján	6th Evicted
7	Alena	Zuzana; Nikolas	Zuzana	Vladimíra	Zuzana	7th Evicted
8	Miroslav	Vladimíra; Dávid	Dávid	Nikolas	Nikolas	8th Evicted
9	Roman	Alena; Milan	Alena	Lulu	Alena	9th Evicted
10	Miroslav	Lulu; Milan	Milan	Roman	Roman	10th Evicted
11	Vladimíra	Lulu; Dávid	Lulu	Lucia	Lulu	11th Evicted
12	Dávid	Lucia; Miroslav	Lucia	Vladimíra	Vladimíra	Saved
12	Dávid	Lucia; Miroslav	Lucia	Vladimíra	Milan	Ejected
13	Miroslav	Lucia; Dávid; Vladimíra	Jury's Vote	None	Vladimíra	12th Evicted
13	Miroslav	Lucia; Dávid; Vladimíra	Lucia	Dávid	Lucia	13th Evicted
Final Duel					Dávid	Runner-up
Final Duel					Miroslav	Winner
