= Farma season 7 =

Farma
- Season 7
- Presented by: Kveta Horváthová
- No. of days: 10 weeks
- No. of housemates: 12
- Winner: Tomáš Mrva
- Runner-up: Lucia Mokráňová

Release
- Original network: Markíza
- Original release: February 26 – May 13, 2016

Season chronology
- ← Previous; Season 6 Next → Season 8

Farma 7: All-Stars (English: The Farm 7) is the 7th season of the Slovak version of The Farm reality television show based on the Swedish television series of the same name. The show was filmed from February 2016 to April 2016 and premiered on February 26, 2016, on Markíza. For the first time, former players from past seasons will play again.

== Format ==
Twelve contestants are chosen from the outside world. Each week one contestant is selected as Farmer of the Week. In the first week, the contestants chose the Farmer. Since week 2, the Farmer is chosen by the contestant evicted in the previous week.

=== Nomination process ===
The Farmer of the Week nominates two people (a man and a woman) as the Butlers. The others must decide which Butler is the first to go to the Battle. That person then chooses the second person (from the same sex) for the Battle and also the type of battle (a quiz, extrusion, endurance, sleight). The Battle winner must win two duels. The Battle loser is evicted from the game.

=== Guest appearance ===
During All-Stars season former winners Andrea Járová from Farma 1, Mário Drobný from Farma 3, Pavol Styk from Farma 4, Lenka Švaralová from Farma 5 and Tomáš Mayer from Farma 6 visited the farm.

== Contestants ==
Ages stated are at time of contest.

Contestant	Season	Place	Age	Background	Hometown	Status	Finish
Roman Olach	Farma 2	11th	24	Worker	Partizánske	1st Evicted on Week 1	12th
Alžbeta Janíčková	Farma 5	12th	48	Production operator	Vráble	2nd Evicted on Week 2	11th
Reza Givili	Farma 5	4th	32	Chef	Bratislava	4th Evicted on Week 4	10th
Jana Hrmová	Farma 4	5th	21	Student	Bratislava	Evacuated on Week 6	9th
Ján Juhaščik	Farma 4	7th	54	Electrician	Svidník	6th Evicted on Week 6	8th
Lenka Hrčková	Farma 5	7th	25	Waitress	Banská Bystrica	Evacuated on Week 7	7th
Ľubomír Filkor	Farma 2	14th	49	Teacher	Spišská Nová Ves	8th Evicted on Week 8	6th
Šárka Rácová	Farma 4	11th	43	Unemployed	Uhrovec	9th Evicted on Week 9	5th
Miloš Ferleťák	Farma 1	10th	38	DJ	Námestovo	10th Evicted on Week 10	4th
Miriam Pribanić	Farma 5	9th	54	Housewife	Bratislava	3rd place on Week 10	3rd
Lucia Mokráňová	Farma 5	15th	24	Fitness trainer	Bratislava	Runner-up on Week 10	2nd
Tomáš Mrva	Farma 2	Runner-up	28	Footballer	Trnava	Winner on Week 10	1st

=== Nominations ===
	Week 1	Week 2	Week 3	Week 4	Week 5	Week 6	Week 7	Week 8	Week 9	Week 10		Final
Farmer of the Week (Immunity)	Ján	Ľubomír	Lenka	Ľubomír	Miriam	Miloš	Šárka	Šárka	Lucia	Lucia		None
Buttlers	Ľubomír; Alžbeta	Reza; Lenka	Ján; Šárka	Reza; Miriam	Ľubomír; Jana	Ján; Šárka	Tomáš; Lucia	Miloš; Lucia	Tomáš; Šárka	Tomáš; Miloš; Miriam	Tomáš; Miriam	None
Tomáš				2nd Dueler	2nd Dueler	2nd Dueler	Buttler		Buttler	Buttler	Buttler; 1st Dueler	Winner (Week 10)
Lucia							Buttler; 1st Dueler	Buttler	Farmer of the Week	Farmer of the Week		Runner-Up (Week 10)
Miriam	Not in The Farm			Buttler	Farmer of the Week		2nd Dueler	Evicted (Week 7)	2nd Dueler	Buttler	Buttler; 2nd Dueler	3rd Place (Week 10)
Miloš	Not in The Farm					Farmer of the Week		Buttler; 1st Dueler		Buttler	Evicted (Week 10)	
Šárka			Buttler			Buttler	Farmer of the Week	Farmer of the Week	Buttler; 1st Dueler	Evicted (Week 9)		
Ľubomír	Buttler; 1st Dueler	Farmer of the Week		Farmer of the Week	Buttler; 1st Dueler	Evicted (Week 5)		2nd Dueler	Evicted (Week 8)			
Lenka		Buttler; 1st Dueler	Farmer of the Week					Evacuated (Week 7)				
Ján	Farmer of the Week		Buttler; 1st Dueler	Evicted (Week 3)		Buttler; 1st Dueler	Evicted (Week 6)					
Jana					Buttler		Evacuated (Week 6)					
Reza		Buttler	2nd Dueler	Buttler; 1st Dueler	Evicted (Week 4)							
Alžbeta	Buttler	2nd Dueler	Evicted (Week 2)									
Roman	2nd Dueler	Evicted (Week 1)										
Evacuated	None					Jana	Lenka	None				
1st Dueler (By Group)	Ľubomír	Lenka	Ján	Reza	Ľubomír	Ján	Lucia	Miloš	Šárka	None		
2nd Dueler (By 1st Dueler)	Roman	Alžbeta	Reza	Tomáš	Tomáš	Tomáš	Miriam	Ľubomír	Miriam	None		
Evicted	Roman; Lost duel	Alžbeta; Lost duel	Ján; Lost duel	Reza; Lost duel	Ľubomír; Lost duel	Ľubomír; Returned	Miriam; Lost duel	Miriam; Returned	Šárka; Lost duel	Miloš; Voted out	Miriam; Lost duel	Lucia; Runner-up; Lost final duel
Evicted	Roman; Lost duel	Alžbeta; Lost duel	Ján; Lost duel	Reza; Lost duel	Ján; Returned	Ján; Lost duel	Miriam; Lost duel	Ľubomír; Lost duel	Šárka; Lost duel	Miloš; Voted out	Miriam; Lost duel	Tomáš; Winner; Wins final duel

== The game ==
Week	Farmer of the Week	Butlers	1st Dueler	Vote	2nd Dueler	Evicted	Finish
1	Ján	Ľubomír; Alžbeta	Ľubomír	6-1	Roman	Roman	1st Evicted
2	Ľubomír	Reza; Lenka	Lenka	6-0	Alžbeta	Alžbeta	2nd Evicted
3	Lenka	Ján; Šárka	Ján	3-2	Reza	Ján	3rd Evicted
4	Ľubomír	Reza; Miriam	Reza	5-1	Tomáš	Reza	4th Evicted
5	Miriam	Ľubomír; Jana	Ľubomír	5-1	Tomáš	Ľubomír	5th Evicted
6	Miloš	Ján; Šárka	Ján	4-3	Tomáš	Jana	Evacuated
6	Miloš	Ján; Šárka	Ján	4-3	Tomáš	Ján	6th Evicted
7	Šárka	Tomáš; Lucia	Lucia	4-3	Miriam	Miriam	7th Evicted
7	Šárka	Tomáš; Lucia	Lucia	4-3	Miriam	Lenka	Evacuated
8	Šárka	Miloš; Lucia	Miloš	3-2	Ľubomír	Ľubomír	8th Evicted
9	Lucia	Tomáš; Šárka	Šárka	3-2	Miriam	Šárka	9th Evicted
10	Lucia	Miloš; Tomáš; Miriam	Jury's Vote	4-3-0	None	Miloš	10th Evicted
10	Lucia	Miloš; Tomáš; Miriam	Tomáš	4-3-0	Miriam	Miriam	3rd place
Final Duel						Lucia	Runner-up
Final Duel						Tomáš	Winner
