= Karl Sovanka =

Karl Sovanka (Karol Šovánka) (7 March 1893 in Uhrovec, near Trenčín, Slovakia – 1961 in Östringen, Germany) was a painter and sculptor. He is primarily known for his paintings of animals and hunting motifs.

He was a famous painter and sculptor from the town of Kežmarok. He studied in Budapest (prof. Ľudovít Mátray), in Brussels (prof. van der Stappen), and in Paris. He was a member of the Slovak painters club in Bratislava.

Sovanka was painting countrysides, animals and hunting motifs in nature, and he also made some sculptures and glasses. At an exhibition in Prague in 1931, he was exhibited with the oil paintings "Fox in the winter", "Dogs with boar", and others. Besides Slovakia and Prague, he also held exhibitions in Brno and Budapest.

Other famous paintings: Tatras countryside.
