= Farma season 5 =

Farma
- Season 5
- Presented by: Kveta Horváthová
- No. of days: 15 weeks
- No. of housemates: 18
- Winner: Lenka Š.
- Runner-up: Tibor
- No. of episodes: 79

Release
- Original network: Markíza
- Original release: August 28 – December 18, 2014

Season chronology
- ← Previous; Season 4 Next → Season 6

Farma 5 - Znovuzrodenie (English: The Farm 5 - Rebirth) is the Slovak version of The Farm reality television show based on the Swedish television series of the same name. The show filmed from August 2014 to November 2014 and premiered on August 28, 2014 on Markíza.

== Format ==
Twelve contestants are cut out from outside world. Each week one contestant is selected the Farmer of the Week. In the first week, the contestants choose the Farmer. Since week 2, the Farmer is chosen by the contestant evicted in the previous week.

=== Nomination Process ===
The Farmer of the Week nominates two people (a man and a woman) as the Butlers. The others must decide, which Butler is the first to go to the Battle. That person than choose the second person (from the same sex) for the Battle and also the type of battle (a quiz, extrusion, endurance, sleight). The Battle winner must win two duels. The Battle loser is evicted from the game. In the live final 18 December 2014 Lenka Švaralová won 50 000 € . Tibor Repa finish on the second place. Lenka Švaralová won title Favorit Farmer.

== Contestants ==
Ages stated are at time of contest.

Contestant	Age	Background	Hometown	Status	Finish
Marek Pavlov	23	Psychologist	Hnúšťa	2nd Evicted on Week 2	18th
Ľubomír Snopko	19	Brigadier	Čerín	3rd Evicted on Week 3	17th
Anna Koleňáková	19	Student	Hrušovany	4th Evicted on Week 4	16th
Lucia Mokráňová	22	Fitness trainer	Bratislava	Evacuated on Week 6	15th
Ján Beutel	57	Driver	Poprad	Evacuated on Week 6	14th
Patrik Mirga	22	Student	Trnava	6th Evicted on Week 6	13th
Alžbeta Janíčková	46	Worker	Vráble	7th Evicted on Week 7	12th
Viktor Matz	21	Hairstylist	Košice	8th Evicted on Week 8	11th
Iris Janošová	24	Waitress	Bratislava	9th Evicted on Week 9	10th
Miriam Pribanić	53	Assistant	Bratislava	11th Evicted on Week 11	9th
Ľuboš Jankech	37	Gravedigger	Malženice	12th Evicted on Week 12	8th
Lenka Hrčková	23	Unemployed	Banská Bystrica	13th Evicted on Week 13	7th
Eva Kapusniaková	25	Police Officer	Tatranská Lomnica	14th Evicted on Week 13	6th
Jana Ivaničová	33	Unemployed	Buzitka	15th Evicted on Week 14	5th
Reza Givili	31	Chef	Senica	16th Evicted on Week 15	4th
Matúš Lengvarský	25	Builder	Spišská Nová Ves	3rd place on Week 15	3rd
Tibor Repa	46	Mechanic	Pusté Úľany	Runner-up on Week 15	2nd
Lenka Švaralová	27	Waitress	Levice	Winner on Week 15	1st

=== Future appearances ===
Alžbeta Janíčková, Reza Givili, Lenka Hrčková, Lucia Mokráňová and Miriam Pribanić returned to Farma for Farma: All-Stars, respectively placing 11th and 10th, Hrčková was evacuated after 49 days and placing 7th. Pribanić made it to the Final 3 where she lost duel and placing 3rd while Mokráňová reach the final and finished 2nd. Pribanić also competed on the Croatian Farma 4 before All Stars where she finished 6th out of 18.

=== Nominations ===
	Week 1	Week 2	Week 3	Week 4	Week 5	Week 6	Week 7	Week 8	Week 9	Week 10	Week 11	Week 12	Week 13	Week 14	Week 15		Final
Farmer of the Week (Immunity)	Ján	Lucia; Ľubomír	Jana	Patrik	Patrik	Tibor	Lenka H.	Tibor	Ľuboš	Matúš	Eva	Reza	Lenka Š.	Tibor	Tibor		None
Buttlers	Marek; Alžbeta	Tibor; Lenka H.	Ľubomír; Anna	Ján; Miriam	Viktor; Miriam	Patrik; Jana	Viktor; Miriam	Reza; Eva	Matúš; Miriam	Ľuboš; Lenka H.	Matúš; Jana	Ľuboš; Eva	Reza; Lenka H.	Matúš; Lenka Š.	Matúš; Reza; Lenka Š.	Matúš; Lenka Š.	None
Lenka Š.	Not in The Farm									2nd Dueler			Farmer of the Week	Buttler; 1st Dueler	Buttler	Buttler; 1st Dueler	Winner (Week 15)
Tibor		Buttler; 1st Dueler			2nd Dueler	Farmer of the Week		Farmer of the Week				Evacuated (Week 11)		Farmer of the Week	Farmer of the Week		Runner-Up (Week 15)
Matúš	Not in The Farm								Buttler	Farmer of the Week	Buttler	2nd Dueler		Buttler	Buttler	Buttler; 2nd Dueler	3rd Place (Week 15)
Reza	Not in The Farm							Buttler; 1st Dueler				Farmer of the Week	Buttler		Buttler	Evicted (Week 15)	
Jana			Farmer of the Week			Buttler; 1st Dueler					Buttler; 1st Dueler		2nd Dueler	2nd Dueler	Evicted (Week 14)		
Eva	Not in The Farm							Buttler			Farmer of the Week	Buttler		Evicted (Week 13)			
Lenka H.		Buttler				2nd Dueler	Farmer of the Week			Buttler; 1st Dueler	Evicted (Week 10)		Buttler; 1st Dueler	Evicted (Week 13)			
Ľuboš	Not in The Farm								Farmer of the Week	Buttler		Buttler; 1st Dueler	Evicted (Week 12)				
Miriam				Buttler; 1st Dueler	Buttler		Buttler; 1st Dueler		Buttler; 1st Dueler		2nd Dueler	Evicted (Week 11)					
Iris	Not in The Farm								2nd Dueler	Evicted (Week 9)							
Viktor			2nd Dueler		Buttler; 1st Dueler	Evicted (Week 5)	Buttler	2nd Dueler	Evicted (Week 8)								
Alžbeta	Buttler; 1st Dueler						2nd Dueler	Evicted (Week 7)									
Patrik				Farmer of the Week	Farmer of the Week	Buttler	Evicted (Week 6)										
Ján	Farmer of the Week			Buttler			Evacuated (Week 6)										
Lucia		Farmer of the Week	Evacuated (Day 9)				Evacuated (Week 6)										
Anna	2nd Dueler	Evicted (Week 1)	Buttler	2nd Dueler	Evicted (Week 4)												
Ľubomír		Farmer of the Week	Buttler; 1st Dueler	Evicted (Week 3)													
Marek	Buttler	2nd Dueler	Evicted (Week 2)														
Evacuated	None	Lucia	None			Lucia, Ján	None					Tibor	None				
1st Dueler (By Group)	Alžbeta	Tibor	Ľubomír	Miriam	Viktor	Jana	Miriam	Reza	Miriam	Lenka H.	Jana	Ľuboš	Lenka H.	Lenka Š.	None		
2nd Dueler (By 1st Dueler)	Anna	Marek	Viktor	Anna	Tibor	Lenka H.	Alžbeta	Viktor	Iris	Lenka Š.	Miriam	Matúš	Jana	Jana	None		
Evicted	Anna; Lost duel	Marek; Lost duel	Ľubomír; Lost duel	Anna; Lost duel	Viktor; Lost duel	Patrik; Evicted	Alžbeta; Lost duel	Viktor; Lost duel	Iris; Lost duel	Lenka H. Lost duel	Miriam; Lost duel	Ľuboš; Lost duel	Lenka H. Lost duel	Jana; Lost duel	Reza; Voted out	Matúš; Lost duel	Tibor; Runner-up; Lost final duel
Evicted	Anna; Lost duel	Anna; Returned	Ľubomír; Lost duel	Anna; Lost duel	Viktor; Lost duel	Viktor; Returned	Alžbeta; Lost duel	Viktor; Lost duel	Iris; Lost duel	Lenka H. Lost duel	Lenka H. Returned	Ľuboš; Lost duel	Eva; Evicted	Jana; Lost duel	Reza; Voted out	Matúš; Lost duel	Lenka Š. Winner; Wins final duel

== The game ==
Week	Farmer of the Week	Buttlers	1st Dueler	Vote	2nd Dueler	Evicted	Finish
1	Ján	Marek; Alžbeta	Alžbeta	6-3	Anna	Anna	1st Evicted; Day 7
2	~~Lucia~~; Ľubomír	Tibor; Lenka H.	Tibor	5-4	Marek	Lucia	Evacuated
2	~~Lucia~~; Ľubomír	Tibor; Lenka H.	Tibor	5-4	Marek	Anna	Return
2	~~Lucia~~; Ľubomír	Tibor; Lenka H.	Tibor	5-4	Marek	Marek	2nd Evicted
3	Jana	Ľubomír; Anna	Ľubomír	6-1	Viktor	Ľubomír	3rd Evicted
4	Patrik	Ján; Miriam	Miriam	4-2	Anna	Anna	4th Evicted
5	Patrik	Viktor; Miriam	Viktor	4-1	Tibor	Lucia	Return
5	Patrik	Viktor; Miriam	Viktor	4-1	Tibor	Viktor	5th Evicted
6	Tibor	Patrik; Jana	Jana	4-2	Lenka H.	Lucia	Evacuated
6	Tibor	Patrik; Jana	Jana	4-2	Lenka H.	Ján	Evacuated
6	Tibor	Patrik; Jana	Jana	4-2	Lenka H.	Viktor	Return
6	Tibor	Patrik; Jana	Jana	4-2	Lenka H.	Patrik	6th Evicted
7	Lenka H.	Viktor; Miriam	Miriam	4-1	Alžbeta	Alžbeta	7th Evicted
8	Tibor	Reza; Eva	Reza	3-1	Viktor	Viktor	8th Evicted
9	Ľuboš	Matúš; Miriam	Miriam	6-1	Iris	Iris	9th Evicted
10	Matúš	Ľuboš; Lenka H.	Lenka H.	4-2	Lenka Š.	Lenka H.	10th Evicted
11	Eva	Matúš; Jana	Jana	5-0	Miriam	Tibor	Evacuated
11	Eva	Matúš; Jana	Jana	5-0	Miriam	Lenka H.	Return
11	Eva	Matúš; Jana	Jana	5-0	Miriam	Miriam	11th Evicted
12	Reza	Ľuboš; Eva	Ľuboš	3-2	Matúš	Ľuboš	12th Evicted
12	Reza	Ľuboš; Eva	Ľuboš	3-2	Matúš	Tibor	Return
13	Lenka Š.	Reza; Lenka H.	Lenka H.	3-2	Jana	Lenka H.	13th Evicted
13	Lenka Š.	Reza; Lenka H.	Lenka H.	3-2	Jana	Eva	14th Evicted
14	Tibor	Matúš; Lenka Š.	Lenka Š.	2-1	Jana	Jana	15th Evicted
15	Tibor	Matúš; Reza; Lenka Š.	Jury's Vote	6-5	None	Reza	16th Evicted
15	Tibor	Matúš; Reza; Lenka Š.	Lenka Š.	6-5	Matúš	Matúš	17th Evicted
Final Duel						Tibor	Runner-up
Final Duel						Lenka Š.	Winner
