= Farma season 6 =

Farma
- Season 6
- Presented by: Kveta Horváthová
- No. of days: 15 weeks
- No. of housemates: 19
- Winner: Tomáš
- Runner-up: Jozef

Release
- Original network: Markíza
- Original release: August 27 – December 18, 2015

Season chronology
- ← Previous; Farma 5 Next → Farma 7

Farma 6 (The Farm 6) is the 6th season of the Slovak version of The Farm reality television show based on the Swedish television series of the same name. The show was filmed from August 2015 to November 2015 and premiered on August 27, 2015 on Markíza.

== Format ==
Twelve contestants are chosen from the outside world. Each week one contestant is selected the Farmer of the Week. In the first week, the contestants choose the Farmer. Since week 2, the Farmer is chosen by the contestant evicted in the previous week.

=== Nomination process ===
The Farmer of the Week nominates two people (a man and a woman) as the Butlers. The others must decide which Butler is the first to go to the Battle. That person then chooses the second person (from the same sex) for the Battle and also the type of battle (a quiz, extrusion, endurance, sleight). The Battle winner must win two duels. The Battle loser is evicted from the game. In the live final 18 December 2015 Tomáš Mayer won €50,000. Jozef Kababík finished second.

== Contestants ==
Ages stated are at time of contest.

Contestant	Age	Background	Hometown	Status	Finish
Ľubomír Struňák	28	Chef	Michalovce	1st Evicted on Week 1	19th
Ladislav Švihla	41	Worker	Štítnik	2nd Evicted on Week 2	18th
Laura Foltínová	20	Bartender	Záhorská Bystrica	3rd Evicted on Week 3	17th
Roman Máče	44	Builder	Nitra	4th Evicted on Week 4	16th
Nikol Máčeová	26	Worker in Netherlands	Klasov	5th Evicted on Week 5	15th
Lívia Koristová	21	Law student	Žilina	6th Evicted on Week 6	14th
Nikola Ledecká	18	Hairdresser	Podbrezová	7th Evicted on Week 7	13th
Ladislav Paško	20	Salesman	Veľký Krtíš	8th Evicted on Week 8	12th
Peter Kovalič	39	Goat farmer	Smolnícka Huta	10th Evicted on Week 10	11th
Daniela Nikoleta Kortišová	20	Photo model	Považská Bystrica	11th Evicted on Week 10	10th
Stanislav Tovcimak	39	Worker	Humenné	12th Evicted on Week 11	9th
Michal Pavlík	18	Student	Nitra	Evacuated on Week 13	8th
Miriama Čaládyová	25	Single mom	Nitra	15th Evicted on Week 14	7th
Katarína Cíbiková	21	Go-go dancer	Horovce	16th Evicted on Week 14	6th
Jana Perunková	39	Crane operator	Poprad	17th Evicted on Week 15	5th
Petra Bejdová	30	Florist	Humenné	18th Evicted on Week 15	4th
Gabriela Molnárová	44	Housewife	Trnava	3rd place on Week 15	3rd
Jozef Kababík	21	Ostler	Košice	Runner-up on Week 15	2nd
Tomáš Mayer	31	Music club owner	Bratislava	Winner on Week 15	1st

=== Nominations ===
	Week 1	Week 2	Week 3	Week 4	Week 5	Week 6	Week 7	Week 8	Week 9	Week 10	Week 11	Week 12	Week 13	Week 14	Week 15			Final
Farmer of the Week (Immunity)	Jana	Petra	Nikola	Petra	Petra	Tomáš	Jana	Michal	Gabriela	Katarína	Michal	Petra	Tomáš	Gabriela	Tomáš; Jozef; Petra	Jozef		None
Buttlers	Ľubomír; Lívia	Ladislav Š. Gabriela	Jozef; Lívia	Jozef; Lívia	Ladislav P. Jana	Jozef; Petra	Michal; Nikola	Ladislav P. Jana	Stanislav; Daniela	Jozef; Gabriela	Stanislav; Petra	Michal; Gabriela	Michal; Petra	Tomáš; Katarína	Jana; Gabriela	Tomáš; Gabriela; Petra	Tomáš; Gabriela	None
Tomáš	Not in The Farm					Farmer of the Week					2nd Dueler		Farmer of the Week	Buttler	Farmer of the Week	Buttler	Buttler; 1st Dueler	Winner (Week 15)
Jozef		2nd Dueler	Buttler	Buttler; 1st Dueler		Buttler		2nd Dueler		Buttler	Evacuated (Week 10)				Farmer of the Week	Farmer of the Week		Runner-Up (Week 15)
Gabriela		Buttler					2nd Dueler		Farmer of the Week	Buttler; 1st Dueler		Buttler; 1st Dueler		Farmer of the Week	Buttler; 2nd Dueler	Buttler	Buttler; 2nd Dueler	3rd Place (Week 15)
Petra		Farmer of the Week		Farmer of the Week	Farmer of the Week	Buttler; 1st Dueler					Buttler	Farmer of the Week	Buttler; 1st Dueler		Farmer of the Week	Buttler	Evicted (Week 15)	
Jana	Farmer of the Week				Buttler; 1st Dueler		Farmer of the Week	Buttler						2nd Dueler	Buttler; 1st Dueler	Evicted (Week 15)		
Katarína	Not in The Farm									Farmer of the Week		2nd Dueler	2nd Dueler	Buttler; 1st Dueler	Evicted (Week 14)			
Miriama	Not in The Farm														Evicted (Week 14)			
Michal							Buttler	Farmer of the Week			Farmer of the Week	Buttler	Buttler	Evacuated (Week 13)				
Stanislav	Not in The Farm								Buttler; 1st Dueler		Buttler; 1st Dueler	Evicted (Week 11)						
Daniela	Not in The Farm								Buttler	2nd Dueler	Evicted (Week 10)							
Peter	Not in The Farm								2nd Dueler		Evicted (Week 10)							
Ladislav P.	2nd Dueler				Buttler			Buttler; 1st Dueler	Evicted (Week 8)									
Nikola			Farmer of the Week				Buttler; 1st Dueler	Evicted (Week 7)										
Lívia	Buttler		Buttler; 1st Dueler	Buttler		2nd Dueler	Evicted (Week 6)											
Nikol	Not in The Farm				2nd Dueler	Evicted (Week 5)												
Roman				2nd Dueler	Evicted (Week 4)													
Laura			2nd Dueler	Evicted (Week 3)														
Ladislav Š.		Buttler; 1st Dueler	Evicted (Week 2)															
Ľubomír	Buttler; 1st Dueler	Evicted (Week 1)																
Evacuated	None									Jozef	None		Michal	None				
1st Dueler (By Group)	Ľubomír	Ladislav Š.	Lívia	Jozef	Jana	Petra	Nikola	Ladislav P.	Stanislav	Gabriela	Stanislav	Gabriela	Petra	Katarína	Jana	None		
2nd Dueler (By 1st Dueler)	Ladislav P.	Jozef	Laura	Roman	Nikol	Lívia	Gabriela	Jozef	Peter	Daniela	Tomáš	Katarína	Katarína	Jana	Gabriela	None		
Evicted	Ľubomír; Lost duel	Ladislav Š. Lost duel	Laura; Lost duel	Roman; Lost duel	Nikol; Lost duel	Lívia; Lost duel	Nikola; Lost duel	Ladislav P. Lost duel	Stanislav; Lost duel	Peter; Evicted	Stanislav; Lost duel	Katarína; Lost duel	Katarína; Returned	Miriama; Voted out	Jana; Lost duel	Petra; Voted out	Gabriela; Lost duel	Jozef; Runner-up; Lost final duel
Evicted	Ľubomír; Lost duel	Ladislav Š. Lost duel	Laura; Lost duel	Roman; Lost duel	Nikol; Lost duel	Lívia; Lost duel	Nikola; Lost duel	Ladislav P. Lost duel	Stanislav; Lost duel	Stanislav; Returned	Stanislav; Lost duel	Katarína; Lost duel	Jozef; Returned	Petra; Returned	Jana; Lost duel	Petra; Voted out	Gabriela; Lost duel	Jozef; Runner-up; Lost final duel
Evicted	Ľubomír; Lost duel	Ladislav Š. Lost duel	Laura; Lost duel	Roman; Lost duel	Nikol; Lost duel	Lívia; Lost duel	Nikola; Lost duel	Ladislav P. Lost duel	Stanislav; Lost duel	Daniela; Lost duel	Stanislav; Lost duel	Katarína; Lost duel	Petra; Lost duel	Katarína; Lost duel	Jana; Lost duel	Petra; Voted out	Gabriela; Lost duel	Tomáš; Winner; Wins final duel

== The game ==
Week	Farmer of the Week	Butlers	1st Dueler	Vote	2nd Dueler	Evicted	Finish
1	Jana	Ľubomír; Lívia	Ľubomír	8-1	Ladislav P.	Ľubomír	1st Evicted
2	Petra	Ladislav Š. Gabriela	Ladislav Š.	5-3	Jozef	Ladislav Š.	2nd Evicted
3	Nikola	Jozef; Lívia	Lívia	6-1	Laura	Laura	3rd Evicted
4	Petra	Jozef; Lívia	Jozef	3-2	Roman	Roman	4th Evicted
5	Petra	Ladislav P. Jana	Jana	4-3	Nikol	Nikol	5th Evicted
6	Tomáš	Jozef; Petra	Petra	4-2	Lívia	Lívia	6th Evicted
7	Jana	Michal; Nikola	Nikola	3-2	Gabriela	Nikola	7th Evicted
8	Michal	Ladislav P. Jana	Ladislav P.	3-1	Jozef	Ladislav P.	8th Evicted
9	Gabriela	Stanislav; Daniela	Stanislav	5-4	Peter	Stanislav	9th Evicted
10	Katarína	Jozef; Gabriela	Gabriela	5-2	Daniela	Daniela	11th Evicted
11	Michal	Stanislav; Petra	Stanislav	3-2	Tomáš	Stanislav	12th Evicted
12	Petra	Michal; Gabriela	Gabriela	4-0	Katarína	Katarína	13th Evicted
13	Tomáš	Michal; Petra	Petra	4-0	Katarína	Petra	14th Evicted
14	Gabriela	Tomáš; Katarína	Katarína	3-0	Jana	Miriama	15th Evicted
14	Gabriela	Tomáš; Katarína	Katarína	3-0	Jana	Katarína	16th Evicted
15	Tomáš; Jozef; Petra	Jana; Gabriela	Jana	5-2-2-1	Gabriela	Jana	16th Evicted
15	Jozef	Tomáš; Gabriela; Petra	Jury's Vote	10-1-0	None	Petra	17th Evicted
15	Jozef	Tomáš; Gabriela	Tomáš	10-1-0	Gabriela	Gabriela	18th Evicted
Final Duel						Jozef	Runner-up
Final Duel						Tomáš	Winner
