= Farma season 1 =

Farma
- Season 1
- Presented by: Kveta Horváthová
- No. of days: 42
- No. of housemates: 10
- Winner: Andrea Járová
- Runner-up: Lenka Liptáková
- Location: Horné Paseky, Slovakia
- No. of episodes: 33

Release
- Original network: Markíza
- Original release: 23 July – 9 September 2011

Season chronology
- Next → Season 2

Farma 1 — Bude to drsné (English: The Farm 1) is the Slovak version of The Farm reality television show based on the Swedish television series of the same name. The show filmed in May–June 2011 and premiered on July 23, 2011 on Markíza. The winner was Andrea Járová.

== Format ==
Ten contestants are cut out from outside world. Each week one contestant is selected the Farmer of the Week. In the first week, the contestants choose the Farmer. Since week 2, the Farmer is chosen by the contestant evicted in the previous week.

=== Nomination Process ===
The Farmer of the Week nominates two people (a man and a woman) as the Butlers. The others must decide, which Butler is the first to go to the Battle. That person than choose the second person (from the same sex) for the Battle and also the type of battle (a quiz, tug-of-war, cutting wood). The Battle winner must win one duel. The Battle loser is evicted from the game. In the live final 9 September 2011 Andrea Járová won 50 000 € . Lenka Liptáková finish on the second place. Michal Kováčik won title Favorit Farmer.

=== Contestants ===
| Contestant | Age | Background | Hometown | Status | Finish |
|---|---|---|---|---|---|
| Miloš Ferleťák | 33 | DJ | Námestovo | 1st Evicted; Day 7 | 10th |
| Martin Kucek | 57 | Technician | Bratislava | 2nd Evicted; Day 14 | 9th |
| Lenka Cabanová | 36 | Student | London | 3rd Evicted; Day 21 | 8th |
| Richard Požgay | 33 | Unemployed | Bratislava | 4th Evicted; Day 21 | 7th |
| Jakub Kušnirák | 20 | Student | Poprad | 5th Evicted; Day 28 | 6th |
| Štefan Tóth | 28 | Dancer | Stupava | 6th Evicted; Day 35 | 5th |
| Michal Kováčik | 23 | Cabinetmarker | Lehota pod Vtáčnikom | 7th Evicted; Day 41 | 4th |
| Monika Hrajnohová | 22 | Unemployed | Dunajská Streda | 3rd place Day 41 | 3rd |
| Lenka Liptáková | 30 | Maternity leave | Vlková | Runner-up; Day 42 | 2nd |
| Andrea Járová | 27 | Model | Bratislava | Winner; Day 42 | 1st |

=== Future appearances ===
Miloš Ferleťák returned to Farma for Farma: All-Stars and placing 4th.

=== Nominations ===
| | Week 1 | Week 2 | Week 3 | Week 4 | Week 5 | Week 6 | | Final |
|---|---|---|---|---|---|---|---|---|
| Farmer of the Week (Immunity) | Martin | Andrea | Jakub | Michal | Andrea | Lenka L. | | None |
| Buttlers | Monika; Miloš | Lenka L. Martin | Lenka C. Michal | Andrea; Jakub | Monika; Michal | Monika; Michal; Andrea | Monika; Andrea | None |
| Andrea | | Farmer of the Week | | Buttler | Farmer of the Week | Buttler | Buttler; 1st Dueler | Winner; Day 42 |
| Lenka L. | | Buttler | | | | Farmer of the Week | | Runner-Up; Day 42 |
| Monika | Buttler | | 2nd Dueler | | Buttler | Buttler | Buttler; 2nd Dueler | 3rd Place; Day 41 |
| Michal | | | Buttler | Farmer of the Week | Buttler; 1st Dueler | Buttler | Evicted; Day 41 | |
| Štefan | | 2nd Dueler | | 2nd Dueler | 2nd Dueler | Evicted; Day 35 | | |
| Jakub | | | Farmer of the Week | Buttler; 1st Dueler | Evicted; Day 28 | | | |
| Richard | 2nd Dueler | | | Evicted; Day 21 | | | | |
| Lenka C. | | | Buttler; 1st Dueler | Evicted; Day 21 | | | | |
| Martin | Farmer of the Week | Buttler; 1st Dueler | Evicted; Day 14 | | | | | |
| Miloš | Buttler; 1st Dueler | Evicted; Day 7 | | | | | | |
| 1st Dueler (By Group) | Miloš | Martin | Lenka C. | Jakub | Michal | None | | |
| 2nd Dueler (By 1st Dueler) | Richard | Štefan | Monika | Štefan | Štefan | None | | |
| Evicted | Miloš; Lost Duel; Day 7 | Martin; Lost Duel; Day 14 | Lenka C. Lost Duel; Day 21 | Jakub; Lost Duel; Day 28 | Štefan; Lost Duel; Day 35 | Michal; Voted Out; Day 41 | Monika; Lost Duel; Day 41 | Lenka L. Runner-up; Lost Final Duel; Day 42 |
| Evicted | Miloš; Lost Duel; Day 7 | Martin; Lost Duel; Day 14 | Richard; Voted Out; Day 21 | Jakub; Lost Duel; Day 28 | Štefan; Lost Duel; Day 35 | Michal; Voted Out; Day 41 | Monika; Lost Duel; Day 41 | Andrea; Winner; Wins Final Duel; Day 42 |

== The game ==
| Week | Farmer of the Week | Buttlers | 1st Dueler | Vote | 2nd Dueler | Evicted | Finish |
|---|---|---|---|---|---|---|---|
| 1 | Martin | Monika; Miloš | Miloš | 4-3 | Richard | Miloš | 1st Evicted; Day 7 |
| 2 | Andrea | Lenka L. Martin | Martin | 7-0 | Štefan | Martin | 2nd Evicted; Day 14 |
| 3 | Jakub | Lenka C. Michal | Lenka C. | 6-0 | Monika | Lenka C. | 3rd Evicted; Day 21 |
| 3 | Jakub | Lenka C. Michal | Lenka C. | 6-0 | Monika | Richard | 4th Evicted; Day 21 |
| 4 | Michal | Andrea; Jakub | Jakub | 2-1 | Štefan | Jakub | 5th Evicted; Day 28 |
| 5 | Andrea | Monika; Michal | Michal | 2-1 | Štefan | Štefan | 6th Evicted; Day 35 |
| 6 | Lenka L. | Monika; Michal; Andrea | Jury Vote | 3-2-1 | None | Michal | 7th Evicted; Day 41 |
| 6 | Lenka L. | Monika; Andrea | Monika | 3-2-1 | Andrea | Monika | 8th Evicted; Day 41 |
| Final Duel | | | | | | Lenka L. | Runner-up; Day 42 |
| Final Duel | | | | | | Andrea | Winner; Day 42 |
