= Farma season 3 =

Farma
- Season 3
- Presented by: Kveta Horváthová
- No. of days: 98
- No. of housemates: 18
- Winner: Mário Drobný
- Runner-up: Silvia Haluzová
- No. of episodes: 75

Release
- Original network: Markíza
- Original release: 7 September – 16 December 2012

Season chronology
- ← Previous; Season 2 Next → Season 4

Farma 3 – Bude to divočina (English: The Farm 3) is the Slovak version of The Farm reality television show based on the Swedish television series of the same name. The show filmed in August–November 2012 and premiered on 7 September 2012 on Markíza.

== Format ==
Eighteen contestants are cut out from outside world. Each week one contestant is selected the Farmer of the Week. In the first week, the contestants choose the Farmer. Since week 2, the Farmer is chosen by the contestant evicted in the previous week.

=== Nomination Process ===
The Farmer of the Week nominates two people (a man and a woman) as the Butlers. The others must decide, which Butler is the first to go to the Battle. That person than choose the second person (from the same sex) for the Battle and also the type of battle (a quiz, extrusion, endurance, sleight). The Battle winner must win two duels. The Battle loser is evicted from the game. In the live final 16 December 2012 Mário Drobný won €50 000 . Silvia Haluzová finish on the second place. Mário Drobný won title Favorite Farmer.

=== Contestants ===
Ages stated are at time of contest.

Contestant	Age	Background	Hometown	Status	Finish
Nikola Čajkovská	19	Unemployed	Bratislava	Quit; Day 7	18th
Lýdia Spišáková	18	Student	Sabinov	Quit; Day 9	17th
Gabriel Sajka †	54	Businessman	Levice	Removed due to Injury; Day 9	16th
Ján Strausz	27	Unemployed	Košice	Ejected; Day 21	15th
Martina Štetiarová	29	Model	Čadca	2nd Evicted; Day 21	14th
Renáta Kovárová	42	Head of post	Dunajská Lužná	3rd Evicted; Day 28	13th
Vladimír Kovár	46	Tradesman	Dunajská Lužná	4th Evicted; Day 28	12th
Lucia Nemčeková	26	Unemployed	Bratislava	5th Evicted; Day 35	11th
Štefan Vaško	34	Painter	Stropkov	6th Evicted; Day 49	10th
Veronika Bohumelová	19	Unemployed	Bratislava	7th Evicted; Day 56	9th
Peter Vaculčík	20	Businessman	Bratislava	8th Evicted; Day 70	8th
Jana Kallayová	27	Manageress	Bratislava	9th Evicted; Day 77	7th
Tomáš Šimrák	23	Tradesman	Bratislava	10th Evicted; Day 84	6th
Edita Orosová	23	Maternity leave	Lužianky	11th Evicted; Day 91	5th
Andrea Vaničková	40	Teacher	Stupava	12th Evicted oDay 96	4th
Andrej Grelnet	39	Businessman	Banská Bystrica	3rd place Day 97	3rd
Silvia Haluzová	54	Unemployed	Trnava	Runner-up; Day 98	2nd
Mário Drobný	21	Unemployed	Zavar	Winner; Day 98	1st

=== Nominations ===
	Week 1	Week 2	Week 3	Week 4	Week 5	Week 6	Week 7	Week 8	Week 9	Week 10	Week 11	Week 12	Week 13	Week 14		Final
Farmer of the Week (Immunity)	Ján	Lýdia; Vladimír	Silvia	Lucia	Silvia	Mário	Andrej	Peter	Tomáš	Tomáš	Silvia	Andrej	Andrej	Silvia		None
Buttlers	Jana; Štefan	Andrea; Ján	Jana; Peter	Renáta; Vladimír	Lucia; Mário	Silvia; Peter	Andrea; Peter	Veronika; Tomáš	Jana; Peter	Jana; Peter	Andrej; Mário; Andrea	Andrea; Tomáš	Silvia; Mário	Andrea; Mário	Andrej; Mário	None
Mário	Not in The Farm			2nd Dueler	Buttler	Farmer of the Week				2nd Dueler	Buttler	2nd Dueler	Buttler	Buttler	Buttler; 1st Dueler	Winner (Week 14)
Silvia			Farmer of the Week		Farmer of the Week	Buttler					Farmer of the Week		Buttler; 1st Dueler	Farmer of the Week		Runner-Up (Week 14)
Andrej	Not in The Farm						Farmer of the Week				Buttler	Farmer of the Week	Farmer of the Week		Buttler; 2nd Dueler	3rd Place (Week 14)
Andrea	2nd Dueler	Buttler; 1st Dueler	Evicted (Week 2)				Buttler				Buttler; 1st Dueler	Buttler		Buttler	Evicted (Week 14)	
Edita	Not in The Farm												2nd Dueler	Evicted (Week 13)		
Tomáš	Not in The Farm							Buttler	Farmer of the Week	Farmer of the Week		Buttler; 1st Dueler	Evicted (Week 12)			
Jana	Buttler; 1st Dueler		Buttler; 1st Dueler		2nd Dueler			2nd Dueler	Buttler; 2nd Dueler	Buttler	2nd Dueler	Evicted (Week 11)				
Peter			Buttler			Buttler; 1st Dueler	Buttler; 1st Dueler	Farmer of the Week	Buttler; 1st Dueler	Buttler; 1st Dueler	Evicted (Week 10)					
Veronika	Not in The Farm							Buttler; 1st Dueler	Evicted (Week 8)							
Štefan	Buttler					2nd Dueler	2nd Dueler	Evicted (Week 7)								
Lucia	Not in The Farm			Farmer of the Week	Buttler; 1st Dueler	Evicted (Week 5)										
Vladimír		Farmer of the Week		Buttler; 1st Dueler	Evicted (Week 4)											
Renáta		2nd Dueler		Buttler	Evicted (Week 4)											
Martina	Not in The Farm		2nd Dueler	Evicted (Week 3)												
Ján	Farmer of the Week	Buttler		Ejected (Week 3)												
Gabriel			Evacuated (Week 2)													
Lýdia		Farmer of the Week	Quit (Week 2)													
Nikola		Quit (Week 1)														
Evacuated	None	Gabriel	None													
Quit	Nikola	Lýdia	None													
Ejected	None		Ján	None												
1st Dueler (By Group)	Jana	Andrea	Jana	Vladimír	Lucia	Peter	Peter	Veronika	Peter	Peter	Andrea	Tomáš	Silvia	None		
2nd Dueler (By 1st Dueler)	Andrea	Renáta	Martina	Mário	Jana	Štefan	Štefan	Jana	Jana	Mário	Jana	Mário	Edita	None		
Evicted	Duel cancelled	Andrea; Lost duel	Martina; Lost duel	Renáta; Evicted	Lucia; Lost duel	Duel cancelled	Štefan; Lost duel	Veronika; Lost duel	Peter; Saved	Peter; Lost duel	Jana; Lost duel	Tomáš; Lost duel	Edita; Lost duel	Andrea; Voted out	Andrej; Lost duel	Silvia; Runner-up; Lost final duel
Evicted	Duel cancelled	Andrea; Lost duel	Andrea; Returned	Vladimír; Lost duel	Lucia; Lost duel	Duel cancelled	Štefan; Lost duel	Veronika; Lost duel	Peter; Saved	Peter; Lost duel	Jana; Lost duel	Tomáš; Lost duel	Edita; Lost duel	Andrea; Voted out	Andrej; Lost duel	Mário; Winner; Wins final duel

== The game ==
Week	Farmer of the Week	Buttlers	1st Dueler	Vote	2nd Dueler	Evicted	Finish
1	Ján	Jana; Štefan	Jana	8–0	Andrea	Nikola	Quit; Day 7
2	Lýdia	Andrea; Ján	Andrea	3–2	Renáta	Lýdia	Quit
2	Vladimír	Andrea; Ján	Andrea	3–2	Renáta	Gabriel	Evacuated
2	Vladimír	Andrea; Ján	Andrea	3–2	Renáta	Andrea	1st Evicted
3	Silvia	Jana; Peter	Jana	4–3	Martina	Ján	Evicted
3	Silvia	Jana; Peter	Jana	4–3	Martina	Martina	2nd Evicted
3	Silvia	Jana; Peter	Jana	4–3	Martina	Andrea	Return
4	Lucia	Renáta; Vladimír	Vladimír	4–3	Mário	Renáta	3rd Evicted
4	Lucia	Renáta; Vladimír	Vladimír	4–3	Mário	Vladimír	4th Evicted
5	Silvia	Lucia; Mário	Lucia	3–1	Jana	Lucia	5th Evicted
6	Mário	Silvia; Peter	Peter	3–0	Štefan	None	Duel cancelled
7	Andrej	Andrea; Peter	Peter	4–3	Štefan	Štefan	6th Evicted
8	Peter	Veronika; Tomáš	Veronika	5–0	Jana	Andrej	Evacuated
8	Peter	Veronika; Tomáš	Veronika	5–0	Jana	Veronika	7th Evicted
9	Tomáš	Jana; Peter	Peter	3–2	Jana	Andrej	Return
9	Tomáš	Jana; Peter	Peter	3–2	Jana	Peter	Saved
10	Tomáš	Jana; Peter	Peter	4–1	Mário	Peter	8th Evicted
11	Silvia	Andrej; Mário; Andrea	Andrea	None	Jana	Jana	9th Evicted
12	Andrej	Andrea; Tomáš	Tomáš	2–1	Mário	Tomáš	10th Evicted
13	Andrej	Silvia; Mário	Silvia	2–0	Edita	Edita	11th Evicted
14	Silvia	Mário; Andrea	Jury's Vote	8–1	None	Andrea	12th Evicted
14	Silvia	Mário; Andrej	Mário	8–1	Andrej	Andrej	13th Evicted
Final Duel						Silvia	Runner-up
Final Duel						Mário	Winner
