= Dunajská Lužná =

Dunajská Lužná Dénesdtorcsmisérd
- Municipality
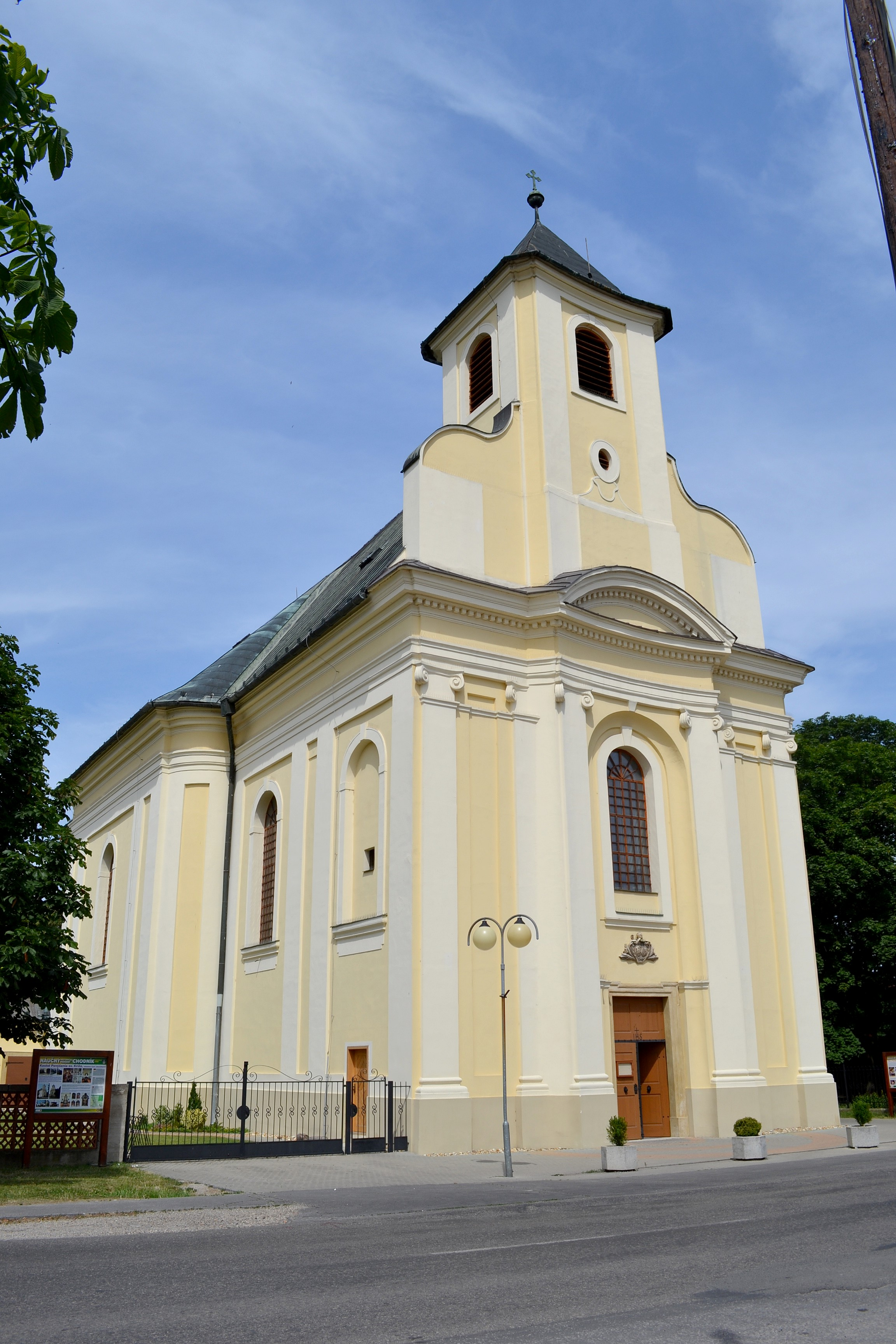
- Church of Exaltation of Holy Cross

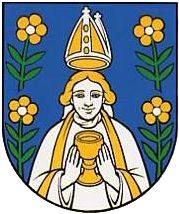
- Flag Coat of arms

- Location of Dunajská Lužná in the Bratislava Region Location of Dunajská Lužná in Slovakia
- Coordinates: 48.08°N 17.27°E
- Country: Slovakia
- Region: Bratislava Region
- District: Senec District
- First mentioned: 1230

Area
  - Total: 26.95 km^{2} (10.41 sq mi)
- Elevation: 130 m (430 ft)

Population (2025)
  - Total: 8,123
- Time zone: UTC+1 (CET)
  - Summer (DST): UTC+2 (CEST)
- Postal code: 900 42
- Area code: +421 26
- Vehicle registration plate (until 2022): SC
- Website: www.dunajskaluzna.sk

Dunajská Lužná (Hungarian: Dénesdtorcsmisérd) is a municipality (village) in the Bratislava Region of western Slovakia in Senec District.

Dunajská Lužná lies approximately 15 km from the capital city of Bratislava towards Dunajská Streda and Komárno. It was founded on 1 January 1974 consisting of three formerly separate villages – Nové Košariská (German: Mischdorf, Hungarian: Misérd), Jánošíková (German: Schildern, Hungarian: Dénesd) and Nová Lipnica (German: Tartschendorf, Hungarian: Torcs). Dunajská Lužná belongs to the vicinity of Bratislava. There is increasing building activity because of new inhabitants coming from Bratislava or other cities.

Not far from the municipality towards Senec lie two lakes - Malá Voda and Piesková Jama. They are used for fishing and bathing and in summer months they are quite crowded. Near the township runs a dam, protecting the villages and townships all the way from Bratislava to Gabčíkovo from flooding of the Danube River.

There is a large Roman Catholic community in Dunajská Lužná with the Church, devoted to "The Elevation of the Holy Cross". Besides Roman Catholics there are also Lutherans and other religions.

== Geography ==
The municipality lies at an altitude of 130 metres (430 ft) and covers an area of 26.95 km^{2} (10.41 sq mi) (2025).

== History ==
The village crest shows St. Martin of Tours.

The municipality of Dunajská Lužná is also well known in European archaeology for its burial mound which dates from around 700 - 500 BCE. During the archaeological survey in the "Nové Košariská" part of the municipality, a necropolis with fire-type burials and a central earth-grave was studied. Archaeogolists found richly decorated ceramic bins here, although only few metallic objects were retrieved.

The once three separate villages belonged to the German language area but the majority of the German population was expelled at the end of World War II.

In January 2004, a permanent exposition with the name "History and present of the municipality" was opened in Dunajská Lužná and it provides visitors with closer view of the past and present life of the Township.

== Population ==
Population statistic (10 years)
Year	1995	2005	2015	2025
Count	2807	3236	5794	8123
Difference		+15.28%	+79.04%	+40.19%

Population statistic
Year	2024	2025
Count	8096	8123
Difference		+0.33%

It has a population of 8123 people (31 December 2025).

=== Ethnicity ===
Census 2021 (1+ %)
Ethnicity	Number	Fraction
Slovak	6650	87.24%
Not found out	546	7.16%
Hungarian	290	3.8%
Czech	90	1.18%
Other	83	1.08%
Total	7622	

In year 2021 was 7622 people by ethnicity 6650 as Slovak, 546 as Not found out, 290 as Hungarian, 90 as Czech, 83 as Other, 70 as Ukrainian, 39 as Romani, 37 as German, 34 as Rusyn, 34 as Russian, 24 as Polish, 15 as Romanian, 13 as Serbian, 12 as Croatian, 9 as Austrian, 9 as Moravian, 7 as Bulgarian, 5 as Jewish, 5 as Albanian, 3 as Irish, 3 as Italian, 3 as French, 3 as English, 2 as Canadian and 1 as Chinese.

Note on population: The difference values of population numbers in the table "Population statistic" and in the sections "Ethnicity" & "Religion" is caused by the use of various statistical methods.

=== Religion ===
Census 2021 (1+ %)
Religion	Number	Fraction
Roman Catholic Church	3488	45.76%
None	2777	36.43%
Not found out	546	7.16%
Evangelical Church	397	5.21%
Greek Catholic Church	102	1.34%
Total	7622	

In year 2021 was 7622 people by religion 3488 from Roman Catholic Church, 2777 from None, 546 from Not found out, 397 from Evangelical Church, 102 from Greek Catholic Church, 74 from Eastern Orthodox Church, 71 from Other, 30 from Ad hoc movements, 25 from Calvinist Church, 18 from Buddhism, 16 from Jehovah's Witnesses, 12 from Islam, 11 from Christian Congregations in Slovakia, 10 from Paganism and natural spirituality, 10 from Apostolic Church, 8 from Other and not ascertained christian church, 7 from Hinduism, 7 from Church of the Brethren, 6 from Jewish community, 3 from Old Catholic Church, 3 from Baptists Church and 1 from Seventh-day Adventist Church.

Due to its proximity near Austria and Hungary the village boasts a strong ethnic mix, with up to fourteen different nationalities calling the village home.

One of these is Dunajská Lužná's strong Roma population, which is renowned for their skills as blacksmiths, and much of the ironwork seen in and around Bratislava is the craft of these smiths.

According to the 2011 census, the municipality had 4,482 inhabitants. 4,023 of inhabitants were Slovaks, 214 Hungarians, 45 Czechs, 22 Germans and 178 others and unspecified.

According to the 2021 census, the municipality had 7,622 inhabitants. 86.34% of inhabitants were Slovaks, and 3.23% were Hungarians.

== See also ==
- List of municipalities and towns in Slovakia

== Genealogical resources ==
The records for genealogical research are available at the state archive "Statny Archiv in Bratislava, Slovakia"
