= Lehota pod Vtáčnikom =

- Municipality
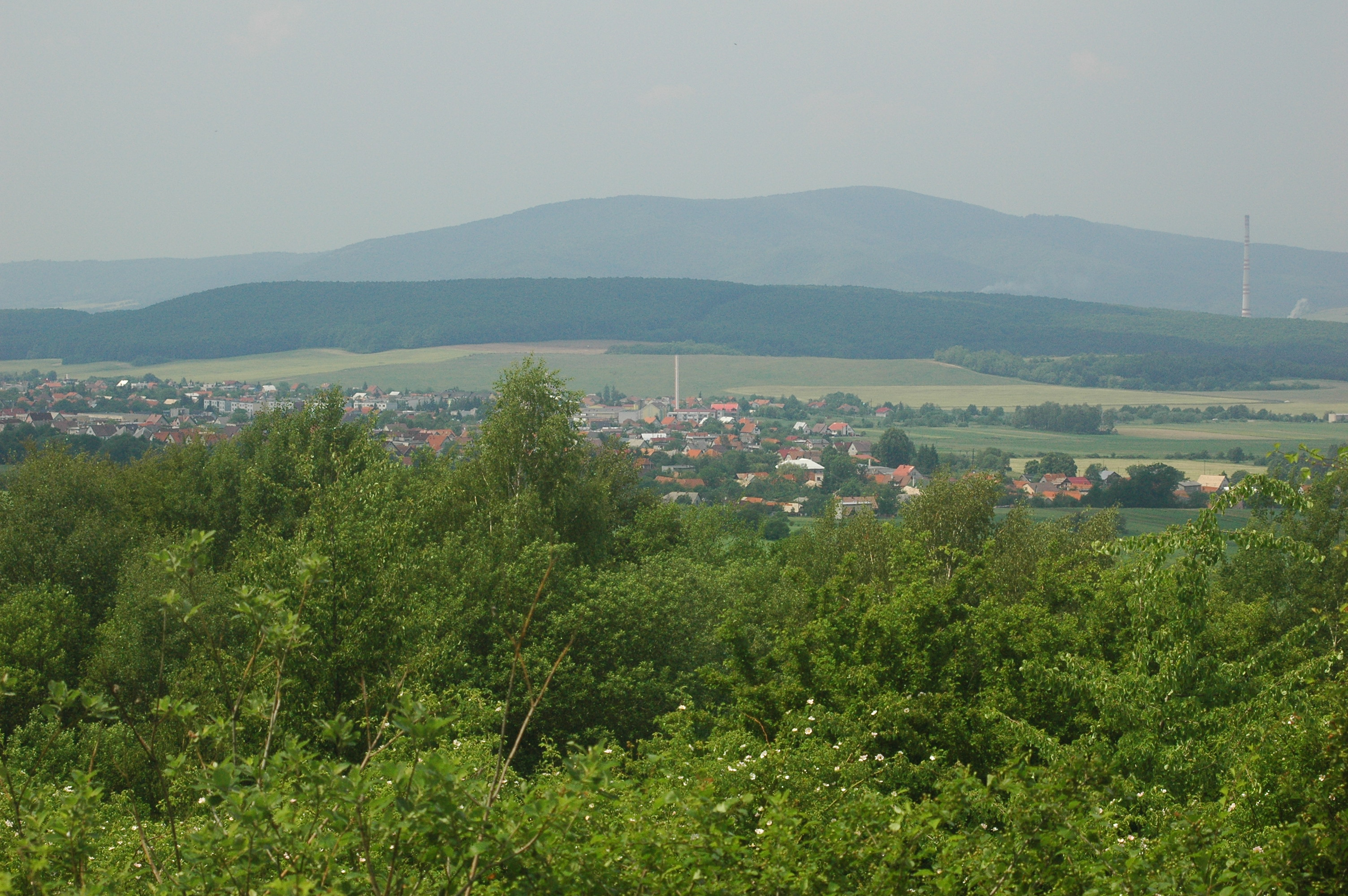

- Flag

- Location of Lehota pod Vtáčnikom in the Trenčín Region Location of Lehota pod Vtáčnikom in Slovakia
- Coordinates: 48.70°N 18.60°E
- Country: Slovakia
- Region: Trenčín Region
- District: Prievidza District
- First mentioned: 1362

Area
  - Total: 27.97 km^{2} (10.80 sq mi)
- Elevation: 384 m (1,260 ft)

Population (2025)
  - Total: 3,648
- Time zone: UTC+1 (CET)
  - Summer (DST): UTC+2 (CEST)
- Postal code: 972 42
- Area code: +421 46
- Vehicle registration plate (until 2022): PD
- Website: www.lehotapodvtacnikom.sk

Lehota pod Vtáčnikom (Hungarian: Papszabadi) is a village and municipality in Prievidza District in the Trenčín Region of western Slovakia.

== History ==
In historical records the village was first mentioned in 1362. In Lehota pod Vtáčnikom the Football club OFK Baník Lehota pod Vtáčnikom.

== Geography ==
The municipality lies at an altitude of 384 metres (1,260 ft) and covers an area of 27.97 km^{2} (10.80 sq mi) (2025).

== Population ==
Population statistic (10 years)
Year	1995	2005	2015	2025
Count	3701	3795	3937	3648
Difference		+2.53%	+3.74%	−7.34%

Population statistic
Year	2024	2025
Count	3697	3648
Difference		−1.32%

It has a population of 3648 people (31 December 2025).

=== Ethnicity ===
Census 2021 (1+ %)
Ethnicity	Number	Fraction
Slovak	3626	95.04%
Not found out	187	4.9%
Total	3815	

In year 2021 was 3815 people by ethnicity 3626 as Slovak, 187 as Not found out, 12 as Czech, 5 as Hungarian, 4 as Italian, 2 as German, 1 as Ukrainian, 1 as Romani, 1 as Russian, 1 as Polish, 1 as Moravian, 1 as Other and 1 as Croatian.

Note on population: The difference values of population numbers in the table "Population statistic" and in the sections "Ethnicity" & "Religion" is caused by the use of various statistical methods.

=== Religion ===
Census 2021 (1+ %)
Religion	Number	Fraction
Roman Catholic Church	2714	71.14%
None	811	21.26%
Not found out	185	4.85%
Total	3815	

In year 2021 was 3815 people by religion 2714 from Roman Catholic Church, 811 from None, 185 from Not found out, 22 from Christian Congregations in Slovakia, 21 from Evangelical Church, 15 from Ad hoc movements, 13 from Greek Catholic Church, 8 from Other, 6 from Other and not ascertained christian church, 6 from Jehovah's Witnesses, 5 from Calvinist Church, 2 from Eastern Orthodox Church, 2 from Paganism and natural spirituality, 2 from Buddhism, 1 from Old Catholic Church, 1 from Hinduism and 1 from Apostolic Church.
