= Trávnica =

Trávnica Barsfüss
- Municipality
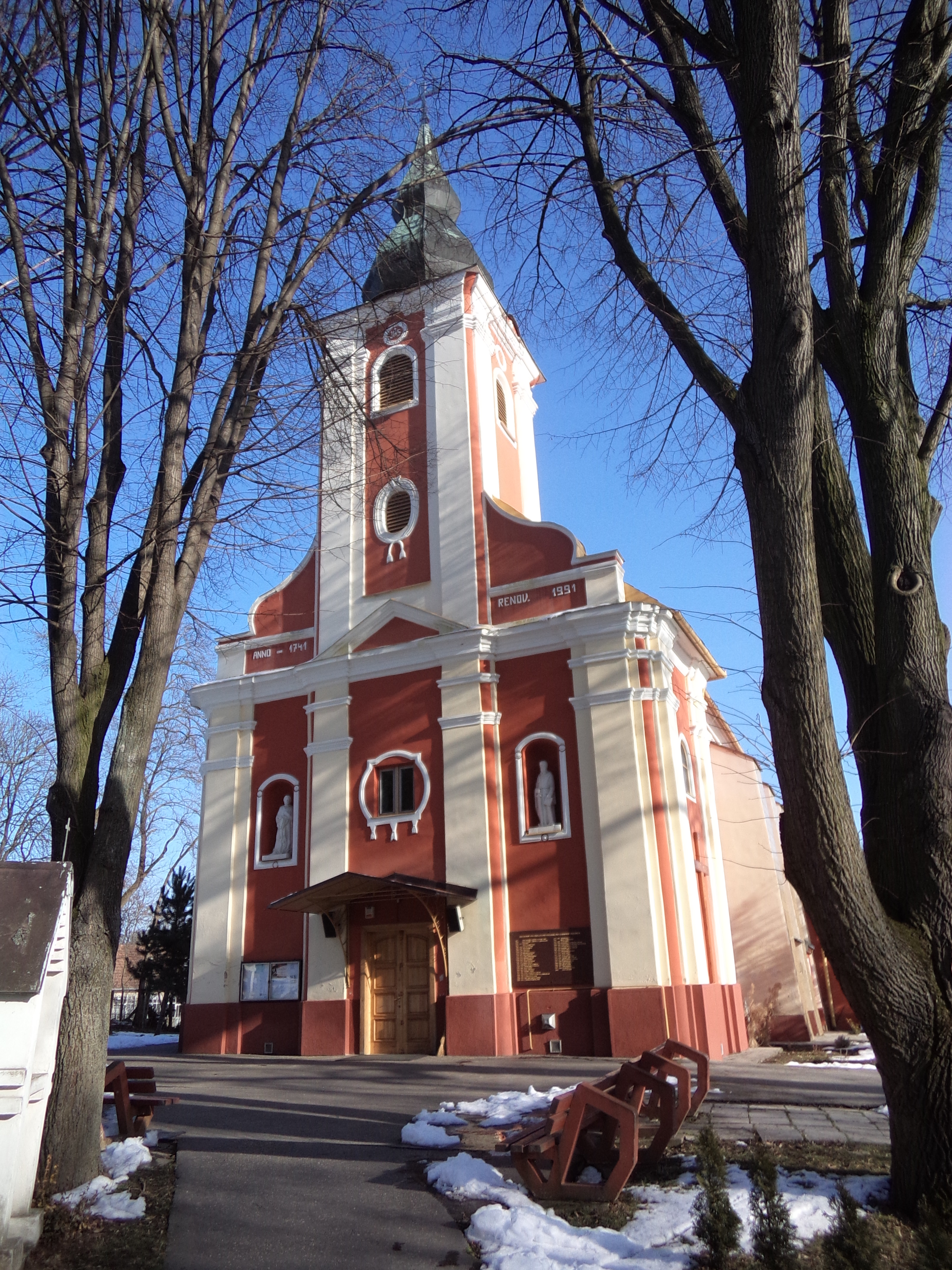

- Flag

- Location of Trávnica in the Nitra Region Location of Trávnica in Slovakia
- Coordinates: 48.15°N 18.33°E
- Country: Slovakia
- Region: Nitra Region
- District: Nové Zámky District
- First mentioned: 1075

Area
  - Total: 21.15 km^{2} (8.17 sq mi)
- Elevation: 156 m (512 ft)

Population (2025)
  - Total: 1,049
- Time zone: UTC+1 (CET)
  - Summer (DST): UTC+2 (CEST)
- Postal code: 941 46
- Area code: +421 35
- Vehicle registration plate (until 2022): NZ
- Website: www.obectravnica.sk

Trávnica (Hungarian: Barsfüss) is a village and municipality in the Nové Zámky District in the Nitra Region of south-west Slovakia.

== History ==
In historical records the village was first mentioned in 1075.

== Geography ==
The municipality lies at an altitude of 156 metres (512 ft) and covers an area of 21.15 km^{2} (8.17 sq mi) (2025).

== Population ==
Population statistic (10 years)
| Year | 1995 | 2005 | 2015 | 2025 |
|---|---|---|---|---|
| Count | 1322 | 1180 | 1081 | 1049 |
| Difference | | −10.74% | −8.38% | −2.96% |

Population statistic
| Year | 2024 | 2025 |
|---|---|---|
| Count | 1041 | 1049 |
| Difference | | +0.76% |

It has a population of 1049 people (31 December 2025).

=== Ethnicity ===
Census 2021 (1+ %)
| Ethnicity | Number | Fraction |
|---|---|---|
| Slovak | 985 | 95.44% |
| Not found out | 36 | 3.48% |
| Hungarian | 15 | 1.45% |
| Total | 1032 | |

In year 2021 was 1032 people by ethnicity 985 as Slovak, 36 as Not found out, 15 as Hungarian, 6 as Czech, 3 as Russian, 2 as Other, 1 as Ukrainian, 1 as Polish and 1 as Croatian.

Note on population: The difference values of population numbers in the table "Population statistic" and in the sections "Ethnicity" & "Religion" is caused by the use of various statistical methods.

=== Religion ===
Census 2021 (1+ %)
| Religion | Number | Fraction |
|---|---|---|
| Roman Catholic Church | 813 | 78.78% |
| None | 157 | 15.21% |
| Not found out | 37 | 3.59% |
| Total | 1032 | |

In year 2021 was 1032 people by religion 813 from Roman Catholic Church, 157 from None, 37 from Not found out, 8 from Evangelical Church, 5 from Christian Congregations in Slovakia, 2 from Calvinist Church, 2 from Other and not ascertained christian church, 2 from Other, 2 from Greek Catholic Church, 1 from Paganism and natural spirituality, 1 from Islam, 1 from Buddhism and 1 from Ad hoc movements.

== Facilities ==
The village has a small public library and a football pitch.
