= Opatovce nad Nitrou =

- Municipality
- Flag

- Location of Opatovce nad Nitrou in the Trenčín Region Location of Opatovce nad Nitrou in Slovakia
- Coordinates: 48.77°N 18.57°E
- Country: Slovakia
- Region: Trenčín Region
- District: Prievidza District
- First mentioned: 1113

Area
  - Total: 9.17 km^{2} (3.54 sq mi)
- Elevation: 258 m (846 ft)

Population (2025)
  - Total: 1,528
- Time zone: UTC+1 (CET)
  - Summer (DST): UTC+2 (CEST)
- Postal code: 972 02
- Area code: +421 46
- Vehicle registration plate (until 2022): PD
- Website: www.opatovcenadnitrou.sk

Opatovce nad Nitrou (Hungarian: Bajmócapáti) is a village and municipality in Prievidza District in the Trenčín Region of western Slovakia.

== History ==
In historical records the village was first mentioned in 1113.

== Geography ==
The municipality lies at an altitude of 258 metres (846 ft) and covers an area of 9.17 km^{2} (3.54 sq mi) (2025).

== Population ==
Population statistic (10 years)
Year	1995	2005	2015	2025
Count	1493	1447	1591	1528
Difference		−3.08%	+9.95%	−3.95%

Population statistic
Year	2024	2025
Count	1517	1528
Difference		+0.72%

It has a population of 1528 people (31 December 2025).

=== Ethnicity ===
Census 2021 (1+ %)
Ethnicity	Number	Fraction
Slovak	1532	98.71%
Not found out	18	1.15%
Total	1552	

In year 2021 was 1552 people by ethnicity 1532 as Slovak, 18 as Not found out, 9 as Czech, 6 as Other, 5 as German, 3 as Russian, 2 as Austrian, 1 as Vietnamese and 1 as Hungarian.

Note on population: The difference values of population numbers in the table "Population statistic" and in the sections "Ethnicity" & "Religion" is caused by the use of various statistical methods.

=== Religion ===
Census 2021 (1+ %)
Religion	Number	Fraction
Roman Catholic Church	999	64.37%
None	466	30.03%
Not found out	25	1.61%
Evangelical Church	17	1.1%
Total	1552	

In year 2021 was 1552 people by religion 999 from Roman Catholic Church, 466 from None, 25 from Not found out, 17 from Evangelical Church, 8 from Christian Congregations in Slovakia, 7 from Other, 7 from Greek Catholic Church, 6 from Jehovah's Witnesses, 5 from Other and not ascertained christian church, 4 from Ad hoc movements, 2 from Seventh-day Adventist Church, 1 from Eastern Orthodox Church, 1 from Paganism and natural spirituality, 1 from Islam, 1 from Hinduism, 1 from Czechoslovak Hussite Church and 1 from Buddhism.
