= Buzitka =

Buzitka Bozita
- Municipality
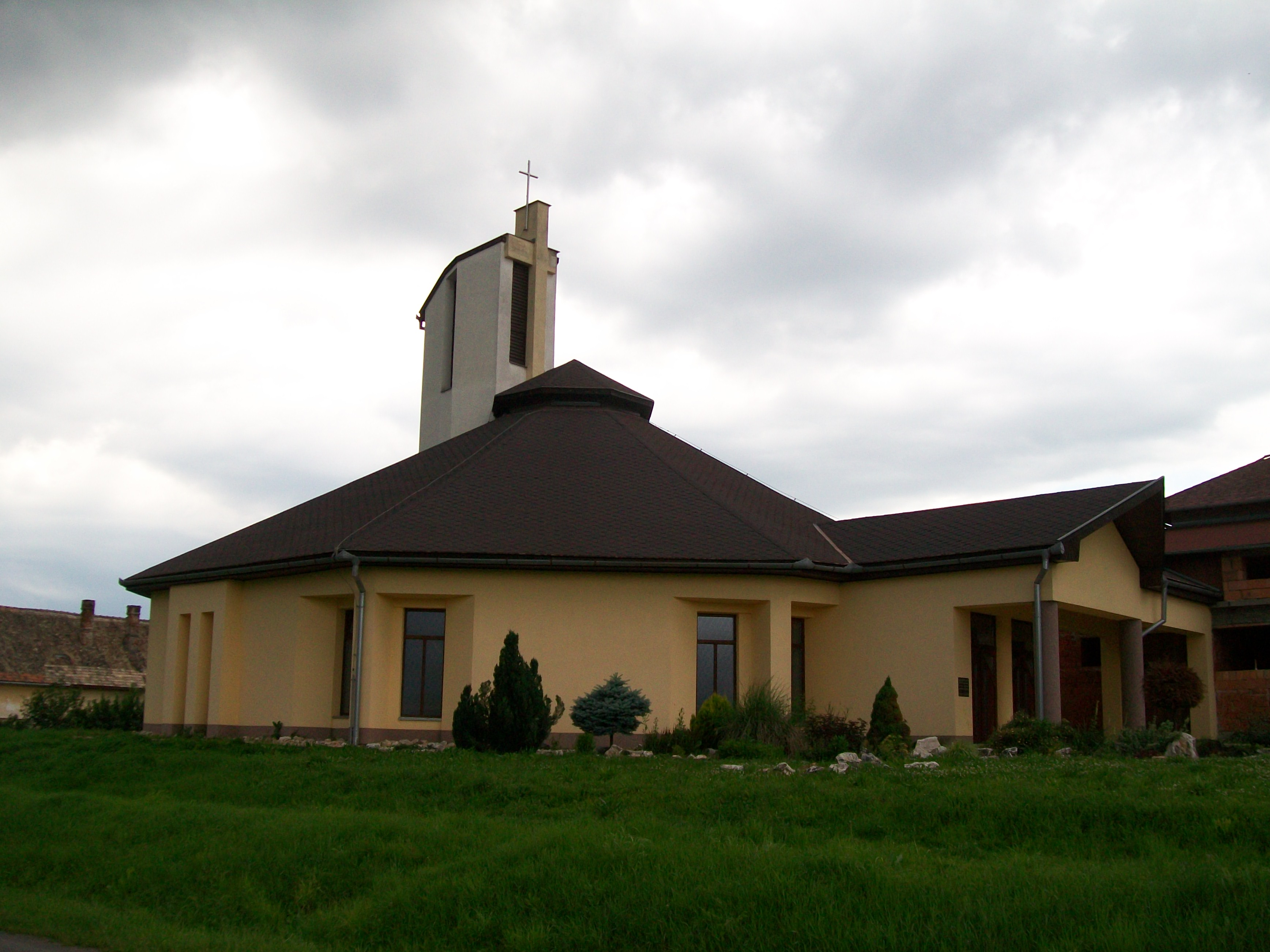
- Roman Catholic church in Buzitka

- Flag

- Location of Buzitka in the Banská Bystrica Region Location of Buzitka in Slovakia
- Coordinates: 48.42°N 19.43°E
- Country: Slovakia
- Region: Banská Bystrica Region
- District: Lučenec District
- First mentioned: 1350

Area
  - Total: 13.80 km^{2} (5.33 sq mi)
- Elevation: 205 m (673 ft)

Population (2025)
  - Total: 446
- Time zone: UTC+1 (CET)
  - Summer (DST): UTC+2 (CEST)
- Postal code: 985 41
- Area code: +421 47
- Vehicle registration plate (until 2022): LC
- Website: buzitkaobec.sk

Buzitka (Hungarian: Bozita) is a village and municipality in the Lučenec District in the Banská Bystrica Region of Slovakia.

== Geography ==
The municipality lies at an altitude of 205 metres (673 ft) and covers an area of 13.80 km^{2} (5.33 sq mi) (2025).

== History ==
In historical records, the village was first mentioned in 1350 (Bozyta) when it belonged to Fil'akovo. From 1554 to 1595 it was occupied by the Ottoman Empire. In 1625, when it was ruled by the family Serényi, it paid tributes to Turks.

== Population ==
Population statistic (10 years)
Year	1995	2005	2015	2025
Count	547	517	503	446
Difference		−5.48%	−2.70%	−11.33%

Population statistic
Year	2024	2025
Count	453	446
Difference		−1.54%

It has a population of 446 people (31 December 2025).

=== Ethnicity ===
Census 2021 (1+ %)
Ethnicity	Number	Fraction
Slovak	423	88.49%
Hungarian	50	10.46%
Not found out	11	2.3%
Czech	9	1.88%
Total	478	

In year 2021 was 478 people by ethnicity 423 as Slovak, 50 as Hungarian, 11 as Not found out, 9 as Czech, 3 as Other and 1 as Romanian.

Note on population: The difference values of population numbers in the table "Population statistic" and in the sections "Ethnicity" & "Religion" is caused by the use of various statistical methods.

=== Religion ===
Census 2021 (1+ %)
Religion	Number	Fraction
Roman Catholic Church	309	64.64%
None	104	21.76%
Evangelical Church	43	9%
Not found out	10	2.09%
Total	478	

In year 2021 was 478 people by religion 309 from Roman Catholic Church, 104 from None, 43 from Evangelical Church, 10 from Not found out, 3 from Calvinist Church, 3 from Greek Catholic Church, 2 from Paganism and natural spirituality, 1 from Christian Congregations in Slovakia, 1 from Other, 1 from Buddhism and 1 from Ad hoc movements.
