= Oravce =

Oravce Oróc
- Municipality
- Flag

- Location of Oravce in the Banská Bystrica Region Location of Oravce in Slovakia
- Coordinates: 48.68°N 19.27°E
- Country: Slovakia
- Region: Banská Bystrica Region
- District: Banská Bystrica District
- First mentioned: 1557

Area
  - Total: 4.72 km^{2} (1.82 sq mi)
- Elevation: 427 m (1,401 ft)

Population (2025)
  - Total: 181
- Time zone: UTC+1 (CET)
  - Summer (DST): UTC+2 (CEST)
- Postal code: 976 33
- Area code: +421 48
- Vehicle registration plate (until 2022): BB
- Website: oravce.sk

Oravce (Hungarian: Oróc) is a village and municipality in Banská Bystrica District in the Banská Bystrica Region of central Slovakia.

== History ==
In historical records the village was first mentioned in 1557.

== Geography ==
The municipality lies at an altitude of 427 metres (1,401 ft) and covers an area of 4.72 km^{2} (1.82 sq mi) (2025).

== Population ==
Population statistic (10 years)
Year	1995	2005	2015	2025
Count	135	180	181	181
Difference		+33.33%	+0.55%	+0%

Population statistic
Year	2024	2025
Count	185	181
Difference		−2.16%

It has a population of 181 people (31 December 2025).

=== Ethnicity ===
Census 2021 (1+ %)
Ethnicity	Number	Fraction
Slovak	172	97.17%
Not found out	5	2.82%
Total	177	

In year 2021 was 177 people by ethnicity 172 as Slovak and 5 as Not found out.

Note on population: The difference values of population numbers in the table "Population statistic" and in the sections "Ethnicity" & "Religion" is caused by the use of various statistical methods.

=== Religion ===
Census 2021 (1+ %)
Religion	Number	Fraction
Evangelical Church	101	57.06%
Roman Catholic Church	39	22.03%
None	29	16.38%
Not found out	5	2.82%
Total	177	

In year 2021 was 177 people by religion 101 from Evangelical Church, 39 from Roman Catholic Church, 29 from None, 5 from Not found out, 1 from Calvinist Church, 1 from Other and 1 from Greek Catholic Church.
