= Farma season 9 =

Farma
- Season 9
- Presented by: Kveta Horváthová
- No. of days: 14 weeks
- No. of housemates: 21
- Winner: Šimon
- Runner-up: Michala

Release
- Original network: Markíza
- Original release: September 7 – December 15, 2017

Season chronology
- ← Previous; Season 8 Next → Season 10

Farma 9 (The Farm 9) is the 9th season of the Slovak version of The Farm reality television show based on the Swedish television series of the same name. The show was filmed from September 2017 to December 2017 and premiered on September 7, 2017 on Markíza.

== Format ==
Twelve contestants are chosen from the outside world. Each week one contestant is selected the Farmer of the Week. In the first week, the contestants choose the Farmer. Since week 2, the Farmer is chosen by the contestant evicted in the previous week.

=== Nomination process ===
The Farmer of the Week nominates two people (a man and a woman) as the Butlers. The others must decide which Butler is the first to go to the Battle. That person then chooses the second person (from the same sex) for the Battle and also the type of battle (a quiz, extrusion, endurance, sleight). The Battle winner must win two duels. The Battle loser is evicted from the game.

Ages stated are at time of contest.

Contestant	Age	Background	Hometown	Status	Finish
Ladislav Krajčovič	64	Retired	Dolná Krupá	Evacuated; Week 1	21st
Ivana Slabá	20	Student	Považská Bystrica	Quit; Week 1	20th
Ján Solárik	47	Businessman	Žilina	Quit; Week 2	19th
Peter Poruban	29	Gardener	Saint-Tropez	1st Evicted; Week 2	18th
Jaroslav Hudacký	37	Army retired	Trebišov	2nd Evicted; Week 3	17th
Frederika Lukyová	21	Unemployed	Žiar nad Hronom	Quit; Week 4	16th
Tomáš "Tomy Kotty" Drahoš	25	Musician, dancer	Bratislava	Evacuated; Week 7	15th
Lenka Botková	30	Unemployed	Tisovec	5th Evicted; Week 7	14th
Stanislav Madzík	30	Waiter	Poprad	6th Evicted; Week 8	13th
Eva Zelníková	22	Businesswoman	Kysucké Nové Mesto	Ejected; Week 9	12th
Dáša Sabová	31	Manageress	Trenčín	7th Evicted; Week 9	11th
Martin Urban	26	Waiter	Záhorská Bystrica	8th Evicted; Week 10	10th
Ivana Auxtová	32	Playground owner	Čierny Balog	9th Evicted; Week 11	9th
Miroslav Gábriš	64	Retired	Bobrovec	10th Evicted; Week 11	8th
Pavol Lihocký	38	Demolition worker	Handlová	11th Evicted; Week 12	7th
Jozef Bohdan	40	Carver	Podlužany	12th Evicted; Week 13	6th
Petra Palusková	25	Model	Prague	13th Evicted; Week 14	5th
Jana Volnová	47	Beautician	Podhradie	14th Evicted; Week 14	4th
Anna Auxtová †	52	Tavern owner	Čierny Balog	15th Evicted; Week 14	3rd
Michala Kiripolská	25	Unemployed	Trnovec nad Váhom	Runner-up; Week 14	2nd
Šimon Néma	26	Florist	Dolné Lefantovce	Winner; Week 14	1st

=== Nominations ===
	Week 1	Week 2	Week 3	Week 4	Week 5	Week 6	Week 7	Week 8	Week 9	Week 10	Week 11	Week 12	Week 13	Week 14			Final
Farmer of the Week (Immunity)	Ján	Stanislav	Jozef	Anna	Tomáš	Eva	Dáša	Eva	Martin	Jozef	Petra	Jana	Anna	None	Michala		None
Buttlers	Anna; Šimon	Dáša; Jozef	Eva; Šimon	Frederika; Tomáš	Lenka; Stanislav	Jana; Jozef	Lenka; Martin	Jana; Šimon	Dáša; Šimon	Ivana; Pavol	Ivana; Miroslav	Anna; Pavol	Jana; Jozef	None		Anna; Šimon	None
Šimon	Buttler		Buttler; 1st Dueler					Buttler; 1st Dueler	Buttler				2nd Dueler	Buttler	Buttler	Buttler; 2nd Dueler	Winner (Week 14)
Michala	Not in The Farm						2nd Dueler				2nd Dueler			Buttler	Farmer of the Week		Runner-Up (Week 14)
Anna	Buttler; 1st Dueler			Farmer of the Week								Buttler	Farmer of the Week	Buttler	Buttler	Buttler; 1st Dueler	3rd Place (Week 14)
Jana						Buttler		Buttler				Farmer of the Week	Buttler	Buttler	Buttler	Evicted (Week 14)	
Petra	Not in The Farm										Farmer of the Week			Buttler	Evicted (Week 14)		
Jozef		Buttler; 1st Dueler	Farmer of the Week			Buttler; 1st Dueler	Evicted (Week 6)			Farmer of the Week	2nd Dueler	2nd Dueler	Buttler; 1st Dueler	Evicted (Week 13)			
Pavol	Not in The Farm									Buttler; 1st Dueler		Buttler; 1st Dueler	Evicted (Week 12)				
Miroslav	Not in The Farm										Buttler; 1st Dueler	Evicted (Week 11)					
Ivana	Not in The Farm								2nd Dueler	Buttler	Buttler; 1st Dueler	Evicted (Week 11)					
Martin	Not in The Farm					2nd Dueler	Buttler		Farmer of the Week	2nd Dueler	Evicted (Week 10)						
Dáša		Buttler			2nd Dueler		Farmer of the Week		Buttler; 1st Dueler	Evicted (Week 9)							
Eva			Buttler	2nd Dueler		Farmer of the Week		Farmer of the Week		Ejected (Week 9)							
Stanislav		Farmer of the Week			Buttler		Evacuated (Week 6)	2nd Dueler	Evicted (Week 8)								
Lenka					Buttler; 1st Dueler	Evicted (Week 5)	Buttler; 1st Dueler	Evicted (Week 7)									
Tomáš	Not in The Farm			Buttler	Farmer of the Week			Evacuated (Week 7)									
Frederika	Not in The Farm			Buttler; 1st Dueler	Quit (Week 4)												
Jaroslav	Not in The Farm		2nd Dueler	Evicted (Week 3)													
Peter		2nd Dueler	Evicted (Week 2)														
Ján	Farmer of the Week		Quit (Week 2)														
Ivana S.	2nd Dueler	Quit (Week 1)															
Ladislav		Evacuated (Week 1)															
Evacuated	Ladislav	None				Stanislav	Tomáš	None									
Quit	Ivana S.	Ján	None	Frederika	None												
Ejected	None								Eva	None							
1st Dueler (By Group)	Anna	Jozef	Šimon	Frederika	Lenka	Jozef	Lenka	Šimon	Dáša	Pavol	Ivana; Miroslav	Pavol	Jozef	None			
2nd Dueler (By 1st Dueler)	Ivana S.	Peter	Jaroslav	Eva	Dáša	Martin	Michala	Stanislav	Ivana	Martin	Michala; Jozef	Jozef	Šimon	None			
Evicted	Duel cancelled	Peter; Lost duel	Jaroslav; Lost duel	Duel cancelled	Lenka; Lost duel	Lenka; Returned	Jozef; Returned	Stanislav; Returned	Dáša; Lost duel	Martin; Lost duel	Ivana; Lost duel	Pavol; Lost duel	Jozef; Lost duel	Petra; Voted out	Jana; Voted out	Anna; Lost duel	Michala; Runner-up; Lost final duel
Evicted	Duel cancelled	Peter; Lost duel	Jaroslav; Lost duel	Duel cancelled	Lenka; Lost duel	Jozef; Lost duel	Lenka; Lost duel	Stanislav; Lost duel	Dáša; Lost duel	Martin; Lost duel	Miroslav; Lost duel	Pavol; Lost duel	Jozef; Lost duel	Petra; Voted out	Jana; Voted out	Anna; Lost duel	Šimon; Winner; Wins final duel

== The game ==
Week	Farmer of the Week	Butlers	1st Dueler	2nd Dueler	Evicted	Finish
1	Ján	Anna; Šimon	Anna	Ivana	Ladislav	Evacuated; Day 4
1	Ján	Anna; Šimon	Anna	Ivana	Ivana	Quit; Day 7
2	Stanislav	Dáša; Jozef	Jozef	Peter	Ján	Quit; Day 11
2	Stanislav	Dáša; Jozef	Jozef	Peter	Peter	1st Evicted
3	Jozef	Eva; Šimon	Šimon	Jaroslav	Jaroslav	2nd Evicted
4	Anna	Frederika; Tomáš	Frederika	Eva	Frederika	Quit
5	Tomáš	Lenka; Stanislav	Lenka	Dáša	Lenka	3rd Evicted
6	Eva	Jana; Jozef	Jozef	Martin	Stanislav	Evacuated
6	Eva	Jana; Jozef	Jozef	Martin	Lenka	Returned
6	Eva	Jana; Jozef	Jozef	Martin	Jozef	4th Evicted
7	Dáša	Lenka; Martin	Lenka	Michala	Tomáš	Evacuated
7	Dáša	Lenka; Martin	Lenka	Michala	Jozef	Returned
7	Dáša	Lenka; Martin	Lenka	Michala	Lenka	5th Evicted
8	Eva	Jana; Šimon	Šimon	Stanislav	Stanislav	Returned
8	Eva	Jana; Šimon	Šimon	Stanislav	Stanislav	6th Evicted
9	Martin	Dáša; Šimon	Dáša	Ivana	Eva	Ejected
9	Martin	Dáša; Šimon	Dáša	Ivana	Dáša	7th Evicted
10	Jozef	Ivana; Pavol	Pavol	Martin	Martin	8th Evicted
11	Petra	Ivana; Miroslav	Ivana	Michala	Ivana	9th Evicted
11	Petra	Ivana; Miroslav	Miroslav	Jozef	Miroslav	10th Evicted
12	Jana	Anna; Pavol	Pavol	Jozef	Pavol	11th Evicted
13	Anna	Jana; Jozef	Jozef	Šimon	Jozef	12th Evicted
14	None	Anna; Šimon	Jury's Vote	None	Petra	13th Evicted
14	None	Anna; Šimon	Jury's Vote	None	Jana	14th Evicted
14	None	Anna; Šimon	Anna	Šimon	Anna	15th Evicted
Final Duel					Michala	Runner-up
Final Duel					Šimon	Winner
