= Harichovce =

Village and municipality in Slovakia

Harichovce Pálmafalva
- Municipality
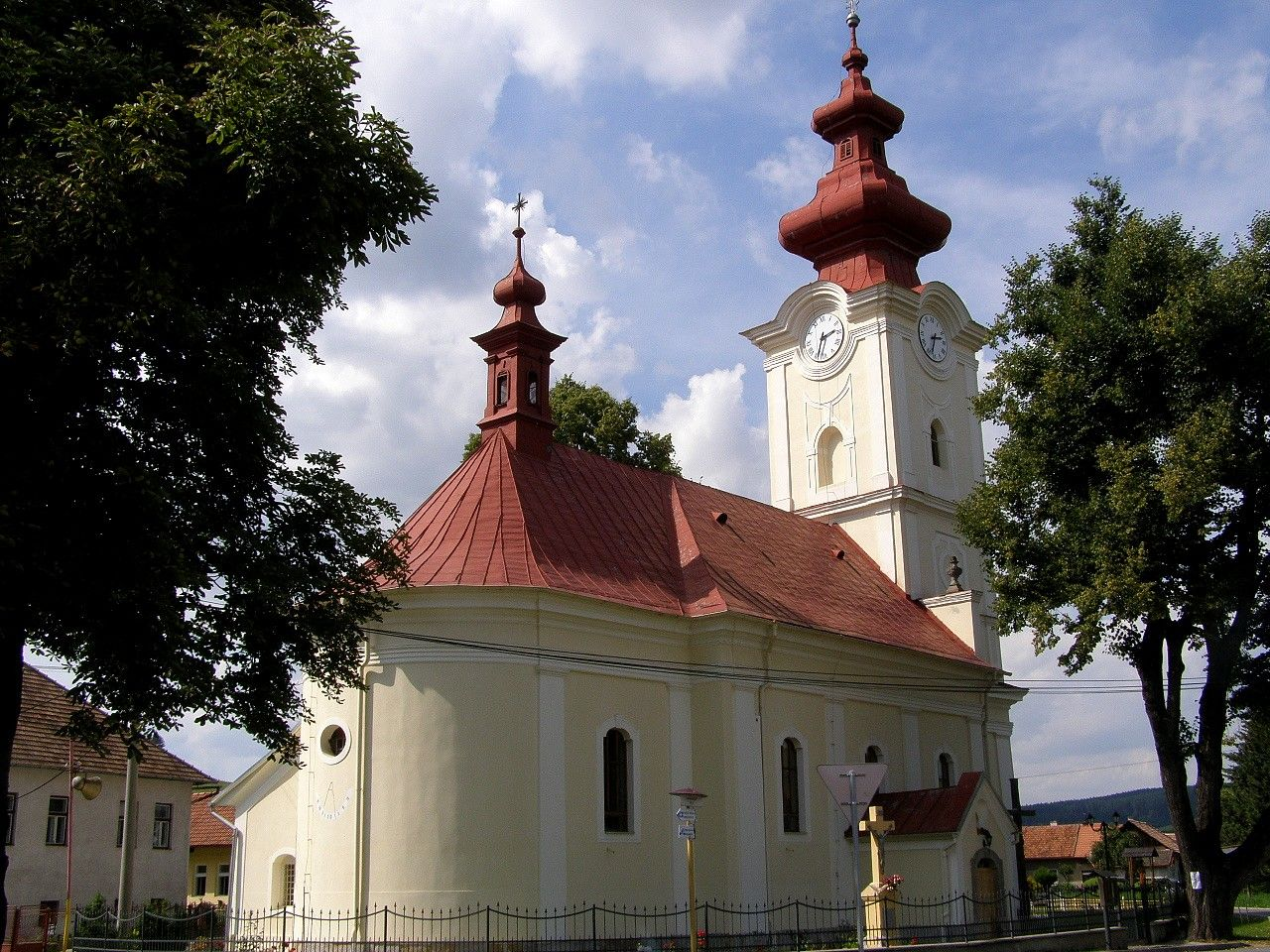

- Flag

- Location of Harichovce in the Košice Region Location of Harichovce in Slovakia
- Coordinates: 48.97°N 20.58°E
- Country: Slovakia
- Region: Košice Region
- District: Spišská Nová Ves District
- First mentioned: 1268

Area
  - Total: 10.79 km^{2} (4.17 sq mi)
- Elevation: 451 m (1,480 ft)

Population (2025)
  - Total: 1,888
- Time zone: UTC+1 (CET)
  - Summer (DST): UTC+2 (CEST)
- Postal code: 530 1
- Area code: +421 53
- Vehicle registration plate (until 2022): SN
- Website: www.harichovce.sk

Harichovce (Hungarian: Pálmafalva) is a village and municipality in the Spišská Nová Ves District in the Košice Region of central-eastern Slovakia.

== History ==
In historical records the village was first mentioned in 1268.

== Geography ==
The municipality lies at an altitude of 451 metres (1,480 ft) and covers an area of 10.79 km^{2} (4.17 sq mi) (2025).

== Population ==
Population statistic (10 years)
Year	1995	2005	2015	2025
Count	1550	1739	1879	1888
Difference		+12.19%	+8.05%	+0.47%

Population statistic
Year	2024	2025
Count	1891	1888
Difference		−0.15%

It has a population of 1888 people (31 December 2025).

=== Ethnicity ===
Census 2021 (1+ %)
Ethnicity	Number	Fraction
Slovak	1811	98.31%
Not found out	22	1.19%
Total	1842	

In year 2021 was 1842 people by ethnicity 1811 as Slovak, 22 as Not found out, 18 as Rusyn, 11 as Czech, 6 as Other, 4 as Ukrainian, 4 as Polish, 2 as German, 2 as Hungarian, 1 as Jewish, 1 as Russian and 1 as Greek.

Note on population: The difference values of population numbers in the table "Population statistic" and in the sections "Ethnicity" & "Religion" is caused by the use of various statistical methods.

=== Religion ===
Census 2021 (1+ %)
Religion	Number	Fraction
Roman Catholic Church	1472	79.91%
None	263	14.28%
Greek Catholic Church	42	2.28%
Evangelical Church	24	1.3%
Total	1842	

In year 2021 was 1842 people by religion 1472 from Roman Catholic Church, 263 from None, 42 from Greek Catholic Church, 24 from Evangelical Church, 14 from Not found out, 7 from Christian Congregations in Slovakia, 6 from Jehovah's Witnesses, 5 from Other, 4 from Ad hoc movements, 2 from Eastern Orthodox Church, 1 from Paganism and natural spirituality, 1 from Hinduism and 1 from United Methodist Church.

== Genealogical resources ==
The records for genealogical research are available at the state archive "Statny Archiv in Levoca, Slovakia"

- Roman Catholic church records (births/marriages/deaths): 1789-1897 (parish A)
- Lutheran church records (births/marriages/deaths): 1783-1896 (parish B)

== See also ==
- List of municipalities and towns in Slovakia
