= Horovce, Michalovce District =

Village and municipality in Slovakia

Horovce Hór
- Municipality
- Flag

- Location of Horovce in the Košice Region Location of Horovce in Slovakia
- Coordinates: 48.71°N 21.77°E
- Country: Slovakia
- Region: Košice Region
- District: Michalovce District
- First mentioned: 1347

Area
  - Total: 13.08 km^{2} (5.05 sq mi)
- Elevation: 106 m (348 ft)

Population (2025)
  - Total: 866
- Time zone: UTC+1 (CET)
  - Summer (DST): UTC+2 (CEST)
- Postal code: 720 2
- Area code: +421 56
- Vehicle registration plate (until 2022): MI
- Website: www.obechorovce.sk

Horovce (Hungarian: Hór) is a village and municipality in Michalovce District in the Kosice Region of eastern Slovakia.

== History ==
In historical records the village was first mentioned in 1347. Before the establishment of independent Czechoslovakia in 1918, it was part of Zemplén County within the Kingdom of Hungary.

== Geography ==
The municipality lies at an altitude of 106 metres (348 ft) and covers an area of 13.08 km^{2} (5.05 sq mi) (2025).

== Population ==
Population statistic (10 years)
| Year | 1995 | 2005 | 2015 | 2025 |
|---|---|---|---|---|
| Count | 886 | 883 | 851 | 866 |
| Difference | | −0.33% | −3.62% | +1.76% |

Population statistic
| Year | 2024 | 2025 |
|---|---|---|
| Count | 879 | 866 |
| Difference | | −1.47% |

It has a population of 866 people (31 December 2025).

=== Ethnicity ===
Census 2021 (1+ %)
| Ethnicity | Number | Fraction |
|---|---|---|
| Slovak | 849 | 97.36% |
| Romani | 86 | 9.86% |
| Not found out | 24 | 2.75% |
| Total | 872 | |

In year 2021 was 872 people by ethnicity 849 as Slovak, 86 as Romani, 24 as Not found out, 6 as Czech, 4 as Hungarian, 3 as Russian, 2 as Ukrainian, 2 as Albanian, 1 as Rusyn and 1 as Other.

Note on population: The difference values of population numbers in the table "Population statistic" and in the sections "Ethnicity" & "Religion" is caused by the use of various statistical methods.

=== Religion ===
Census 2021 (1+ %)
| Religion | Number | Fraction |
|---|---|---|
| Roman Catholic Church | 551 | 63.19% |
| Calvinist Church | 94 | 10.78% |
| Greek Catholic Church | 58 | 6.65% |
| Other | 44 | 5.05% |
| None | 39 | 4.47% |
| Not found out | 26 | 2.98% |
| Evangelical Church | 26 | 2.98% |
| Jehovah's Witnesses | 11 | 1.26% |
| Other and not ascertained christian church | 9 | 1.03% |
| Total | 872 | |

In year 2021 was 872 people by religion 551 from Roman Catholic Church, 94 from Calvinist Church, 58 from Greek Catholic Church, 44 from Other, 39 from None, 26 from Not found out, 26 from Evangelical Church, 11 from Jehovah's Witnesses, 9 from Other and not ascertained christian church, 7 from United Methodist Church, 3 from Ad hoc movements, 2 from Seventh-day Adventist Church, 1 from Eastern Orthodox Church and 1 from Christian Congregations in Slovakia.

== Culture ==
The village has a small public library, a football pitch and a food store.

== Genealogical resources ==
The records for genealogical research are available at the state archive "Statny Archiv in Presov, Slovakia"

- Roman Catholic church records (births/marriages/deaths): 1790-1895 (parish B)
- Greek Catholic church records (births/marriages/deaths): 1804-1923 (parish B)

== See also ==
- List of municipalities and towns in Slovakia
