= Farma season 2 =

Farma
- Season 2
- Presented by: Kveta Horváthová
- No. of days: 98
- No. of housemates: 15
- Winner: Radomír Spireng
- Runner-up: Tomáš Mrva
- Location: Vrbovce, Slovakia
- No. of episodes: 75

Release
- Original network: Markíza
- Original release: 4 March – 12 June 2012

Season chronology
- ← Previous; Farma 1 Next → Farma 3

Farma 2 — Ešte drsnejšia (English: The Farm 2) is the Slovak version of The Farm reality television show based on the Swedish television series of the same name. The show filmed in February–June 2012 and premiered on March 4, 2012 on Markíza.

== Format ==
Fifteen contestants are cut out from outside world. Each week one contestant is selected the Farmer of the Week. On the first week, the contestants choose the Farmer. Since week 2, the Farmer is chosen by the contestant evicted in the previous week.

=== Nomination Process ===
The Farmer of the Week nominates two people (a man and a woman) as the Butlers. The others must decide, which Butler is the first to go to the Battle. That person than choose the second person (from the same sex) for the Battle and also the type of battle (a quiz, tug-of-war, cutting wood, surprise). The Battle winner must win two duels. The Battle loser is evicted from the game. In the live final 16th Juny 2012 Radomír Spireng won 50 000 € . Tomáš Mrva finish on the second place. Radomír Spireng won title Favorit Farmer.

=== Contestants ===
(ages stated are at time of contest)

Contestant	Age	Background	Hometown	Status	Finish
Jana Frčková	45	Businesswoman	Zvolen	1st Evicted; Day 7	15th
Ľubomír Filkor	46	Teacher	Spišská Nová Ves	Removed due to Injury; Day 12	14th
Jarmila Ščibrányová †	55	Chef	Bratislava	2nd Evicted; Day 21	13th
Nikola Komorová	20	Model	Bratislava	Quit; Day 28	12th
Roman Olach	20	Waiter	Partizánske	3rd Evicted; Day 42	11th
Juraj Hambalko	29	Worker	Nové Zámky	4th Evicted; Day 49	10th
Roland Sedláček	31	Unemployed	Jelšovce	5th Evicted; Day 56	9th
Lucia Frčková	27	Maternity leave	Banská Bystrica	6th Evicted; Day 63	8th
Gabriela Bullová	28	Croupier	Šaľa	7th Evicted; Day 70	7th
Adam Kováč	23	Manager	Bratislava	8th Evicted; Day 77	6th
Monika Haklová	37	Real estate agent	Deutsch Jahrndorf	9th Evicted; Day 84	5th
Eva Orolinová	19	Hairdresser	Spišské Bystré	10th Evicted; Day 91	4th
Ľudovíta Mladková	31	Waitress	Malacky	3rd place Day 97	3rd
Tomáš Mrva	24	Footballer	Trnava	Runner-up; Day 98	2nd
Radomír Spireng	39	Interpreter	Žilina	Winner; Day 98	1st

=== Future appearances ===
Roman Olach, Ľubomír Filkor and Tomáš Mrva returned to Farma for Farma: All-Stars, respectively placing 12th and 6th, while Mrva reach the final again.

=== Nominations ===
	Week 1	Week 2	Week 3	Week 4	Week 5	Week 6	Week 7	Week 8	Week 9	Week 10	Week 11	Week 12	Week 13	Week 14	Final
Farmer of the Week (Immunity)	Tomáš	Ľubomír	Adam	Tomáš	Lucia	Adam	Monika	Ľudovíta	Monika	Adam	Ľudovíta	Radomír	Tomáš	Tomáš	None
Buttlers	Jana; Roman	Nikola; Adam	Jarmila; Tomáš	Eva; Roman	Eva; Roland	Monika; Roland	Gabriela; Tomáš	Lucia; Adam	Gabriela; Adam	Gabriela; Radomír	Monika; Adam	Monika; Ľudovíta	Radomír; Ľudovíta	Radomír; Ľudovíta	None
Radomír	Not in The Farm									Buttler	2nd Dueler	Farmer of the Week	Buttler	Buttler; 2nd Dueler	Winner; Day 98
Tomáš	Farmer of the Week		Buttler	Farmer of the Week			Buttler; 1st Dueler		Evicted; Day 56				Farmer of the Week	Farmer of the Week	Runner-Up; Day 98
Ľudovíta	Not in The Farm							Farmer of the Week			Farmer of the Week	Buttler; 2nd Dueler	Buttler; 1st Dueler	Buttler; 1st Dueler	3rd Place; Day 97
Eva				Buttler	Buttler; 1st Dueler								2nd Dueler	Evicted; Day 91	
Monika					2nd Dueler	Buttler	Farmer of the Week		Farmer of the Week	2nd Dueler	Buttler	Buttler; 1st Dueler	Evicted; Day 84		
Adam		Buttler; 1st Dueler	Farmer of the Week			Farmer of the Week		Buttler; 1st Dueler	Buttler	Farmer of the Week	Buttler; 1st Dueler	Evicted; Day 77			
Gabriela	Not in The Farm						Buttler		Buttler; 1st Dueler	Buttler; 1st Dueler	Evicted; Day 70				
Lucia					Farmer of the Week			Buttler	2nd Dueler	Evicted; Day 63					
Roland		2nd Dueler		2nd Dueler	Buttler	Buttler; 1st Dueler		2nd Dueler	Evicted; Day 56						
Juraj	Not in The Farm						2nd Dueler	Evicted; Day 49							
Roman	Buttler			Buttler; 1st Dueler		2nd Dueler	Evicted; Day 42								
Nikola		Buttler	2nd Dueler		Quit; Day 28										
Jarmila	2nd Dueler		Buttler; 1st Dueler	Evicted; Day 21											
Ľubomír		Farmer of the Week	Evacuated; Day 12												
Jana	Buttler; 1st Dueler	Evicted; Day 7													
Evacuated	None	Ľubomír	None												
Quit	None			Nikola	None										
1st Dueler (By Group)	Jana	Adam	Jarmila	Roman	Eva	Roland	Tomáš	Adam	Gabriela	Gabriela	Adam	Monika	Ľudovíta	None	
2nd Dueler (By 1st Dueler)	Jarmila	Roland	Nikola	Roland	Monika	Roman	Juraj	Roland	Lucia	Monika	Radomír	Ľudovíta	Eva	None	
Evicted	Jana; Lost duel	Duel cancelled	Jarmila; Lost duel	Duel cancelled	Eva; Saved	Roman; Lost duel	Juraj; Lost duel	Roland; Lost duel	Lucia; Lost duel	Gabriela; Lost duel	Adam; Lost duel	Monika; Lost duel	Eva; Lost duel	Ľudovíta; Lost duel	Tomáš; Runner-up; Lost final duel
Evicted	Jana; Lost duel	Duel cancelled	Jarmila; Lost duel	Duel cancelled	Eva; Saved	Roman; Lost duel	Juraj; Lost duel	Tomáš; Voted out	Lucia; Lost duel	Gabriela; Lost duel	Adam; Lost duel	Tomáš; Returned	Eva; Lost duel	Ľudovíta; Lost duel	Radomír; Winner; Wins final duel

== The game ==
Week	Farmer of the Week	Buttlers	1st Dueler	Vote	2nd Dueler	Evicted	Finish
1	Tomáš	Jana; Roman	Jana	6-2	Jarmila	Jana	1st Evicted; Day 7
2	Ľubomír	Nikola; Adam	Adam	4-3	Roland	Ľubomír	Evacuated; Day 12
3	Adam	Jarmila; Tomáš	Jarmila	6-0	Nikola	Jarmila	2nd Evicted; Day 21
4	Tomáš	Eva; Roman	Roman	4-1	Roland	Nikola	Quit; Day 28
5	Lucia	Eva; Roland	Eva	3-2	Monika	Eva	Saved; Day 35
6	Adam	Monika; Roland	Roland	3-1	Roman	Roman	3rd Evicted; Day 42
7	Monika	Gabriela; Tomáš	Tomáš	4-3	Juraj	Juraj	4th Evicted; Day 49
8	Ľudovíta	Lucia; Adam	Adam	4-3	Roland	Roland	5th Evicted; Day 56
8	Ľudovíta	Lucia; Adam	Adam	4-3	Roland	Tomáš	6th Evicted; Day 56
9	Monika	Gabriela; Adam	Gabriela	3-1	Lucia	Lucia	7th Evicted; Day 63
10	Adam	Gabriela; Radomír	Gabriela	3-0	Monika	Gabriela	8th Evicted; Day 70
11	Ľudovíta	Monika; Adam	Adam	2-1	Radomír	Adam	9th Evicted; Day 77
12	Radomír	Monika; Ľudovíta	Monika	1-0	Ľudovíta	Monika	10th Evicted; Day 84
12	Radomír	Monika; Ľudovíta	Monika	1-0	Ľudovíta	Tomáš	Return; Day 84
13	Tomáš	Ľudovíta; Radomír	Ľudovíta	1-0	Eva	Eva	11th Evicted; Day 91
14	Tomáš	Ľudovíta; Radomír	Ľudovíta	None	Radomír	Ľudovíta	12th Evicted; Day 97
Final Duel						Tomáš	Runner-up; Day 98
Final Duel						Radomír	Winner; Day 98
