= Ratkovská Suchá =

Ratkovská Suchá Ratkószuha
- Municipality
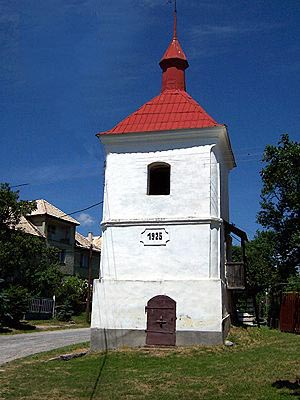

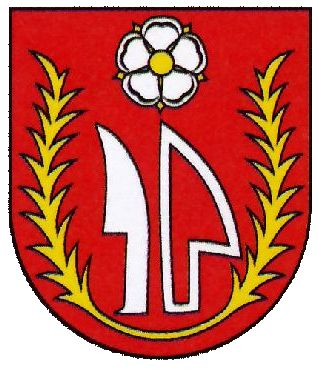
- Flag Coat of arms

- Location of Ratkovská Suchá in the Banská Bystrica Region Location of Ratkovská Suchá in Slovakia
- Coordinates: 48.58°N 20.07°E
- Country: Slovakia
- Region: Banská Bystrica Region
- District: Rimavská Sobota District
- First mentioned: 1323

Area
  - Total: 5.80 km^{2} (2.24 sq mi)
- Elevation: 478 m (1,568 ft)

Population (2025)
  - Total: 38
- Time zone: UTC+1 (CET)
  - Summer (DST): UTC+2 (CEST)
- Postal code: 982 67
- Area code: +421 47
- Vehicle registration plate (until 2022): RS
- Website: www.ratkovskasucha.sk

Ratkovská Suchá (Hungarian: Ratkószuha) is a village and municipality in the Rimavská Sobota District of the Banská Bystrica Region of southern Slovakia.

== Geography ==
The municipality lies at an altitude of 478 metres (1,568 ft) and covers an area of 5.80 km^{2} (2.24 sq mi) (2025).

== Population ==
Population statistic (10 years)
Year	1995	2005	2015	2025
Count	67	70	47	38
Difference		+4.47%	−32.85%	−19.14%

Population statistic
Year	2024	2025
Count	39	38
Difference		−2.56%

It has a population of 38 people (31 December 2025).

=== Ethnicity ===
Census 2021 (1+ %)
Ethnicity	Number	Fraction
Slovak	41	97.61%
Not found out	1	2.38%
Total	42	

In year 2021 was 42 people by ethnicity 41 as Slovak and 1 as Not found out.

Note on population: The difference values of population numbers in the table "Population statistic" and in the sections "Ethnicity" & "Religion" is caused by the use of various statistical methods.

=== Religion ===
Census 2021 (1+ %)
Religion	Number	Fraction
None	30	71.43%
Evangelical Church	10	23.81%
Roman Catholic Church	1	2.38%
Not found out	1	2.38%
Total	42	

In year 2021 was 42 people by religion 30 from None, 10 from Evangelical Church, 1 from Roman Catholic Church and 1 from Not found out.
