= Uhrovec =

- Municipality
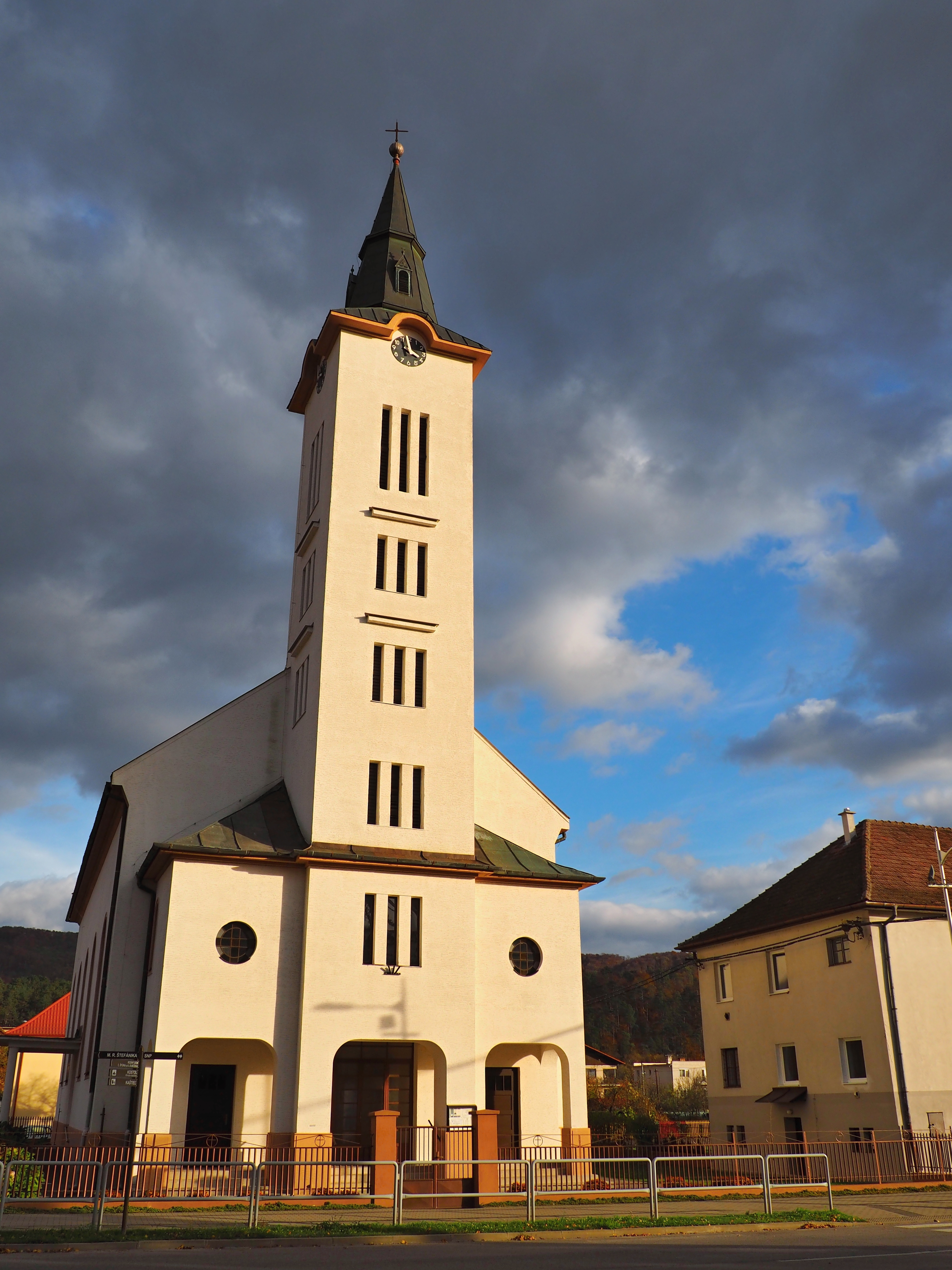
- Lutheran church

- Flag

- Location of Uhrovec in the Trenčín Region Location of Uhrovec in Slovakia
- Coordinates: 48.75°N 18.33°E
- Country: Slovakia
- Region: Trenčín Region
- District: Bánovce nad Bebravou District
- First mentioned: 1364

Area
  - Total: 22.94 km^{2} (8.86 sq mi)
- Elevation: 268 m (879 ft)

Population (2025)
  - Total: 1,505
- Time zone: UTC+1 (CET)
  - Summer (DST): UTC+2 (CEST)
- Postal code: 956 41
- Area code: +421 38
- Vehicle registration plate (until 2022): BN
- Website: www.uhrovec.sk

Uhrovec (Hungarian: Zayugróc) is a village and municipality in the Bánovce nad Bebravou District of the Trenčín Region of Slovakia.

== History ==
In historical records, the village was first mentioned in 1258.

== Geography ==
The municipality lies at an altitude of 268 metres (879 ft) and covers an area of 22.94 km^{2} (8.86 sq mi) (2025). It lies in the Strážovské vrchy mountains, in the Radiša river valley, around 8 km from Bánovce nad Bebravou and 30 km from Trenčín.

== Population ==
Population statistic (10 years)
Year	1995	2005	2015	2025
Count	1589	1458	1516	1505
Difference		−8.24%	+3.97%	−0.72%

Population statistic
Year	2024	2025
Count	1522	1505
Difference		−1.11%

It has a population of 1505 people (31 December 2025).

=== Ethnicity ===
Census 2021 (1+ %)
Ethnicity	Number	Fraction
Slovak	1491	97.51%
Not found out	25	1.63%
Czech	17	1.11%
Total	1529	

In year 2021 was 1529 people by ethnicity 1491 as Slovak, 25 as Not found out, 17 as Czech, 14 as Other, 4 as German, 4 as Hungarian, 3 as English, 2 as Irish, 2 as Italian, 2 as Romanian, 1 as Rusyn, 1 as Polish, 1 as Moravian and 1 as Croatian.

Note on population: The difference values of population numbers in the table "Population statistic" and in the sections "Ethnicity" & "Religion" is caused by the use of various statistical methods.

=== Religion ===
Census 2021 (1+ %)
Religion	Number	Fraction
Roman Catholic Church	555	36.3%
Evangelical Church	526	34.4%
None	382	24.98%
Not found out	29	1.9%
Total	1529	

In year 2021 was 1529 people by religion 555 from Roman Catholic Church, 526 from Evangelical Church, 382 from None, 29 from Not found out, 10 from Greek Catholic Church, 7 from Seventh-day Adventist Church, 5 from Other, 4 from Ad hoc movements, 3 from Eastern Orthodox Church, 3 from Other and not ascertained christian church, 2 from Baptists Church, 1 from Calvinist Church, 1 from Jehovah's Witnesses and 1 from Apostolic Church.

== Notable people ==
- Ľudovít Štúr, Slovak politician in the 19th century, leader of the Slovak national revival
- Alexander Dubček, Slovak politician in the second half of the 20th century

Both were born in the same house - building of local school.

- Karl Sovanka, painter and sculptor
- János Fadrusz, sculptor, started to learn in the sculptor-school in Uhrovec

== Twin towns — sister cities ==
Uhrovec is twinned with:

- Gilowice, Poland
- Kiskunfélegyháza, Hungary
- Modrá, Czech Republic
- Slavičín, Czech Republic
