= Mária Ďuríčková =

Slovak children's books writer (1919–2004)

- Born: Mária Piecková; 29 September 1919; Zvolenská Slatina, Czechoslovakia
- Died: 15 March 2004 (aged 84); Bratislava, Slovakia
- Other names: Mária Masaryková; M. Ď.; M. Ď. Janove
- Occupations: Writer, editor, translator, screenwriter
- Spouse: Vojtech Masaryk
- Children: 1
- Writing career
- Notable awards: Pribina Cross (3rd class, 2003)

Mária Ďuríčková (born Mária Piecková, married name Masaryková; 29 September 1919 – 15 March 2004) was a Slovak writer, editor, translator and screenwriter, best known for literature for children and young people. She wrote original fairy tales and school stories, collected and retold folk narratives (especially legends of Bratislava), and edited folklore anthologies. Her books have been translated into more than twenty languages.

== Early life ==
Ďuríčková was born on 29 September 1919 in the village of Zvolenská Slatina into a farming family. She grew up in a three-generation household; her grandmother told traditional stories and first interested her in folk narrative. She attended school in her birthplace and in the nearby city of Zvolen, and graduated from the teacher-training institute in Lučenec in 1938.

She taught in several Slovak villages, including Horný Tisovník, Žitná, Šajba, Omastiná and later in Bratislava. She married the teacher Vojtech Masaryk. He took part in the Slovak National Uprising, was captured, and was executed in December 1944 at Cibislávka near Bánovce nad Bebravou. Ďuríčková was left with an infant son, Ján. A subsequent lung illness forced her to leave teaching and to abandon part-time study of Slovak and Russian languages at the Comenius University.

== Editorial work ==
After the Second World War she joined the staff of children's magazines, becoming editor-in-chief of Družba (1951) and of Zornička (1952–53). From 1954 she was an editor of original children's books at the publishing house Mladé letá (previously SNDK). In 1969–70 (some sources give 1969–71) she was editor-in-chief of the revived children's literary monthly Slniečko. The magazine's line did not suit the incoming normalization authorities and she left the post; from 1971 she worked as a full-time writer.

== Writing ==
She published first in magazines such as Zornička and Ohník. Her first book was the verse tale Rozprávka o dedovi Mrázovi (1954). Early verse and folklore-based books were followed by prose that literary historians treat as part of a postwar “new wave” of Slovak children's writing, using a child's point of view and everyday speech.

Best-known titles include:

- Danka a Janka (1961), comic and everyday stories of twin sisters, later continued in Danka a Janka v rozprávke
- O Guľkovi Bombuľkovi (1962), a personification fairy tale
- Jasietka (1963), an original fairy tale in which a real child enters a folk-tale landscape — described by the Slovak Literary Centre as important in the development of the Slovak literary fairy tale
- Majka Tárajka (1965), a novella about a disabled village girl
- Stíhač na galuskách (1963), a novella of adolescence
- later folk-inspired collections Biela kňažná (1973), Dunajská kráľovná (1976) and Prešporský zvon (1978), the last two being Bratislava legends she treated as “emotional history” grounded in archival and oral research
- the folklore encyclopedia for children Zlatá brána (1975), which she compiled

She also wrote radio and television scripts. Adaptations include Štefan Uher's film My z IX. A (1961), from the story collection My z ôsmej A; the animated television series Danka a Janka; and films drawn from Majka Tárajka (A pobežím na kraj sveta) and Kľúče od mesta.

As a translator she worked mainly from Russian, but also from Czech and German (among them Bohatier Kremienok and Krása nevídaná).

== Awards ==
Selected honours include the Fraňo Kráľ Prize for children's literature (1968); the Premio Europeo di Letteratura per l'Infanzia “Pier Paolo Vergerio” (1978 and 1987); the IBBY Honour List for Dunajská kráľovná (1978) and for the translation Krása nevídaná (1980); a premium of the Ján Hollý Prize for translation (1977); the prize of the Union of Slovak Writers (1978); the Jozef Cíger Hronský Prize (1998); and the Pribina Cross, 3rd class (2003), awarded by the president of Slovakia Rudolf Schuster for services to Slovak children's literature.

== Death and legacy ==
Ďuríčková died in Bratislava on 15 March 2004, aged 84. Her birthplace keeps a memorial plaque and her family house. Two locomotives of the Košice Children's Heritage Railway are named Danka and Janka after characters from Mária Ďuríčková's emponymous 1961 book.

== Selected works ==
- Rozprávka o dedovi Mrázovi (1954)
- Čarovná píšťalka (1958)
- Zajtra bude pekne (1959)
- My z ôsmej A (1960)
- Danka a Janka (1961)
- O Guľkovi Bombuľkovi (1962)
- Jasietka (1963)
- Stíhač na galuskách (1963)
- Majka Tárajka (1965)
- Sestričky z Topánika (1969)
- Biela kňažná (1973)
- Zlatá brána (1975, editor)
- Dunajská kráľovná (1976)
- Prešporský zvon (1978)
- Kľúče od mesta (1981)
- Panenská veža na Devíne (1988)
- Zlatá priadka (1995)
