= Čierna Lehota =

Čierna Lehota may refer to several places in Slovakia.

- Čierna Lehota, Bánovce nad Bebravou District
- Čierna Lehota, Rožňava District
