= Ruskovce =

Ruskovce may refer to:

- Ruskovce, Bánovce nad Bebravou District, Slovakia
- Ruskovce, Sobrance District, Slovakia
