= Pravotice =

- Municipality
- Flag

- Location of Pravotice in the Trenčín Region Location of Pravotice in Slovakia
- Coordinates: 48.68°N 18.30°E
- Country: Slovakia
- Region: Trenčín Region
- District: Bánovce nad Bebravou District
- First mentioned: 1232

Area
  - Total: 6.04 km^{2} (2.33 sq mi)
- Elevation: 218 m (715 ft)

Population (2025)
  - Total: 373
- Time zone: UTC+1 (CET)
  - Summer (DST): UTC+2 (CEST)
- Postal code: 956 36
- Area code: +421 38
- Vehicle registration plate (until 2022): BN
- Website: www.obecpravotice.sk

Pravotice (Hungarian: Peres) is a village and municipality in Bánovce nad Bebravou District in the Trenčín Region of north-western Slovakia.

== History ==
In historical records the village was first mentioned in 1232.

== Geography ==
The municipality lies at an altitude of 218 metres (715 ft) and covers an area of 6.04 km^{2} (2.33 sq mi) (2025).

== Population ==
Population statistic (10 years)
Year	1995	2005	2015	2025
Count	339	277	306	373
Difference		−18.28%	+10.46%	+21.89%

Population statistic
Year	2024	2025
Count	369	373
Difference		+1.08%

It has a population of 373 people (31 December 2025).

=== Ethnicity ===
Census 2021 (1+ %)
Ethnicity	Number	Fraction
Slovak	339	98.83%
Not found out	5	1.45%
Total	343	

In year 2021 was 343 people by ethnicity 339 as Slovak, 5 as Not found out, 1 as Polish and 1 as Other.

Note on population: The difference values of population numbers in the table "Population statistic" and in the sections "Ethnicity" & "Religion" is caused by the use of various statistical methods.

=== Religion ===
Census 2021 (1+ %)
Religion	Number	Fraction
Roman Catholic Church	299	87.17%
None	29	8.45%
Evangelical Church	7	2.04%
Not found out	4	1.17%
Total	343	

In year 2021 was 343 people by religion 299 from Roman Catholic Church, 29 from None, 7 from Evangelical Church, 4 from Not found out, 2 from Christian Congregations in Slovakia and 2 from Greek Catholic Church.
