= Timoradza =

- Municipality
- Flag

- Location of Timoradza in the Trenčín Region Location of Timoradza in Slovakia
- Coordinates: 48.82°N 18.23°E
- Country: Slovakia
- Region: Trenčín Region
- District: Bánovce nad Bebravou District
- First mentioned: 1355

Area
  - Total: 10.48 km^{2} (4.05 sq mi)
- Elevation: 237 m (778 ft)

Population (2025)
  - Total: 487
- Time zone: UTC+1 (CET)
  - Summer (DST): UTC+2 (CEST)
- Postal code: 956 52
- Area code: +421 38
- Vehicle registration plate (until 2022): BN
- Website: www.timoradza.sk

Timoradza (Hungarian: Timoháza) is a village and municipality in Bánovce nad Bebravou District in the Trenčín Region of north-western Slovakia.

== History ==
In historical records the village was first mentioned in 1355.

== Geography ==
The municipality lies at an altitude of 237 metres (778 ft) and covers an area of 10.48 km^{2} (4.05 sq mi) (2025).

== Population ==
Population statistic (10 years)
Year	1995	2005	2015	2025
Count	503	499	540	487
Difference		−0.79%	+8.21%	−9.81%

Population statistic
Year	2024	2025
Count	481	487
Difference		+1.24%

It has a population of 487 people (31 December 2025).

=== Ethnicity ===
Census 2021 (1+ %)
Ethnicity	Number	Fraction
Slovak	498	98.8%
Total	504	

In year 2021 was 504 people by ethnicity 498 as Slovak, 4 as Czech, 3 as Russian, 2 as Not found out, 2 as Other, 1 as Ukrainian and 1 as Polish.

Note on population: The difference values of population numbers in the table "Population statistic" and in the sections "Ethnicity" & "Religion" is caused by the use of various statistical methods.

=== Religion ===
Census 2021 (1+ %)
Religion	Number	Fraction
Roman Catholic Church	220	43.65%
Evangelical Church	218	43.25%
None	49	9.72%
Total	504	

In year 2021 was 504 people by religion 220 from Roman Catholic Church, 218 from Evangelical Church, 49 from None, 4 from Christian Congregations in Slovakia, 4 from Greek Catholic Church, 3 from Paganism and natural spirituality, 3 from Not found out, 2 from Other and not ascertained christian church and 1 from Other.
