= Miezgovce =

- Municipality
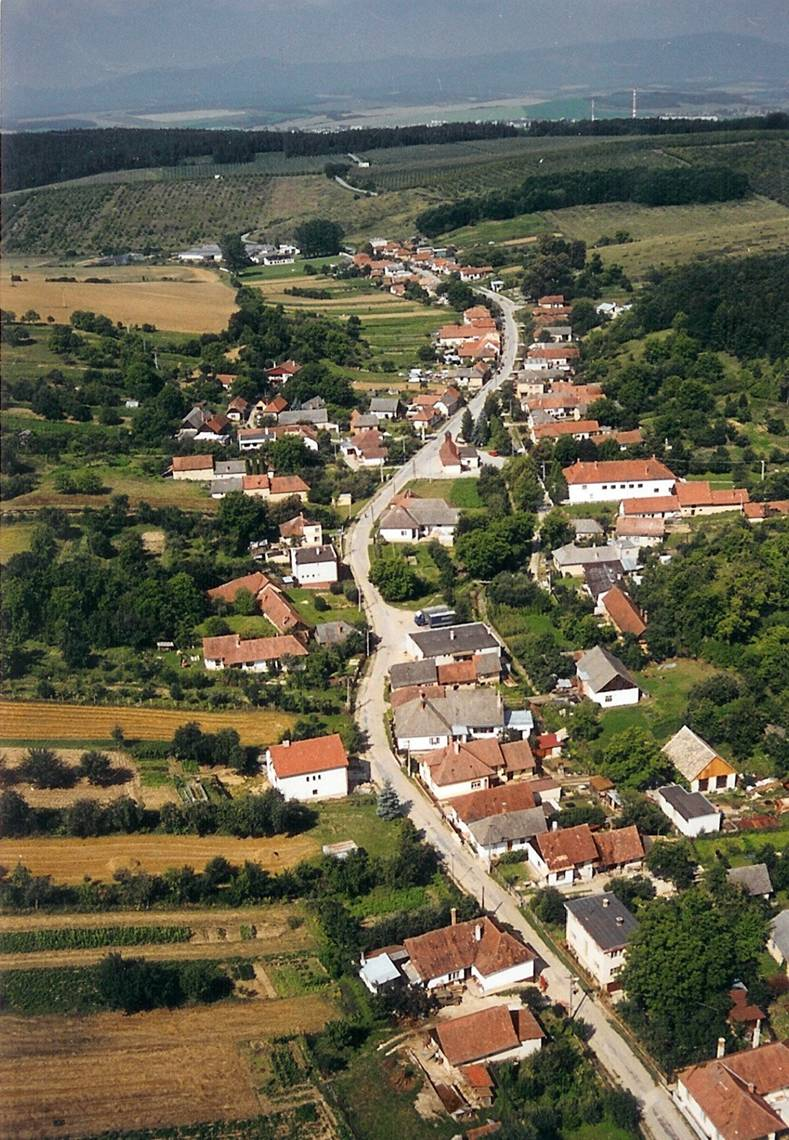

- Flag

- Location of Miezgovce in the Trenčín Region Location of Miezgovce in Slovakia
- Coordinates: 48.72°N 18.32°E
- Country: Slovakia
- Region: Trenčín Region
- District: Bánovce nad Bebravou District
- First mentioned: 1389

Area
  - Total: 8.75 km^{2} (3.38 sq mi)
- Elevation: 244 m (801 ft)

Population (2025)
  - Total: 303
- Time zone: UTC+1 (CET)
  - Summer (DST): UTC+2 (CEST)
- Postal code: 957 01
- Area code: +421 38
- Vehicle registration plate (until 2022): BN
- Website: www.miezgovce.sk

Miezgovce (Hungarian: Mézgás) is a village and municipality in Bánovce nad Bebravou District in the Trenčín Region of north-western Slovakia.

== History ==
In historical records the village was first mentioned in 1389. The Bánovská parenica (the most famous cycling race in region) is regularly organized every year on the 6 September and it goes through this village. The competition is available for a high range of cyclists. It starts in the town Bánovce nad Bebravou.

== Geography ==
The municipality lies at an altitude of 244 metres (801 ft) and covers an area of 8.75 km^{2} (3.38 sq mi) (2025).

== Population ==
Population statistic (10 years)
Year	1995	2005	2015	2025
Count	241	250	277	303
Difference		+3.73%	+10.8%	+9.38%

Population statistic
Year	2024	2025
Count	298	303
Difference		+1.67%

It has a population of 303 people (31 December 2025).

=== Ethnicity ===
Census 2021 (1+ %)
Ethnicity	Number	Fraction
Slovak	282	99.64%
Czech	6	2.12%
Total	283	

In year 2021 was 283 people by ethnicity 282 as Slovak, 6 as Czech and 1 as Not found out.

Note on population: The difference values of population numbers in the table "Population statistic" and in the sections "Ethnicity" & "Religion" is caused by the use of various statistical methods.

=== Religion ===
Census 2021 (1+ %)
Religion	Number	Fraction
Roman Catholic Church	166	58.66%
None	64	22.61%
Evangelical Church	46	16.25%
Greek Catholic Church	5	1.77%
Total	283	

In year 2021 was 283 people by religion 166 from Roman Catholic Church, 64 from None, 46 from Evangelical Church, 5 from Greek Catholic Church, 1 from Church of the Brethren and 1 from Buddhism.
