= Šišov =

- Municipality
- Flag

- Location of Šišov in the Trenčín Region Location of Šišov in Slovakia
- Coordinates: 48.65°N 18.18°E
- Country: Slovakia
- Region: Trenčín Region
- District: Bánovce nad Bebravou District
- First mentioned: 1113

Area
  - Total: 9.63 km^{2} (3.72 sq mi)
- Elevation: 216 m (709 ft)

Population (2025)
  - Total: 496
- Time zone: UTC+1 (CET)
  - Summer (DST): UTC+2 (CEST)
- Postal code: 956 38
- Area code: +421 38
- Vehicle registration plate (until 2022): BN
- Website: www.sisov.sk

Šišov (Hungarian: Sissó) is a village and municipality in Bánovce nad Bebravou District in the Trenčín Region of north-western Slovakia.

== History ==
In historical records the village was first mentioned in 1113.

== Geography ==
The municipality lies at an altitude of 216 metres (709 ft) and covers an area of 9.63 km^{2} (3.72 sq mi) (2025).

== Population ==
Population statistic (10 years)
Year	1995	2005	2015	2025
Count	497	495	495	496
Difference		−0.40%	+0%	+0.20%

Population statistic
Year	2024	2025
Count	493	496
Difference		+0.60%

It has a population of 496 people (31 December 2025).

=== Ethnicity ===
Census 2021 (1+ %)
Ethnicity	Number	Fraction
Slovak	498	97.64%
Not found out	11	2.15%
Total	510	

In year 2021 was 510 people by ethnicity 498 as Slovak, 11 as Not found out, 1 as Czech and 1 as Romani.

Note on population: The difference values of population numbers in the table "Population statistic" and in the sections "Ethnicity" & "Religion" is caused by the use of various statistical methods.

=== Religion ===
Census 2021 (1+ %)
Religion	Number	Fraction
Roman Catholic Church	419	82.16%
None	60	11.76%
Not found out	11	2.16%
Christian Congregations in Slovakia	6	1.18%
Evangelical Church	6	1.18%
Total	510	

In year 2021 was 510 people by religion 419 from Roman Catholic Church, 60 from None, 11 from Not found out, 6 from Christian Congregations in Slovakia, 6 from Evangelical Church, 4 from Other and not ascertained christian church, 2 from Greek Catholic Church, 1 from Buddhism and 1 from Ad hoc movements.
