= Uhrovské Podhradie =

- Municipality
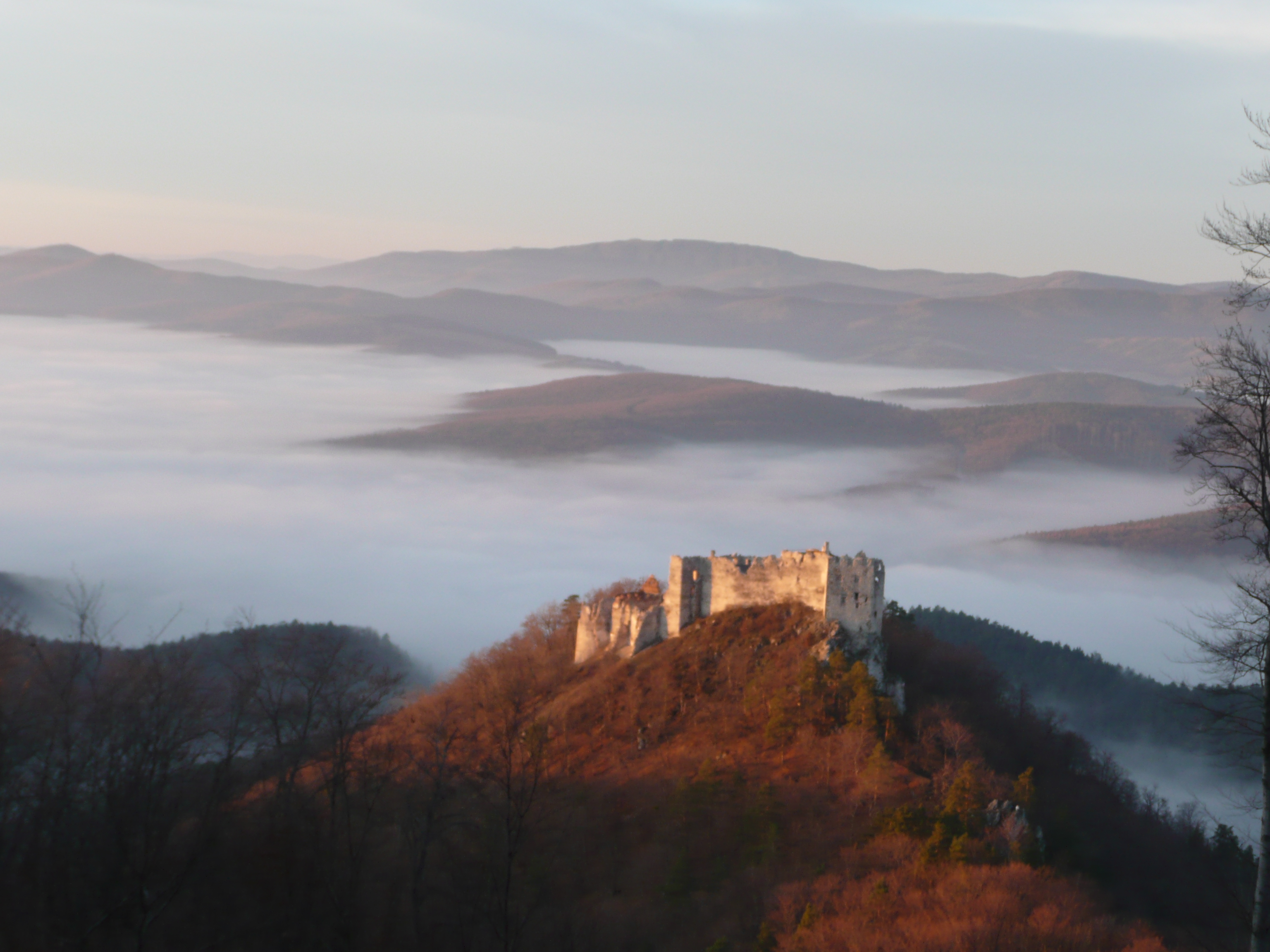
- Uhrovec Castle

- Flag

- Location of Uhrovské Podhradie in the Trenčín Region Location of Uhrovské Podhradie in Slovakia
- Coordinates: 48.77°N 18.38°E
- Country: Slovakia
- Region: Trenčín Region
- District: Bánovce nad Bebravou District
- First mentioned: 1481

Area
  - Total: 12.52 km^{2} (4.83 sq mi)
- Elevation: 327 m (1,073 ft)

Population (2025)
  - Total: 46
- Time zone: UTC+1 (CET)
  - Summer (DST): UTC+2 (CEST)
- Postal code: 956 42
- Area code: +421 38
- Vehicle registration plate (until 2022): BN

Uhrovské Podhradie (Hungarian: Zayváralja) is a village and municipality in Bánovce nad Bebravou District in the Trenčín Region of north-western Slovakia. The village is situated close to the ruins of a Roman castle Uhrovec.

== History ==
In historical records the village was first mentioned in 1481.

== Geography ==
The municipality lies at an altitude of 327 metres (1,073 ft) and covers an area of 12.52 km^{2} (4.83 sq mi) (2025).

== Population ==
Population statistic (10 years)
Year	1995	2005	2015	2025
Count	63	44	38	46
Difference		−30.15%	−13.63%	+21.05%

Population statistic
Year	2024	2025
Count	43	46
Difference		+6.97%

It has a population of 46 people (31 December 2025).

=== Ethnicity ===
Census 2021 (1+ %)
Ethnicity	Number	Fraction
Slovak	36	92.3%
Czech	1	2.56%
Not found out	1	2.56%
Other	1	2.56%
Total	39	

In year 2021 was 39 people by ethnicity 36 as Slovak, 1 as Czech, 1 as Not found out and 1 as Other.

Note on population: The difference values of population numbers in the table "Population statistic" and in the sections "Ethnicity" & "Religion" is caused by the use of various statistical methods.

=== Religion ===
Census 2021 (1+ %)
Religion	Number	Fraction
Evangelical Church	16	41.03%
Roman Catholic Church	14	35.9%
None	7	17.95%
Not found out	1	2.56%
Buddhism	1	2.56%
Total	39	

In year 2021 was 39 people by religion 16 from Evangelical Church, 14 from Roman Catholic Church, 7 from None, 1 from Not found out and 1 from Buddhism.
