= Pochabany =

- Municipality
- Flag

- Location of Pochabany in the Trenčín Region Location of Pochabany in Slovakia
- Coordinates: 48.68°N 18.15°E
- Country: Slovakia
- Region: Trenčín Region
- District: Bánovce nad Bebravou District
- First mentioned: 1329

Area
  - Total: 4.31 km^{2} (1.66 sq mi)
- Elevation: 256 m (840 ft)

Population (2025)
  - Total: 275
- Time zone: UTC+1 (CET)
  - Summer (DST): UTC+2 (CEST)
- Postal code: 956 40
- Area code: +421 38
- Vehicle registration plate (until 2022): BN
- Website: www.obecpochabany.sk

Pochabany (Hungarian: Pohába) is a village and municipality in the Bánovce nad Bebravou District of the Trenčín Region of Slovakia.

== Geography ==
The municipality lies at an altitude of 256 metres (840 ft) and covers an area of 4.31 km^{2} (1.66 sq mi) (2025).

== Population ==
Population statistic (10 years)
Year	1995	2005	2015	2025
Count	283	246	250	275
Difference		−13.07%	+1.62%	+10%

Population statistic
Year	2024	2025
Count	275	275
Difference		+0%

It has a population of 275 people (31 December 2025).

=== Ethnicity ===
Census 2021 (1+ %)
Ethnicity	Number	Fraction
Slovak	252	97.67%
Not found out	7	2.71%
Total	258	

In year 2021 was 258 people by ethnicity 252 as Slovak, 7 as Not found out, 2 as Czech, 1 as Vietnamese, 1 as German and 1 as Hungarian.

Note on population: The difference values of population numbers in the table "Population statistic" and in the sections "Ethnicity" & "Religion" is caused by the use of various statistical methods.

=== Religion ===
Census 2021 (1+ %)
Religion	Number	Fraction
Roman Catholic Church	208	80.62%
None	37	14.34%
Evangelical Church	7	2.71%
Not found out	3	1.16%
Total	258	

In year 2021 was 258 people by religion 208 from Roman Catholic Church, 37 from None, 7 from Evangelical Church, 3 from Not found out, 1 from Calvinist Church, 1 from Eastern Orthodox Church and 1 from Christian Congregations in Slovakia.
