= Borčany =

- Municipality
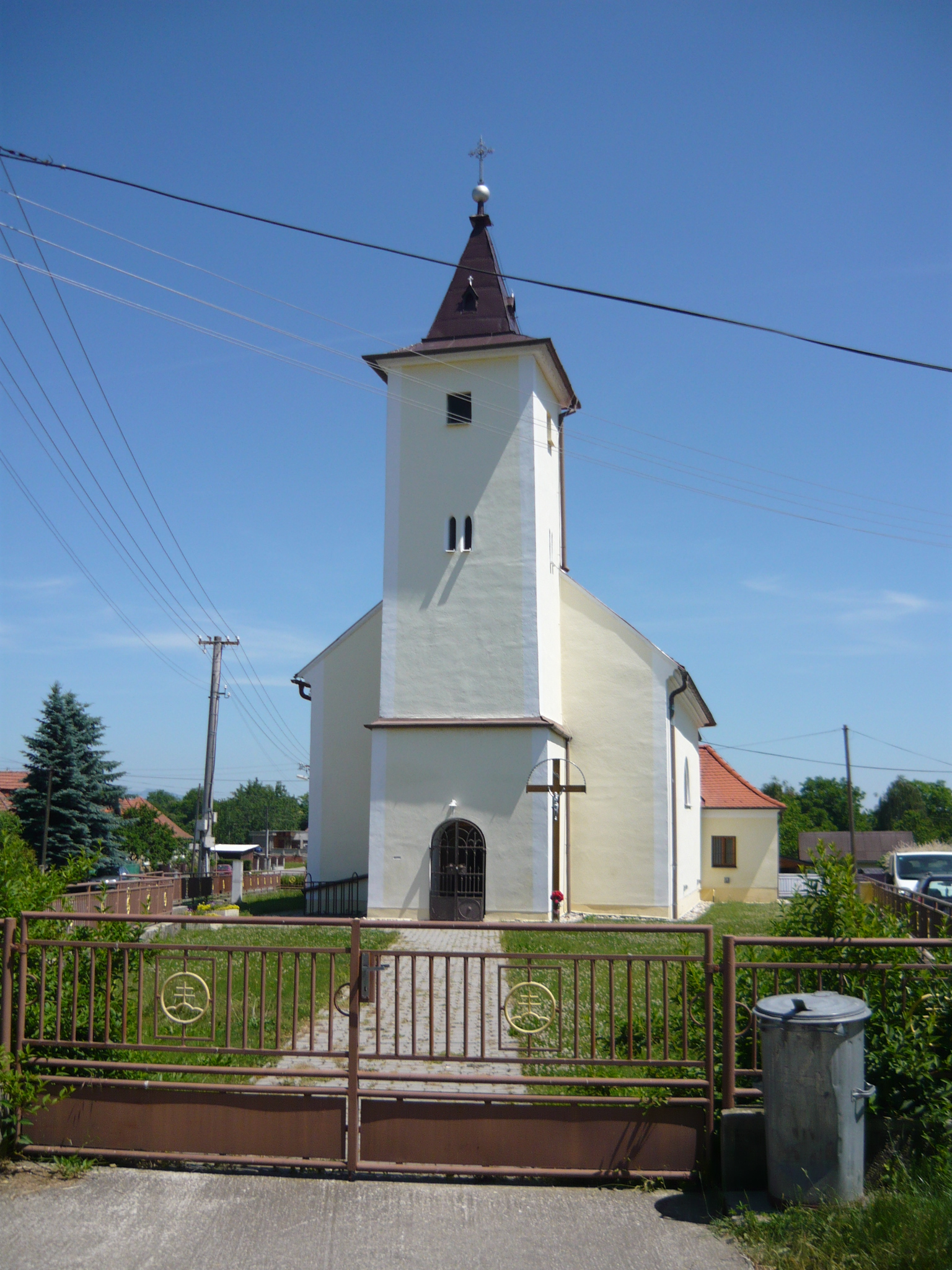
- Church of Saint Gallus

- Flag

- Location of Borčany in the Trenčín Region Location of Borčany in Slovakia
- Coordinates: 48.67°N 18.22°E
- Country: Slovakia
- Region: Trenčín Region
- District: Bánovce nad Bebravou District
- First mentioned: 1113

Area
  - Total: 3.10 km^{2} (1.20 sq mi)
- Elevation: 197 m (646 ft)

Population (2025)
  - Total: 260
- Time zone: UTC+1 (CET)
  - Summer (DST): UTC+2 (CEST)
- Postal code: 956 36
- Area code: +421 38
- Vehicle registration plate (until 2022): BN
- Website: www.borcany.sk

Borčany (Hungarian: Borcsány) is a village and municipality in Bánovce nad Bebravou District in the Trenčín Region of north-western Slovakia.

== History ==
In historical records the village was first mentioned in 1113.

== Geography ==
The municipality lies at an altitude of 197 metres (646 ft) and covers an area of 3.10 km^{2} (1.20 sq mi) (2025).

== Population ==
Population statistic (10 years)
Year	1995	2005	2015	2025
Count	261	255	257	260
Difference		−2.29%	+0.78%	+1.16%

Population statistic
Year	2024	2025
Count	265	260
Difference		−1.88%

It has a population of 260 people (31 December 2025).

=== Ethnicity ===
Census 2021 (1+ %)
Ethnicity	Number	Fraction
Slovak	260	98.85%
Total	263	

In year 2021 was 263 people by ethnicity 260 as Slovak, 2 as Not found out, 1 as Czech, 1 as Serbian, 1 as Romani, 1 as Romanian and 1 as Other.

Note on population: The difference values of population numbers in the table "Population statistic" and in the sections "Ethnicity" & "Religion" is caused by the use of various statistical methods.

=== Religion ===
Census 2021 (1+ %)
Religion	Number	Fraction
Roman Catholic Church	231	87.83%
None	25	9.51%
Evangelical Church	5	1.9%
Total	263	

In year 2021 was 263 people by religion 231 from Roman Catholic Church, 25 from None, 5 from Evangelical Church, 1 from Eastern Orthodox Church and 1 from Islam.

== Genealogical resources ==
The records for genealogical research are available at the state archive "Statny

Archiv in Nitra, Slovakia"

== See also ==
- List of municipalities and towns in Slovakia
