= Bánovce nad Bebravou District =

Coordinates: 48°39′9″N 18°15′33″E

- District
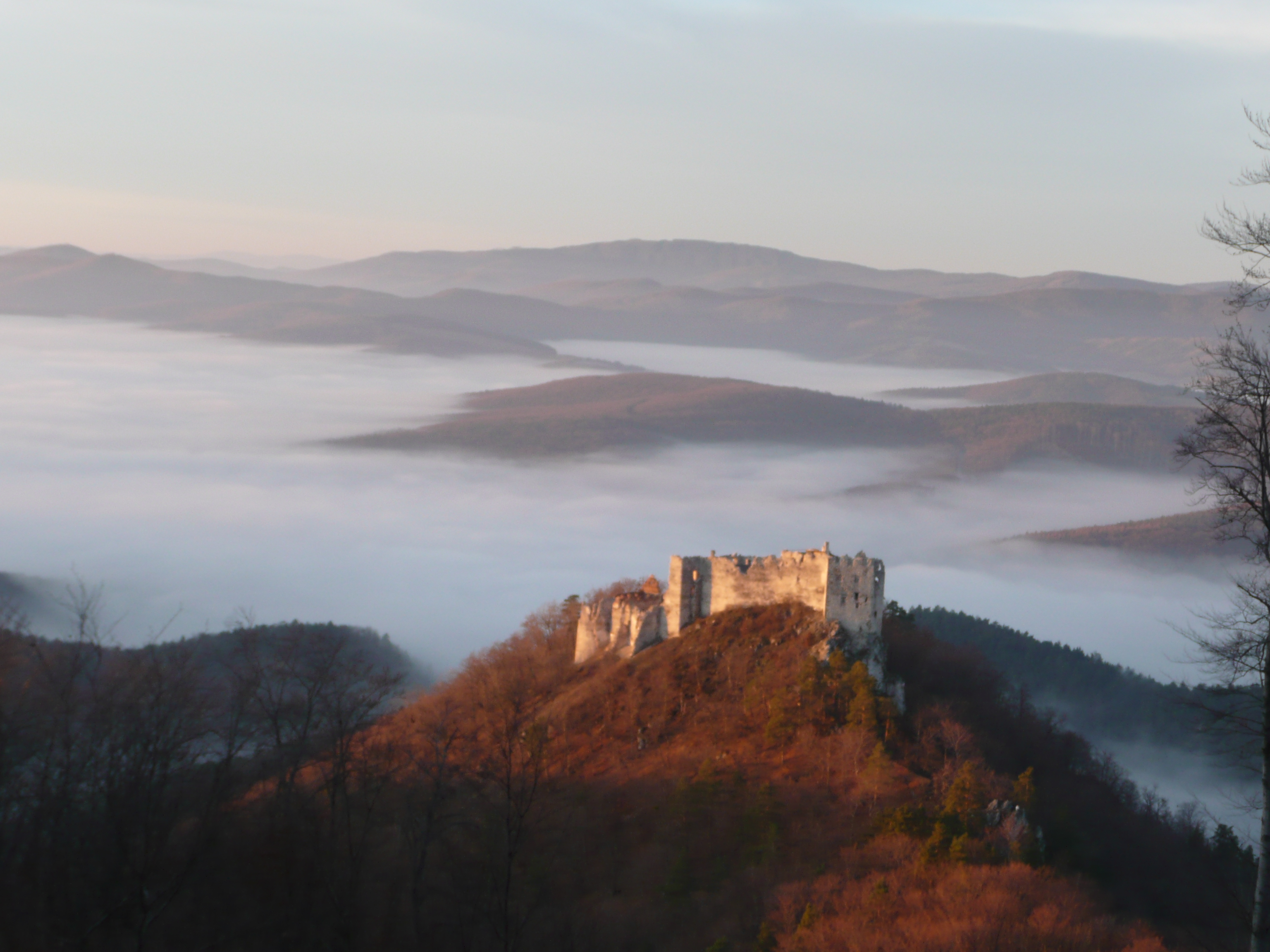
- Country: Slovakia
- Region (kraj): Trenčín Region
- Seat: Bánovce nad Bebravou

Area
  - Total: 461.94 km^{2} (178.36 sq mi)

Population (2025)
  - Total: 34,714
- Time zone: UTC+1 (CET)
  - Summer (DST): UTC+2 (CEST)
- Telephone prefix: 038
- Vehicle registration plate (until 2022): BN
- Municipalities: 43

Bánovce nad Bebravou District (Slovak: okres Bánovce nad Bebravou, Hungarian: Báni járás) is a district in the Trenčín Region of western Slovakia. Until 1918, the district was mostly part of the county of Kingdom of Hungary of Trencsén, except for a small area in the south which formed part of the county of Nyitra.

== Population ==
Population statistic (10 years)
Year	1995	2005	2015	2025
Count	38,725	38,190	36,742	34,714
Difference		−1.38%	−3.79%	−5.51%

Population statistic
Year	2024	2025
Count	34,910	34,714
Difference		−0.56%

It has a population of 34,714 people (31 December 2025).

Historical population
Year	Pop.	±%
1970	33,642	—
1980	37,017	+10.0%
1991	38,474	+3.9%
2001	38,640	+0.4%
2011	37,128	−3.9%
2021	35,967	−3.1%
Source: Statistical Office of the Slovak Republic

=== Ethnicity ===
Census 2021 (1+ %)
Ethnicity	Number	Fraction
Slovak	34,006	93.03%
Not found out	1783	4.87%
Total	36,552	

In year 2021 was 36,552 people by ethnicity 34,006 as Slovak, 1783 as Not found out, 258 as Czech, 102 as Other, 90 as Romani, 45 as Hungarian, 42 as Russian, 35 as Ukrainian, 29 as Rusyn, 19 as German, 17 as Serbian, 16 as Romanian, 15 as English, 14 as Vietnamese, 13 as Italian, 11 as Polish, 10 as Moravian, 8 as Austrian, 7 as Turkish, 7 as Canadian, 6 as Jewish, 5 as Chinese, 4 as Croatian, 3 as Albanian, 2 as Irish, 2 as Greek, 2 as Bulgarian and 1 as Silesian.

Note on population: The difference values of population numbers in the table "Population statistic" and in the sections "Ethnicity" & "Religion" is caused by the use of various statistical methods.

=== Religion ===
Census 2021 (1+ %)
Religion	Number	Fraction
Roman Catholic Church	22,610	62.86%
None	6627	18.43%
Evangelical Church	4230	11.76%
Not found out	1722	4.79%
Total	35,967	

In year 2021 was 35,967 people by religion 22,610 from Roman Catholic Church, 6627 from None, 4230 from Evangelical Church, 1722 from Not found out, 176 from Greek Catholic Church, 100 from Ad hoc movements, 75 from Other, 73 from Christian Congregations in Slovakia, 55 from Apostolic Church, 53 from Other and not ascertained christian church, 50 from Eastern Orthodox Church, 45 from Seventh-day Adventist Church, 29 from Buddhism, 22 from Paganism and natural spirituality, 20 from Jehovah's Witnesses, 19 from Islam, 16 from Calvinist Church, 14 from United Methodist Church, 10 from Old Catholic Church, 8 from Baptists Church, 6 from Hinduism, 2 from Jewish community, 2 from Church of Jesus Christ of Latter-day Saints, 1 from Czechoslovak Hussite Church, 1 from Church of the Brethren and 1 from Bahá'i Community.

== Municipalities ==
The district has 42 municipalities.

Municipality	Area [km^{2}]	Population
Bánovce nad Bebravou	26.45	15,872
Borčany	3.10	260
Brezolupy	6.33	517
Cimenná	3.60	102
Čierna Lehota	15.27	110
Dežerice	13.03	1,145
Dolné Naštice	4.63	612
Dubnička	8.10	129
Dvorec	2.65	527
Haláčovce	4.69	351
Horné Naštice	8.56	530
Chudá Lehota	3.66	224
Krásna Ves	10.21	479
Kšinná	41.24	462
Libichava	2.62	139
Ľutov	8.57	177
Malá Hradná	7.90	409
Malé Hoste	6.80	404
Miezgovce	8.75	303
Nedašovce	6.91	419
Omastiná	12.44	45
Otrhánky	4.64	405
Pečeňany	6.62	558
Podlužany	14.02	954
Pochabany	4.31	275
Pravotice	6.04	373
Prusy	7.51	669
Ruskovce	3.35	511
Rybany	11.04	1,490
Slatina nad Bebravou	11.53	456
Slatinka nad Bebravou	9.53	199
Šípkov	11.55	146
Šišov	9.63	496
Timoradza	10.48	487
Trebichava	11.76	34
Uhrovec	22.94	1,505
Uhrovské Podhradie	12.52	46
Veľké Držkovce	12.78	630
Veľké Hoste	8.26	522
Veľké Chlievany	5.14	494
Vysočany	4.32	120
Zlatníky	50.43	689
Žitná-Radiša	17.76	439

Population and area values are current for year 2025.

== Population ==
Historical population
Year	Pop.	±%
1970	33,642	—
1980	37,017	+10.0%
1991	38,474	+3.9%
2001	38,640	+0.4%
2011	37,128	−3.9%
2021	35,967	−3.1%
Source: Censuses
