= Zvolenská Slatina =

Zvolenská Slatina Nagyszalatna
- Municipality
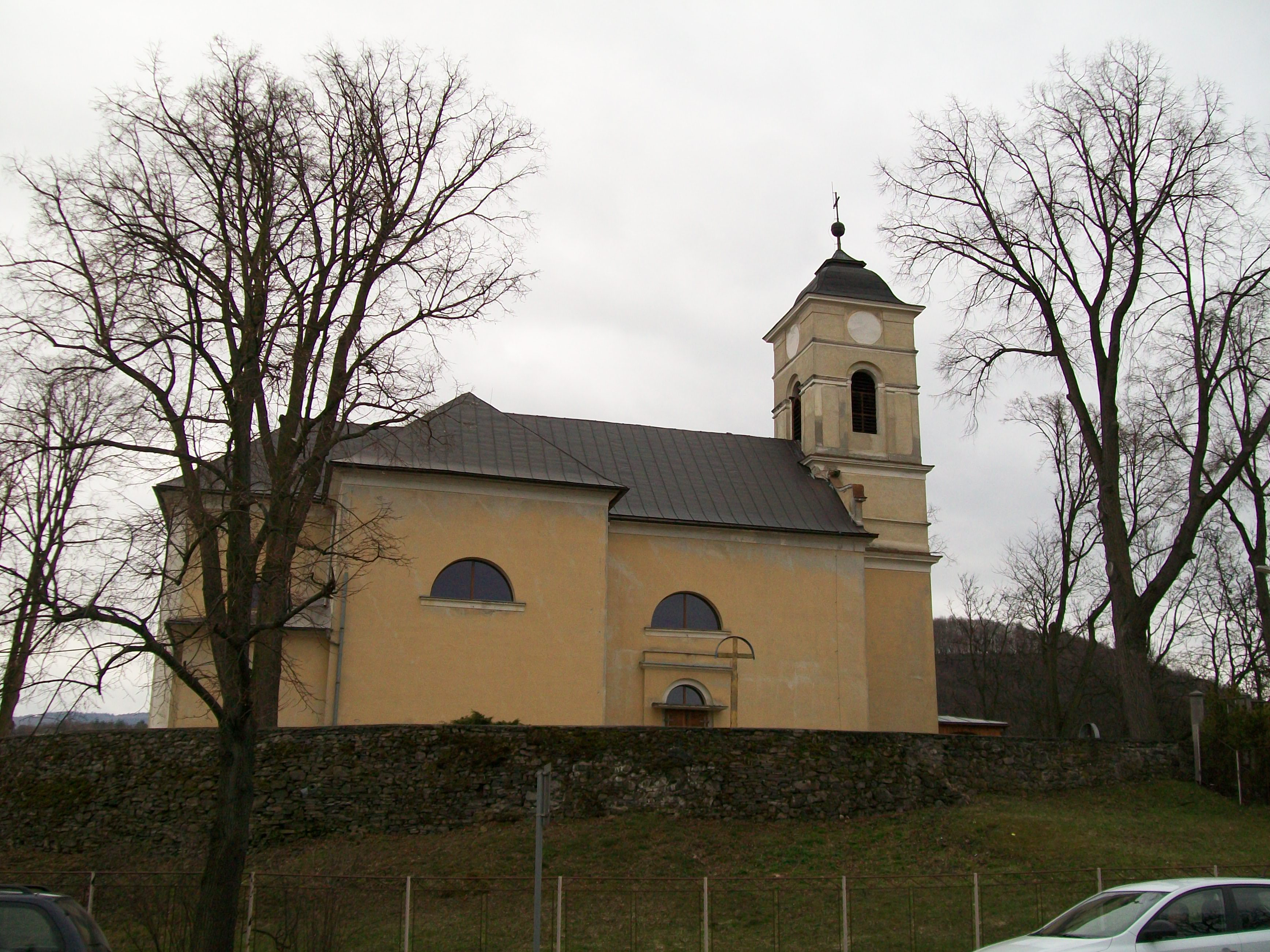
- Roman Catholic church in Zvolenská Slatina

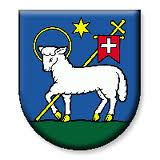
- Flag Coat of arms

- Location of Zvolenská Slatina in the Banská Bystrica Region Location of Zvolenská Slatina in Slovakia
- Coordinates: 48.57°N 19.27°E
- Country: Slovakia
- Region: Banská Bystrica Region
- District: Zvolen District
- First mentioned: 1332

Area
  - Total: 45.93 km^{2} (17.73 sq mi)
- Elevation: 328 m (1,076 ft)

Population (2025)
  - Total: 2,788
- Time zone: UTC+1 (CET)
  - Summer (DST): UTC+2 (CEST)
- Postal code: 962 01
- Area code: +421 45
- Vehicle registration plate (until 2022): ZV
- Website: www.zvolenskaslatina.sk

Zvolenská Slatina (German: Großslatina; Hungarian: Nagyszalatna) is a village and municipality of the Zvolen District in the Banská Bystrica Region of central Slovakia.

== History ==
In historical records the village was first mentioned in 1263.

== Geography ==
The municipality lies at an altitude of 328 metres (1,076 ft) and covers an area of 45.93 km^{2} (17.73 sq mi) (2025).

== Population ==
Population statistic (10 years)
Year	1995	2005	2015	2025
Count	2521	2701	2817	2788
Difference		+7.14%	+4.29%	−1.02%

Population statistic
Year	2024	2025
Count	2795	2788
Difference		−0.25%

It has a population of 2788 people (31 December 2025).

=== Ethnicity ===
Census 2021 (1+ %)
Ethnicity	Number	Fraction
Slovak	2630	93.86%
Not found out	152	5.42%
Romani	80	2.85%
Total	2802	

In year 2021 was 2802 people by ethnicity 2630 as Slovak, 152 as Not found out, 80 as Romani, 15 as Czech, 4 as Polish, 4 as Hungarian, 3 as Russian, 3 as Other, 2 as German, 1 as Ukrainian, 1 as Italian, 1 as Rusyn, 1 as Austrian, 1 as Moravian, 1 as French and 1 as English.

Note on population: The difference values of population numbers in the table "Population statistic" and in the sections "Ethnicity" & "Religion" is caused by the use of various statistical methods.

=== Religion ===
Census 2021 (1+ %)
Religion	Number	Fraction
Roman Catholic Church	1206	43.04%
None	736	26.27%
Evangelical Church	645	23.02%
Not found out	151	5.39%
Total	2802	

In year 2021 was 2802 people by religion 1206 from Roman Catholic Church, 736 from None, 645 from Evangelical Church, 151 from Not found out, 23 from Greek Catholic Church, 13 from Ad hoc movements, 8 from Christian Congregations in Slovakia, 5 from Other and not ascertained christian church, 5 from Other, 2 from Calvinist Church, 2 from Eastern Orthodox Church, 2 from United Methodist Church, 1 from Islam, 1 from Hinduism, 1 from Buddhism and 1 from Baptists Church.

== Notable people ==
- Ján Bahýľ (1856 – 1916), inventor
- Mária Ďuríčková (1919–2004), writer
- Terézia Vansová (1857–1942), writer
- Roland Grapow (born 1959), German metal musician, lives in Zvolenská Slatina
