= Malá Hradná =

- Municipality
- Flag

- Location of Malá Hradná in the Trenčín Region Location of Malá Hradná in Slovakia
- Coordinates: 48.77°N 18.17°E
- Country: Slovakia
- Region: Trenčín Region
- District: Bánovce nad Bebravou District
- First mentioned: 1329

Area
  - Total: 7.90 km^{2} (3.05 sq mi)
- Elevation: 246 m (807 ft)

Population (2025)
  - Total: 409
- Time zone: UTC+1 (CET)
  - Summer (DST): UTC+2 (CEST)
- Postal code: 956 54
- Area code: +421 38
- Vehicle registration plate (until 2022): BN
- Website: www.malahradna.dcom.sk

Malá Hradná (Hungarian: Kisradna) is a village and municipality in Bánovce nad Bebravou District in the Trenčín Region of north-western Slovakia.

== History ==
In historical records the village was first mentioned in 1329.

== Geography ==
The municipality lies at an altitude of 246 metres (807 ft) and covers an area of 7.90 km^{2} (3.05 sq mi) (2025).

== Population ==
Population statistic (10 years)
Year	1995	2005	2015	2025
Count	409	382	369	409
Difference		−6.60%	−3.40%	+10.84%

Population statistic
Year	2024	2025
Count	407	409
Difference		+0.49%

It has a population of 409 people (31 December 2025).

=== Ethnicity ===
Census 2021 (1+ %)
Ethnicity	Number	Fraction
Slovak	407	99.02%
Not found out	5	1.21%
Total	411	

In year 2021 was 411 people by ethnicity 407 as Slovak, 5 as Not found out, 1 as Rusyn and 1 as English.

Note on population: The difference values of population numbers in the table "Population statistic" and in the sections "Ethnicity" & "Religion" is caused by the use of various statistical methods.

=== Religion ===
Census 2021 (1+ %)
Religion	Number	Fraction
Roman Catholic Church	342	83.21%
None	37	9%
Evangelical Church	21	5.11%
Total	411	

In year 2021 was 411 people by religion 342 from Roman Catholic Church, 37 from None, 21 from Evangelical Church, 4 from Not found out, 4 from Ad hoc movements and 3 from Calvinist Church.
