= Cimenná =

- Municipality
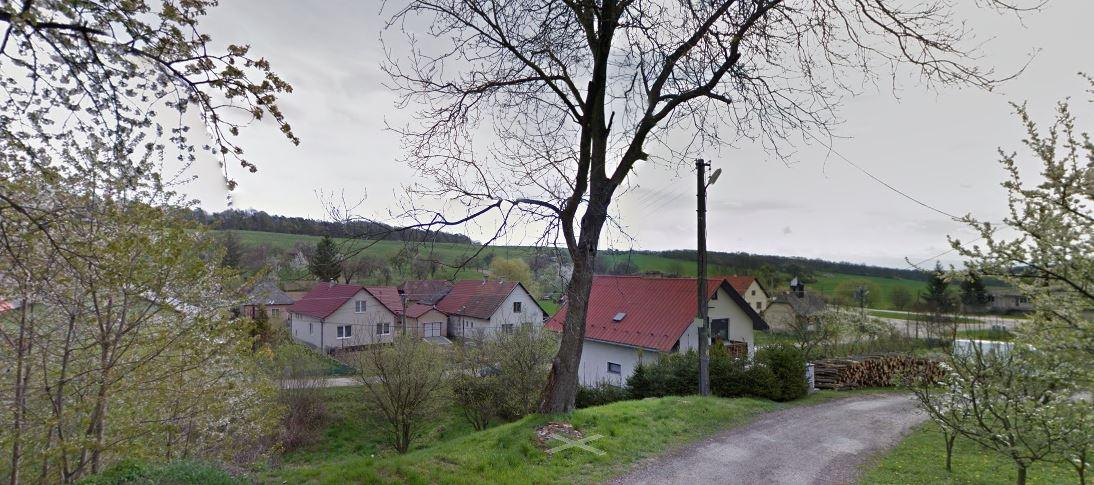

- Flag

- Location of Cimenná in the Trenčín Region Location of Cimenná in Slovakia
- Coordinates: 48.73°N 18.15°E
- Country: Slovakia
- Region: Trenčín Region
- District: Bánovce nad Bebravou District
- First mentioned: 1484

Area
  - Total: 3.60 km^{2} (1.39 sq mi)
- Elevation: 271 m (889 ft)

Population (2025)
  - Total: 102
- Time zone: UTC+1 (CET)
  - Summer (DST): UTC+2 (CEST)
- Postal code: 956 37
- Area code: +421 38
- Vehicle registration plate (until 2022): BN
- Website: www.cimenna.sk

Cimenná (Hungarian: Újvíz) is a village and municipality in Bánovce nad Bebravou District in the Trenčín Region of north-western Slovakia.

== History ==
In historical records the village was first mentioned in 1484.

== Geography ==
The municipality lies at an altitude of 271 metres (889 ft) and covers an area of 3.60 km^{2} (1.39 sq mi) (2025).

== Population ==
Population statistic (10 years)
Year	1995	2005	2015	2025
Count	85	81	96	102
Difference		−4.70%	+18.51%	+6.25%

Population statistic
Year	2024	2025
Count	100	102
Difference		+2%

It has a population of 102 people (31 December 2025).

=== Ethnicity ===
Census 2021 (1+ %)
Ethnicity	Number	Fraction
Slovak	100	99%
Not found out	4	3.96%
Total	101	

In year 2021 was 101 people by ethnicity 100 as Slovak, 4 as Not found out and 1 as Czech.

Note on population: The difference values of population numbers in the table "Population statistic" and in the sections "Ethnicity" & "Religion" is caused by the use of various statistical methods.

=== Religion ===
Census 2021 (1+ %)
Religion	Number	Fraction
Roman Catholic Church	87	86.14%
None	13	12.87%
Total	101	

In year 2021 was 101 people by religion 87 from Roman Catholic Church, 13 from None and 1 from Not found out.

== Genealogical resources ==
The records for genealogical research are available at the state archive "Statny Archiv in Bratislava, Nitra, Slovakia"

- Roman Catholic church records (births/marriages/deaths): 1782-1896 (parish B)

== See also ==
- List of municipalities and towns in Slovakia
