= Zlatníky =

- Municipality
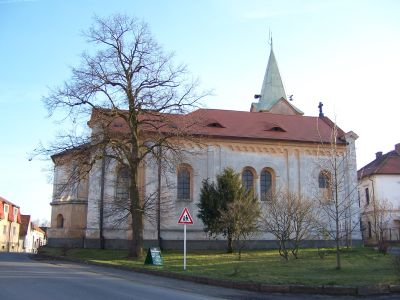

- Flag

- Location of Zlatníky in the Trenčín Region Location of Zlatníky in Slovakia
- Coordinates: 48.72°N 18.13°E
- Country: Slovakia
- Region: Trenčín Region
- District: Bánovce nad Bebravou District
- First mentioned: 1199

Area
  - Total: 50.43 km^{2} (19.47 sq mi)
- Elevation: 265 m (869 ft)

Population (2025)
  - Total: 689
- Time zone: UTC+1 (CET)
  - Summer (DST): UTC+2 (CEST)
- Postal code: 956 37
- Area code: +421 38
- Vehicle registration plate (until 2022): BN
- Website: www.zlatniky.sk

Zlatníky (Hungarian: Aranyosd) is a village and municipality in Bánovce nad Bebravou District in the Trenčín Region of north-western Slovakia.

== History ==
In historical records the village was first mentioned in 1199; 827 years ago.

== Geography ==
The municipality lies at an altitude of 265 metres (869 ft) and covers an area of 50.43 km^{2} (19.47 sq mi) (2025).

== Population ==
Population statistic (10 years)
Year	1995	2005	2015	2025
Count	717	699	680	689
Difference		−2.51%	−2.71%	+1.32%

Population statistic
Year	2024	2025
Count	694	689
Difference		−0.72%

It has a population of 689 people (31 December 2025).

=== Ethnicity ===
Census 2021 (1+ %)
Ethnicity	Number	Fraction
Slovak	657	96.47%
Not found out	21	3.08%
Total	681	

In year 2021 was 681 people by ethnicity 657 as Slovak, 21 as Not found out, 6 as Czech, 2 as Hungarian, 2 as Other, 1 as Russian and 1 as German.

Note on population: The difference values of population numbers in the table "Population statistic" and in the sections "Ethnicity" & "Religion" is caused by the use of various statistical methods.

=== Religion ===
Census 2021 (1+ %)
Religion	Number	Fraction
Roman Catholic Church	484	71.07%
None	156	22.91%
Not found out	22	3.23%
Evangelical Church	13	1.91%
Total	681	

In year 2021 was 681 people by religion 484 from Roman Catholic Church, 156 from None, 22 from Not found out, 13 from Evangelical Church, 2 from Greek Catholic Church, 2 from Ad hoc movements, 1 from Paganism and natural spirituality and 1 from Christian Congregations in Slovakia.

== Sights ==
The village bell tower is a replica of the original building from the 18th century. The tower houses a baroque bell made in 1739 by Jána Christelliho, a bell-maker from Bratislava.

== Awards ==
In 2020, the village was awarded with the Commemorative Medal for the 75th Anniversary of the Slovak National Uprising and the End of the Second World War by the Slovak minister of defense, Peter Gajdoš.
