= Vysočany (Bánovce nad Bebravou District) =

- Municipality
- Flag

- Location of Vysočany in the Trenčín Region Location of Vysočany in Slovakia
- Coordinates: 48°41′N 18°19′E
- Country: Slovakia
- Region: Trenčín Region
- District: Bánovce nad Bebravou District
- First mentioned: 1232

Area
  - Total: 4.32 km^{2} (1.67 sq mi)
- Elevation: 258 m (846 ft)

Population (2025)
  - Total: 120
- Time zone: UTC+1 (CET)
  - Summer (DST): UTC+2 (CEST)
- Postal code: 956 35
- Area code: +421 38
- Vehicle registration plate (until 2022): BN
- Website: www.vysocany.sk

Vysočany (Hungarian: Viszocsány) is a village and municipality in Bánovce nad Bebravou District in the Trenčín Region of north-western Slovakia.

== History ==
In historical records the village was first mentioned in 1232.

== Geography ==
The municipality lies at an altitude of 258 metres (846 ft) and covers an area of 4.32 km^{2} (1.67 sq mi) (2025).

== Population ==
Population statistic (10 years)
Year	1995	2005	2015	2025
Count	148	132	111	120
Difference		−10.81%	−15.90%	+8.10%

Population statistic
Year	2024	2025
Count	118	120
Difference		+1.69%

It has a population of 120 people (31 December 2025).

=== Ethnicity ===
Census 2021 (1+ %)
Ethnicity	Number	Fraction
Slovak	108	99.08%
Total	109	

In year 2021 was 109 people by ethnicity 108 as Slovak and 1 as Serbian.

Note on population: The difference values of population numbers in the table "Population statistic" and in the sections "Ethnicity" & "Religion" is caused by the use of various statistical methods.

=== Religion ===
Census 2021 (1+ %)
Religion	Number	Fraction
Roman Catholic Church	97	88.99%
None	10	9.17%
Total	109	

In year 2021 was 109 people by religion 97 from Roman Catholic Church, 10 from None, 1 from Eastern Orthodox Church and 1 from Evangelical Church.
