= Ľutov =

- Municipality
- Flag

- Location of Ľutov in the Trenčín Region Location of Ľutov in Slovakia
- Coordinates: 48.77°N 18.28°E
- Country: Slovakia
- Region: Trenčín Region
- District: Bánovce nad Bebravou District
- First mentioned: 1389

Area
  - Total: 8.57 km^{2} (3.31 sq mi)
- Elevation: 244 m (801 ft)

Population (2025)
  - Total: 177
- Time zone: UTC+1 (CET)
  - Summer (DST): UTC+2 (CEST)
- Postal code: 957 03
- Area code: +421 38
- Vehicle registration plate (until 2022): BN
- Website: www.lutov.sk

Ľutov (Hungarian: Litó) is a village and municipality in Bánovce nad Bebravou District in the Trenčín Region of north-western Slovakia.

== History ==
In historical records the village was first mentioned in 1389.

== Geography ==
The municipality lies at an altitude of 244 metres (801 ft) and covers an area of 8.57 km^{2} (3.31 sq mi) (2025).

== Population ==
Population statistic (10 years)
Year	1995	2005	2015	2025
Count	129	130	167	177
Difference		+0.77%	+28.46%	+5.98%

Population statistic
Year	2024	2025
Count	176	177
Difference		+0.56%

It has a population of 177 people (31 December 2025).

=== Ethnicity ===
Census 2021 (1+ %)
Ethnicity	Number	Fraction
Slovak	172	98.85%
Czech	2	1.14%
Total	174	

In year 2021 was 174 people by ethnicity 172 as Slovak, 2 as Czech, 1 as Not found out and 1 as German.

Note on population: The difference values of population numbers in the table "Population statistic" and in the sections "Ethnicity" & "Religion" is caused by the use of various statistical methods.

=== Religion ===
Census 2021 (1+ %)
Religion	Number	Fraction
Roman Catholic Church	67	38.51%
Evangelical Church	58	33.33%
None	42	24.14%
Ad hoc movements	4	2.3%
Greek Catholic Church	3	1.72%
Total	174	

In year 2021 was 174 people by religion 67 from Roman Catholic Church, 58 from Evangelical Church, 42 from None, 4 from Ad hoc movements and 3 from Greek Catholic Church.
