= Brezolupy =

- Municipality
- Flag

- Location of Brezolupy in the Trenčín Region Location of Brezolupy in Slovakia
- Coordinates: 48.70°N 18.30°E
- Country: Slovakia
- Region: Trenčín Region
- District: Bánovce nad Bebravou District
- First mentioned: 1323

Area
  - Total: 6.33 km^{2} (2.44 sq mi)
- Elevation: 222 m (728 ft)

Population (2025)
  - Total: 517
- Time zone: UTC+1 (CET)
  - Summer (DST): UTC+2 (CEST)
- Postal code: 957 01
- Area code: +421 38
- Vehicle registration plate (until 2022): BN
- Website: brezolupy.wbl.sk

Brezolupy (Hungarian: Bánnyíres) is a village and municipality in Bánovce nad Bebravou District in the Trenčín Region of north-western Slovakia.

== History ==
In historical records the village was first mentioned in 1323.

== Geography ==
The municipality lies at an altitude of 222 metres (728 ft) and covers an area of 6.33 km^{2} (2.44 sq mi) (2025).

== Population ==
Population statistic (10 years)
Year	1995	2005	2015	2025
Count	400	483	485	517
Difference		+20.75%	+0.41%	+6.59%

Population statistic
Year	2024	2025
Count	521	517
Difference		−0.76%

It has a population of 517 people (31 December 2025).

=== Ethnicity ===
Census 2021 (1+ %)
Ethnicity	Number	Fraction
Slovak	489	97.02%
Not found out	14	2.77%
Total	504	

In year 2021 was 504 people by ethnicity 489 as Slovak, 14 as Not found out, 2 as Czech, 2 as German, 2 as Moravian, 2 as Hungarian, 2 as Other and 1 as English.

Note on population: The difference values of population numbers in the table "Population statistic" and in the sections "Ethnicity" & "Religion" is caused by the use of various statistical methods.

=== Religion ===
Census 2021 (1+ %)
Religion	Number	Fraction
Roman Catholic Church	341	67.66%
None	89	17.66%
Evangelical Church	56	11.11%
Not found out	10	1.98%
Total	504	

In year 2021 was 504 people by religion 341 from Roman Catholic Church, 89 from None, 56 from Evangelical Church, 10 from Not found out, 4 from Greek Catholic Church, 1 from Paganism and natural spirituality, 1 from Christian Congregations in Slovakia, 1 from Other and 1 from Ad hoc movements.

== Genealogical resources ==
The records for genealogical research are available at the state archive "Statny Archiv in Nitra, Slovakia"

- Roman Catholic church records (births/marriages/deaths): 1679-1895 (parish B)

== See also ==
- List of municipalities and towns in Slovakia
