= Haláčovce =

- Municipality
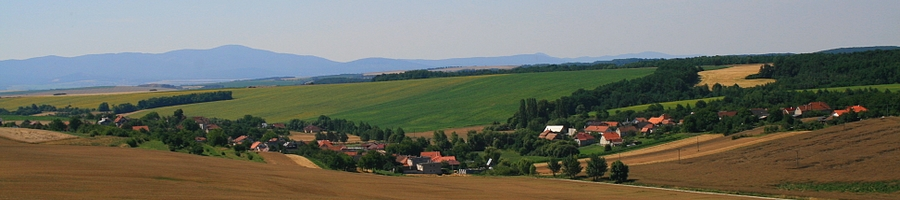

- Flag Coat of arms

- Location of Haláčovce in the Trenčín Region Location of Haláčovce in Slovakia
- Coordinates: 48.70°N 18.20°E
- Country: Slovakia
- Region: Trenčín Region
- District: Bánovce nad Bebravou District
- First mentioned: 1407

Area
  - Total: 4.69 km^{2} (1.81 sq mi)
- Elevation: 217 m (712 ft)

Population (2025)
  - Total: 351
- Time zone: UTC+1 (CET)
  - Summer (DST): UTC+2 (CEST)
- Postal code: 956 55
- Area code: +421 38
- Vehicle registration plate (until 2022): BN
- Website: www.halacovce.sk

Haláčovce (Hungarian: Halács) is a village and municipality in Bánovce nad Bebravou District in the Trenčín Region of north-western Slovakia.

== History ==
In historical records the village was first mentioned in 1407.

== Geography ==
The municipality lies at an altitude of 217 metres (712 ft) and covers an area of 4.69 km^{2} (1.81 sq mi) (2025).

== Population ==
Population statistic (10 years)
Year	1995	2005	2015	2025
Count	273	322	368	351
Difference		+17.94%	+14.28%	−4.61%

Population statistic
Year	2024	2025
Count	349	351
Difference		+0.57%

It has a population of 351 people (31 December 2025).

=== Ethnicity ===
Census 2021 (1+ %)
Ethnicity	Number	Fraction
Slovak	357	96.74%
Not found out	18	4.87%
Czech	5	1.35%
Total	369	

In year 2021 was 369 people by ethnicity 357 as Slovak, 18 as Not found out, 5 as Czech, 2 as Other and 1 as Moravian.

Note on population: The difference values of population numbers in the table "Population statistic" and in the sections "Ethnicity" & "Religion" is caused by the use of various statistical methods.

=== Religion ===
Census 2021 (1+ %)
Religion	Number	Fraction
Roman Catholic Church	304	82.38%
None	34	9.21%
Not found out	9	2.44%
Other and not ascertained christian church	8	2.17%
Other	6	1.63%
Evangelical Church	6	1.63%
Total	369	

In year 2021 was 369 people by religion 304 from Roman Catholic Church, 34 from None, 9 from Not found out, 8 from Other and not ascertained christian church, 6 from Other, 6 from Evangelical Church and 2 from Ad hoc movements.

== Genealogical resources ==
The records for genealogical research are available at the state archive "Statny Archiv in Nitra, Slovakia"

- Roman Catholic church records (births/marriages/deaths): 1750-1895 (parish B)
- Lutheran church records (births/marriages/deaths): 1729-1895 (parish B)

== See also ==
- List of municipalities and towns in Slovakia
