= Veľké Chlievany =

- Municipality
- Flag

- Location of Veľké Chlievany in the Trenčín Region Location of Veľké Chlievany in Slovakia
- Coordinates: 48.70°N 18.22°E
- Country: Slovakia
- Region: Trenčín Region
- District: Bánovce nad Bebravou District
- First mentioned: 1276

Area
  - Total: 5.14 km^{2} (1.98 sq mi)
- Elevation: 198 m (650 ft)

Population (2025)
  - Total: 494
- Time zone: UTC+1 (CET)
  - Summer (DST): UTC+2 (CEST)
- Postal code: 956 55
- Area code: +421 38
- Vehicle registration plate (until 2022): BN
- Website: velkechlievany.com

Veľké Chlievany (Hungarian: Nagyhelvény) is a village and municipality in Bánovce nad Bebravou District in the Trenčín Region of north-western Slovakia.

== History ==
In historical records the village was first mentioned in 1276.

== Geography ==
The municipality lies at an altitude of 198 metres (650 ft) and covers an area of 5.14 km^{2} (1.98 sq mi) (2025).

== Population ==
Population statistic (10 years)
Year	1995	2005	2015	2025
Count	400	456	490	494
Difference		+14%	+7.45%	+0.81%

Population statistic
Year	2024	2025
Count	492	494
Difference		+0.40%

It has a population of 494 people (31 December 2025).

=== Ethnicity ===
Census 2021 (1+ %)
Ethnicity	Number	Fraction
Slovak	486	97.59%
Not found out	7	1.4%
Total	498	

In year 2021 was 498 people by ethnicity 486 as Slovak, 7 as Not found out, 4 as Other, 3 as Ukrainian, 2 as Czech, 1 as Italian and 1 as Romani.

Note on population: The difference values of population numbers in the table "Population statistic" and in the sections "Ethnicity" & "Religion" is caused by the use of various statistical methods.

=== Religion ===
Census 2021 (1+ %)
Religion	Number	Fraction
Roman Catholic Church	386	77.51%
None	82	16.47%
Evangelical Church	15	3.01%
Not found out	8	1.61%
Total	498	

In year 2021 was 498 people by religion 386 from Roman Catholic Church, 82 from None, 15 from Evangelical Church, 8 from Not found out, 3 from Greek Catholic Church, 2 from Eastern Orthodox Church, 1 from Jehovah's Witnesses and 1 from Islam.
