= Slatinka nad Bebravou =

- Municipality
- Flag

- Location of Slatinka nad Bebravou in the Trenčín Region Location of Slatinka nad Bebravou in Slovakia
- Coordinates: 48.85°N 18.25°E
- Country: Slovakia
- Region: Trenčín Region
- District: Bánovce nad Bebravou District
- First mentioned: 1481

Area
  - Total: 9.53 km^{2} (3.68 sq mi)
- Elevation: 285 m (935 ft)

Population (2025)
  - Total: 199
- Time zone: UTC+1 (CET)
  - Summer (DST): UTC+2 (CEST)
- Postal code: 956 53
- Area code: +421 38
- Vehicle registration plate (until 2022): BN
- Website: www.slatinkanb.sk

Slatinka nad Bebravou (Hungarian: Alsószalatna) is a village and municipality in Bánovce nad Bebravou District in the Trenčín Region of north-western Slovakia.

== History ==
In historical records the village was first mentioned in 1332.

== Geography ==
The municipality lies at an altitude of 285 metres (935 ft) and covers an area of 9.53 km^{2} (3.68 sq mi) (2025).

== Population ==
Population statistic (10 years)
Year	1995	2005	2015	2025
Count	245	210	185	199
Difference		−14.28%	−11.90%	+7.56%

Population statistic
Year	2024	2025
Count	196	199
Difference		+1.53%

It has a population of 199 people (31 December 2025).

=== Ethnicity ===
Census 2021 (1+ %)
Ethnicity	Number	Fraction
Slovak	193	97.47%
Not found out	4	2.02%
Czech	3	1.51%
Total	198	

In year 2021 was 198 people by ethnicity 193 as Slovak, 4 as Not found out, 3 as Czech, 1 as Ukrainian and 1 as Other.

Note on population: The difference values of population numbers in the table "Population statistic" and in the sections "Ethnicity" & "Religion" is caused by the use of various statistical methods.

=== Religion ===
Census 2021 (1+ %)
Religion	Number	Fraction
Roman Catholic Church	146	73.74%
None	23	11.62%
Evangelical Church	18	9.09%
Not found out	6	3.03%
Eastern Orthodox Church	2	1.01%
Greek Catholic Church	2	1.01%
Total	198	

In year 2021 was 198 people by religion 146 from Roman Catholic Church, 23 from None, 18 from Evangelical Church, 6 from Not found out, 2 from Eastern Orthodox Church, 2 from Greek Catholic Church and 1 from Seventh-day Adventist Church.
