= Slatina nad Bebravou =

- Municipality
- Flag

- Location of Slatina nad Bebravou in the Trenčín Region Location of Slatina nad Bebravou in Slovakia
- Coordinates: 48.83°N 18.27°E
- Country: Slovakia
- Region: Trenčín Region
- District: Bánovce nad Bebravou District
- First mentioned: 1332

Area
  - Total: 11.53 km^{2} (4.45 sq mi)
- Elevation: 284 m (932 ft)

Population (2025)
  - Total: 456
- Time zone: UTC+1 (CET)
  - Summer (DST): UTC+2 (CEST)
- Postal code: 956 53
- Area code: +421 38
- Vehicle registration plate (until 2022): BN
- Website: www.slatinanadbebravou.dcom.sk

Slatina nad Bebravou (Hungarian: Felsőszalatna) is a village and municipality in the Bánovce nad Bebravou District of the Trenčín Region of Slovakia.

In 2018, archaeologists discovered relief-decorated shoulder boards made from bronze that were part of a breastplate of a Greek warrior at a Celtic sacrificial place near the village. Deputy of director of Slovak Archaeological Institute said that it is the oldest original Greek art relic in the area of Slovakia. Researchers analyzed the pieces, and determined they were once part of a relief that depicted the Amazonomachy.

== Geography ==
The municipality lies at an altitude of 284 metres (932 ft) and covers an area of 11.53 km^{2} (4.45 sq mi) (2025).

== Population ==
Population statistic (10 years)
Year	1995	2005	2015	2025
Count	519	489	429	456
Difference		−5.78%	−12.26%	+6.29%

Population statistic
Year	2024	2025
Count	456	456
Difference		+1.42%

It has a population of 456 people (31 December 2025).

=== Ethnicity ===
Census 2021 (1+ %)
Ethnicity	Number	Fraction
Slovak	440	97.34%
Not found out	11	2.43%
Total	452	

In year 2021 was 452 people by ethnicity 440 as Slovak, 11 as Not found out, 2 as Czech and 2 as Hungarian.

Note on population: The difference values of population numbers in the table "Population statistic" and in the sections "Ethnicity" & "Religion" is caused by the use of various statistical methods.

=== Religion ===
Census 2021 (1+ %)
Religion	Number	Fraction
Roman Catholic Church	265	58.63%
Evangelical Church	110	24.34%
None	52	11.5%
Not found out	10	2.21%
Apostolic Church	10	2.21%
Total	452	

In year 2021 was 452 people by religion 265 from Roman Catholic Church, 110 from Evangelical Church, 52 from None, 10 from Not found out, 10 from Apostolic Church, 4 from Greek Catholic Church and 1 from Other.
