= Šípkov =

- Municipality
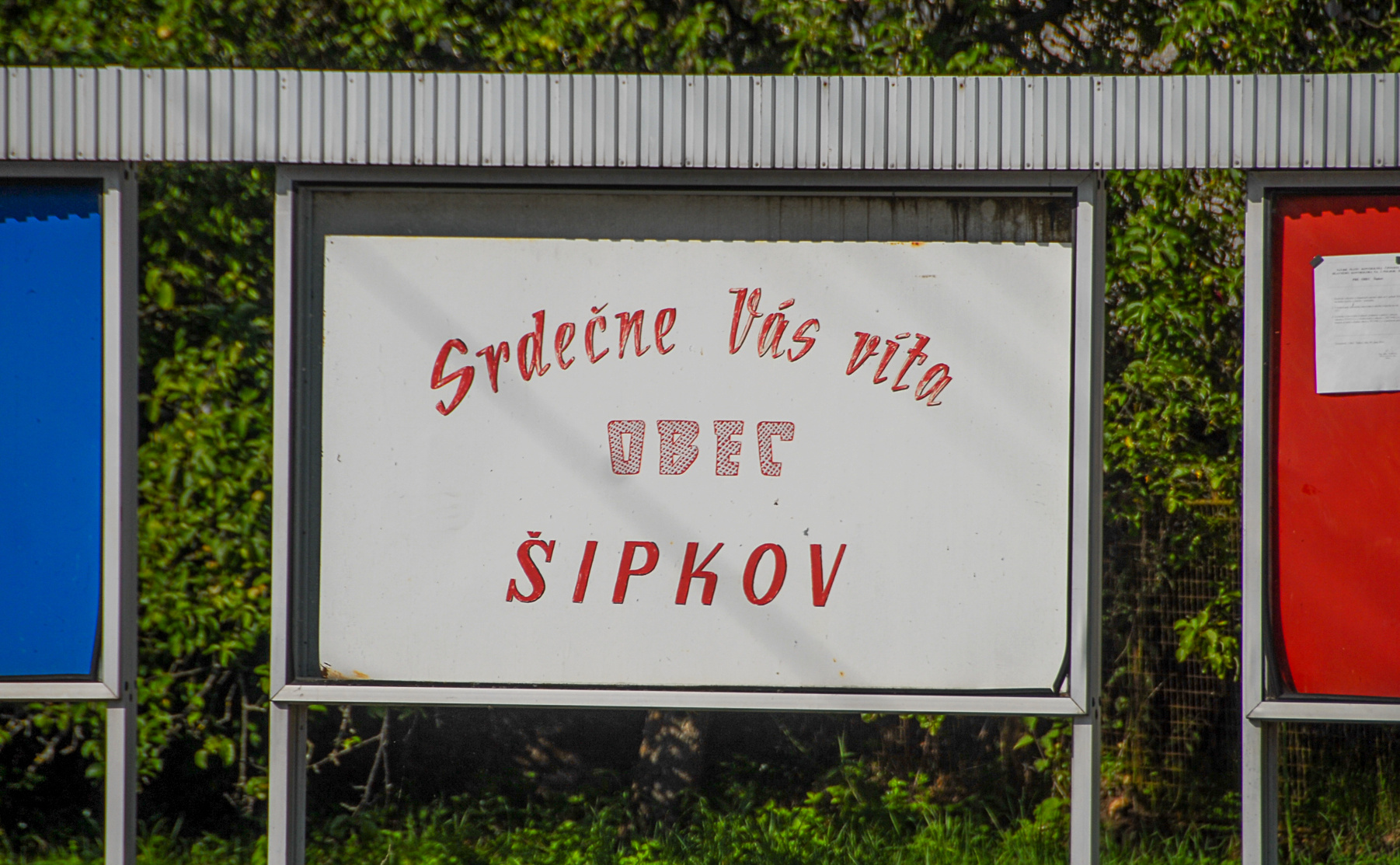

- Flag

- Location of Šípkov in the Trenčín Region Location of Šípkov in Slovakia
- Coordinates: 48.85°N 18.30°E
- Country: Slovakia
- Region: Trenčín Region
- District: Bánovce nad Bebravou District
- First mentioned: 1295

Area
  - Total: 11.55 km^{2} (4.46 sq mi)
- Elevation: 322 m (1,056 ft)

Population (2025)
  - Total: 146
- Time zone: UTC+1 (CET)
  - Summer (DST): UTC+2 (CEST)
- Postal code: 956 53
- Area code: +421 38
- Vehicle registration plate (until 2022): BN

Šípkov (Hungarian: Báncsipkés) is a village and municipality in Bánovce nad Bebravou District in the Trenčín Region of north-western Slovakia.

== History ==
In historical records the village was first mentioned in 1295.

== Geography ==
The municipality lies at an altitude of 322 metres (1,056 ft) and covers an area of 11.55 km^{2} (4.46 sq mi) (2025).

== Population ==
Population statistic (10 years)
Year	1995	2005	2015	2025
Count	191	149	138	146
Difference		−21.98%	−7.38%	+5.79%

Population statistic
Year	2024	2025
Count	144	146
Difference		+1.38%

It has a population of 146 people (31 December 2025).

=== Ethnicity ===
Census 2021 (1+ %)
Ethnicity	Number	Fraction
Slovak	145	97.31%
Not found out	7	4.69%
Total	149	

In year 2021 was 149 people by ethnicity 145 as Slovak, 7 as Not found out and 1 as Czech.

Note on population: The difference values of population numbers in the table "Population statistic" and in the sections "Ethnicity" & "Religion" is caused by the use of various statistical methods.

=== Religion ===
Census 2021 (1+ %)
Religion	Number	Fraction
Roman Catholic Church	125	83.89%
None	15	10.07%
Not found out	4	2.68%
Evangelical Church	4	2.68%
Total	149	

In year 2021 was 149 people by religion 125 from Roman Catholic Church, 15 from None, 4 from Not found out, 4 from Evangelical Church and 1 from Ad hoc movements.
