= Pečeňany =

- Municipality
- Flag Coat of arms

- Location of Pečeňany in the Trenčín Region Location of Pečeňany in Slovakia
- Coordinates: 48.67°N 18.23°E
- Country: Slovakia
- Region: Trenčín Region
- District: Bánovce nad Bebravou District
- First mentioned: 1323

Area
  - Total: 6.62 km^{2} (2.56 sq mi)
- Elevation: 197 m (646 ft)

Population (2025)
  - Total: 558
- Time zone: UTC+1 (CET)
  - Summer (DST): UTC+2 (CEST)
- Postal code: 956 36
- Area code: +421 38
- Vehicle registration plate (until 2022): BN
- Website: obecpecenany.sk

Pečeňany (Hungarian: Bánpecsenyéd) is a village and municipality in Bánovce nad Bebravou District in the Trenčín Region of north-western Slovakia.

== History ==
In historical records the village was first mentioned in 1323.

== Geography ==
The municipality lies at an altitude of 197 metres (646 ft) and covers an area of 6.62 km^{2} (2.56 sq mi) (2025).

== Population ==
Population statistic (10 years)
Year	1995	2005	2015	2025
Count	475	460	456	558
Difference		−3.15%	−0.86%	+22.36%

Population statistic
Year	2024	2025
Count	545	558
Difference		+2.38%

It has a population of 558 people (31 December 2025).

=== Ethnicity ===
Census 2021 (1+ %)
Ethnicity	Number	Fraction
Slovak	500	95.96%
Not found out	13	2.49%
Czech	9	1.72%
Total	521	

In year 2021 was 521 people by ethnicity 500 as Slovak, 13 as Not found out, 9 as Czech, 5 as Romani, 1 as Rusyn and 1 as Russian.

Note on population: The difference values of population numbers in the table "Population statistic" and in the sections "Ethnicity" & "Religion" is caused by the use of various statistical methods.

=== Religion ===
Census 2021 (1+ %)
Religion	Number	Fraction
Roman Catholic Church	384	73.7%
None	101	19.39%
Evangelical Church	15	2.88%
Not found out	11	2.11%
Total	521	

In year 2021 was 521 people by religion 384 from Roman Catholic Church, 101 from None, 15 from Evangelical Church, 11 from Not found out, 5 from Other and not ascertained christian church, 2 from Greek Catholic Church, 1 from Old Catholic Church, 1 from Islam and 1 from Other.
