= Rákoczi Oak =

Coordinates: 48°47′04″N 18°15′29″E

The Rákoczi Oak (Slovak: Rákocziho Dub) is a protected tree on the periphery of Strážov Mountains, near the village of Podlužany, Slovakia.

The exact age of the tree is unknown but it is alleged that the leader of uprising against Habsburgs, Francis II Rákóczi had built his tent beneath it when he marched with his army in the end of 17th century. Today it is an important natural landmark and a picnic site on the side of the marked green trail.
