= Trebichava =

- Municipality
- Flag

- Location of Trebichava in the Trenčín Region Location of Trebichava in Slovakia
- Coordinates: 48.82°N 18.30°E
- Country: Slovakia
- Region: Trenčín Region
- District: Bánovce nad Bebravou District
- First mentioned: 1396

Area
  - Total: 11.76 km^{2} (4.54 sq mi)
- Elevation: 334 m (1,096 ft)

Population (2025)
  - Total: 34
- Time zone: UTC+1 (CET)
  - Summer (DST): UTC+2 (CEST)
- Postal code: 956 53
- Area code: +421 38
- Vehicle registration plate (until 2022): BN
- Website: trebichava.sk

Trebichava (Hungarian: Terbók) is a village and municipality in Bánovce nad Bebravou District in the Trenčín Region of north-western Slovakia.

== History ==
In historical records the village was first mentioned in 1396.

== Geography ==
The municipality lies at an altitude of 334 metres (1,096 ft) and covers an area of 11.76 km^{2} (4.54 sq mi) (2025).

== Population ==
Population statistic (10 years)
| Year | 1995 | 2005 | 2015 | 2025 |
|---|---|---|---|---|
| Count | 56 | 43 | 38 | 34 |
| Difference | | −23.21% | −11.62% | −10.52% |

Population statistic
| Year | 2024 | 2025 |
|---|---|---|
| Count | 36 | 34 |
| Difference | | −5.55% |

It has a population of 34 people (31 December 2025).

=== Ethnicity ===
Census 2021 (1+ %)
| Ethnicity | Number | Fraction |
|---|---|---|
| Slovak | 38 | 92.68% |
| Not found out | 3 | 7.31% |
| Total | 41 | |

In year 2021 was 41 people by ethnicity 38 as Slovak and 3 as Not found out.

Note on population: The difference values of population numbers in the table "Population statistic" and in the sections "Ethnicity" & "Religion" is caused by the use of various statistical methods.

=== Religion ===
Census 2021 (1+ %)
| Religion | Number | Fraction |
|---|---|---|
| Roman Catholic Church | 26 | 63.41% |
| Evangelical Church | 7 | 17.07% |
| None | 5 | 12.2% |
| Not found out | 3 | 7.32% |
| Total | 41 | |

In year 2021 was 41 people by religion 26 from Roman Catholic Church, 7 from Evangelical Church, 5 from None and 3 from Not found out.
