= Kšinná =

- Municipality
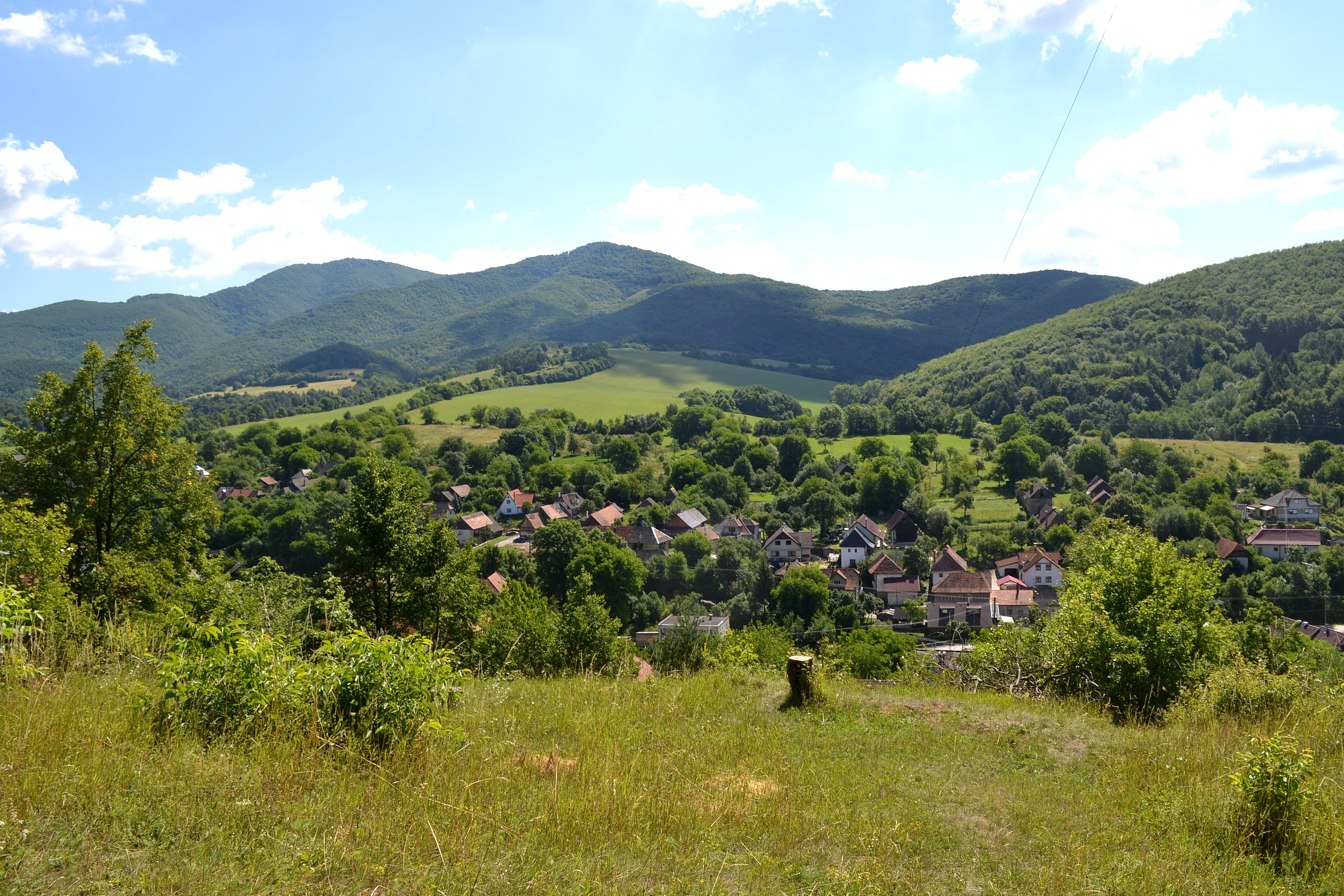

- Flag

- Location of Kšinná in the Trenčín Region Location of Kšinná in Slovakia
- Coordinates: 48.81°N 18.35°E
- Country: Slovakia
- Region: Trenčín Region
- District: Bánovce nad Bebravou District
- First mentioned: 1352

Area
  - Total: 41.24 km^{2} (15.92 sq mi)
- Elevation: 357 m (1,171 ft)

Population (2025)
  - Total: 462
- Time zone: UTC+1 (CET)
  - Summer (DST): UTC+2 (CEST)
- Postal code: 956 43
- Area code: +421 38
- Vehicle registration plate (until 2022): BN
- Website: www.ksinnazavada.sk

Kšinná (Hungarian: Kesnyő) is a village and municipality in Bánovce nad Bebravou District in the Trenčín Region of north-western Slovakia.

== History ==
In historical records the village was first mentioned in 1352.

== Geography ==
The municipality lies at an altitude of 357 metres (1,171 ft) and covers an area of 41.24 km^{2} (15.92 sq mi) (2025).

== Population ==
Population statistic (10 years)
Year	1995	2005	2015	2025
Count	598	541	507	462
Difference		−9.53%	−6.28%	−8.87%

Population statistic
Year	2024	2025
Count	475	462
Difference		−2.73%

It has a population of 462 people (31 December 2025).

=== Ethnicity ===
Census 2021 (1+ %)
Ethnicity	Number	Fraction
Slovak	482	99.17%
Czech	6	1.23%
Not found out	6	1.23%
Total	486	

In year 2021 was 486 people by ethnicity 482 as Slovak, 6 as Czech, 6 as Not found out, 1 as Serbian, 1 as Russian and 1 as Other.

Note on population: The difference values of population numbers in the table "Population statistic" and in the sections "Ethnicity" & "Religion" is caused by the use of various statistical methods.

=== Religion ===
Census 2021 (1+ %)
Religion	Number	Fraction
Evangelical Church	330	67.9%
None	87	17.9%
Roman Catholic Church	54	11.11%
United Methodist Church	5	1.03%
Total	486	

In year 2021 was 486 people by religion 330 from Evangelical Church, 87 from None, 54 from Roman Catholic Church, 5 from United Methodist Church, 3 from Not found out, 2 from Greek Catholic Church, 2 from Buddhism, 1 from Other, 1 from Seventh-day Adventist Church and 1 from Ad hoc movements.
