= Terézia Vansová =

Slovak writer

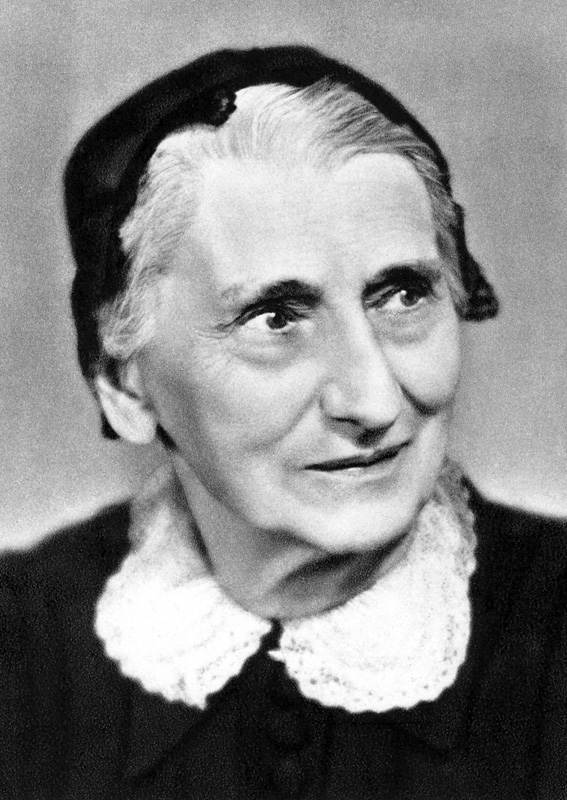
Terézia Vansová

Terézia Zuzana Vansová née Medvecká, pseudonyms Johanka Georgiadesová, Milka Žartovnická and Nemophila (1857–1942) was a pioneering Slovak female writer and editor during the period of realism. She wrote poetry in both German and Slovak, founded the first Slovak women's journal Dennica, and went on to write plays and novels. She became widely known for her novel Sirota Podhradských (The Podhradskýs' Orphan, 1889) which was deemed suitable for girls.

== Early life and education ==
Terézia Medvecká was born with a twin brother in Zvolenská Slatina on 18 April 1857. She was the seventh child of Terézia (née Langeová) and the Lutheran pastor Samuel Medvecký. After completing elementary school, she attended the private school of K. Orfanides in Banská Bystrica and that of T. Fábryová in Rimavská Sobota but like most girls of the times, she did not receive a gymnasium education. Nevertheless, she became fluent in German and Hungarian in addition to her native Slovak, thanks in part to her own voracious reading.

== Poetry and editing ==
In 1875, on marrying the Lutheran pastor Ján Vansa, the couple moved to Lomnička where Vansová began writing poetry in both German and Slovak. Her first work Moje piesne (My Songs, 1875) was a rather awkward collection of poems in German but was followed with more mature verses published in the local Karpathenpost. From 1881, the couple lived in Píla where Vansová worked as a writer, organizer and editor.

In 1895, she became associated with the Slovak women's association Živena, acting as vice-president and editing the Živena almanacs. In 1898, Vansová founded the first Slovak magazine for women, Dennica (Morning Star) which she edited until 1914. It presented stories, poems and essays by women writers as well as articles on fashion, food, married life and the women's movement around the world. With the establishment of Czechoslovakia in 1918, she edited Slovenská žena (Slovak Woman) from 1920 to 1923, although she no longer considered it to be "her magazine" as Dennica had been.

== Publications ==
As for her own publications, she is remembered mainly for her prose. In Prvotina (1889), she parodied the romantic sentimentality of articles in the popular German magazines, of which she was sometimes guilty herself. Her short stories frequently addressed relationships in a world of prejudice, such as the marital problems in Rozsobášení (Divorced, 1884), caused by misunderstandings and prejudice. In 1889, she published Sirota Podhradských (The Podhradskýs' Orphan), the first Slovak novel written by a woman. Its success stemmed from the psychological development of her characters, complex moral relationships, and a dramatic plot.

== Later life ==
After her husband's suicide in 1922, Vansová continued to write and to help others with their writing. She died on 10 October 1942.

Today Vansová is remembered for her romantic novels which were popular with schoolgirls for several decades but are no longer widely read. She also made a mark in the Slovak national movement. Although she was also active in the women's movement, her impact was less successful as the movement itself failed to make any real progress in Slovakia.
