= Veľké Hoste =

- Municipality
- Flag

- Location of Veľké Hoste in the Trenčín Region Location of Veľké Hoste in Slovakia
- Coordinates: 48.68°N 18.17°E
- Country: Slovakia
- Region: Trenčín Region
- District: Bánovce nad Bebravou District
- First mentioned: 1329

Area
  - Total: 8.26 km^{2} (3.19 sq mi)
- Elevation: 239 m (784 ft)

Population (2025)
  - Total: 522
- Time zone: UTC+1 (CET)
  - Summer (DST): UTC+2 (CEST)
- Postal code: 956 40
- Area code: +421 38
- Vehicle registration plate (until 2022): BN
- Website: www.velkehoste.sk

Veľké Hoste (Hungarian: Nagyvendég) is a village and municipality in Bánovce nad Bebravou District in the Trenčín Region of north-western Slovakia.

== History ==
In historical records the village was first mentioned in 1329.

== Geography ==
The municipality lies at an altitude of 239 metres (784 ft) and covers an area of 8.26 km^{2} (3.19 sq mi) (2025).

== Population ==
Population statistic (10 years)
Year	1995	2005	2015	2025
Count	556	541	569	522
Difference		−2.69%	+5.17%	−8.26%

Population statistic
Year	2024	2025
Count	520	522
Difference		+0.38%

It has a population of 522 people (31 December 2025).

=== Ethnicity ===
Census 2021 (1+ %)
Ethnicity	Number	Fraction
Slovak	546	98.55%
Not found out	8	1.44%
Total	554	

In year 2021 was 554 people by ethnicity 546 as Slovak, 8 as Not found out, 3 as Czech and 2 as Romanian.

Note on population: The difference values of population numbers in the table "Population statistic" and in the sections "Ethnicity" & "Religion" is caused by the use of various statistical methods.

=== Religion ===
Census 2021 (1+ %)
Religion	Number	Fraction
Roman Catholic Church	469	84.66%
None	51	9.21%
Not found out	10	1.81%
Christian Congregations in Slovakia	7	1.26%
Greek Catholic Church	7	1.26%
Evangelical Church	7	1.26%
Total	554	

In year 2021 was 554 people by religion 469 from Roman Catholic Church, 51 from None, 10 from Not found out, 7 from Christian Congregations in Slovakia, 7 from Greek Catholic Church, 7 from Evangelical Church, 1 from Paganism and natural spirituality, 1 from Other and not ascertained christian church and 1 from Other.
