= Malé Hoste =

- Municipality
- Flag

- Location of Malé Hoste in the Trenčín Region Malé Hoste (Slovakia)
- Coordinates: 48°42′N 18°08′E
- Country: Slovakia
- Region: Trenčín
- District: Bánovce nad Bebravou
- First mentioned: 1329

Government
  - Mayor: Marta Gregorová (SNS)

Area
  - Total: 6.80 km^{2} (2.63 sq mi)
- Elevation: 268 m (879 ft)

Population (2025)
  - Total: 404
- Time zone: UTC+1 (CET)
  - Summer (DST): UTC+2 (CEST)
- Postal code: 956 37 (pošta Zlatníky)
- Area code: 421-38
- Vehicle registration plate (until 2022): BN
- Website: malehoste.sk

Malé Hoste (Hungarian: Kisvendég) is a village and municipality in Bánovce nad Bebravou District in the Trenčín Region of north-western Slovakia.

== History ==
In historical records the village was first mentioned in 1329.

== Geography ==
The municipality lies at an altitude of 268 metres (879 ft) and covers an area of 6.80 km^{2} (2.63 sq mi) (2025).

== Population ==
Population statistic (10 years)
Year	1995	2005	2015	2025
Count	451	447	405	404
Difference		−0.88%	−9.39%	−0.24%

Population statistic
Year	2024	2025
Count	403	404
Difference		+0.24%

It has a population of 404 people (31 December 2025).

=== Ethnicity ===
Census 2021 (1+ %)
Ethnicity	Number	Fraction
Slovak	399	97.55%
Not found out	8	1.95%
Total	409	

In year 2021 was 409 people by ethnicity 399 as Slovak, 8 as Not found out, 2 as Czech, 2 as Other, 1 as Ukrainian and 1 as Romanian.

Note on population: The difference values of population numbers in the table "Population statistic" and in the sections "Ethnicity" & "Religion" is caused by the use of various statistical methods.

=== Religion ===
Census 2021 (1+ %)
Religion	Number	Fraction
Roman Catholic Church	313	76.53%
None	53	12.96%
Evangelical Church	11	2.69%
Not found out	9	2.2%
Christian Congregations in Slovakia	7	1.71%
Greek Catholic Church	5	1.22%
Total	409	

In year 2021 was 409 people by religion 313 from Roman Catholic Church, 53 from None, 11 from Evangelical Church, 9 from Not found out, 7 from Christian Congregations in Slovakia, 5 from Greek Catholic Church, 4 from Old Catholic Church, 3 from Calvinist Church, 1 from Eastern Orthodox Church, 1 from Other and not ascertained christian church, 1 from Other and 1 from Ad hoc movements.
