= Chudá Lehota =

- Municipality
- Flag

- Location of Chudá Lehota in the Trenčín Region Location of Chudá Lehota in Slovakia
- Coordinates: 48.65°N 18.20°E
- Country: Slovakia
- Region: Trenčín Region
- District: Bánovce nad Bebravou District
- First mentioned: 1400

Area
  - Total: 3.66 km^{2} (1.41 sq mi)
- Elevation: 223 m (732 ft)

Population (2025)
  - Total: 224
- Time zone: UTC+1 (CET)
  - Summer (DST): UTC+2 (CEST)
- Postal code: 956 38
- Area code: +421 38
- Vehicle registration plate (until 2022): BN
- Website: www.chlehota.sk

Chudá Lehota (Hungarian: Újülés) is a village and municipality in Bánovce nad Bebravou District in the Trenčín Region of north-western Slovakia.

== History ==
In historical records the village was first mentioned in 1400.

== Geography ==
The municipality lies at an altitude of 223 metres (732 ft) and covers an area of 3.66 km^{2} (1.41 sq mi) (2025).

== Population ==
Population statistic (10 years)
Year	1995	2005	2015	2025
Count	220	223	213	224
Difference		+1.36%	−4.48%	+5.16%

Population statistic
Year	2024	2025
Count	227	224
Difference		−1.32%

It has a population of 224 people (31 December 2025).

=== Ethnicity ===
Census 2021 (1+ %)
Ethnicity	Number	Fraction
Slovak	224	99.11%
Other	4	1.76%
Total	226	

In year 2021 was 226 people by ethnicity 224 as Slovak, 4 as Other, 2 as Not found out, 2 as German and 1 as Ukrainian.

Note on population: The difference values of population numbers in the table "Population statistic" and in the sections "Ethnicity" & "Religion" is caused by the use of various statistical methods.

=== Religion ===
Census 2021 (1+ %)
Religion	Number	Fraction
Roman Catholic Church	201	88.94%
None	19	8.41%
Total	226	

In year 2021 was 226 people by religion 201 from Roman Catholic Church, 19 from None, 2 from Not found out, 1 from Other and not ascertained christian church, 1 from Hinduism, 1 from Evangelical Church and 1 from Ad hoc movements.

== Genealogical resources ==
The records for genealogical research are available at the state archive "Statny Archiv in Nitra, Slovakia"

- Roman Catholic church records (births/marriages/deaths): 1781-1896 (parish B)

== See also ==
- List of municipalities and towns in Slovakia
