= Otrhánky =

- Municipality
- Flag Coat of arms

- Location of Otrhánky in the Trenčín Region Location of Otrhánky in Slovakia
- Coordinates: 48.70°N 18.22°E
- Country: Slovakia
- Region: Trenčín Region
- District: Bánovce nad Bebravou District
- First mentioned: 1598

Area
  - Total: 4.64 km^{2} (1.79 sq mi)
- Elevation: 232 m (761 ft)

Population (2025)
  - Total: 405
- Time zone: UTC+1 (CET)
  - Summer (DST): UTC+2 (CEST)
- Postal code: 956 55
- Area code: +421 38
- Vehicle registration plate (until 2022): BN
- Website: www.otrhanky.sk

Otrhánky (Hungarian: Eszterce) is a village and municipality in Bánovce nad Bebravou District in the Trenčín Region of north-western Slovakia.

== History ==
In historical records the village was first mentioned in 1598.

== Geography ==
The municipality lies at an altitude of 232 metres (761 ft) and covers an area of 4.64 km^{2} (1.79 sq mi) (2025).

== Population ==
Population statistic (10 years)
Year	1995	2005	2015	2025
Count	455	435	413	405
Difference		−4.39%	−5.05%	−1.93%

Population statistic
Year	2024	2025
Count	394	405
Difference		+2.79%

It has a population of 405 people (31 December 2025).

=== Ethnicity ===
Census 2021 (1+ %)
Ethnicity	Number	Fraction
Slovak	388	98.47%
Not found out	10	2.53%
Total	394	

In year 2021 was 394 people by ethnicity 388 as Slovak, 10 as Not found out, 2 as Other and 1 as Russian.

Note on population: The difference values of population numbers in the table "Population statistic" and in the sections "Ethnicity" & "Religion" is caused by the use of various statistical methods.

=== Religion ===
Census 2021 (1+ %)
Religion	Number	Fraction
Roman Catholic Church	351	89.09%
None	36	9.14%
Total	394	

In year 2021 was 394 people by religion 351 from Roman Catholic Church, 36 from None, 2 from Ad hoc movements, 1 from Not found out, 1 from Christian Congregations in Slovakia, 1 from Other, 1 from Greek Catholic Church and 1 from Evangelical Church.

== Famous people ==
- Ján Chrenko (*1908 – † 1982), SDB, Roman Catholic priest end religious prisoner (sentenced to 14 years in prison).
