= Dežerice =

- Municipality
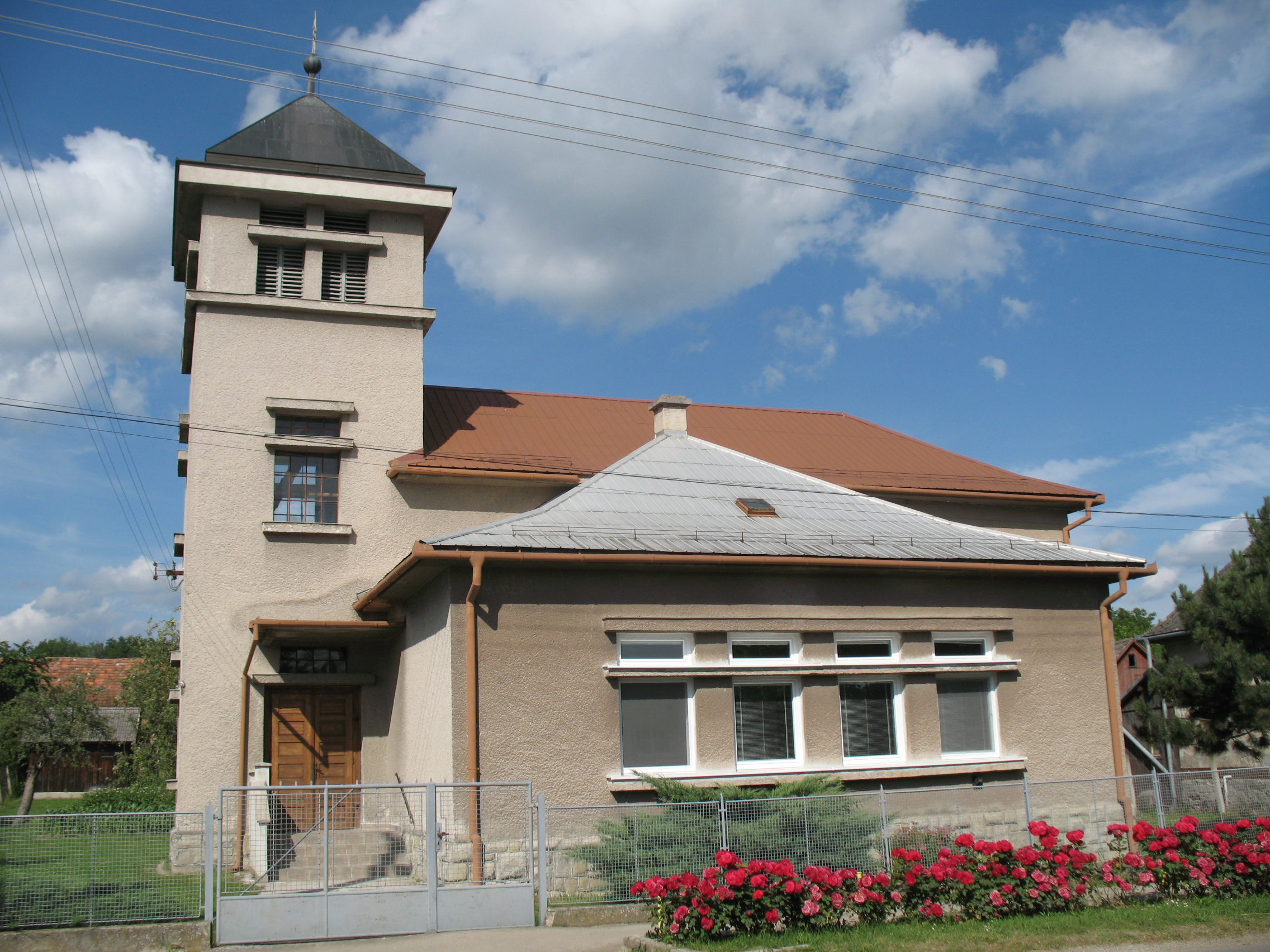

- Flag

- Location of Dežerice in the Trenčín Region Location of Dežerice in Slovakia
- Coordinates: 48.77°N 18.22°E
- Country: Slovakia
- Region: Trenčín Region
- District: Bánovce nad Bebravou District
- First mentioned: 1208

Area
  - Total: 13.03 km^{2} (5.03 sq mi)
- Elevation: 215 m (705 ft)

Population (2025)
  - Total: 1,145
- Time zone: UTC+1 (CET)
  - Summer (DST): UTC+2 (CEST)
- Postal code: 957 03
- Area code: +421 38
- Vehicle registration plate (until 2022): BN
- Website: www.dezerice.sk

Dežerice (Hungarian: Dezsér) is a village and municipality in the Bánovce nad Bebravou District, in the Trenčín Region of north-western Slovakia.

== History ==
The village was first mentioned in historical records in 1208.

== Geography ==
The municipality lies at an altitude of 215 metres (705 ft) and covers an area of 13.03 km^{2} (5.03 sq mi) (2025).

== Population ==
Population statistic (10 years)
Year	1995	2005	2015	2025
Count	567	624	814	1145
Difference		+10.05%	+30.44%	+40.66%

Population statistic
Year	2024	2025
Count	1150	1145
Difference		−0.43%

It has a population of 1145 people (31 December 2025).

=== Ethnicity ===
Census 2021 (1+ %)
Ethnicity	Number	Fraction
Slovak	983	96.46%
Not found out	27	2.64%
Total	1019	

In year 2021 was 1019 people by ethnicity 983 as Slovak, 27 as Not found out, 8 as Czech, 3 as Rusyn, 3 as Other, 2 as Serbian, 1 as Jewish, 1 as Ukrainian, 1 as Romani, 1 as Russian, 1 as Romanian, 1 as Austrian and 1 as English.

Note on population: The difference values of population numbers in the table "Population statistic" and in the sections "Ethnicity" & "Religion" is caused by the use of various statistical methods.

=== Religion ===
Census 2021 (1+ %)
Religion	Number	Fraction
Roman Catholic Church	642	63%
None	203	19.92%
Evangelical Church	124	12.17%
Not found out	23	2.26%
Total	1019	

In year 2021 was 1019 people by religion 642 from Roman Catholic Church, 203 from None, 124 from Evangelical Church, 23 from Not found out, 6 from Greek Catholic Church, 4 from Eastern Orthodox Church, 3 from Christian Congregations in Slovakia, 3 from Apostolic Church, 2 from Seventh-day Adventist Church, 2 from Buddhism, 2 from Ad hoc movements, 1 from Islam, 1 from Other, 1 from Hinduism, 1 from United Methodist Church and 1 from Church of Jesus Christ of Latter-day Saints.

== Genealogical resources ==
The records for genealogical research are available at the state archive "Statny Archiv in Nitra, Slovakia"

- Roman Catholic church records (births/marriages/deaths): 1713-1895 (parish A)
- Lutheran church records (births/marriages/deaths): 1732-1935 (parish B)

== See also ==
- List of municipalities and towns in Slovakia
