= Dolné Naštice =

- Municipality
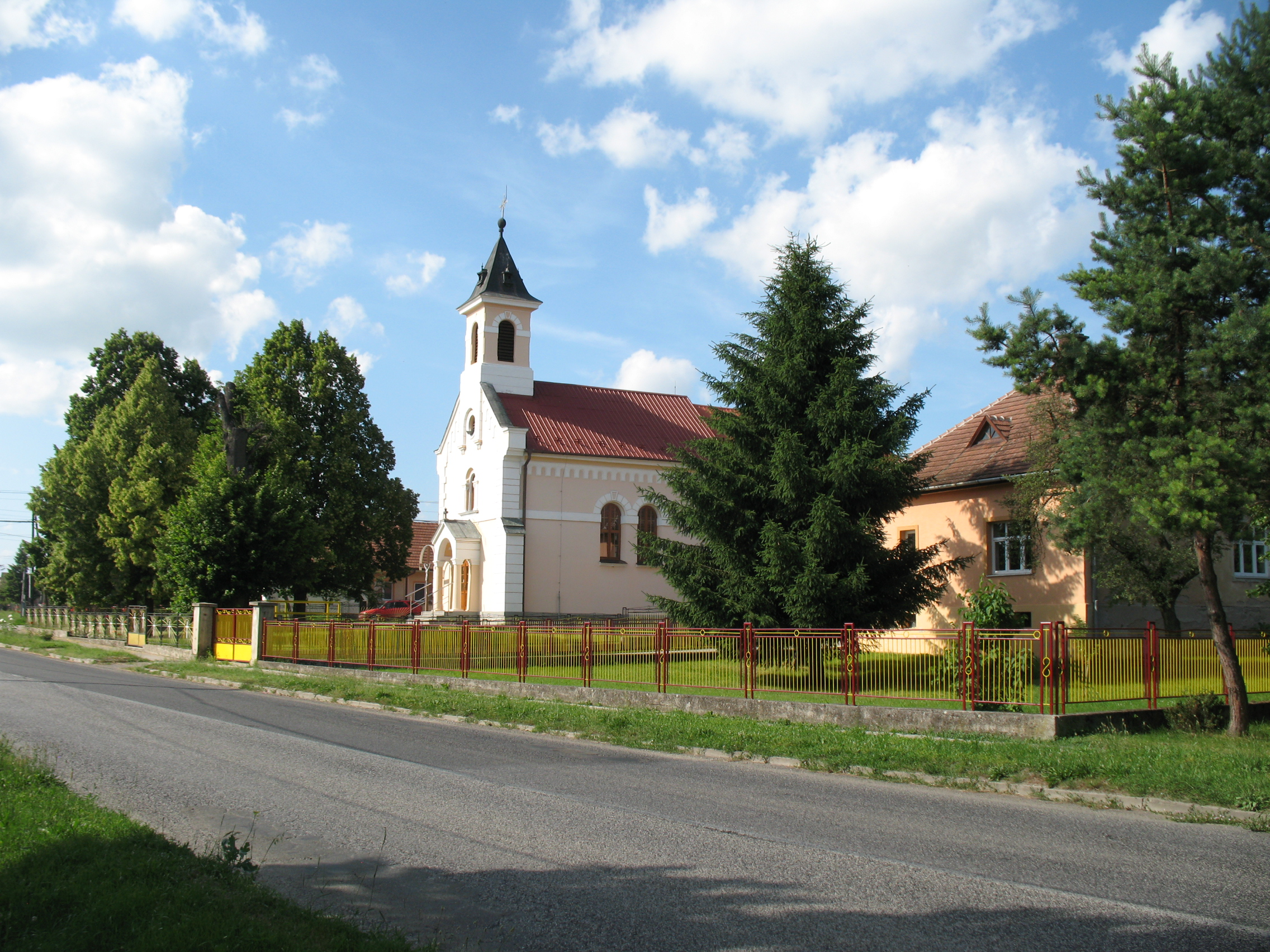

- Flag

- Location of Dolné Naštice in the Trenčín Region Location of Dolné Naštice in Slovakia
- Coordinates: 48.70°N 18.25°E
- Country: Slovakia
- Region: Trenčín Region
- District: Bánovce nad Bebravou District
- First mentioned: 1295

Area
  - Total: 4.63 km^{2} (1.79 sq mi)
- Elevation: 203 m (666 ft)

Population (2025)
  - Total: 612
- Time zone: UTC+1 (CET)
  - Summer (DST): UTC+2 (CEST)
- Postal code: 957 01
- Area code: +421 38
- Vehicle registration plate (until 2022): BN
- Website: www.obecdolnenastice.sk

Dolné Naštice (Hungarian: Alsóneszte) is a village and municipality in the Bánovce nad Bebravou District of the Trenčín Region of north-western Slovakia.

== History ==
In historical records the village was first mentioned in 1295.

== Geography ==
The municipality lies at an altitude of 203 metres (666 ft) and covers an area of 4.63 km^{2} (1.79 sq mi) (2025).

== Population ==
Population statistic (10 years)
Year	1995	2005	2015	2025
Count	429	430	549	612
Difference		+0.23%	+27.67%	+11.47%

Population statistic
Year	2024	2025
Count	596	612
Difference		+2.68%

It has a population of 612 people (31 December 2025).

=== Ethnicity ===
Census 2021 (1+ %)
Ethnicity	Number	Fraction
Slovak	552	93.87%
Not found out	32	5.44%
Total	588	

In year 2021 was 588 people by ethnicity 552 as Slovak, 32 as Not found out, 2 as Czech, 2 as Vietnamese, 1 as Romani, 1 as Rusyn, 1 as Polish, 1 as Hungarian and 1 as Other.

Note on population: The difference values of population numbers in the table "Population statistic" and in the sections "Ethnicity" & "Religion" is caused by the use of various statistical methods.

=== Religion ===
Census 2021 (1+ %)
Religion	Number	Fraction
Roman Catholic Church	445	75.68%
None	89	15.14%
Not found out	28	4.76%
Evangelical Church	15	2.55%
Total	588	

In year 2021 was 588 people by religion 445 from Roman Catholic Church, 89 from None, 28 from Not found out, 15 from Evangelical Church, 3 from Other and not ascertained christian church, 2 from Greek Catholic Church, 1 from Calvinist Church, 1 from Christian Congregations in Slovakia, 1 from Islam, 1 from Other, 1 from Buddhism and 1 from Ad hoc movements.

== Genealogical resources ==
The records for genealogical research are available at the state archive "Statny Archiv in Nitra, Slovakia"

- Roman Catholic church records (births/marriages/deaths): 1750–1895 (parish B)

== See also ==
- List of municipalities and towns in Slovakia
