= Dvorec =

- Municipality
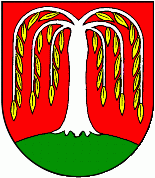
- Flag Coat of arms

- Location of Dvorec in the Trenčín Region Location of Dvorec in Slovakia
- Coordinates: 48.71°N 18.22°E
- Country: Slovakia
- Region: Trenčín Region
- District: Bánovce nad Bebravou District
- First mentioned: 1455

Area
  - Total: 2.65 km^{2} (1.02 sq mi)
- Elevation: 200 m (660 ft)

Population (2025)
  - Total: 527
- Time zone: UTC+1 (CET)
  - Summer (DST): UTC+2 (CEST)
- Postal code: 956 55
- Area code: +421 38
- Vehicle registration plate (until 2022): BN
- Website: www.dvorec.sk

Dvorec (Hungarian: Bánudvard) is a village and municipality in Bánovce nad Bebravou District in the Trenčín Region of north-western Slovakia.

== History ==
In historical records the village was first mentioned in 1455.

== Geography ==
The municipality lies at an altitude of 200 metres (660 ft) and covers an area of 2.65 km^{2} (1.02 sq mi) (2025).

== Population ==
Population statistic (10 years)
Year	1995	2005	2015	2025
Count	374	435	431	527
Difference		+16.31%	−0.91%	+22.27%

Population statistic
Year	2024	2025
Count	513	527
Difference		+2.72%

It has a population of 527 people (31 December 2025).

=== Ethnicity ===
Census 2021 (1+ %)
Ethnicity	Number	Fraction
Slovak	459	96.63%
Not found out	11	2.31%
Czech	7	1.47%
Total	475	

In year 2021 was 475 people by ethnicity 459 as Slovak, 11 as Not found out, 7 as Czech and 1 as German.

Note on population: The difference values of population numbers in the table "Population statistic" and in the sections "Ethnicity" & "Religion" is caused by the use of various statistical methods.

=== Religion ===
Census 2021 (1+ %)
Religion	Number	Fraction
Roman Catholic Church	369	77.68%
None	66	13.89%
Seventh-day Adventist Church	14	2.95%
Not found out	12	2.53%
Evangelical Church	10	2.11%
Total	475	

In year 2021 was 475 people by religion 369 from Roman Catholic Church, 66 from None, 14 from Seventh-day Adventist Church, 12 from Not found out, 10 from Evangelical Church, 2 from Greek Catholic Church, 1 from Paganism and natural spirituality and 1 from Other and not ascertained christian church.

== Genealogical resources ==
The records for genealogical research are available at the state archive "Statny Archiv in Bratislava, Slovakia"

- Roman Catholic church records (births/marriages/deaths): 1705-1896 (parish B)

== See also ==
- List of municipalities and towns in Slovakia
