= Prusy, Bánovce nad Bebravou District =

Prusy
- Municipality
- Flag

- Location of Prusy in the Trenčín Region Location of Prusy in Slovakia
- Coordinates: 48°46′N 18°16′E
- Country: Slovakia
- Region: Trenčín Region
- District: Bánovce nad Bebravou District
- First mentioned: 1208

Area
  - Total: 7.51 km^{2} (2.90 sq mi)
- Elevation: 222 m (728 ft)

Population (2025)
  - Total: 669
- Time zone: UTC+1 (CET)
  - Summer (DST): UTC+2 (CEST)
- Postal code: 957 03
- Area code: +421 38
- Vehicle registration plate (until 2022): BN
- Website: www.prusy.sk

Prusy (Hungarian: Poroszi) is a village and municipality in Bánovce nad Bebravou District in the Trenčín Region of north-western Slovakia.

== History ==
In historical records the village was first mentioned in 1208.

== Geography ==
The municipality lies at an altitude of 222 metres (728 ft) and covers an area of 7.51 km^{2} (2.90 sq mi) (2025).

== Population ==
Population statistic (10 years)
Year	1995	2005	2015	2025
Count	508	557	600	669
Difference		+9.64%	+7.71%	+11.5%

Population statistic
Year	2024	2025
Count	666	669
Difference		+0.45%

It has a population of 669 people (31 December 2025).

=== Ethnicity ===
Census 2021 (1+ %)
Ethnicity	Number	Fraction
Slovak	600	97.24%
Not found out	14	2.26%
Total	617	

In year 2021 was 617 people by ethnicity 600 as Slovak, 14 as Not found out, 3 as Ukrainian, 2 as Russian, 2 as Hungarian, 2 as Other, 1 as Czech, 1 as Romani and 1 as Austrian.

Note on population: The difference values of population numbers in the table "Population statistic" and in the sections "Ethnicity" & "Religion" is caused by the use of various statistical methods.

=== Religion ===
Census 2021 (1+ %)
Religion	Number	Fraction
Roman Catholic Church	457	74.07%
None	86	13.94%
Evangelical Church	40	6.48%
Not found out	18	2.92%
Total	617	

In year 2021 was 617 people by religion 457 from Roman Catholic Church, 86 from None, 40 from Evangelical Church, 18 from Not found out, 5 from Greek Catholic Church, 4 from Christian Congregations in Slovakia, 4 from Ad hoc movements, 1 from Old Catholic Church, 1 from Seventh-day Adventist Church and 1 from Buddhism.
