= Ján Bahýľ =

Slovak inventor and engineer

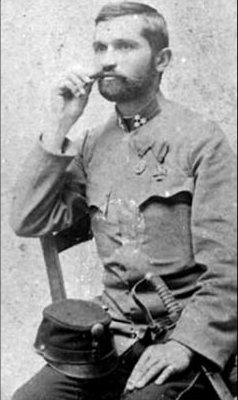
- Inventor
- Born: 25 May 1856; Nagyszalatna, Kingdom of Hungary, Austrian Empire
- Died: 13 March 1915 (aged 58); Pozsony, Kingdom of Hungary, Austria-Hungary
- Occupation: Inventor
- Spouse: Rozália Schwanzerová
- Children: Frida, Wilhelmina, Gustav

Ján Bahýľ (25 May 1856 – 13 March 1916) was a Slovak inventor and engineer. He specialised in military science, military construction, and engineering. Flying machines were a particular interest of his. In 1895, he was granted a patent on the helicopter.

== Biography ==
Bahýľ was born in Zvolenská Slatina in the Kingdom of Hungary (in present-day Slovakia). In 1869 he graduated from the Mining Academy of Banská Štiavnica with a diploma in technical drawing. After graduation, he joined the Hungarian Army; his superior officers noticed his technical ability and transferred him to the technical staff. The new assignment allowed Bahýľ to study at the Vienna Military Academy, where he graduated in 1879 and was commissioned as a lieutenant. During his time in the army, Bahýľ developed a number of inventions, many of which involved hydraulics.

== Inventions ==
Bahýľ financed his first invention himself. It was called the Steam Tank, and was purchased by the Russian army. Bahýľ was granted seventeen patents in all, including patents for the tank pump, a hot air balloon combined with an air turbine, the first petrol engine car in Slovakia (in partnership with Anton Marschall), and a lift to the Bratislava Castle. He flew one of the earliest helicopter models which he developed using an internal combustion engine as a power source. On 5 May 1905, a version reached a height of 14 ft (4.3 m) and flew 5,300 ft (1,615 m).
