= Libichava =

- Municipality
- Flag

- Location of Libichava in the Trenčín Region Location of Libichava in Slovakia
- Coordinates: 48.67°N 18.18°E
- Country: Slovakia
- Region: Trenčín Region
- District: Bánovce nad Bebravou District
- First mentioned: 1329

Area
  - Total: 2.62 km^{2} (1.01 sq mi)
- Elevation: 222 m (728 ft)

Population (2025)
  - Total: 139
- Time zone: UTC+1 (CET)
  - Summer (DST): UTC+2 (CEST)
- Postal code: 956 38
- Area code: +421 38
- Vehicle registration plate (until 2022): BN
- Website: www.obeclibichava.sk

Libichava (Hungarian: Libáka) is a village and municipality in Bánovce nad Bebravou District in the Trenčín Region of north-western Slovakia.

== History ==
In historical records the village was first mentioned in 1329.

== Geography ==
The municipality lies at an altitude of 222 metres (728 ft) and covers an area of 2.62 km^{2} (1.01 sq mi) (2025).

== Population ==
Population statistic (10 years)
Year	1995	2005	2015	2025
Count	172	174	136	139
Difference		+1.16%	−21.83%	+2.20%

Population statistic
Year	2024	2025
Count	138	139
Difference		+0.72%

It has a population of 139 people (31 December 2025).

=== Ethnicity ===
Census 2021 (1+ %)
Ethnicity	Number	Fraction
Slovak	136	95.77%
Czech	3	2.11%
Not found out	3	2.11%
Total	142	

In year 2021 was 142 people by ethnicity 136 as Slovak, 3 as Czech, 3 as Not found out and 1 as Italian.

Note on population: The difference values of population numbers in the table "Population statistic" and in the sections "Ethnicity" & "Religion" is caused by the use of various statistical methods.

=== Religion ===
Census 2021 (1+ %)
Religion	Number	Fraction
Roman Catholic Church	100	70.42%
None	32	22.54%
Not found out	3	2.11%
Other	3	2.11%
Evangelical Church	2	1.41%
Ad hoc movements	2	1.41%
Total	142	

In year 2021 was 142 people by religion 100 from Roman Catholic Church, 32 from None, 3 from Not found out, 3 from Other, 2 from Evangelical Church and 2 from Ad hoc movements.
