= Podlužany, Bánovce nad Bebravou District =

Podlužany
- Municipality
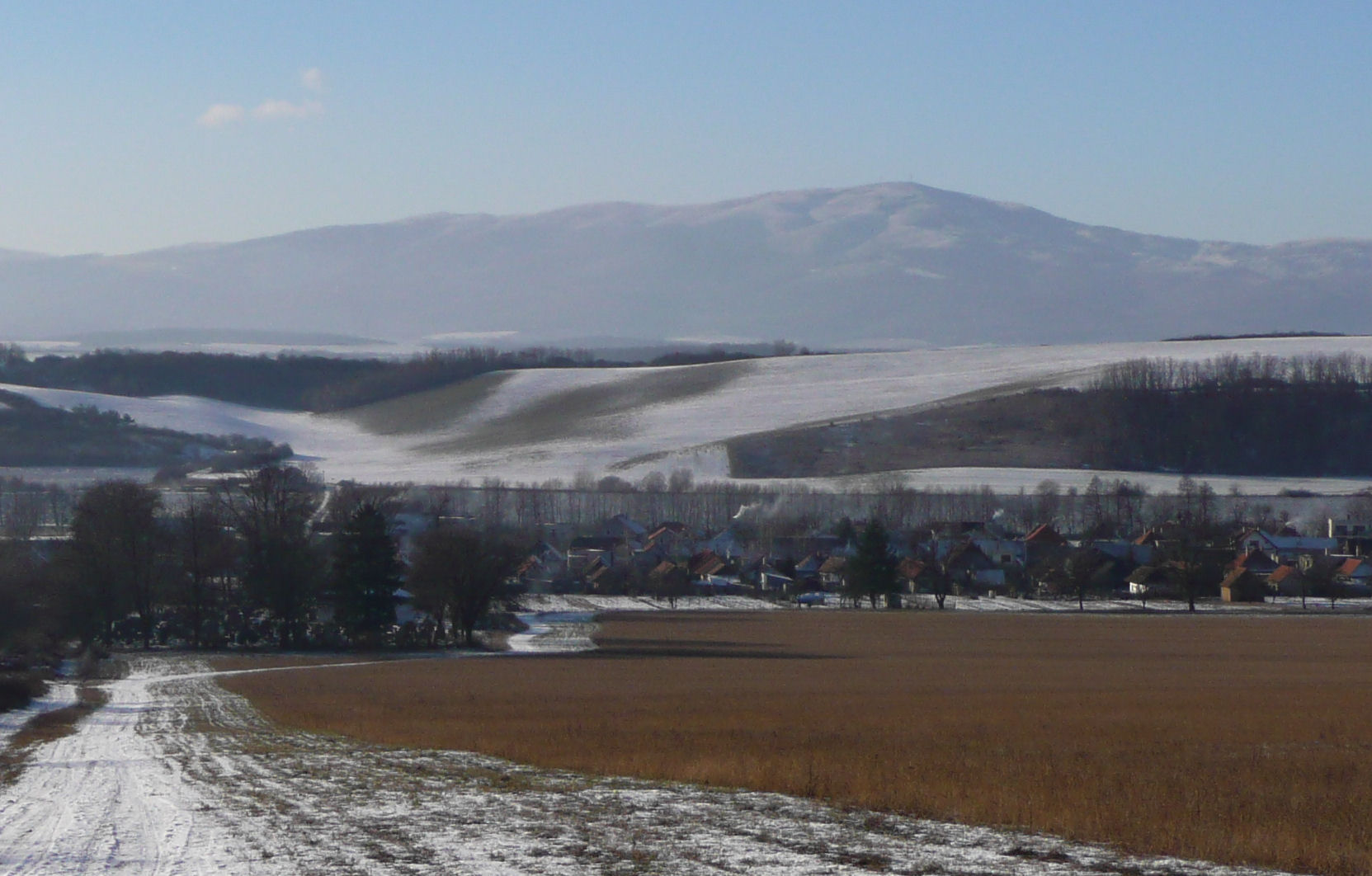

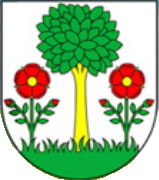
- Flag Coat of arms

- Location of Podlužany in the Trenčín Region Location of Podlužany in Slovakia
- Coordinates: 48°46′15″N 18°14′21″E
- Country: Slovakia
- Region: Trenčín Region
- District: Bánovce nad Bebravou District
- First mentioned: 1295

Area
  - Total: 14.02 km^{2} (5.41 sq mi)
- Elevation: 217 m (712 ft)

Population (2025)
  - Total: 954
- Time zone: UTC+1 (CET)
  - Summer (DST): UTC+2 (CEST)
- Postal code: 956 52
- Area code: +421 38
- Vehicle registration plate (until 2022): BN
- Website: www.podluzany.eu

Podlužany (Hungarian: Bánluzsány) is a village in north-western Slovakia.

== Geography ==
Podlužany is located approximately 7 km north from Bánovce nad Bebravou and it constitutes the entrance gate into the micro-region Podhorie. The small river Bebrava flows past the west side of the village. It is surrounded by forests, fields and meadows scattered on nearby hills. There are five nature reservation around: Kňaží stôl (free transl: The Priest's Table), Ľutovský Drieňovec, Smradľavý vrch (free transl: Stinking Mountain), Udrina, Žrebíky; two nature landmarks: Stará Bebrava stream and Dúpna diera cave.

== Geography ==
The municipality lies at an altitude of 217 metres (712 ft) and covers an area of 14.02 km^{2} (5.41 sq mi) (2025).

== Population ==
Population statistic (10 years)
Year	1995	2005	2015	2025
Count	845	813	868	954
Difference		−3.78%	+6.76%	+9.90%

Population statistic
Year	2024	2025
Count	964	954
Difference		−1.03%

It has a population of 954 people (31 December 2025).

=== Ethnicity ===
Census 2021 (1+ %)
Ethnicity	Number	Fraction
Slovak	901	96.46%
Not found out	20	2.14%
Total	934	

In year 2021 was 934 people by ethnicity 901 as Slovak, 20 as Not found out, 9 as Ukrainian, 6 as Czech, 4 as Italian, 2 as Romani, 2 as Other, 1 as Serbian and 1 as Croatian.

Note on population: The difference values of population numbers in the table "Population statistic" and in the sections "Ethnicity" & "Religion" is caused by the use of various statistical methods.

=== Religion ===
Census 2021 (1+ %)
Religion	Number	Fraction
Roman Catholic Church	422	45.18%
Evangelical Church	315	33.73%
None	160	17.13%
Not found out	21	2.25%
Eastern Orthodox Church	10	1.07%
Total	934	

In year 2021 was 934 people by religion 422 from Roman Catholic Church, 315 from Evangelical Church, 160 from None, 21 from Not found out, 10 from Eastern Orthodox Church, 3 from Paganism and natural spirituality, 2 from Greek Catholic Church and 1 from Ad hoc movements.

== Tourism ==
Podlužany, together with its nearby villages and surrounding landscape, is often visited by hikers. In the village starts green marked trail that leads to trail junction in Trebichavské sedlo ridge past the mysterious tree Rakoczi Oak upon which a legend hovers which says that the leader of uprising against Habsburgs, Francis II Rákóczi took a rest in the end of 17th century.
