= Dubnička =

- Municipality
- Flag

- Location of Dubnička in the Trenčín Region Location of Dubnička in Slovakia
- Coordinates: 48.77°N 18.30°E
- Country: Slovakia
- Region: Trenčín Region
- District: Bánovce nad Bebravou District
- First mentioned: 1389

Area
  - Total: 8.10 km^{2} (3.13 sq mi)
- Elevation: 255 m (837 ft)

Population (2025)
  - Total: 129
- Time zone: UTC+1 (CET)
  - Summer (DST): UTC+2 (CEST)
- Postal code: 957 03
- Area code: +421 38
- Vehicle registration plate (until 2022): BN
- Website: www.dubnicka.sk

Dubnička (Hungarian: Bántölgyes) is a village and municipality in Bánovce nad Bebravou District in the Trenčín Region of north-western Slovakia.

== History ==
In historical records the village was first mentioned in 1389.

== Geography ==
The municipality lies at an altitude of 255 metres (837 ft) and covers an area of 8.10 km^{2} (3.13 sq mi) (2025).

== Population ==
Population statistic (10 years)
Year	1995	2005	2015	2025
Count	88	75	118	129
Difference		−14.77%	+57.33%	+9.32%

Population statistic
Year	2024	2025
Count	123	129
Difference		+4.87%

It has a population of 129 people (31 December 2025).

=== Ethnicity ===
Census 2021 (1+ %)
Ethnicity	Number	Fraction
Slovak	121	97.58%
Czech	2	1.61%
Total	124	

In year 2021 was 124 people by ethnicity 121 as Slovak, 2 as Czech and 1 as Not found out.

Note on population: The difference values of population numbers in the table "Population statistic" and in the sections "Ethnicity" & "Religion" is caused by the use of various statistical methods.

=== Religion ===
Census 2021 (1+ %)
Religion	Number	Fraction
Roman Catholic Church	76	61.29%
None	27	21.77%
Evangelical Church	18	14.52%
Christian Congregations in Slovakia	2	1.61%
Total	124	

In year 2021 was 124 people by religion 76 from Roman Catholic Church, 27 from None, 18 from Evangelical Church, 2 from Christian Congregations in Slovakia and 1 from Not found out.

== Genealogical resources ==
The records for genealogical research are available at the state archive "Statny Archiv in Nitra, Slovakia"

- Roman Catholic church records (births/marriages/deaths): 1740-1896 (parish B)

== See also ==
- List of municipalities and towns in Slovakia
