= Ruskovce, Bánovce nad Bebravou District =

Ruskovce
- Municipality
- Flag

- Location of Ruskovce in the Trenčín Region Location of Ruskovce in Slovakia
- Coordinates: 48°44′38″N 18°11′20″E
- Country: Slovakia
- Region: Trenčín Region
- District: Bánovce nad Bebravou District
- First mentioned: 1329

Area
  - Total: 3.35 km^{2} (1.29 sq mi)
- Elevation: 226 m (741 ft)

Population (2025)
  - Total: 511
- Time zone: UTC+1 (CET)
  - Summer (DST): UTC+2 (CEST)
- Postal code: 956 54
- Area code: +421 38
- Vehicle registration plate (until 2022): BN
- Website: obecruskovce.sk

Ruskovce (Hungarian: Bánruszkóc) is a village and municipality in Bánovce nad Bebravou District in the Trenčín Region of north-western Slovakia.

== History ==
In historical records the village was first mentioned in 1329.

== Geography ==
The municipality lies at an altitude of 226 metres (741 ft) and covers an area of 3.35 km^{2} (1.29 sq mi) (2025).

== Population ==
Population statistic (10 years)
Year	1995	2005	2015	2025
Count	537	539	513	511
Difference		+0.37%	−4.82%	−0.38%

Population statistic
Year	2024	2025
Count	518	511
Difference		−1.35%

It has a population of 511 people (31 December 2025).

=== Ethnicity ===
Census 2021 (1+ %)
Ethnicity	Number	Fraction
Slovak	513	98.84%
Czech	6	1.15%
Not found out	6	1.15%
Total	519	

In year 2021 was 519 people by ethnicity 513 as Slovak, 6 as Czech, 6 as Not found out, 1 as Jewish and 1 as Rusyn.

Note on population: The difference values of population numbers in the table "Population statistic" and in the sections "Ethnicity" & "Religion" is caused by the use of various statistical methods.

=== Religion ===
Census 2021 (1+ %)
Religion	Number	Fraction
Roman Catholic Church	443	85.36%
None	38	7.32%
Evangelical Church	21	4.05%
Total	519	

In year 2021 was 519 people by religion 443 from Roman Catholic Church, 38 from None, 21 from Evangelical Church, 5 from Not found out, 4 from Greek Catholic Church, 4 from Seventh-day Adventist Church, 2 from Christian Congregations in Slovakia, 1 from Baptists Church and 1 from Ad hoc movements.
