= Omastiná =

- Municipality
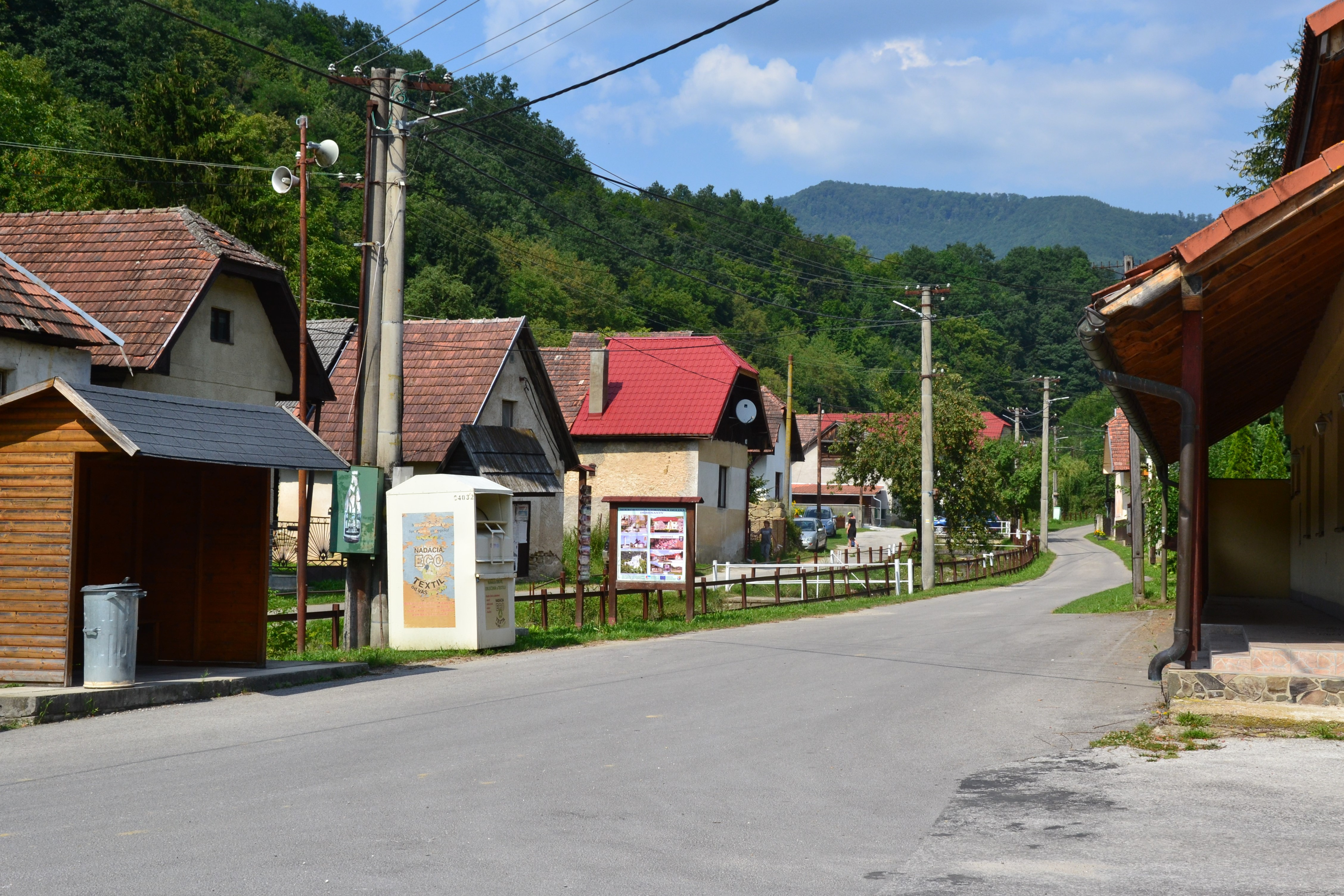

- Flag

- Location of Omastiná in the Trenčín Region Location of Omastiná in Slovakia
- Coordinates: 48.78°N 18.38°E
- Country: Slovakia
- Region: Trenčín Region
- District: Bánovce nad Bebravou District
- First mentioned: 1389

Area
  - Total: 12.44 km^{2} (4.80 sq mi)
- Elevation: 334 m (1,096 ft)

Population (2025)
  - Total: 45
- Time zone: UTC+1 (CET)
  - Summer (DST): UTC+2 (CEST)
- Postal code: 956 42
- Area code: +421 38
- Vehicle registration plate (until 2022): BN
- Website: www.omastina.sk

Omastiná (Hungarian: Csermely) is a village and municipality in Bánovce nad Bebravou District in the Trenčín Region of north-western Slovakia.

== History ==
In historical records the village was first mentioned in 1389.

== Geography ==
The municipality lies at an altitude of 334 metres (1,096 ft) and covers an area of 12.44 km^{2} (4.80 sq mi) (2025).

== Population ==
Population statistic (10 years)
Year	1995	2005	2015	2025
Count	76	43	35	45
Difference		−43.42%	−18.60%	+28.57%

Population statistic
Year	2024	2025
Count	42	45
Difference		+7.14%

It has a population of 45 people (31 December 2025).

=== Ethnicity ===
Census 2021 (1+ %)
Ethnicity	Number	Fraction
Slovak	40	100%
Czech	1	2.5%
Total	40	

In year 2021 was 40 people by ethnicity 40 as Slovak and 1 as Czech.

Note on population: The difference values of population numbers in the table "Population statistic" and in the sections "Ethnicity" & "Religion" is caused by the use of various statistical methods.

=== Religion ===
Census 2021 (1+ %)
Religion	Number	Fraction
Evangelical Church	18	45%
None	14	35%
Roman Catholic Church	8	20%
Total	40	

In year 2021 was 40 people by religion 18 from Evangelical Church, 14 from None and 8 from Roman Catholic Church.
