= Žitná-Radiša =

- Municipality
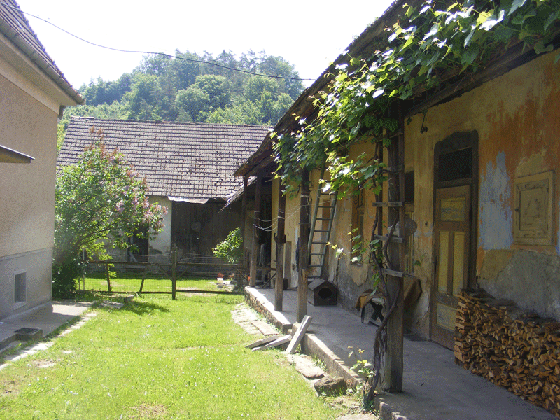

- Flag

- Location of Žitná-Radiša in the Trenčín Region Location of Žitná-Radiša in Slovakia
- Coordinates: 48.77°N 18.34°E
- Country: Slovakia
- Region: Trenčín Region
- District: Bánovce nad Bebravou District
- First mentioned: 1295

Area
  - Total: 17.76 km^{2} (6.86 sq mi)
- Elevation: 271 m (889 ft)

Population (2025)
  - Total: 439
- Time zone: UTC+1 (CET)
  - Summer (DST): UTC+2 (CEST)
- Postal code: 956 42
- Area code: +421 38
- Vehicle registration plate (until 2022): BN
- Website: www.zitna-radisa.sk

Žitná-Radiša (Hungarian: Búzásradosa) is a village and municipality in Bánovce nad Bebravou District in the Trenčín Region of north-western Slovakia.

== History ==
In historical records, the village was first mentioned in 1295.

== Geography ==
The municipality lies at an altitude of 271 metres (889 ft) and covers an area of 17.76 km^{2} (6.86 sq mi) (2025).

== Population ==
Population statistic (10 years)
Year	1995	2005	2015	2025
Count	466	453	444	439
Difference		−2.78%	−1.98%	−1.12%

Population statistic
Year	2024	2025
Count	436	439
Difference		+0.68%

It has a population of 439 people (31 December 2025).

=== Ethnicity ===
Census 2021 (1+ %)
Ethnicity	Number	Fraction
Slovak	431	96.2%
Not found out	16	3.57%
Total	448	

In year 2021 was 448 people by ethnicity 431 as Slovak, 16 as Not found out, 4 as Ukrainian, 2 as Romani, 1 as Czech, 1 as Moravian and 1 as Hungarian.

Note on population: The difference values of population numbers in the table "Population statistic" and in the sections "Ethnicity" & "Religion" is caused by the use of various statistical methods.

=== Religion ===
Census 2021 (1+ %)
Religion	Number	Fraction
Evangelical Church	267	59.6%
Roman Catholic Church	83	18.53%
None	81	18.08%
Not found out	11	2.46%
Total	448	

In year 2021 was 448 people by religion 267 from Evangelical Church, 83 from Roman Catholic Church, 81 from None, 11 from Not found out, 3 from Eastern Orthodox Church and 3 from Apostolic Church.
