= Čierna Lehota, Bánovce nad Bebravou District =

Čierna Lehota
- Municipality
- Flag

- Location of Čierna Lehota in the Trenčín Region Location of Čierna Lehota in Slovakia
- Coordinates: 48°52′N 18°20′E
- Country: Slovakia
- Region: Trenčín Region
- District: Bánovce nad Bebravou District
- First mentioned: 1389

Area
  - Total: 15.27 km^{2} (5.90 sq mi)
- Elevation: 390 m (1,280 ft)

Population (2025)
  - Total: 110
- Time zone: UTC+1 (CET)
  - Summer (DST): UTC+2 (CEST)
- Postal code: 956 53
- Area code: +421 38
- Vehicle registration plate (until 2022): BN
- Website: www.ciernalehota.sk

Čierna Lehota (Hungarian: Csarnólak) is a village and municipality in the Bánovce nad Bebravou District of the Trenčín Region of Slovakia.

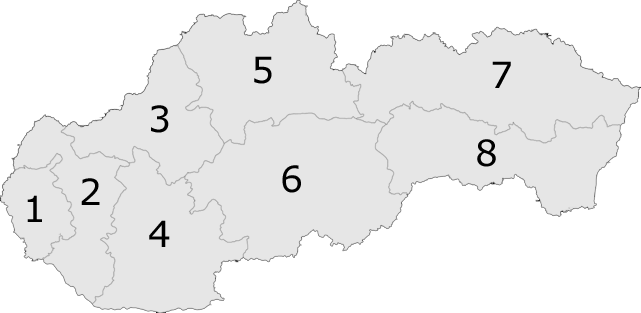
Position of the Trenčín Region marked '3' in Slovakia

== Geography ==
The municipality lies at an altitude of 390 metres (1,280 ft) and covers an area of 15.27 km^{2} (5.90 sq mi) (2025).

== Population ==
Population statistic (10 years)
Year	1995	2005	2015	2025
Count	197	147	114	110
Difference		−25.38%	−22.44%	−3.50%

Population statistic
Year	2024	2025
Count	110	110
Difference		−1.42%

It has a population of 110 people (31 December 2025).

=== Ethnicity ===
Census 2021 (1+ %)
Ethnicity	Number	Fraction
Slovak	109	99.09%
Total	110	

In year 2021 was 110 people by ethnicity 109 as Slovak, 1 as Czech and 1 as Not found out.

Note on population: The difference values of population numbers in the table "Population statistic" and in the sections "Ethnicity" & "Religion" is caused by the use of various statistical methods.

=== Religion ===
Census 2021 (1+ %)
Religion	Number	Fraction
Roman Catholic Church	83	75.45%
None	15	13.64%
Evangelical Church	6	5.45%
Other	3	2.73%
Not found out	2	1.82%
Total	110	

In year 2021 was 110 people by religion 83 from Roman Catholic Church, 15 from None, 6 from Evangelical Church, 3 from Other, 2 from Not found out and 1 from Calvinist Church.

== Genealogical resources ==
The records for genealogical research are available at the state archive "Statny Archiv in Nitra, Slovakia"

- Roman Catholic church records (births/marriages/deaths): 1744-1942 (parish B)
- Lutheran church records (births/marriages/deaths): 1732-1935 (parish B)

== See also ==
- List of municipalities and towns in Slovakia
