= Lesná =

Lesná may refer to places:

== Czech Republic ==
- Lesná (Pelhřimov District), a municipality and village in the Vysočina Region
- Lesná (Tachov District), a municipality and village in the Plzeň Region
- Lesná (Třebíč District), a municipality and village in the Vysočina Region
- Lesná (Znojmo District), a municipality and village in the South Moravian Region
- Lesná (Brno), a part of Brno in the South Moravian Region
- Lesná, a village and part of Nová Ves v Horách in the Ústí nad Labem Region
- Děčín XXXV-Lesná, a village and part of Děčín in the Ústí nad Labem Region

== Slovakia ==
- Nová Lesná, a village in Poprad District
- Oravská Lesná, a village in Námestovo District
- Rajecká Lesná, a village in Žilina District
- Stará Lesná, a village in Kežmarok District
- Veľká Lesná, a village in Stará Ľubovňa District

== See also ==
- Lesna (disambiguation)
