= Krzyżanów =

Krzyżanów may refer to the following places in Poland:

- Krzyżanów, Lower Silesian Voivodeship (south-west Poland)
- Krzyżanów, Kutno County in Łódź Voivodeship (central Poland)
- Krzyżanów, Piotrków County in Łódź Voivodeship (central Poland)
