= Gołaczów =

Gołaczów may refer to:

- Gołaczów, Kłodzko County, Gmina Lewin Kłodzki, Kłodzko County in Lower Silesian Voivodeship (SW Poland)
- Gołaczów, Legnica County, Gmina Chojnów, Legnica County in Lower Silesian Voivodeship (SW Poland)
