= Violetta Villas =

Polish singer (1938–2011)

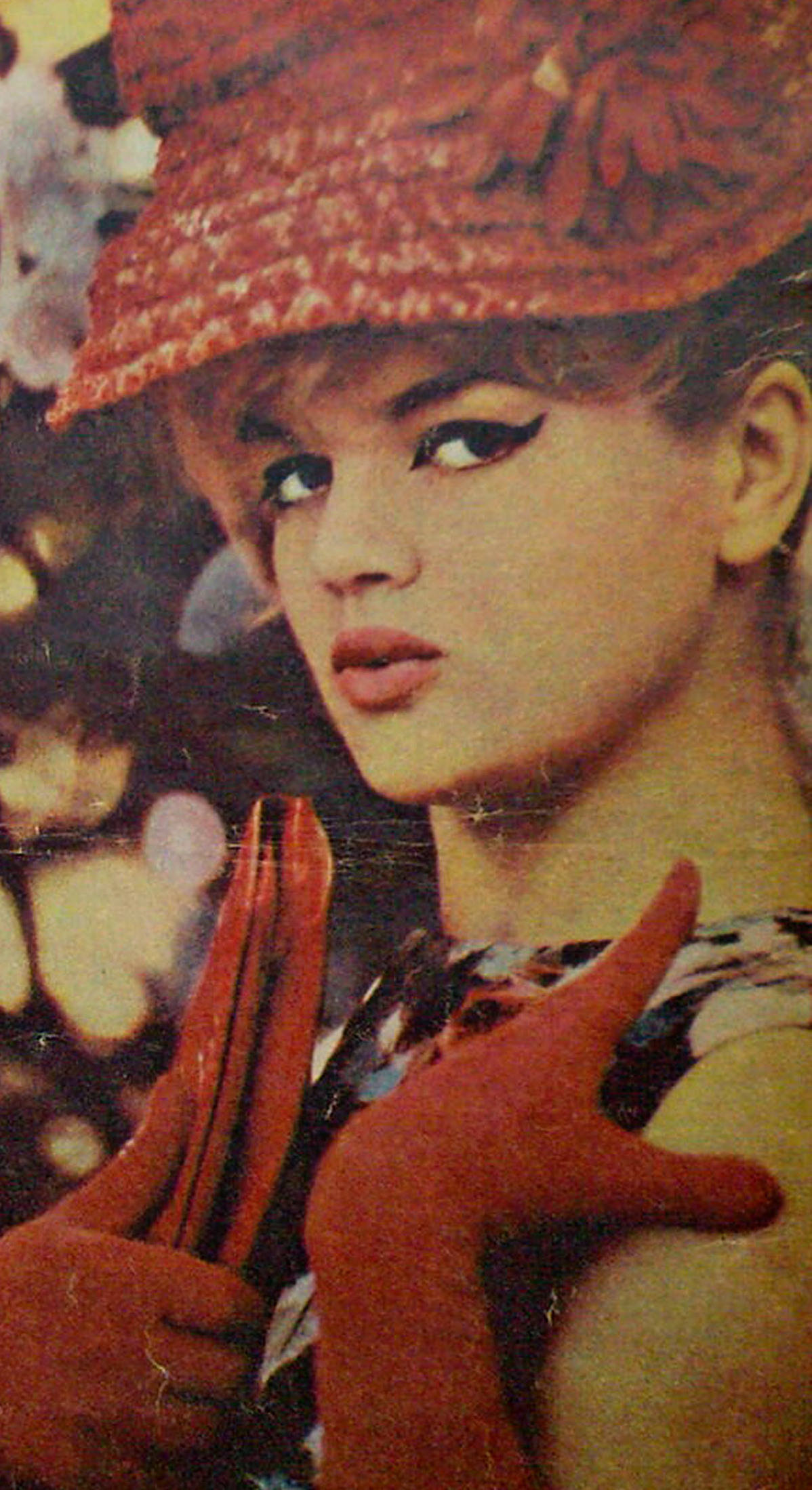
- Violetta Villas in 1967
- Born: Czesława Maria Cieślak; 10 June 1938; Heusy, Belgium
- Died: 5 December 2011 (aged 73); Lewin Kłodzki, Poland
- Other names: Violetta Élisa Cieślak (Catholic baptismal name)
- Occupations: singer, songwriter, composer, actress
- Years active: 1960–2011
- Spouse: Piotr Gospodarek (m. 1955; div. 1958) Harry Benjamin Malter (m. 1968; div. 1969) Ted Kowalczyk (m. 1988; div. 1988)
- Children: 1 (son)
- Musical career
- Genres: jazz; opera; operatic pop; revue; torch song; traditional pop
- Instruments: trombone; piano; violin; vocals
- Labels: Polskie Nagrania "Muza"; Pronit; Tonpress; Melodia Records Co; Polton; GM Distribution; EMI Music Poland; Accord Song; Jorge Studio; PHU Violetta

Violetta Villas (born Czesława Maria Cieślak; 10 June 1938 – 5 December 2011) was a Polish and international cabaret star, stage performer, singer, film, theatre and revue actress, composer and lyricist. Her repertoire encompassed popular songs, opera and operetta.

Her voice was described as a spinto sportano with an unusually wide range. She was also credited with absolute pitch and played the piano, trombone and violin. She was regarded as one of Poland's most recognisable stage singers. French and American publications referred to her as the "voice of the atomic age" and a "rare bird of world singing".

During her career, Villas released eight studio albums, one live album, eight extended plays and 27 singles. Her repertoire included several hundred songs in ten languages: Polish, English, French, German, Italian, Spanish, Russian, Portuguese, Neapolitan and Latin. Primarily associated with traditional pop, she also performed jazz and popular standards, film music, sung poetry, dramatic songs, opera and operetta arias, tangos, sacred music. She used vocalises to display the full extent of her range. Her songs were composed by musicians including Władysław Szpilman, Bogusław Klimczuk, Zbigniew Ciechan and Wojciech Kilar.

Villas spoke multiple languages; she was fluent in Polish, French and Russian and also spoke German and Walloon. She was made an honorary citizen of Lewin Kłodzki and New Britain, Connecticut.

== Biography ==
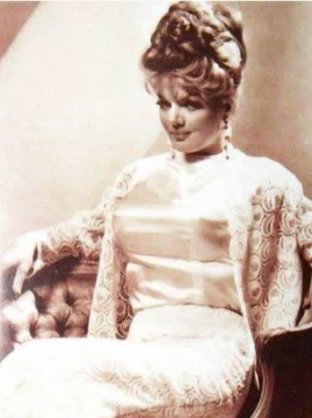
Violetta Villas in Las Vegas, 1967

=== Early life ===
Villas was born in Heusy, Liège province, the third of four children. She spent her childhood in Belgium. Her father, Bolesław Cieślak (4 December 1907 – 9 May 1960), was a miner and bandmaster, and her mother, Jane (26 January 1914 – 17 February 1985), was a housewife. In 1948 she moved to Poland with her parents and settled in Lewin Kłodzki, where she began studying music. She played the piano and violin in her youth.

In 1956 she began studying solo singing at the State Musical High School in Szczecin. She continued her artistic education in Wrocław with professor Gisela Posh. In 1959 she began classical vocal lessons with professor Eugenia Falkowska in Warsaw.

=== 1960–1965: Early career ===
In 1960, Villas made her debut on Polskie Radio at the invitation of its director of music, Władysław Szpilman. Her first broadcast songs were "Gdy zakwitną czereśnie" and "Ja nie mogę tamtej drugiej znieść". She recorded her first album, Rendez-vous with Violetta Villas, in 1962. She received her first noteworthy prize at the Sopot Festival in 1961 and 1962. In 1964, 1965 and 1966 she performed at National Festival of Polish Song in Opole.

In the early 1960s, Villas toured many countries in Europe, including Germany, Belgium, Switzerland, Spain, Russia, Czechoslovakia, Bulgaria and Romania, as well as in the United States, Canada and Israel.

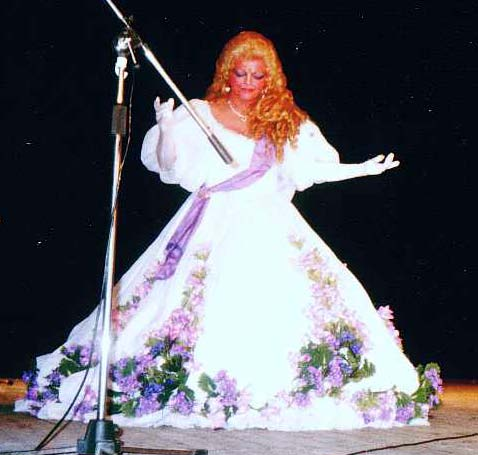
Villas in Christian Dior crinoline

In 1964 at the National Festival of Polish Song in Opole, Bruno Coquatrix invited her to France. At the 3rd Festival International des Variétés et Music-Halls in Rennes, Villas received her Grand Prix International d'Interpretation (she sang including Ave Maria). In 1965, she performed at the Fontaine Theatre (show Roue de la Chance, director André Chanu). In 1966, at a personal request of Bruno Cocquatrix, Villas appeared in the Grand Music Hall de Varsovie, revue program at Olympia. The premiere was 26 July 1966. Villas sang including Ave Maria no Morro and Hiroshima Mon Amour. In Paris she was approached by Frederic Apcar, who invited her to Las Vegas.

=== 1966–1970: Las Vegas and Casino de Paris ===
In December 1966 Villas performed at the Casino de Paris at Dunes Hotel & Casino. In her first program she sang including "Under Paris Skies", "Granada", "O Sole Mio", "Strangers in the Night" and "Libiamo ne' lieti calici". Villas sang in duets with Frank Sinatra, Paul Anka, Barbra Streisand, Charles Aznavour, Sammy Davis Jr., Eartha Kitt, and Dean Martin.

Her personal stylist was Patrick Valette, a Frenchman from fashion house Dior. She performed her show with a hundred-person French ballet. She lived in a villa with private swimming pool. In late '60s Villas recorded twenty songs for American television and Capitol Records. In March 1968 began a screen test for MGM film studio, where she was later signed to a movie contract.

=== 1971–1987: Isolation and comeback ===
Villas was offered a lucrative eight-year contract with Paramount Pictures but turned it down because of her mother's illness, which saw her return to Poland. The Polish Communist authorities confiscated her passport, which confined her in Poland for over a decade. However, she was not completely banned from the media and was able to pursue her career locally. In 1985, she made a comeback, just a few years after martial law ended, in a series of sold-out performances. Authorities returned her passport, and she resumed her international career. She later toured the US and Australia.

In 1987 she went on the tour "Violetta" in the United States and Canada. The premiere was 14 September at Carnegie Hall, where she received a standing ovation. In New York her concert was sold out. Villas performed in Las Vegas, Denver, Miami, Texas, Montreal and Chicago.

== Theatre ==
Before Villas started her theatre career in Poland, she performed in international revue shows in France and United States. In 1978 she played at the Grand Theatre in Łódź in the musical show Kochajmy się. In the 1970s/80s Villas was a star of the Siren Theatre in Warsaw. Villas played several roles in her theatre career, including Lygia in Trzeci program (The third programme, 1978) and the main role in the revue Violetta (1986–1988). In 1986 she returned to theatre, performing in Violetta with an orchestra and ballet.

In 1992, Villas played in the musical Hello, Dolly! at Kraków Operetta House. In the 1990s she performed at Warsaw Operetta House in her own programme, The Violetta Villas Show.

== Personal life ==
In 1954, when she was 16, Villas married lieutenant Gospodarek but they divorced just two years later in September 1956. Her parents had pressured her into the marriage but she did not truly love him. She left her husband to study music in Szczecin. They had one child, Krzysztof Gospodarek. In 1967 she married Harry B. Malter, an American businessman and entrepreneur. They were divorced several years later.

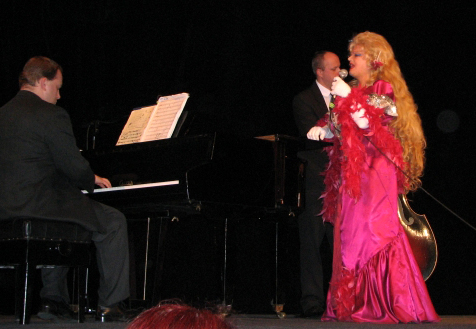
Villas recital

In 1987 she met an American businessman and millionaire of Polish descent, Ted Kowalczyk, and married him on 6 January 1988 in Chicago. The wedding ceremony was held at a banquet room of the "Orbit" Restaurant, a fixture of Chicago's Polish Village. They divorced in December 1988. He gave many interviews in the media about their marriage, but she said on a TV show "I made an error, that I believed so fast."

Villas struggled with alcohol and morphine addiction, according to her estranged son. Apparently, according to a show on Polish national public television, Villas suffered from delusional disorder for years, which strained her relationship with family and friends.

From 1968 to 1973 she provided information about her show business colleagues to the Security Service of the Ministry of Internal Affairs informant under the code name Gabriella.

Villas died on 5 December 2011 in Lewin Kłodzki at the age of 73.

== Discography ==
=== Studio albums ===
- 1962 Rendez-vous with Violetta Villas
- 1966 Violetta Villas
- 1967 Violetta Villas (reissue)
- 1968 For you my darling
- 1968 About Love...
- 1977 There is no love without jealousy
- 1985 Las Vegas
- 1986 Violetta Villas (reissue)
- 1992 The most beautiful Christmas carols
- 1996 Daddy 2 guest star
- 1997 Christmas carols
- 1997 Villas sings Christmas carols
- 2001 When Jesus Christus was born...
- 2001 Violetta Villas (reissue)
- 2001 There is no love without jealousy (reissue)
- 2001 For you my darling (reissue)
- 2003 Valentine hits
- 2004 Christmas carols from heart
- 2008 To comfort the heart and warmth the soul
- 2009 The most beautiful Christmas carols (reissue)

=== Live ===
- 1994 Dolly
- 1994 I am what I am (reissue)
- 1998 Dolly (reissue)
- 2006 I am what I am (reissue)

=== Singles ===
- 1961 "I don't believe you"
- 1961 "Such a frost"
- 1961 "I don't make it"
- 1961 "For you my darling"
- 1961 "Red Marianna"
- 1961 "Secret"
- 1962 "Get married, Johny!"
- 1962 "Cuckoo clock"
- 1962 "It speak maracas"
- 1962 "Look straight into my eyes"
- 1962 "When Allah goes"
- 1962 "Ali alo"
- 1963 "Fan"
- 1964 "To you, mother"
- 1964 "Joseph"
- 1964 "The love begins with a smile"
- 1964 "There is a time for love"
- 1964 "Is not"
- 1966 "To you, mother"
- 1978 "For mum"
- 1986 "Mundial '86"
- 1987 "The pine from my dream"
- 1987 "Take me from Barcelona"
- 1987 "Everywhere you go"
- 1987 "The wild woman"

=== Flexi discs ===
- 1962 Do you like to dance?
- 1964 There is a time for love
- 1964 Forty chesnut-trees
- 1964 Recalling Masuria
- 1965 Mamma
- 1965 I will travel to you
- 1965 To you, mother
- 1968 It's raining in Zakopane
- 1970 I returned to you
- 1972 There is no love without jealousy
- 1974 To you, mother

=== Compilation albums ===
- 1980 Old hits
- 1987 The greatest hits
- 1992 For you my darling
- 1992 The best of
- 1995 Violetta Villas – gold hits
- 1996 Gold hits
- 1996 Only to you
- 1997 I am what I am
- 1998 Platinum collection
- 2000 Gold hits
- 2003 To you, mother
- 2003 Magic memories
- 2009 From the Polish Radio archive
- 2010 40 Violetta Villas songs
- and 46 Various Artists-type compilations

== Filmography ==
Movie

- 1969 How to commit marriage
- 1969 Heaven with a gun
- 1969 Paint your wagon
- 1970 Dzięcioł (The Woodpecker)
- 1983 Dream about Violetta
- 1989 Violetta Villas

Television

- 1963 Revue of the Polskie Nagrania
- 1964 Dancing Joe
- 1965 Roue de la chance
- 1966 Professor Tutka's club
- 1970 Violetta Villas sings
- 1975 The wedding
- 1977 Sentiments
- 1978 Good evening, it's Łódź!
- 1985 Summer Studio
- 1985 Beautiful and excellent
- 1988 Violetta
- 1993 Violetta Villas show – live at Warsaw Operetta
- 1995 Only to You
- 1996 Concert on a barge
- 1999 Violetta V. – live

== Repertoire ==
1. Song festivals – Sopot, Opole, Knokke-Heist, Basel etc. (1961–1964)

- "Ave Maria no Morro"
- "For You My Darling"
- "Look Straight into My Eyes"
- "Si señor"
- "The Time Will Come"
- "To You, Mother"

2. "Roue de la chance", Theatre Fontaine in Paris (1965)

- "Ave Maria no Morro"
- "Look Straight into my Eyes"

3. "Grand music hall de Varsovie", Olympia in Paris (1966)

- "Ave Maria no Morro"
- "Hiroshima Mon Amour"
- "Look Straight into my Eyes"
- "Non C'est Rien"

4. "Casino de Paris", Dunes in Las Vegas (1967–1969)

- "Ave Maria no Morro"
- "C'est si bon"
- "Dark Eyes"
- "Et Maintenant"
- "Gounod's Ave Maria"
- "Free Again"
- "Granada"
- "Hello, Dolly!"
- "I Will Wait for You"
- "L'amour Est Un Oiseau Rebelle"
- "Libiamo ne' lieti calici"
- "My Heart Belongs to Daddy"
- "Ne me quitte pas"
- "O sole mio"
- "Somewhere My Love"
- "Strangers in the Night"
- "Un bel dì vedremo"
- "Under Paris Skies"
- "Under the Bridges of Paris"
- "This Is My Song"
- "Vissi d'arte"
- "What Now My Love"

5. "Villas Revue", Congress Hall in Warsaw (1968)

- "Dark Eyes"
- "Hello, Dolly!"
- "L'amour Est Un Oiseau Rebelle"
- "Libiamo ne' Lieti Calici"
- "My Heart Belongs to Daddy"
- "Strangers in the Night"
- "This Is My Song"

6. "Violetta", international concert tour started at Carnegie Hall in New York (1987–1988)

- Arias from "Carmen"
- "Dark Eyes"
- "Granada"
- "Happiness" (Polish – "Szczęście")
- "If You Go Away"
- "Kiss me hotly" (Polish – "Całuj gorąco")
- "Mechanical doll" (Polish – "Mechaniczna lalka")
- "Strangers in the Night"
- "Summertime"
- "Violetta"
