= Jawornica =

Jawornica may refer to the following places in Poland:

- Jawornica, Lower Silesian Voivodeship (south-west Poland)
- Jawornica, Silesian Voivodeship (south Poland)
