= Farma season 17 =

Farma
- Season 17
- Presented by: Marek Fašiang
- No. of days: 75
- No. of castaways: 23
- Winner: Roman Perašín
- Runners-up: Richard Fabšič; Róbert Hudák
- Location: Slovakia

Release
- Original network: Markíza
- Original release: September 1 – December 14, 2025

Season chronology
- ← Previous; Season 16 Next → Season 18

Farma 17 (The Farm 17) is the seventeenth season of the Slovak reality television series Farma. The season has 16 Slovaks compete on and live on a farm how it was a century prior, competing in tasks, challenges and duels to earn prizes and maintain survival in the game to try and win €100,000. The season is presented once again by Marek Fašiang alongside the farm mentor Martin Bagár. The season premiered on Markíza on 1 September 2025.

== Contestants ==
Notable contestants includes The Bachelor contestant Michaela Doležalová.

Contestant	Age	Background	Residence	Day Entered	Day Exited	Status	Finish
Arseni Ivakhnou	23	Fortune Teller	Bratislava	Day 1	Day 5	1st Evicted; Day 5	23rd
Július Šandor	37	Influencer	Trnava	Day 1	Day 10	Quit; Day 10	22nd
Peter Tirpák	42	Farmer	Snina	Day 1	Day 11	Medically evacuated Day 11	21st
Marcela Gregorová	52	Sales Manager	Banská Bystrica	Day 1	Day 15	2nd Evicted; Day 15	20th
Štefan Tomeček	30	Solar Panel Installer	Motešice	Day 16	Day 20	3rd Evicted; Day 20	19th
Lucia Škurla	33	Maternity leave	Rimavská Sobota	Day 1	Day 25	4th Evicted; Day 25	18th
Michaela Doležalová	25	Influencer, Businesswoman	Trenčín	Day 1	Day 30	5th Evicted; Day 30	17th
Emília Grmanová	37	Marketing Specialist	Trnava	Day 1	Day 38	Eliminated; Day 38	16th
Annabelle Fárová	38	Presenter	Prague, Czech Republic	Day 33	Day 40	Medically evacuated Day 40	15th
Ján Škoda	28	Marketing Agency Owner	Bratislava	Day 33	Day 47	Medically evacuated Day 47	14th
Marián Hanousek	25	Electrician	Trnava	Day 1	Day 50	8th Evicted; Day 50	13th
Sofia Úporská	24	Waitress	Spišský Štiavnik	Day 33	Day 55	9th Evicted; Day 55	12th
Igor Staňa	23	Self-employed	Spišské Podhradie	Day 1	Day 35	6th Evicted; Day 35	11th
Igor Staňa	23	Self-employed	Spišské Podhradie	Day 41	Day 58	Eliminated; Day 58	11th
Áron Erdélyi	25	Marketing Student	Bratislava	Day 1	Day 60	10th Evicted; Day 60	10th
Miloslav Miklošovič	25	Assembler	Košice	Day 16	Day 64	Eliminated; Day 64	9th
Dorota Androvičová	21	Nurse	Žilina	Day 1	Day 65	11th Evicted; Day 65	8th
Laura Žiačková	19	Student	Rajecká Lesná	Day 1	Day 70	12th Evicted; Day 70	7th
Alena Domániková	41	Dance Teacher	Prievidza	Day 1	Day 73	13th Evicted; Day 73	6th
Sarah Boříková	25	Pedicurist	Moldava nad Bodvou	Day 33	Day 73	14th Evicted; Day 73	5th
Ela Martinčeková	24	Dental Clinic Administrator	Košice	Day 1	Day 74	15th Evicted; Day 74	4th
Róbert Hudák	30	Farm Manager	Piešťany	Day 16	Day 75	2nd Runner-up; Day 75	3rd
Richard Fabšič	30	Personal Assistant	Bratislava	Day 1	Day 45	7th Evicted; Day 45	2nd
Richard Fabšič	30	Personal Assistant	Bratislava	Day 47	Day 75	Runner-up; Day 75	2nd
Roman Perašín	29	Car Mechanic	Beňadiková	Day 1	Day 75	Winner; Day 75	1st

== The game ==
Week	Farmer of the Week	Butlers	1st Dueler	2nd Dueler	Evicted	Finish
1	Richard	Arseni; Lucia	Arseni	Laura	Arseni	1st Evicted; Day 5
2	Lucia	Richard; Laura	Laura	Július	Július	Quit; Day 10
3	Roman	Áron; Emília	~~Áron~~ (Note: As Áron guessed who had the amulet for immunity, he was then immune and replaced by the holder of the amulet, Alena as a duelist.); Alena	Marcela	Peter	Medically evacuated Day 11
3	Roman	Áron; Emília	~~Áron~~; Alena	Marcela	Marcela	2nd Evicted; Day 15
4	Alena	Dorota; Áron; Miloslav	Miloslav	Štefan	Štefan	3rd Evicted; Day 20
5	Miloslav	Alena; Róbert	Róbert	Lucia	Lucia	4th Evicted; Day 25
6	Dorota	Emília; Michaela	Michaela	Miloslav	Michaela	5th Evicted; Day 30
7	Emília	Alena; Roman	Roman	Igor	Igor	6th Evicted; Day 35
8	Sofia	Alena; Roman	Alena	Sarah	Emília	Eliminated; Day 38 (Note: Emília tried to guess who held the Amulet of Salamander for the week, she guessed incorrectly and was eliminated.)
8	Sofia	Alena; Roman	Alena	Sarah	Annabelle	Medically evacuated Day 40
9	Sarah	Ela; Richard	Richard	Róbert	Richard	7th Evicted; Day 45
10	Ela	Igor; Laura	Laura	Marián	Ján	Medically evacuated Day 47
10	Ela	Igor; Laura	Laura	Marián	Marián	8th Evicted; Day 50
11	Igor	Dorota; Miloslav	Dorota	Sofia	Sofia	9th Evicted; Day 55
12	Sarah	Alena; Áron	Áron	Róbert	Igor	Eliminated; Day 58 (Note: Róbert correctly guessed that Igor was the holder of the Amulet of Salamander, as a result Igor was eliminated from the game.)
12	Sarah	Alena; Áron	Áron	Róbert	Áron	10th Evicted; Day 60
13	Laura	Dorota; Roman	Roman	Dorota	Miloslav	Eliminated; Day 64 (Note: Roman had to decide between Dorota and Miloslav for who he'd face in the duel, as Miloslav wasn't picked, he was eliminated.)
13	Laura	Dorota; Roman	Roman	Dorota	Dorota	11th Evicted; Day 65
14	Róbert	Laura; Roman	Laura	Richard	Laura	12th Evicted; Day 70
15	Elimination Week				Alena	13th Evicted; Day 73
15	Elimination Week				Sarah	14th Evicted; Day 73
15	Semi Final				Ela	15th Evicted; Day 74
15	Final Duel				Róbert	2nd Runner-up; Day 75
15	Final Duel				Richard	Runner-up; Day 75
15	Final Duel				Roman	Winner; Day 75
