= Kocioł =

Kocioł may refer to the following places in Poland:

- Kocioł, Lower Silesian Voivodeship (south-west Poland)
- Kocioł, Warmian-Masurian Voivodeship (north Poland)
