= Lesna =

Lesna may refer to places:

- Leśna, a town in Lower Silesian Voivodeship (south-west Poland)
- Lešná, a municipality and village in the Zlín Region, Czech Republic
- Leśna, Kłodzko County in Lower Silesian Voivodeship (south-west Poland)
- Leśna, Opole Voivodeship (south-west Poland)
- Leśna, Podlaskie Voivodeship (north-east Poland)
- Leśna, Żywiec County in Silesian Voivodeship (south Poland)
- Leśna, Świętokrzyskie Voivodeship (south-central Poland)
- Lesná (disambiguation), several villages in the Czech Republic and Slovakia
- Leśna, Polish name of Lyasnaya, Brest Region, town in Belarus
