= Gmina Lewin Kłodzki =

Gmina Lewin Kłodzki Lewin Kłodzki Commune
- Gmina
- Coat of arms
- Interactive map of Gmina Lewin Kłodzki
- Coordinates (Lewin Kłodzki): 50°25′N 16°17′E
- Country: Poland
- Voivodeship: Lower Silesian
- County: Kłodzko
- Seat: Lewin Kłodzki

Area
  - Total: 52.19 km^{2} (20.15 sq mi)

Population (2019-06-30)
  - Total: 1,940
  - Density: 37.2/km^{2} (96.3/sq mi)
- Website: http://www.lewin-klodzki.pl/

Gmina Lewin Kłodzki is a rural gmina (administrative district) in Kłodzko County, Lower Silesian Voivodeship, in south-western Poland. Its seat is the village of Lewin Kłodzki, which lies approximately 27 kilometres (17 mi) west of Kłodzko, and 96 kilometres (60 mi) south-west of the regional capital Wrocław.

The gmina covers an area of 52.19 square kilometres (20.2 sq mi), and as of 2019 its total population is 1,940.

== Neighbouring gminas ==
Gmina Lewin Kłodzki is bordered by the towns of Duszniki-Zdrój and Kudowa-Zdrój, and the gmina of Szczytna. It also borders the Czech Republic.

== Villages ==
The gmina contains the villages of Dańczów, Darnków, Gołaczów, Jarków, Jawornica, Jeleniów, Jerzykowice Małe, Jerzykowice Wielkie, Kocioł, Krzyżanów, Kulin Kłodzki, Leśna, Lewin Kłodzki, Ludowe, Taszów, Witów, Zielone and Zimne Wody.

== Twin towns – sister cities ==
Gmina Lewin Kłodzki is twinned with:

- Olešnice v Orlických horách, Czech Republic
