= Witów, Lower Silesian Voivodeship =

Witów
- Village
- Location within Poland
- Coordinates: 50°24′6″N 16°19′42″E
- Country: Poland
- Voivodeship: Lower Silesian
- County: Kłodzko
- Gmina: Lewin Kłodzki
- Highest elevation: 600 m (2,000 ft)

Population
  - Total: 16

Witów [ˈvituf] is a village in the administrative district of Gmina Lewin Kłodzki, within Kłodzko County, Lower Silesian Voivodeship, in south-western Poland.
