= Jarków =

- Village
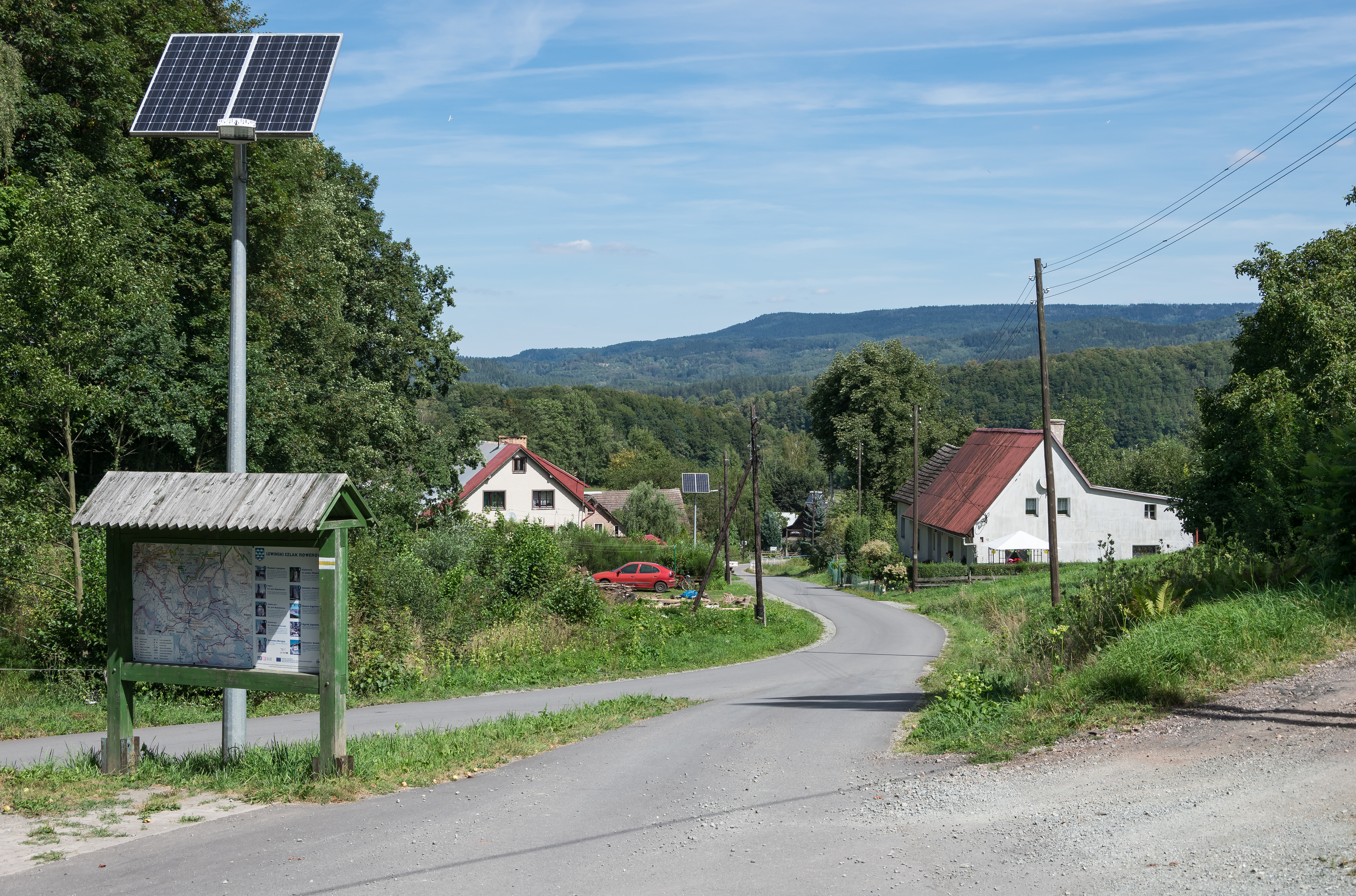

- Location within Poland
- Coordinates: 50°24′07″N 16°15′55″E
- Country: Poland
- Voivodeship: Lower Silesian
- County: Kłodzko
- Gmina: Lewin Kłodzki

Jarków [ˈjarkuf] is a village in the administrative district of Gmina Lewin Kłodzki, within Kłodzko County, Lower Silesian Voivodeship, in south-western Poland.
