= Jerzykowice Wielkie =

- Village
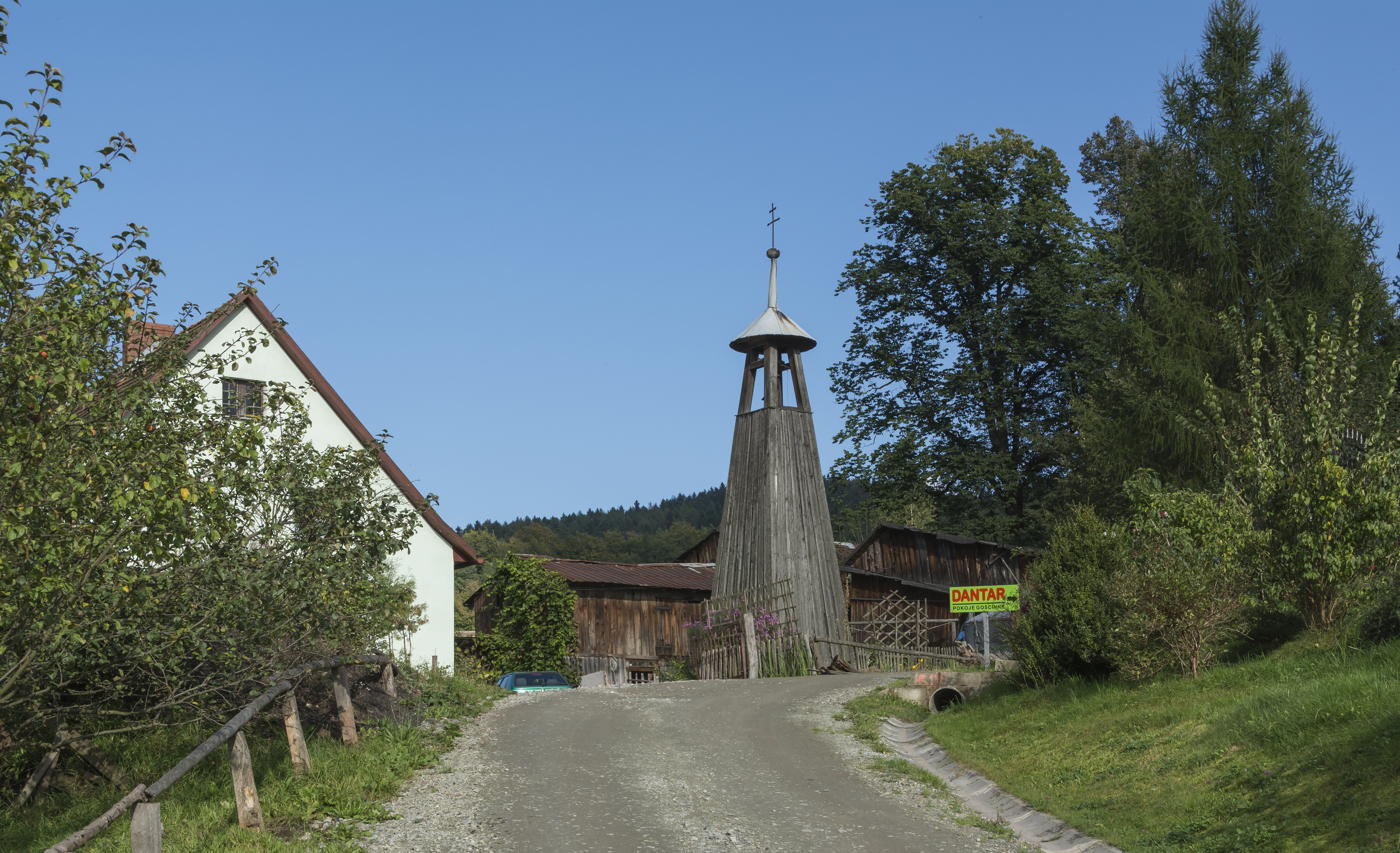
- Belfry in the village

- Location within Poland
- Coordinates: 50°26′10″N 16°16′12″E
- Country: Poland
- Voivodeship: Lower Silesian
- County: Kłodzko
- Gmina: Lewin Kłodzki
- Population: 80

Jerzykowice Wielkie [jɛʐɨkɔˈvit͡sɛ ˈvjɛlkʲɛ] is a village in the administrative district of Gmina Lewin Kłodzki, within Kłodzko County, Lower Silesian Voivodeship, in south-western Poland.. As of the 2021 census, it had a population of 106, up from 95 in 2011.
