= Zimne Wody =

- Village
- Location within Poland
- Coordinates: 50°23′09″N 16°19′58″E
- Country: Poland
- Voivodeship: Lower Silesian
- County: Kłodzko
- Gmina: Lewin Kłodzki
- Highest elevation: 630 m (2,070 ft)

Zimne Wody [ˈʑimnɛ ˈvɔdɨ] is a village in the administrative district of Gmina Lewin Kłodzki, within Kłodzko County, Lower Silesian Voivodeship, in south-western Poland.
