= Farma season 18 =

Farma
- Season 18
- Presented by: Marek Fašiang
- No. of castaways: 21
- Location: Doľany, Slovakia

Release
- Original network: Markíza
- Original release: September 7, 2026 – December 2026

Season chronology
- ← Previous; Season 17

Farma 18 (The Farm 18) is the eighteenth season of the Slovak reality television series Farma. At the beginning, the season has 14 Slovaks compete on and live on a farm how it was a century prior, competing in tasks, challenges and duels to earn prizes and maintain survival in the game to try and win €100,000. This season theme is winemaking, contestants are tasked to save an old vineyard and produce their own wine. The Farm is located in the Little Carpathian Wine Region. The season is presented once again by Marek Fašiang alongside the farm mentor Martin Bagár with his help the winemaker Tomáš Dudo. The season premieres on Markíza on 7 September 2026..

== Contestants ==
Notable contestants includes The Bachelor contestant Mercedes Gálisová.

Contestant	Age	Background	Residence	Day Entered	Day Exited	Status	Finish
Silvia Dúhová	49	Unemployed	Liptovský Mikuláš	Day 1	Day 5	1st Evicted; Day 5	21st
Linda Rollo	23	Nurse	Bratislava	Day 1	Day 10	2nd Evicted; Day 10	20th
Patrik Ševčík	33	Wastewater Treatment Plant Manager	Modrovka	Day 1	Day 14	Quit; Day 14	19th
Timotej "Nino" Kalinka	24	Unemployed	Martin	Day 6	Day 17	Ejected; Day 17	18th
Hugo Zaťkov	25	Warehouse Worker	Krupina	Day 1	Day 20	3rd Evicted; Day 20	17th
Ľubomír Ďaďo	51	Retiree	Ružomberok	Day 6	Day 25	4th Evicted; Day 25	16th
Vivien Idesová	22	Beautician	Zvolen	Day 6	Day 30	5th Evicted; Day 30	15th
Tatiana Kaločaiová	37	Economist	Bratislava	Day 1	Day 35	6th Evicted; Day 35	14th
Martin Juraško	39	Self-employed	Prešov	Day 1	Day 35	Ejected; Day 35	13th
Jakub Krška	32	Manager at a Vegetable Farm	Denmark	Day 1	Day 35	Ejected; Day 35	12th
Mirec Sochuľák	40	Entrepreneur	Ťapešovo	Day 36	Day 45	7th Evicted; Day 45	11th
Juraj "Ďuri" Halaška	36	Self-employed in Forestry Services	Prievidza	Day 1	Day 50	8th Evicted; Day 50	10th
Jessica Romaniaková	23	Sales Assistant	Bratislava	Day 36	Day 55	9th Evicted; Day 55	9th
Barbora Turčiaková	21	Nursing Student and Football Referee	Ľubeľa	Day 1			
Jaroslav Konštiak	28	Electrician	Terchová	Day 1			
Juraj Chlpek	27	Barbershop Owner	Malacky	Day 1			
Katarína "Blessing" Megyaszaová	22	Salon Manager	Bratislava	Day 1			
Mercedes "Merci" Gálisová	28	Hair Salon Owner	Bratislava	Day 1			
Michal Sagula	31	Assembler Worker	Bratislava	Day 36			
Silvia Pechová	26	Maid	Ružomberok	Day 1			
Tanja Mohidin	24	Tatoo Artist	Žilina	Day 36			

== The game ==
Week	Farmer of the Week	Butlers	1st Dueler	2nd Dueler	Evicted	Finish
1	Patrik	Jaroslav; Silvia D.	Silvia D.	Blessing	Silvia D.	1st Evicted; Day 5
2	Tatiana	Jakub; Vivien	Vivien	Linda	Linda	2nd Evicted; Day 10
3	Barbora	Nino; Blessing	Nino	Tatiana	Patrik	Quit; Day 15
4	~~Nino~~; Martin	Jakub; Juraj CH.	Jakub	Hugo	Nino	Quit; Day 17
4	~~Nino~~; Martin	Jakub; Juraj CH.	Jakub	Hugo	Hugo	3rd Evicted; Day 20
5	Juraj H.	Martin; Mercedes	Martin	Ľubomír	Ľubomír	4th Evicted; Day 25
6	Tatiana	Vivien; Mercedes	Vivien	Jaroslav	Vivien	5th Evicted; Day 30
7	Mercedes	Tatiana; Blessing	Tatiana	Jaroslav	Tatiana	6th Evicted; Day 35
