= Farma season 15 =

Farma
- Season 15
- Presented by: Marek Fašiang
- No. of days: 75
- No. of castaways: 19
- Winner: Lucia Gašparíková
- Runners-up: Nikola Škrvaňová; Denis Čatlóš
- Location: Hubina, Slovakia

Release
- Original network: Markíza
- Original release: September 4 – December 17, 2023

Season chronology
- ← Previous; Season 14 Next → Season 16

Farma 15 (The Farm 15) is the fifteenth season of the Slovak reality television series Farma. This season goes back to the regular format of the show where 15 ordinary Slovaks live on a farm like it was a century ago and complete tasks for the farm mentor to try and win €75,000. The main twist this season is that contestants are divided up into three teams, corresponding to the generation they belong to, Generation Z, Generation Y and Generation X. The season is presented by Marek Fašiang and premieres on 4 September 2023 on Markíza.

== Nomination process ==
The Farmer of the Week nominates two people (a man and a woman) as the Butlers. The others must decide which Butler is the first to go to the Battle. That person then chooses the second person (from the same sex) for the Battle and also the type of battle (a quiz, extrusion, endurance, sleight). The Battle winner must win two duels. The Battle loser is evicted from the game.

Ages stated are at time of contest.

Contestant	Age	Background	Residence	Starting team	Day Entered	Status	Finish
Michal Mičina	20	Student	Topoľčany	Gen Z	Day 1	1st Evicted; Day 5	19th
Daniel Kňažík	25	Technical Analyst	Bratislava	Gen Y	Day 1	2nd Evicted; Day 10	18th
Marek Mikuš	29	Chief State Councillor	Detva	Gen Y	Day 1	3rd Evicted; Day 15	17th
Dominika Hrivňáková	26	Hotel Receptionist	Lučenec	Gen Y	Day 23	5th Evicted; Day 30	16th
Miroslav Mimochodek	38	Power Plant Designer	Uherské Hradiště, Czech Republic	Gen X	Day 1	Medically Evacuated; Day 33	15th
Roman Záležák	39	Entrepreneur	Štúrovo	Gen X	Day 1	4th Evicted; Day 20	14th
Roman Záležák	39	Entrepreneur	Štúrovo	Gen X	Day 24	6th Evicted; Day 35	14th
Sára Vrablecová	30	Beautician	Gajary	Gen Y	Day 1	Medically evacuated Day 42	13th
Timotej Puchoň	22	Photographer, Musician	Cífer	Gen Z	Day 1	8th Evicted; Day 45	12th
Sofia Babylonská	24	Poker Dealer	Prešov	Gen Z	Day 1	9th Evicted; Day 50	11th
Peter Kandra	24	Unemployed	Banská Bystrica	Gen Z	Day 38	10th Evicted; Day 55	10th
Viktória "Viki" Trikis Várošová	27	Tour Guide	Tena, Ecuador	Gen Y	Day 38	11th Evicted; Day 60	9th
Adam Rohárik	41	Farmer	Revúca	Gen X	Day 1	Left Competition; Day 62	8th
Matúš Smreček	27	Graphic Designer	Košice	Gen Y	Day 23	12th Evicted; Day 70	7th
Azra Sokira	19	High School Student	Bratislava	Gen Z	Day 1	13th Evicted; Day 72	6th
Ema Minarovjech	21	Waitress	Bratislava	Gen Z	Day 1	14th Evicted; Day 73	5th
Miroslava Bartáková Kozárová	40	Mint Worker	Kremnické Bane	Gen X	Day 1	15th Evicted; Day 74	4th
Denis Čatlóš	29	Photographer	Bratislava	Gen Y	Day 1	7th Evicted; Day 40	3rd
Denis Čatlóš	29	Photographer	Bratislava	Gen Y	Day 43	2nd Runner-up; Day 75	3rd
Nikola Škrvaňová	27	Bartender	Slovenská Ľupča	Gen Y	Day 1	Runner-up; Day 75	2nd
Lucia Gašparíková	40	Fitness Trainer	Tovarníky	Gen X	Day 1	Winner; Day 75	1st

== The game ==
Week	Farmer of the Week	Butlers	1st Dueler	2nd Dueler	Evicted	Finish
1	Daniel	Michal; Miroslava	Michal	Sofia	Michal	1st Evicted; Day 5
2	Azra	Lucia; Sára	Sára	Daniel	Daniel	2nd Evicted; Day 10
3	Nikola	Azra; Denis	Sára	Marek	Marek	3rd Evicted; Day 15
4	Denis	Ema; Miroslava	Roman	Miroslav	Roman	4th Evicted; Day 20
5	Miroslava	Azra; Nikola	Matúš	Dominika	Dominika	Saved; Day 25
6	Matúš	Nikola; Roman	Nikola	Dominika	Dominika	5th Evicted; Day 30
7	Adam	Lucia; Timotej	Miroslava	Roman	Miroslav	Medically Evacuated; Day 33
7	Adam	Lucia; Timotej	Miroslava	Roman	Roman	6th Evicted; Day 35
8	Sára	Azra; Lucia	Nikola	Denis	Denis	7th Evicted; Day 40
9	Lucia	Nikola; ~~Sára~~ (Note: As Sára was Medically evacuated from the Farm. Lucia, as the head of the Farm had to choose a new butler. She chose Viki.); Viki	Peter	Timotej	Sára	Medically evacuated Day 43
9	Lucia	Nikola; ~~Sára~~; Viki	Peter	Timotej	Timotej	8th Evicted; Day 45
10	Ema	Matus; Miroslava	Miroslava	Sofia	Sofia	9th Evicted; Day 50
11	Miroslava	Ema; Peter	Peter	Denis	Peter	10th Evicted; Day 55
12	Denis	Azra; Matúš	Nikola	Viki	Viki	11th Evicted; Day 60
13	Nikola	Denis; Ema	Lucia	Denis	Adam	Left Competition; Day 62
13	Nikola	Denis; Ema	Lucia	Denis	Denis	Won Duel; Head of Farm; Day 65
14	Denis	Matúš; Nikola	Matúš	Nikola	Matúš	12th Evicted; Day 70
15	Elimination Week				Azra	13th Evicted; Day 72
15	Elimination Week				Ema	14th Evicted; Day 73
15	Semi Final				Miroslava	15th Evicted; Day 74
15	Final Duel				Denis	2nd Runner-up; Day 75
15	Final Duel				Nikola	Runner-up; Day 75
15	Final Duel				Lucia	Winner; Day 75
