= Farma season 16 =

Season of television series

Farma
- Season 16
- Presented by: Marek Fašiang
- No. of days: 75
- No. of castaways: 21
- Winner: Peter Janiga
- Runners-up: Matúš Horváth; Hoku Kamaaina Nezdoba
- Location: Modrová, Slovakia

Release
- Original network: Markíza
- Original release: September 2 – December 15, 2024

Season chronology
- ← Previous; Season 15 Next → Season 17

Farma 16 (The Farm 16) is the sixteenth season of the Slovak reality television series Farma. This season goes back to the regular format of the show where 17 ordinary Slovaks live on a farm like it was a century ago and complete tasks for the farm mentor to try and win €100,000. The main twist this season is that four contestants from previous seasons are coming back, living close to the farm and have a secret mission that must not be revealed. The season premiered on 2 September 2024 on Markíza.

== Nomination process ==
The Farmer of the Week divides people into two groups, one group lives in better conditions, the other group lives in worse conditions in a barn with animals. Each group chooses one butler from among themselves. Groups compete with each other in tasks for immunity diamonds, the butler from the losing group becomes the first duelist and must choose the second duelist from his group. The Battle winner must win three duels. The Battle loser is evicted from the game.

=== Contestants ===
Ages stated are at time of contest.

| Contestant | Age | Background | Residence | Day Entered | Status | Finish |
|---|---|---|---|---|---|---|
| Ella Kruželáková | 18 | High School Student | Košice | Day 1 | 1st Evicted; Day 10 | 21st |
| Sandra Benková | 34 | Lifestyle and Wellness Worker | London, United Kingdom | Day 1 | 2nd Evicted; Day 15 | 20th |
| Ján Stauder | 30 | Fast Food Manager | Bratislava | Day 1 | 3rd Evicted; Day 20 | 19th |
| Minh Nguyen Anh | 22 | Nail Stylist | Bratislava | Day 1 | 4th Evicted; Day 25 | 18th |
| Ivana Koháková | 46 | Bartender | Prague, Czech Republic | Day 1 | 5th Evicted; Day 30 | 17th |
| Karin Hegedüs Dvořáková | 31 | Influencer | Košice | Day 1 | Quit; Day 35 | 16th |
| Michaela Budayová | 30 | Shop Assistant | Košice | Day 32 | 6th Evicted; Day 40 | 15th |
| Roman Hraňo | 28 | Farmer | Maršová-Rašov | Day 32 | 7th Evicted; Day 45 | 14th |
| Matej Hrušovský | 22 | Entrepreneur | Spišská Nová Ves | Day 1 | 8th Evicted; Day 50 | 13th |
| Veronika Tomanová | 34 | Animal Nurse | Piešťany | Day 1 | 9th Evicted; Day 55 | 12th |
| Andrej Brzáč | 39 | High-altitude Worker | Prievidza | Day 1 | Quit; Day 58 | 11th |
| Norbert Waldhauser | 28 | Barber | Šaštín-Stráže | Day 32 | Medically evacuated Day 60 | 10th |
| Lenka Tejbusová | 23 | Influencer | Bratislava | Day 1 | 10th Evicted; Day 65 | 9th |
| Karolína Jarabeková | 25 | Dealer | Banská Štiavnica | Day 1 | 11th Evicted; Day 69 | 8th |
| Adam Rohárik | 43 | Farmer | Revúca | Day 1 | 12th Evicted; Day 70 | 7th |
| Klára Belošicová | 23 | Dancer | Prievidza | Day 1 | 13th Evicted; Day 70 | 6th |
| Stanislava Klčová | 26 | Professional Animator | Čachtice | Day 1 | 14th Evicted; Day 73 | 5th |
| Lucy Michalička | 25 | Student | Žilina | Day 32 | 15th Evicted; Day 74 | 4th |
| Hoku Kamaaina Nezdoba | 50 | Nomad | Turiec | Day 1 | 2nd Runner-up; Day 75 | 3th |
| Matúš Horváth | 23 | Tattoo Artist | Košice | Day 1 | Runner-up; Day 75 | 2nd |
| Peter Janiga | 33 | Dancer and Teacher | Prešov | Day 1 | Winner; Day 75 | 1st |

== The game ==
| Week | Farmer of the Week | Butlers | 1st Dueler | 2nd Dueler | Evicted | Finish |
|---|---|---|---|---|---|---|
| 1 | Peter | Ella; Ján | Ella | Sandra | Ella | Saved; Day 5 (Note: After losing the duel, Ella joined the secret farmers (former contestants) to help them with their mission for a chance to enter and rejoin the farm.) |
| 2 | Ján | Lenka; Matej | Lenka | Ella | Ella | 1st Evicted; Day 10 |
| 3 | Matúš | Ján; Sandra | Sandra | Andrej | Sandra | 2nd Evicted; Day 15 |
| 4 | Hoku | Ján; Karolína | Ján | Veronika | Ján | 3rd Evicted; Day 20 |
| 5 | Ivana | Klára; Veronika | Klára | Minh | Minh | 4th Evicted; Day 25 |
| 6 | Karin | Ivana; Stanislava | Ivana | Karolina | Ivana | 5th Evicted; Day 30 |
| 7 | Peter | Karin; Veronika | Karin | Lenka | Karin | Quit; Day 35 |
| 8 | Lenka | Lucy; Matej | Lucy | Michaela | Michaela | 6th Evicted; Day 40 |
| 9 | None (Note: This week as part of a twist, no one was elected as the Head of the Farm.) | Roman; Lenka | Roman | Andrej | Roman | 7th Evicted; Day 45 |
| 10 | Lucy | Adam; Veronika | Adam | Matej | Matej | 8th Evicted; Day 50 |
| 11 | Klára | Peter; Stanislava | Veronika | Lucy | Veronika | 9th Evicted; Day 55 |
| 12 | Stanislava | Norbert; Karolina | Norbert | Adam | Andrej | Quit; Day 58 |
| 12 | Stanislava | Norbert; Karolina | Norbert | Adam | Norbert | Medically evacuated Day 60 |
| 13 | Matúš | Lucy; Hoku | Hoku | Lenka | Lenka | 10th Evicted; Day 65 |
| 14 | Matúš | Adam; Peter | Lucy | Karolina | Karolina | 11th Evicted; Day 69 |
| 14 | Matúš | Adam; Peter | Adam | Peter | Adam | 12th Evicted; Day 70 |
| 14 | Matúš | Adam; Peter | Klára | Hoku | Klára | 13th Evicted; Day 70 |
| 15 | Elimination Week | | | | Stanislava | 14th Evicted; Day 73 |
| 15 | Semi Final | | | | Lucy | 15th Evicted; Day 74 |
| 15 | Final Duel | | | | Hoku | 2nd Runner-up; Day 75 |
| 15 | Final Duel | | | | Matúš | Runner-up; Day 75 |
| 15 | Final Duel | | | | Peter | Winner; Day 75 |
