= Jerzykowice Małe =

- Village
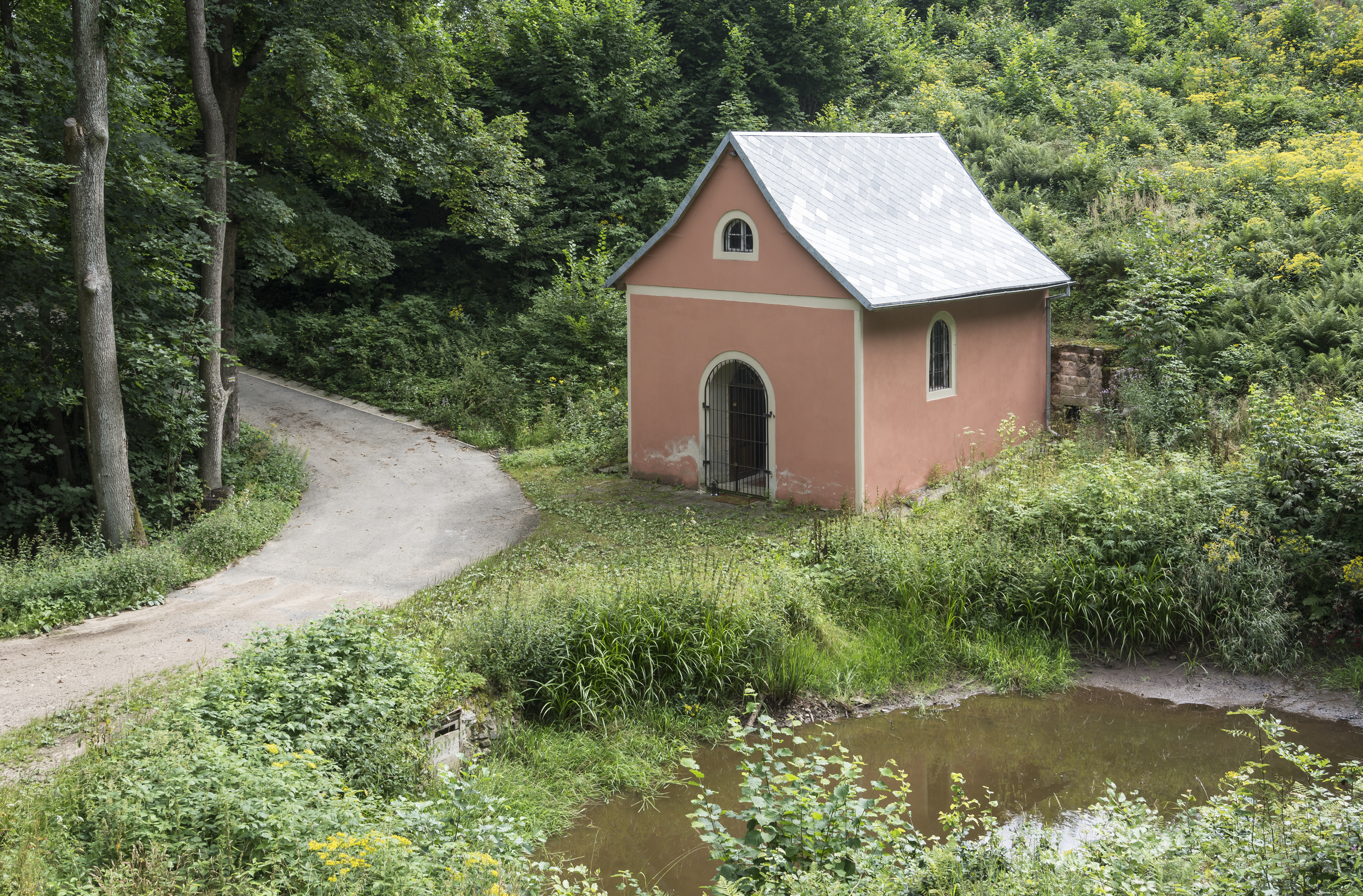
- Chapel in the village

- Location within Poland
- Coordinates: 50°23′21″N 16°18′45″E
- Country: Poland
- Voivodeship: Lower Silesian
- County: Kłodzko
- Gmina: Lewin Kłodzki

Jerzykowice Małe [jɛʐɨkɔˈvit͡sɛ ˈmawɛ] is a village in the administrative district of Gmina Lewin Kłodzki, within Kłodzko County, Lower Silesian Voivodeship, in south-western Poland.
