= Kulin Kłodzki =

- Village
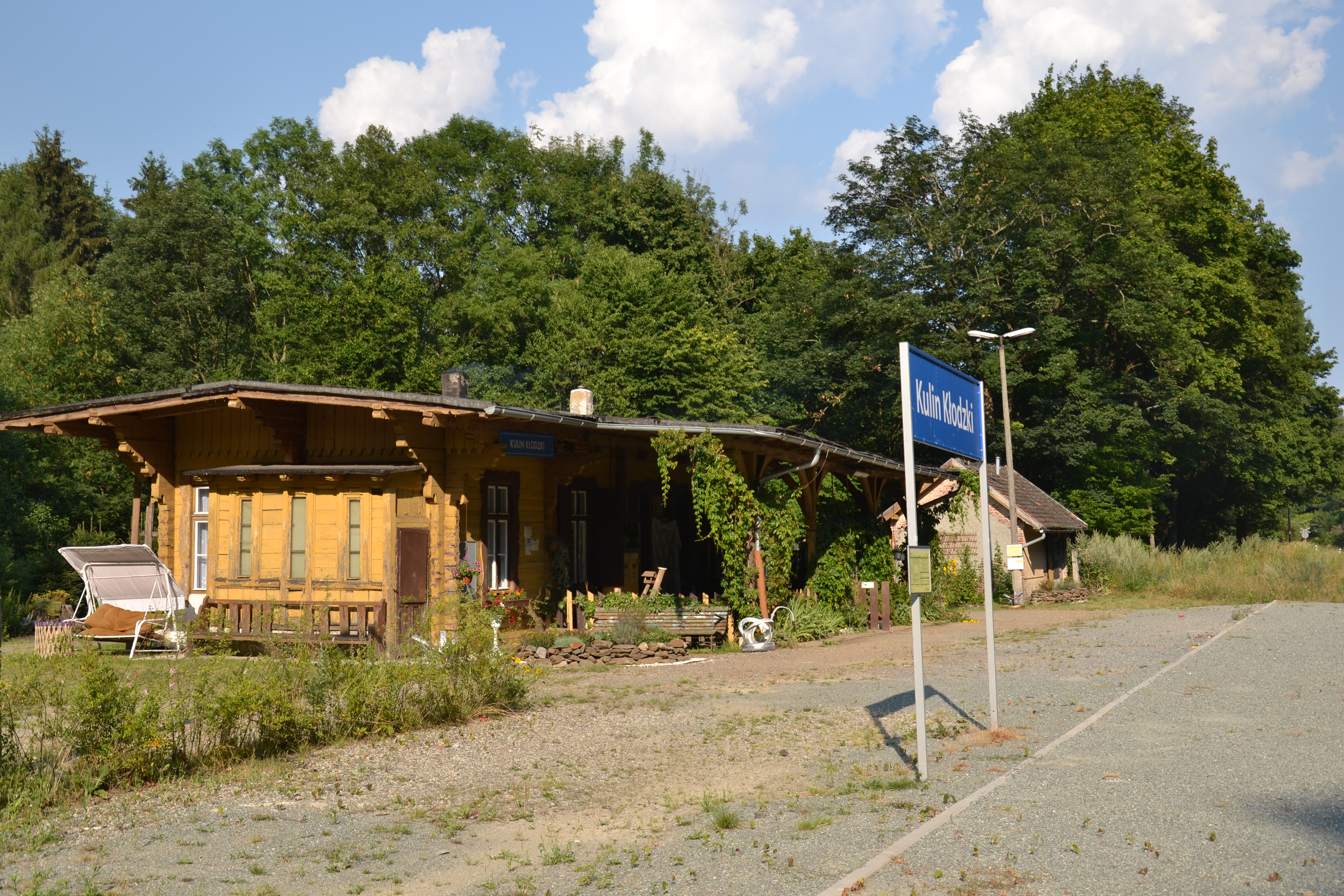
- Railway station

- Location within Poland
- Coordinates: 50°25′14″N 16°19′46″E
- Country: Poland
- Voivodeship: Lower Silesian
- County: Kłodzko
- Gmina: Lewin Kłodzki

Kulin Kłodzki [ˈkulin ˈkwɔt͡ski] is a village in the administrative district of Gmina Lewin Kłodzki, within Kłodzko County, Lower Silesian Voivodeship, in south-western Poland.
