= Kocioł, Lower Silesian Voivodeship =

Kocioł
- Village
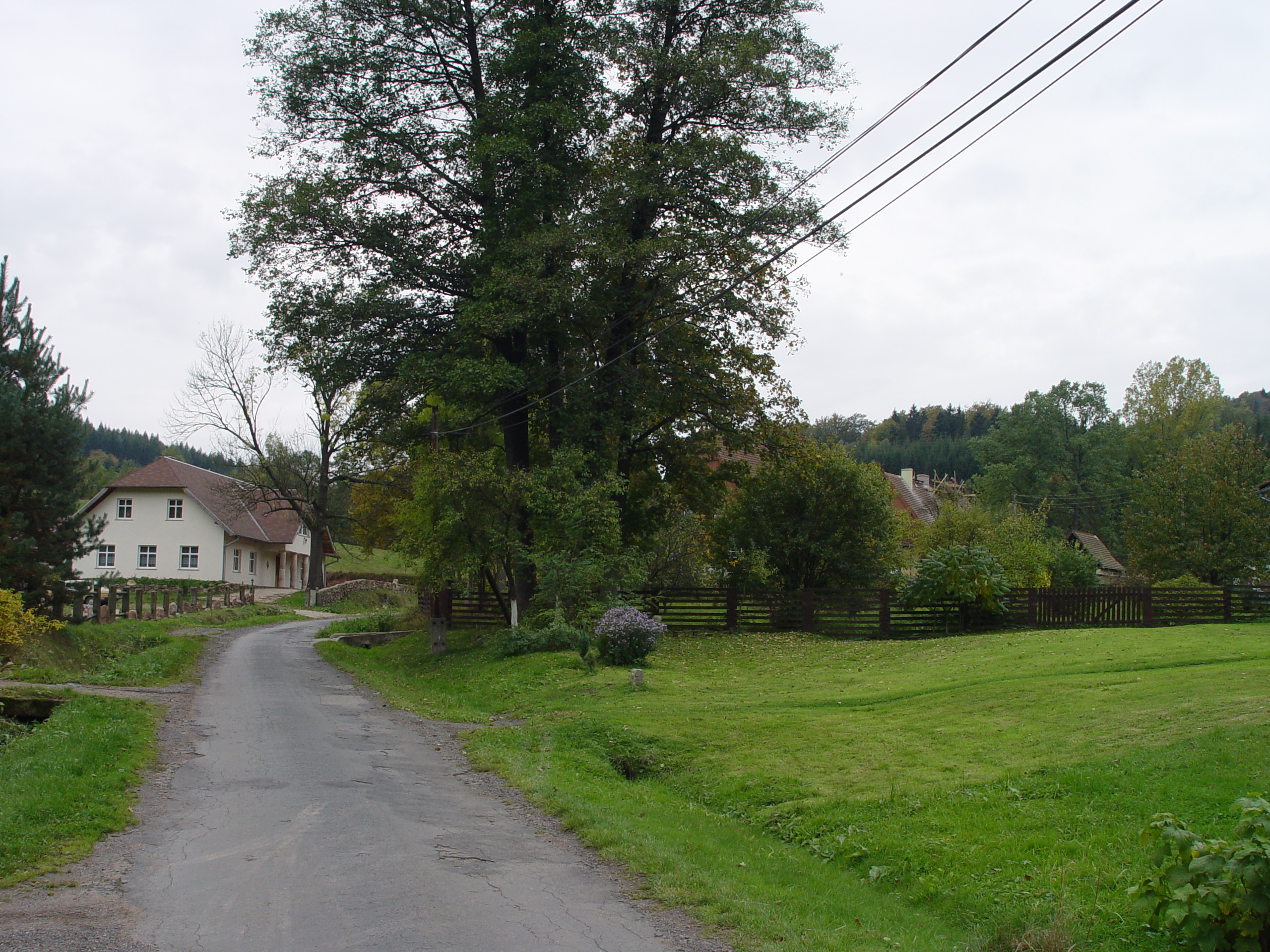

- Location within Poland
- Coordinates: 50°23′01″N 16°17′55″E
- Country: Poland
- Voivodeship: Lower Silesian
- County: Kłodzko
- Gmina: Lewin Kłodzki

Kocioł [ˈkɔt͡ɕɔu̯] is a village in the administrative district of Gmina Lewin Kłodzki, within Kłodzko County, Lower Silesian Voivodeship, in south-western Poland.
