= Lewin Kłodzki =

- Village
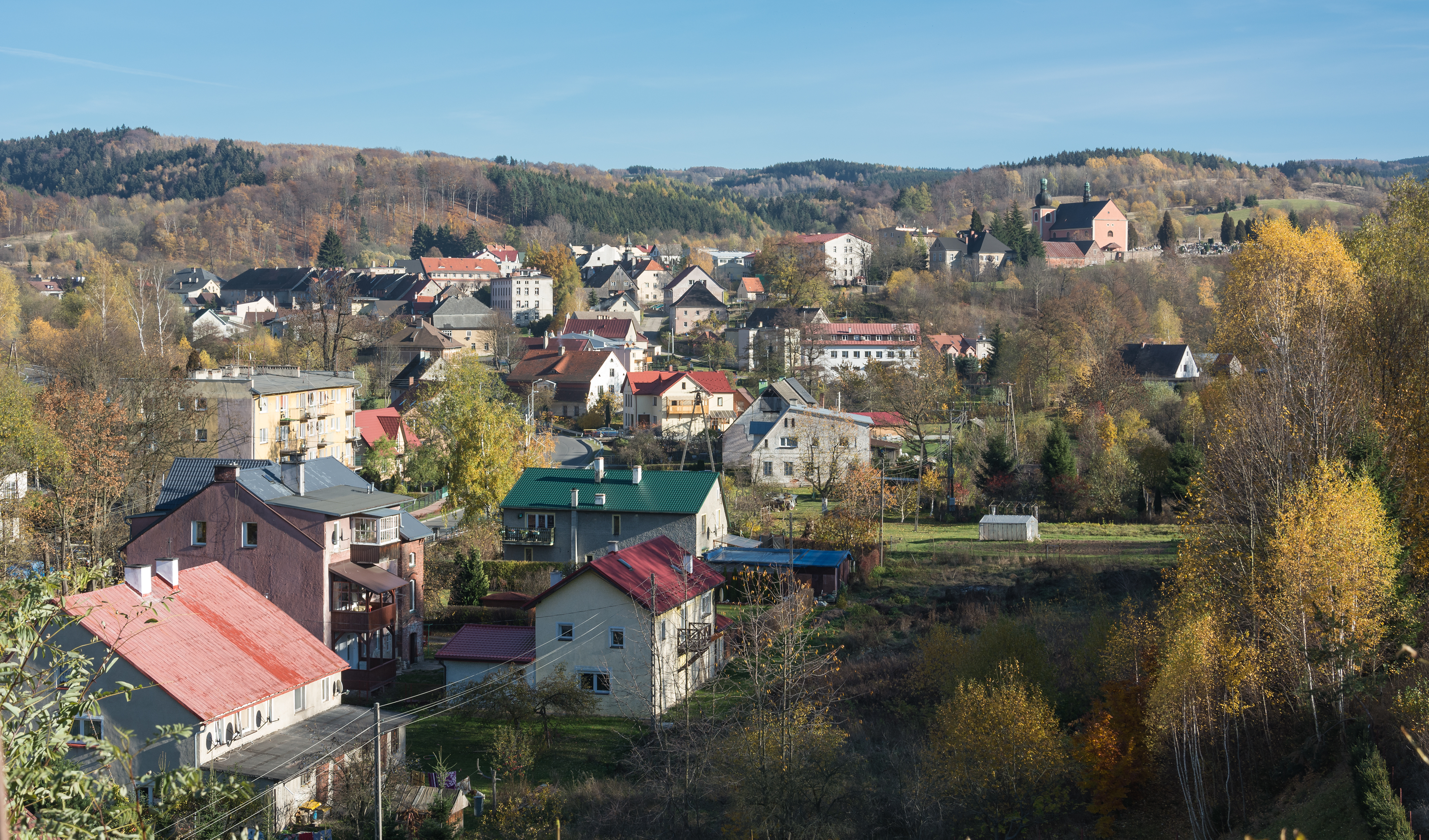
- Lewin Kłodzki

- Coat of arms

- Location within Poland
- Coordinates: 50°25′N 16°17′E
- Country: Poland
- Voivodeship: Lower Silesian
- County: Kłodzko
- Gmina: Lewin Kłodzki

Population
  - Total: 1,200
- Time zone: UTC+1 (CET)
  - Summer (DST): UTC+2 (CEST)
- Vehicle registration: DKL
- Website: lewinklodzki.pl

Lewin Kłodzki [ˈlɛvin ˈkwɔt͡ski] is a village (former town) in the Sudetes, in Kłodzko County, Lower Silesian Voivodeship, in south-western Poland, near the border with the Czech Republic. It is the seat of the administrative district (gmina) called Gmina Lewin Kłodzki.

== Etymology ==
The name is of Slavic origin, and comes from either the word lubić, which means "to like" or from the name of supposed founder Lew (Old Polish variant of the name Leon). Other Polish names were Miesteczek, Miasteczko and Lewińce.

== History ==
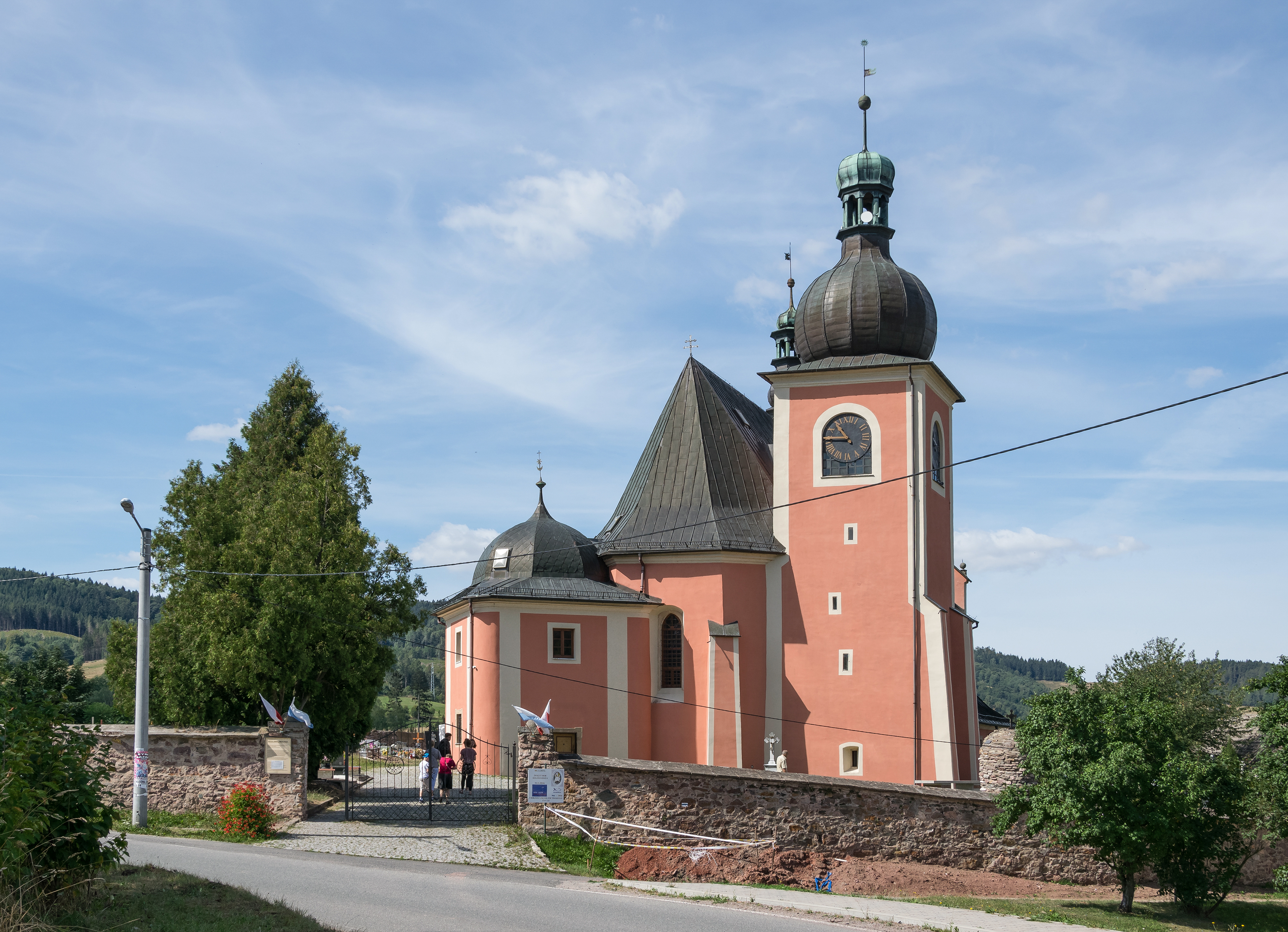
Catholic Church of Michael the Archangel, 14th-century

It is difficult to determine when the first settlement was established at the site of today's Lewin Kłodzki. However, historians agree that first traces of human settlement date back to the 10th century, during the foundation of the Bohemian state under the Přemyslid dynasty.

It was then that a timber watchtower was constructed on Gródek Hill, at an altitude of 522 meters above sea level. The lone tower was not a usual border keep with a strong military garrison, but a rather insignificant checkpoint guarding the trade route which passed through Lewin. Over time, various merchants, artisans and peasants began to settle at the foot of the mountain, thus giving Lewin a town status as well as town privileges in the early 14th century. A similar watchtower, made of stone, was built on the Homole Hills. Its uncovered ruins were incorrectly referred to as the Lewin Castle, giving rise to a belief that a fortified castle once stood in the village.

Following the death of Doubravka, the Czech wife of Polish Duke Mieszko I, Bohemia demanded the return of Lewin which was under Mieszko's rule. The Polish-Bohemian alliance eventually collapsed and Lewin Kłodzki became part of the inheritance dispute. The town was also destroyed under the Hussites, who plundered the region. Lewin was first mentioned in legal documents as Levinice in 1213. It was then that king Ottokar I of Bohemia founded a monastery nearby, between Lewin and Kudowa-Zdrój. In 1426, it was devastated by the Hussites.

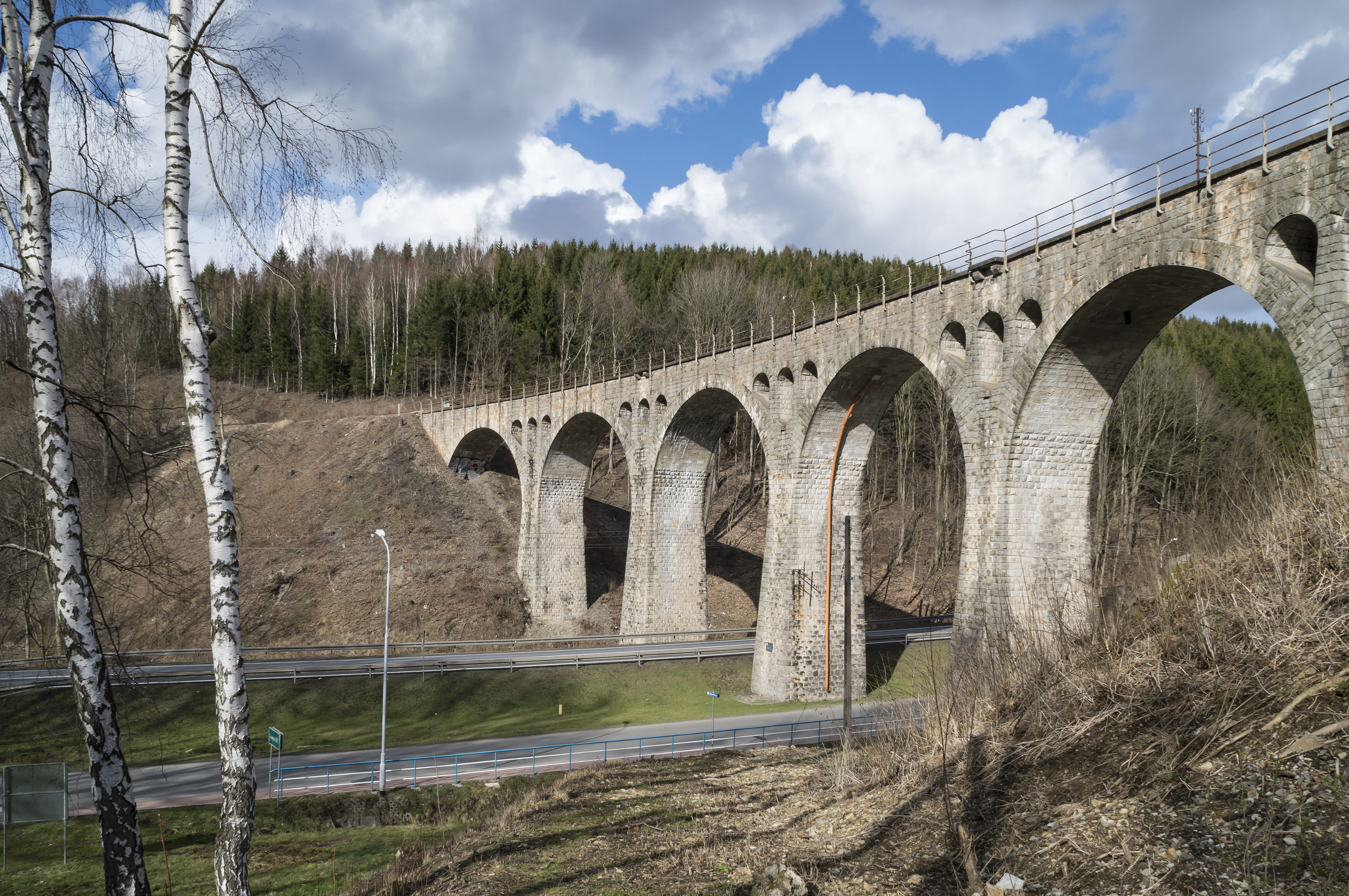
A rail overpass used by trains in Lewin Kłodzki, 1903-1905

The town became part of the Habsburg monarchy and in 1576 it was completely destroyed by a fire. In the 16th century, it began to prosper and transform into a weaving centre. The weavers, who from diverse parts of Central Europe, contributed to Lewin's evolution and growth. The town was also well known for producing wooden spoons until they became obsolete and replaced by metal ones. Throughout the First Silesian War the Prussian army terrorized local populace that supported the Austrian faction. The town subsequently became part of the Kingdom of Prussia and later the German Empire in 1871. A regiment of Napoleon's army was also stationed in Lewin.

The cloth industry in Silesia eventually collapsed and the growth of the region halted. Since the 19th century, Lewin has been known to be part of a trail of spa towns with the close by Kudowa-Zdrój and Duszniki-Zdrój. It was a popular spot for holidaymakers who visited the surrounding Sudetes and enjoyed the rural hill-like scenery. In 1938 the Nazis changed the name of Lewin to Hummelstadt as the previous name was deemed too Slavic. In accordance with the Potsdam Agreement, the town again became part of Poland after World War II. The local German population was expelled and new Polish arrivals settled from the Eastern Borderlands (so-called "Kresy") that were annexed by the Soviet Union. In 1946, due to depopulation and its small size, the Polish authorities degraded Lewin to the status of a village. In 1947, it was renamed to Lewin Kłodzki by adding the adjective Kłodzki to distinguish it from other settlements of the same name.
