= Lesná (Třebíč District) =

- Municipality
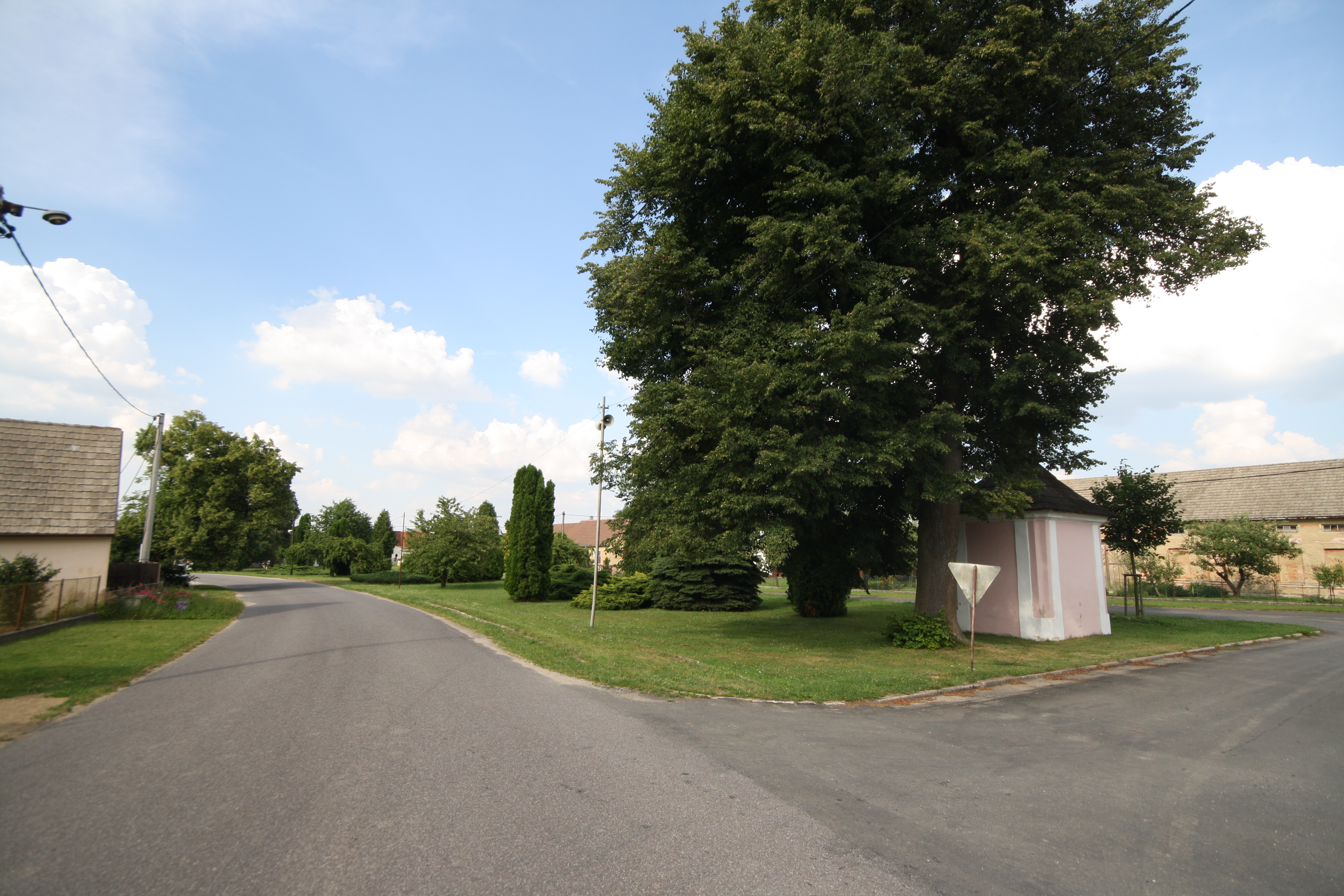
- Centre of Lesná

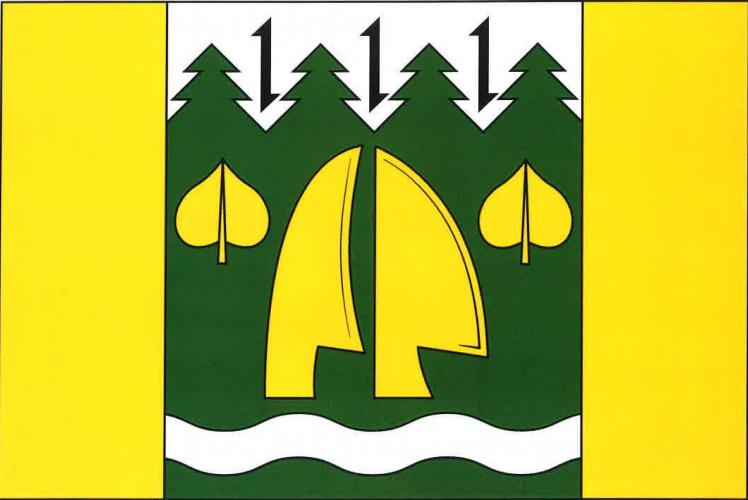
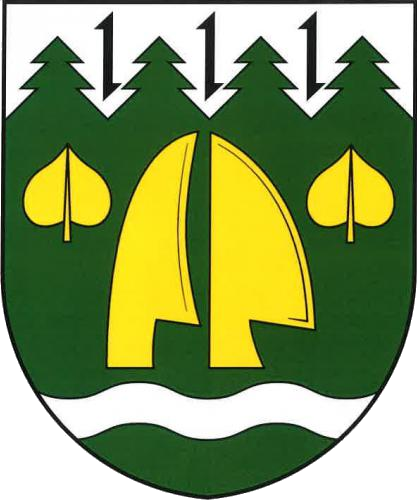
- Flag Coat of arms

- Location in the Czech Republic
- Coordinates: 49°10′17″N 15°40′46″E
- Country: Czech Republic
- Region: Vysočina
- District: Třebíč
- Founded: 1715

Area
  - Total: 2.47 km^{2} (0.95 sq mi)
- Elevation: 664 m (2,178 ft)

Population (2026-01-01)
  - Total: 90
  - Density: 36/km^{2} (94/sq mi)
- Time zone: UTC+1 (CET)
  - Summer (DST): UTC+2 (CEST)
- Postal code: 675 26
- Website: www.obec-lesna.com

Lesná is a municipality and village in Třebíč District in the Vysočina Region of the Czech Republic. It has about 100 inhabitants.

Lesná lies approximately 15 kilometres (9 mi) west of Třebíč, 26 km (16 mi) south of Jihlava, and 137 km (85 mi) south-east of Prague.

== Demographics ==
Historical population
Year	Pop.	±%
1869	180	—
1880	226	+25.6%
1890	232	+2.7%
1900	227	−2.2%
1910	222	−2.2%
1921	258	+16.2%
1930	228	−11.6%
1950	203	−11.0%
1961	210	+3.4%
1970	175	−16.7%
1980	129	−26.3%
1991	99	−23.3%
2001	93	−6.1%
2011	89	−4.3%
2021	97	+9.0%
Source: Censuses
