= Lesná (Pelhřimov District) =

- Municipality
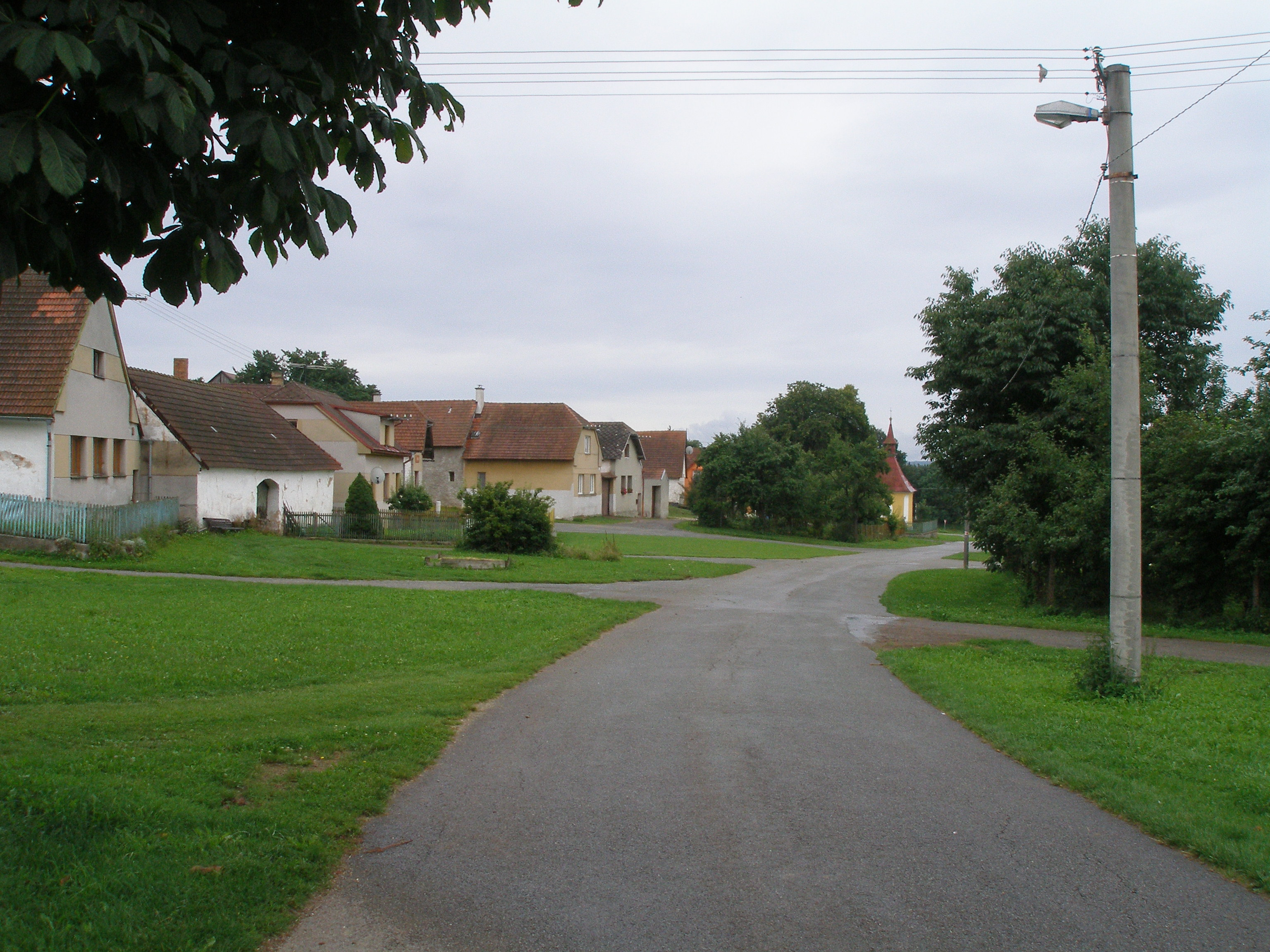
- Centre of Lesná

- Location in the Czech Republic
- Coordinates: 49°31′5″N 15°3′27″E
- Country: Czech Republic
- Region: Vysočina
- District: Pelhřimov
- First mentioned: 1299

Area
  - Total: 4.42 km^{2} (1.71 sq mi)
- Elevation: 530 m (1,740 ft)

Population (2026-01-01)
  - Total: 60
  - Density: 14/km^{2} (35/sq mi)
- Time zone: UTC+1 (CET)
  - Summer (DST): UTC+2 (CEST)
- Postal code: 395 01
- Website: www.lesna.cz

Lesná is a municipality and village in Pelhřimov District in the Vysočina Region of the Czech Republic. It has about 60 inhabitants.

Lesná lies approximately 16 kilometres (10 mi) north-west of Pelhřimov, 41 km (25 mi) west of Jihlava, and 79 km (49 mi) south-east of Prague.

== Demographics ==
Historical population
Year	Pop.	±%
1869	237	—
1880	233	−1.7%
1890	222	−4.7%
1900	234	+5.4%
1910	222	−5.1%
1921	229	+3.2%
1930	175	−23.6%
1950	143	−18.3%
1961	137	−4.2%
1970	125	−8.8%
1980	100	−20.0%
1991	70	−30.0%
2001	67	−4.3%
2011	73	+9.0%
2021	62	−15.1%
Source: Censuses
