= Jawornica, Lower Silesian Voivodeship =

Jawornica
- Village
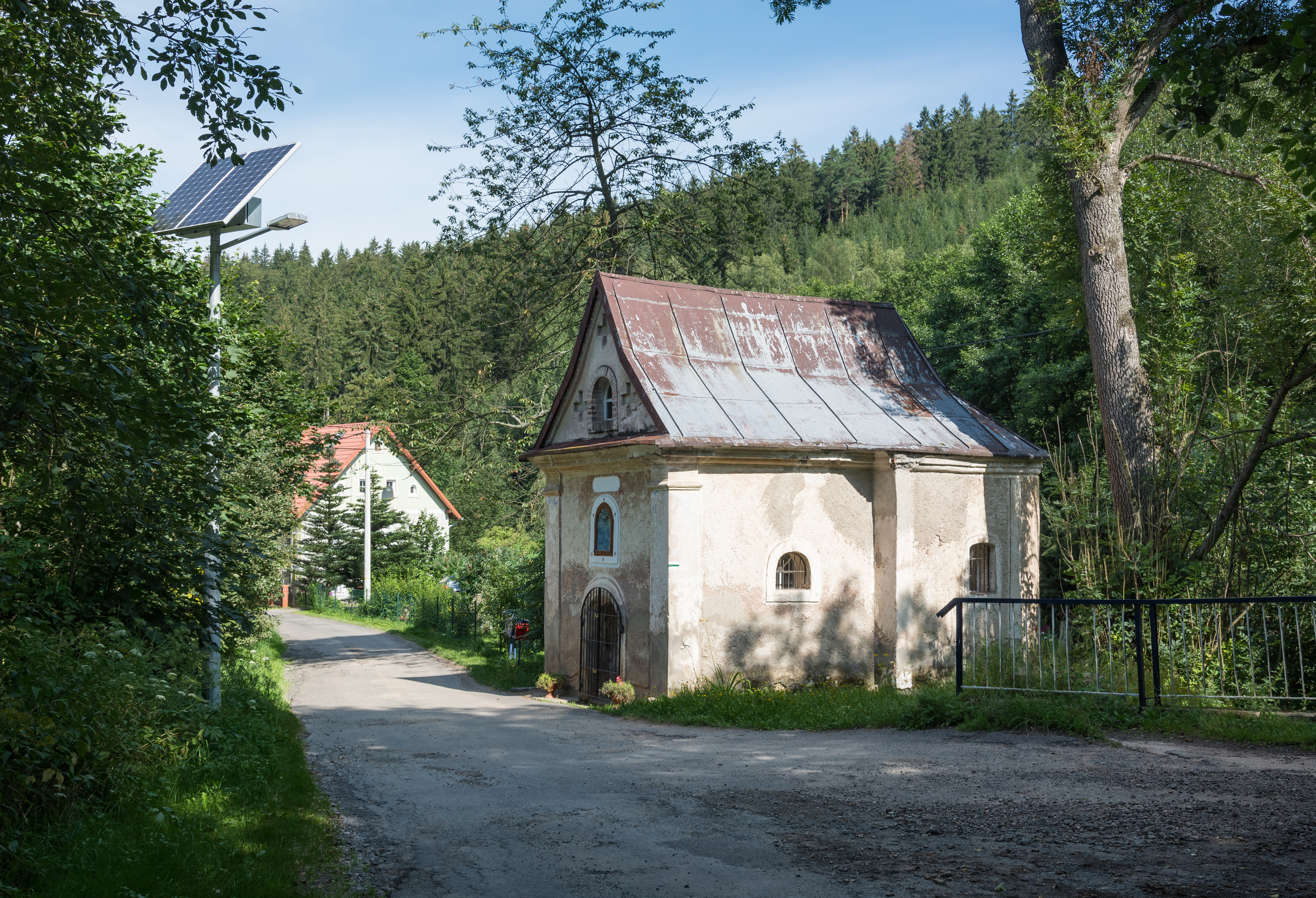
- Chapel

- Location within Poland
- Coordinates: 50°23′39″N 16°19′50″E
- Country: Poland
- Voivodeship: Lower Silesian
- County: Kłodzko
- Gmina: Lewin Kłodzki
- Time zone: UTC+1 (CET)
  - Summer (DST): UTC+2 (CEST)
- Vehicle registration: DKL

Jawornica [javɔrˈnit͡sa] is a village in the administrative district of Gmina Lewin Kłodzki, within Kłodzko County, Lower Silesian Voivodeship, in south-western Poland. Jawornica has a population of about 78 people. It is a small rural mountain village located in a hilly area in southwestern Poland, in the historic Kłodzko Land region.

== Etymology ==
The name of the village is of Slavic origin, and comes from word jawor ("sycamore maple").
