= Leśna, Kłodzko County =

Leśna
- Village
- Location within Poland
- Coordinates: 50°24′54″N 16°18′34″E
- Country: Poland
- Voivodeship: Lower Silesian
- County: Kłodzko
- Gmina: Lewin Kłodzki
- Population: 10

Leśna [ˈlɛɕna] is a village in the administrative district of Gmina Lewin Kłodzki, within Kłodzko County, Lower Silesian Voivodeship, in south-western Poland.
