= Stará Lesná =

- Municipality
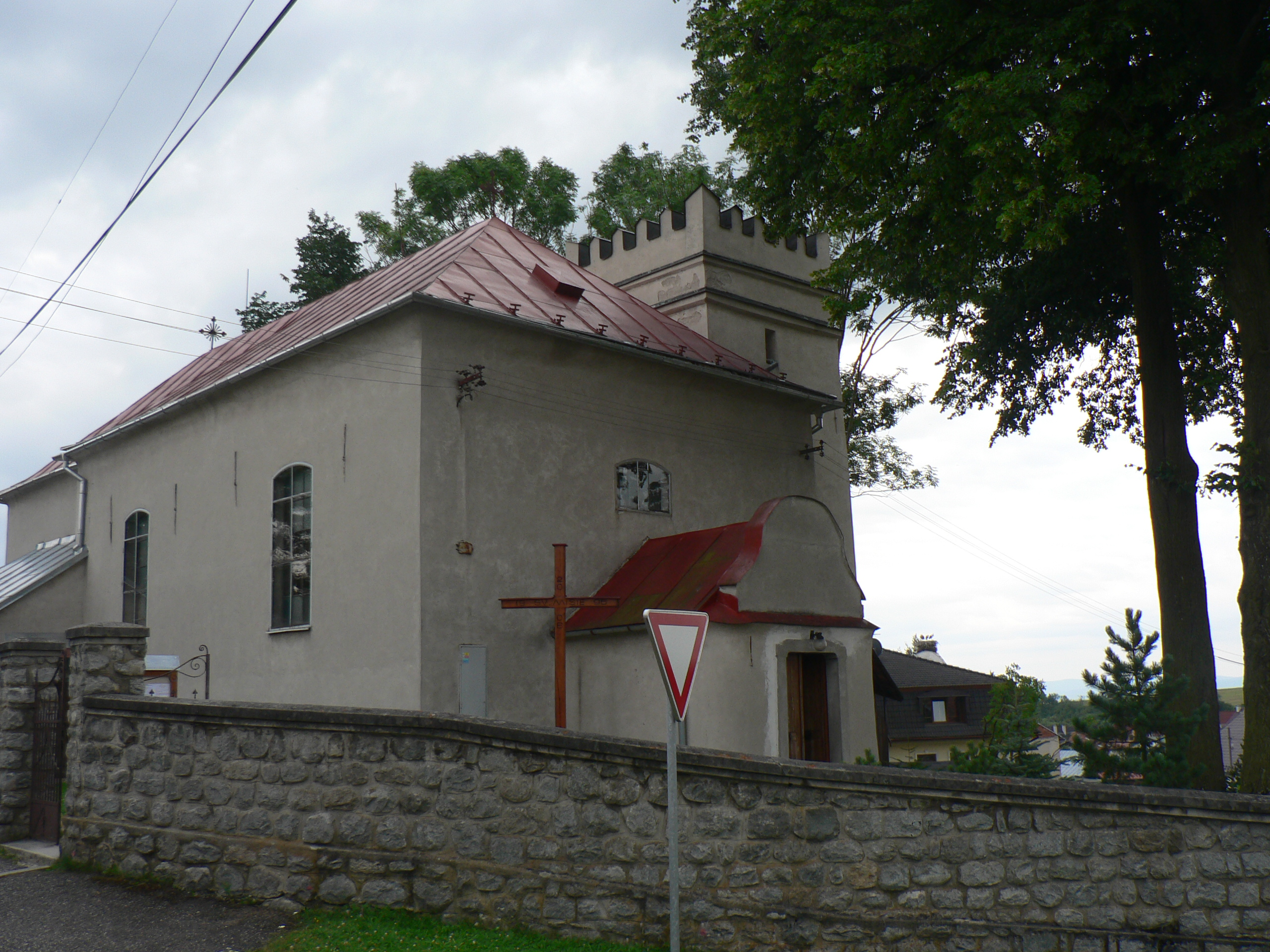

- Flag

- Location of Stará Lesná in the Prešov Region Location of Stará Lesná in Slovakia
- Coordinates: 49.13°N 20.32°E
- Country: Slovakia
- Region: Prešov Region
- District: Kežmarok District
- First mentioned: 1294

Area
  - Total: 9.48 km^{2} (3.66 sq mi)
- Elevation: 731 m (2,398 ft)

Population (2025)
  - Total: 992
- Time zone: UTC+1 (CET)
  - Summer (DST): UTC+2 (CEST)
- Postal code: 595 2
- Area code: +421 52
- Vehicle registration plate (until 2022): KK
- Website: www.staralesna.sk

Stará Lesná or "Old Forest" (German: Alt Walddorf) is a village and municipality in Kežmarok District in the Prešov Region in north-central Slovakia. Stará Lesná is located in an area traditionally known as Spiš and it is situated within the Slovak Tourism Region of the Tatras.

== History ==
The tourism region of the Tatras encompasses today the northern half (except for a tiny tip lying in Poland) of what used to be Scepusium or Szepes County. It was a part of the Kingdom of Hungary from the creation of the county in the second half of the 12th century to 1918 when Austria-Hungary ceased to exist and Czechoslovakia was created. This northern borderland was never really inhabited by Hungarians, but up until the last world war there was a substantial population of Carpathian Germans in Spiš or "Zips", where they began to arrive in the mid-12th century.

Stará Lesná was mentioned for the first time in 1294. The village was founded by the Berzeviczys, a family whose forefather Rutkér of Mátray (Matrei), an ispán, arrived to Spiš County from Tyrol in the beginning of the 13th century. The village belonged to a German language island. The German population was expelled in 1945.

== Geography ==
The municipality lies at an altitude of 731 metres (2,398 ft) and covers an area of 9.48 km^{2} (3.66 sq mi) (2025). To the north, Stará Lesná is bordered by the town of Vysoké Tatry and Tatra National Park.

Line no. 184 of the Tatra Electric Railway connects Stará Lesná with Tatranská Lomnica and Starý Smokovec; the latter is connected to Štrbské Pleso and Poprad by line no. 183.

== Population ==
Population statistic (10 years)
| Year | 1995 | 2005 | 2015 | 2025 |
|---|---|---|---|---|
| Count | 766 | 946 | 1005 | 992 |
| Difference | | +23.49% | +6.23% | −1.29% |

Population statistic
| Year | 2024 | 2025 |
|---|---|---|
| Count | 985 | 992 |
| Difference | | +0.71% |

It has a population of 992 people (31 December 2025).

=== Ethnicity ===
Census 2021 (1+ %)
| Ethnicity | Number | Fraction |
|---|---|---|
| Slovak | 864 | 88.98% |
| Not found out | 82 | 8.44% |
| Romani | 51 | 5.25% |
| Russian | 15 | 1.54% |
| Total | 971 | |

In year 2021 was 971 people by ethnicity 864 as Slovak, 82 as Not found out, 51 as Romani, 15 as Russian, 5 as Rusyn, 3 as Polish, 2 as Czech, 2 as Hungarian, 1 as Jewish, 1 as Ukrainian, 1 as German and 1 as French.

Note on population: The difference values of population numbers in the table "Population statistic" and in the sections "Ethnicity" & "Religion" is caused by the use of various statistical methods.

=== Religion ===
Census 2021 (1+ %)
| Religion | Number | Fraction |
|---|---|---|
| Roman Catholic Church | 589 | 60.66% |
| None | 198 | 20.39% |
| Not found out | 77 | 7.93% |
| Evangelical Church | 39 | 4.02% |
| Greek Catholic Church | 24 | 2.47% |
| Jehovah's Witnesses | 10 | 1.03% |
| Total | 971 | |

In year 2021 was 971 people by religion 589 from Roman Catholic Church, 198 from None, 77 from Not found out, 39 from Evangelical Church, 24 from Greek Catholic Church, 10 from Jehovah's Witnesses, 9 from Other and not ascertained christian church, 8 from Eastern Orthodox Church, 5 from Paganism and natural spirituality, 4 from Ad hoc movements, 3 from Christian Congregations in Slovakia, 1 from Jewish community, 1 from Old Catholic Church, 1 from Calvinist Church, 1 from Other and 1 from Buddhism.
