= Gołaczów, Kłodzko County =

Gołaczów
- Village
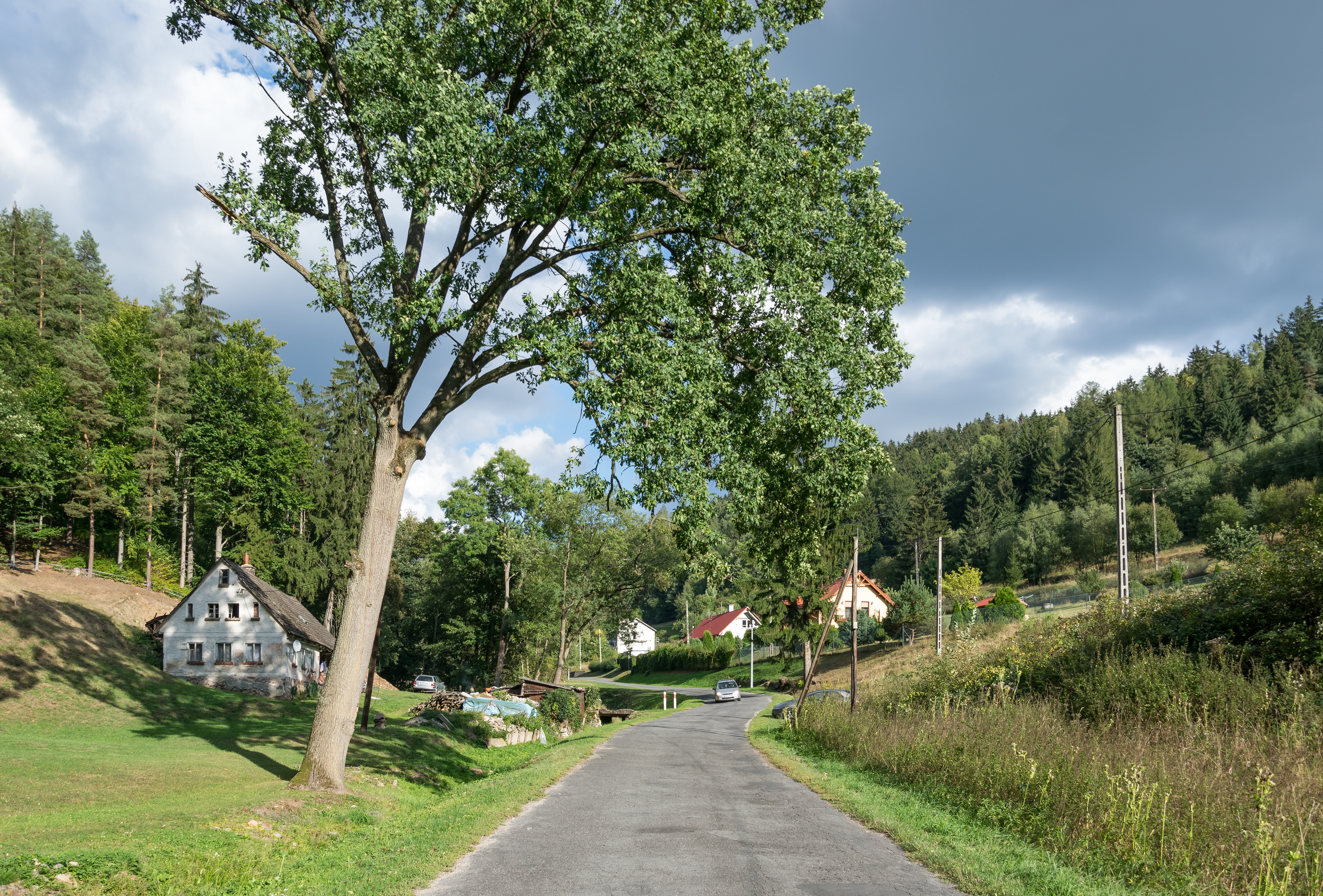

- Location within Poland
- Coordinates: 50°25′49″N 16°18′36″E
- Country: Poland
- Voivodeship: Lower Silesian
- County: Kłodzko
- Gmina: Lewin Kłodzki

Gołaczów ([ɡɔˈwat͡ʂuf] is a village in the administrative district of Gmina Lewin Kłodzki, within Kłodzko County, Lower Silesian Voivodeship, in south-western Poland.
