= Rajecká Lesná =

- Municipality
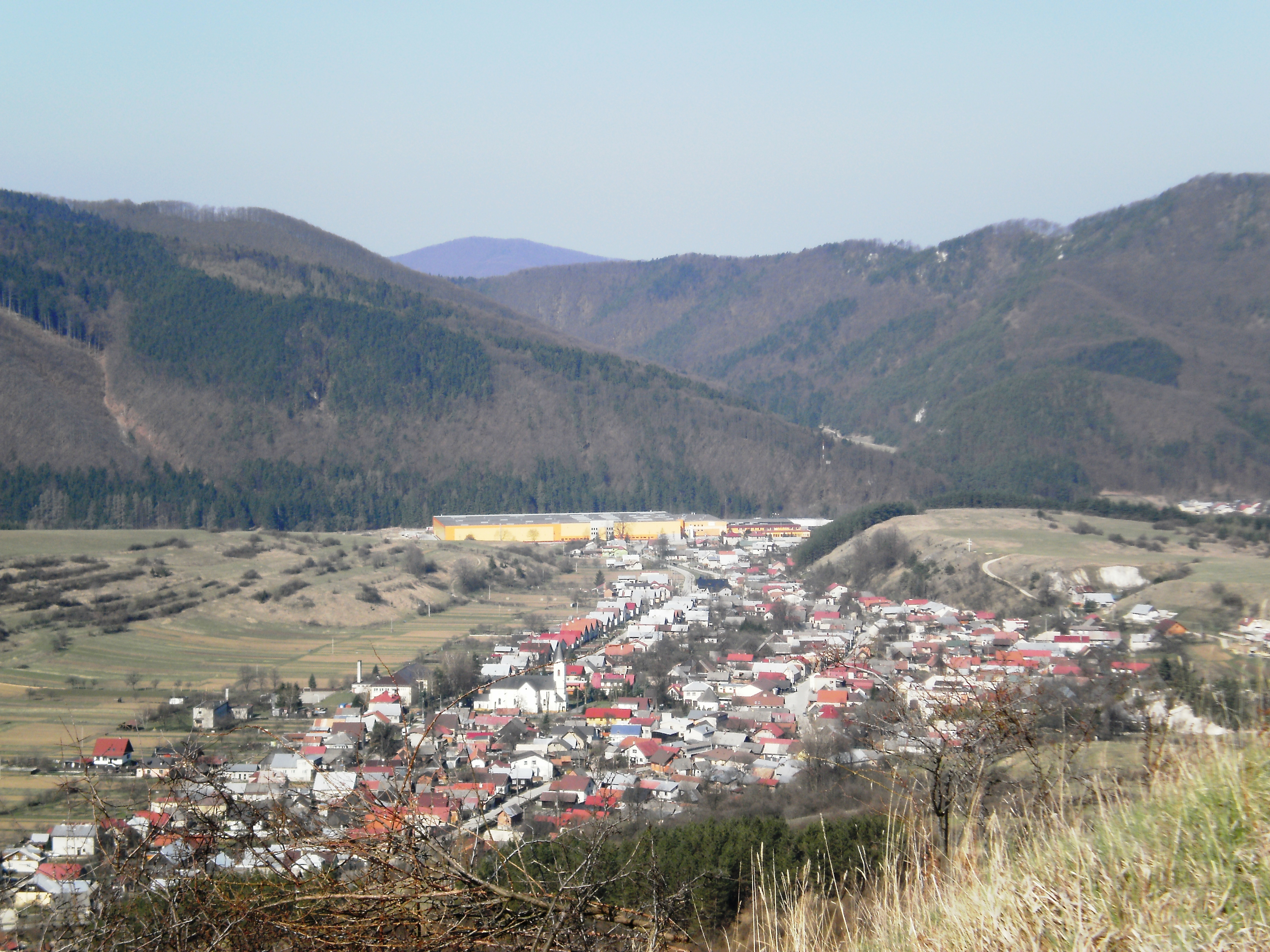

- Flag

- Location of Rajecká Lesná in the Žilina Region Location of Rajecká Lesná in Slovakia
- Coordinates: 49.05°N 18.65°E
- Country: Slovakia
- Region: Žilina Region
- District: Žilina District
- First mentioned: 1474

Area
  - Total: 39.26 km^{2} (15.16 sq mi)
- Elevation: 508 m (1,667 ft)

Population (2025)
  - Total: 1,171
- Time zone: UTC+1 (CET)
  - Summer (DST): UTC+2 (CEST)
- Postal code: 131 5
- Area code: +421 41
- Vehicle registration plate (until 2022): ZA
- Website: www.rajeckalesna.info

Rajecká Lesná (formerly Fryvald-Lesná; Hungarian: Frivaldnádas, until 1906 Trsztyennafrivald) is a village and municipality in Žilina District in the Žilina Region of northern Slovakia.

== History ==
In historical records, the village was first mentioned in 1474. Rajecka Lesna has been a place of pilgrimage since the 15th century. The largest pilgrimage takes place on 8 September, the feast of Virgin Mary's Nativity.

== Geography ==
The municipality lies at an altitude of 508 metres (1,667 ft) and covers an area of 39.26 km^{2} (15.16 sq mi) (2025).

== Population ==
Population statistic (10 years)
Year	1995	2005	2015	2025
Count	1282	1282	1205	1171
Difference		+0%	−6.00%	−2.82%

Population statistic
Year	2024	2025
Count	1192	1171
Difference		−1.76%

It has a population of 1171 people (31 December 2025).

=== Ethnicity ===
Census 2021 (1+ %)
Ethnicity	Number	Fraction
Slovak	1224	99.18%
Total	1234	

In year 2021 was 1234 people by ethnicity 1224 as Slovak, 10 as Not found out, 6 as Other, 6 as English, 5 as Czech, 2 as Austrian, 1 as Russian, 1 as Polish and 1 as Moravian.

Note on population: The difference values of population numbers in the table "Population statistic" and in the sections "Ethnicity" & "Religion" is caused by the use of various statistical methods.

=== Religion ===
Census 2021 (1+ %)
Religion	Number	Fraction
Roman Catholic Church	1094	88.65%
None	106	8.59%
Total	1234	

In year 2021 was 1234 people by religion 1094 from Roman Catholic Church, 106 from None, 9 from Not found out, 5 from Other and not ascertained christian church, 5 from Christian Congregations in Slovakia, 4 from Old Catholic Church, 3 from Other, 3 from Evangelical Church, 2 from Greek Catholic Church, 1 from Czechoslovak Hussite Church, 1 from Church of the Brethren and 1 from Ad hoc movements.
