= Duszniki-Zdrój =

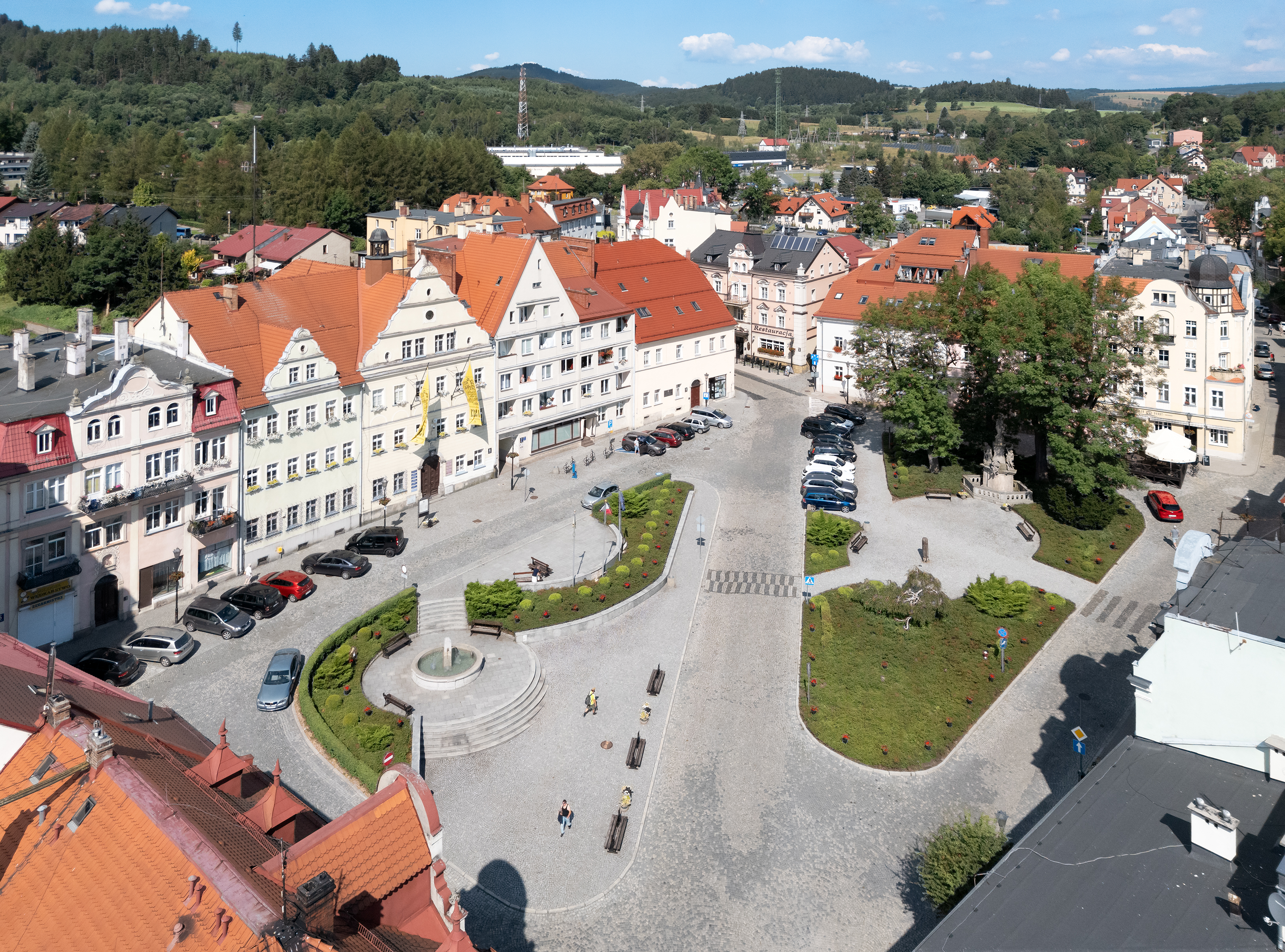
- Market Square in 2024

- Flag Coat of arms

- Location within Poland
- Coordinates: 50°23′N 16°23′E
- Country: Poland
- Lower Silesian: Lower Silesian
- County: Kłodzko
- Gmina: Duszniki-Zdrój (urban gmina)
- Established: 10th century
- Town rights: 1346

Government
  - Mayor: Urszula Karpowicz

Area
  - Total: 22.28 km^{2} (8.60 sq mi)
- Elevation: 583 m (1,913 ft)

Population (31 December 2021)
  - Total: 4,329
  - Density: 194.3/km^{2} (503.2/sq mi)
- Time zone: UTC+1 (CET)
  - Summer (DST): UTC+2 (CEST)
- Postal code: 57-340
- Area code: +48 74
- Car plates: DKL
- Website: http://www.duszniki.pl/

Duszniki-Zdrój ([duʂˈɲikʲi ˈzdrui̯]; Czech: Dušníky; German: Bad Reinerz), often simplified to Duszniki, is a spa town in Kłodzko Valley and Kłodzko County, Lower Silesian Voivodeship, in southwestern Poland. As of December 2021, the town has a population of 4,329. Situated on the Bystrzyca River, it attracts tourists from Poland and around the world.

== History ==
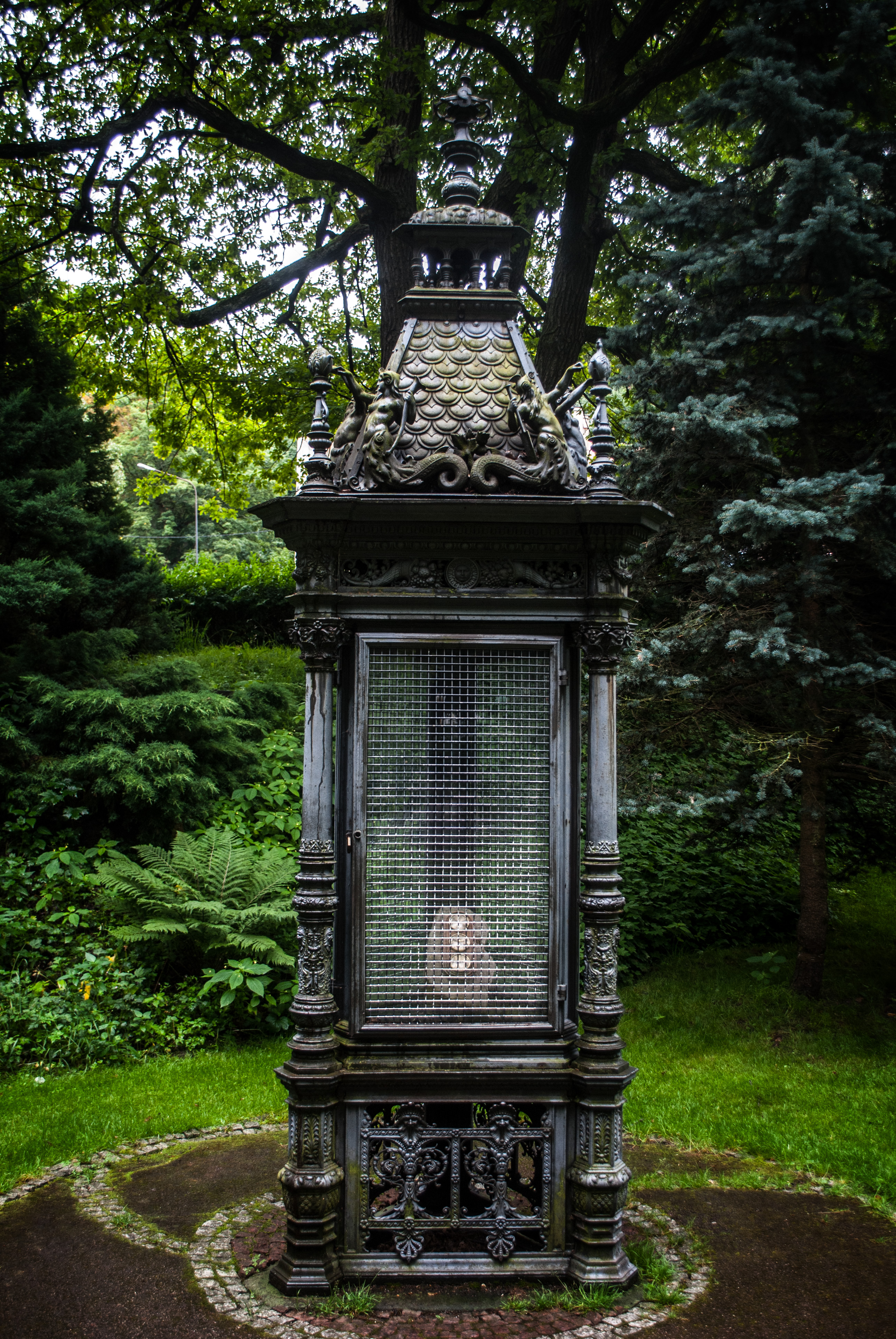
Historic barometer in the spa park

The settlement was mentioned in 1324. The town was colonized by Germans and the name Reinerz likely refers to the place Reinhards in Hesse. It was granted town rights in 1346. Until 1595 it remained in private hands. A trade route connecting Silesia and Bohemia ran through the town, contributing to its development. Weaving and paper production developed, as well as the iron industry, but the local iron deposits quickly depleted. In 1584 a town hall was built, and in 1605 a paper mill, now housing the Museum of Papermaking. The town's development was stopped by the Thirty Years' War (1618-1648). In 1669 Polish King John II Casimir Vasa stopped in the town after his abdication.

In 1748 the first research on mineral springs was carried out, and in 1751 spa treatments began. In 1769, the town obtained the status of a spa town. In 1822 a pump room was founded. In 1826, 16-year-old Frédéric Chopin visited the spa. He was cured there and gave his first concert outside of the Russian Partition of Poland, which was also his first charity concert. In 1877 a palm house was built with a concert hall and a reading room, and after 1881 many guesthouses were built. In 1896 or 1897, a monument was unveiled commemorating the 60th anniversary of Chopin's stay.

In 1949, 1,500 Greek refugees of the Greek Civil War, mostly women and children, were temporarily admitted in Duszniki-Zdrój before new homes were found for them in other towns.

The town suffered in the 1997 Central European flood.

== Economy ==
The town's economy is based on tourism, with several hundred thousand people visiting the town and the area every year. In addition, there are several mineral water bottling plants, traditional paper works and a crystal jewellery producer. The Museum of Papermaking in Duszniki-Zdrój is located in the town.

== Spa ==
Although the area was known for its healthy waters at least since the late Middle Ages, the spa was officially founded in 1769. The natural sparkling waters of Duszniki are used in the treatment of a variety of illnesses, including cardiac problems, gastrical problems. In addition, there is a number of facilities for balneotherapy located in Duszniki and an osteoporosis treatment centre.

== Sights ==
Duszniki-Zdrój most recognizable landmark is the Museum of Papermaking established in an old 17th-century paper mill. It is listed as an official Historic Monument of Poland. Other significant places include the Saints Peter and Paul church, which contains a unique baroque, whale-stylized pulpit, and the Fryderyk Chopin Theatre, established in the place where in 1826, 16-year-old Fryderyk Chopin played his first concert outside of the Russian Partition of Poland and his first charity concert. The annual International Chopin Festival is held here since 1946.

== International relations ==
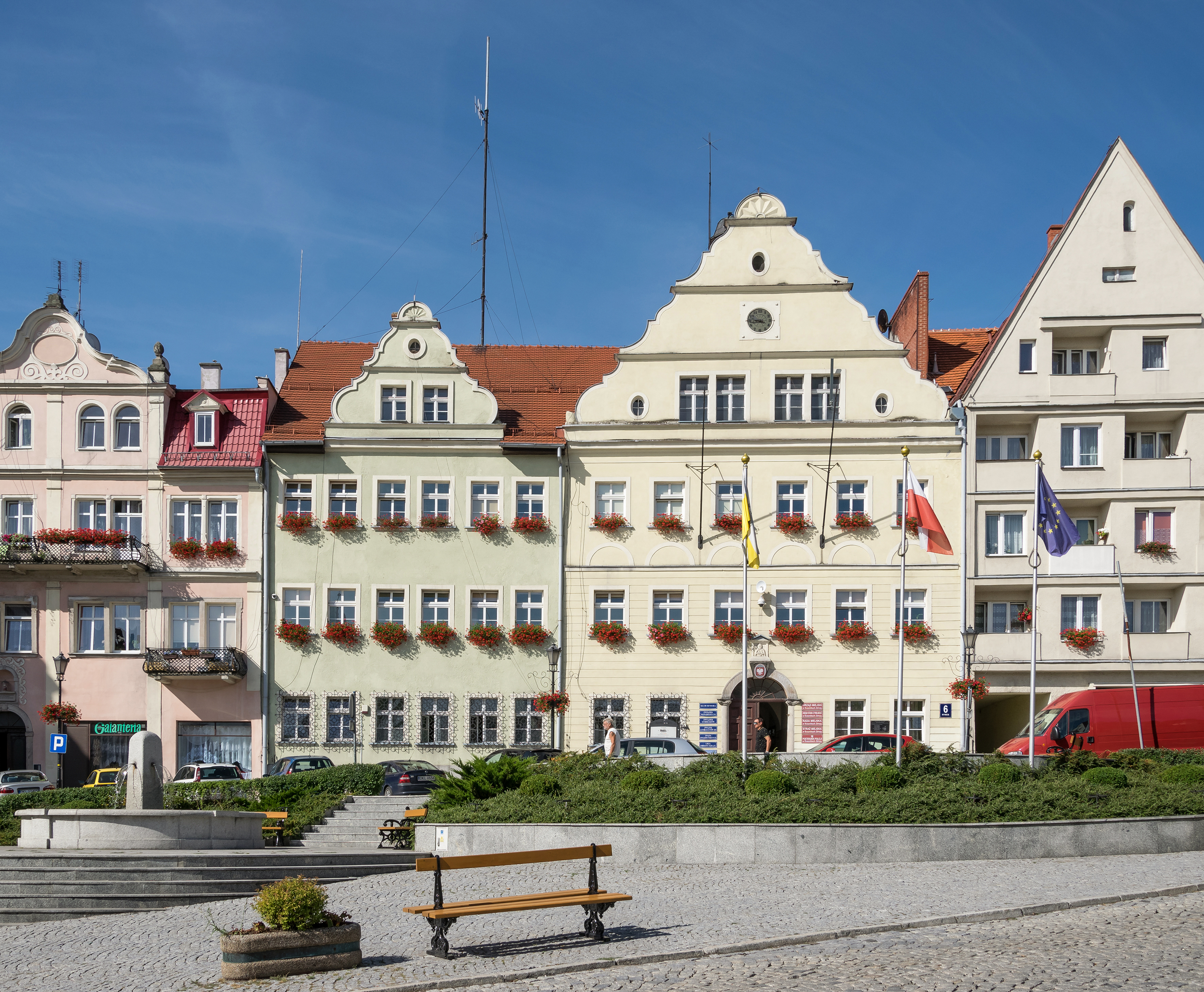
Town hall in Duszniki-Zdrój

Duszniki-Zdrój is twinned with:

- Audun-le-Tiche, France
- Bad Sulza, Germany
- Deštné v Orlických horách, Czech Republic
- Hoya, Germany
- Nové Město nad Metují, Czech Republic
- Olešnice v Orlických horách, Czech Republic
- Orlické Záhoří, Czech Republic
- Sedloňov, Czech Republic
- Trzcianka, Poland

== Gallery ==
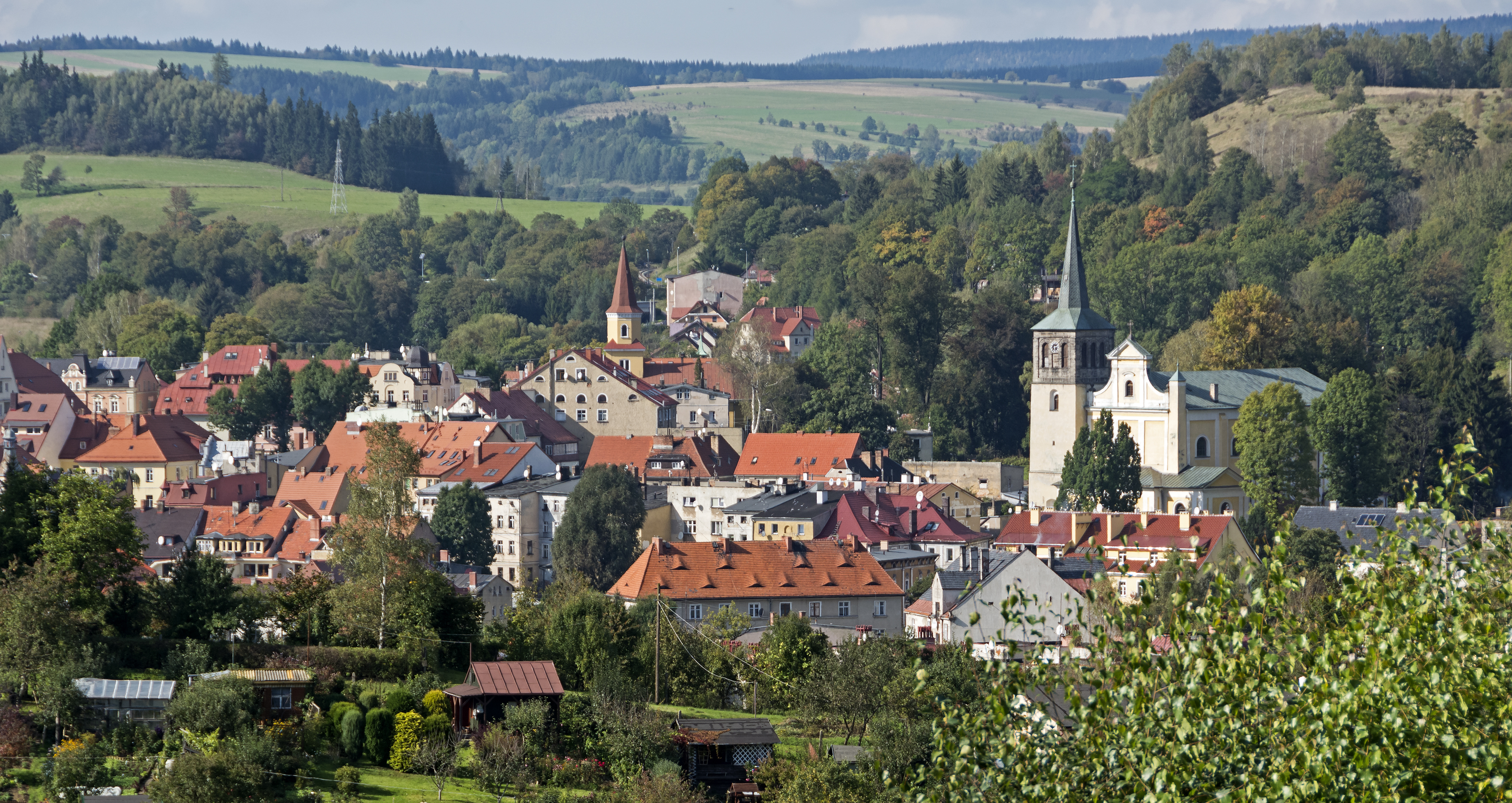
Panorama of the town

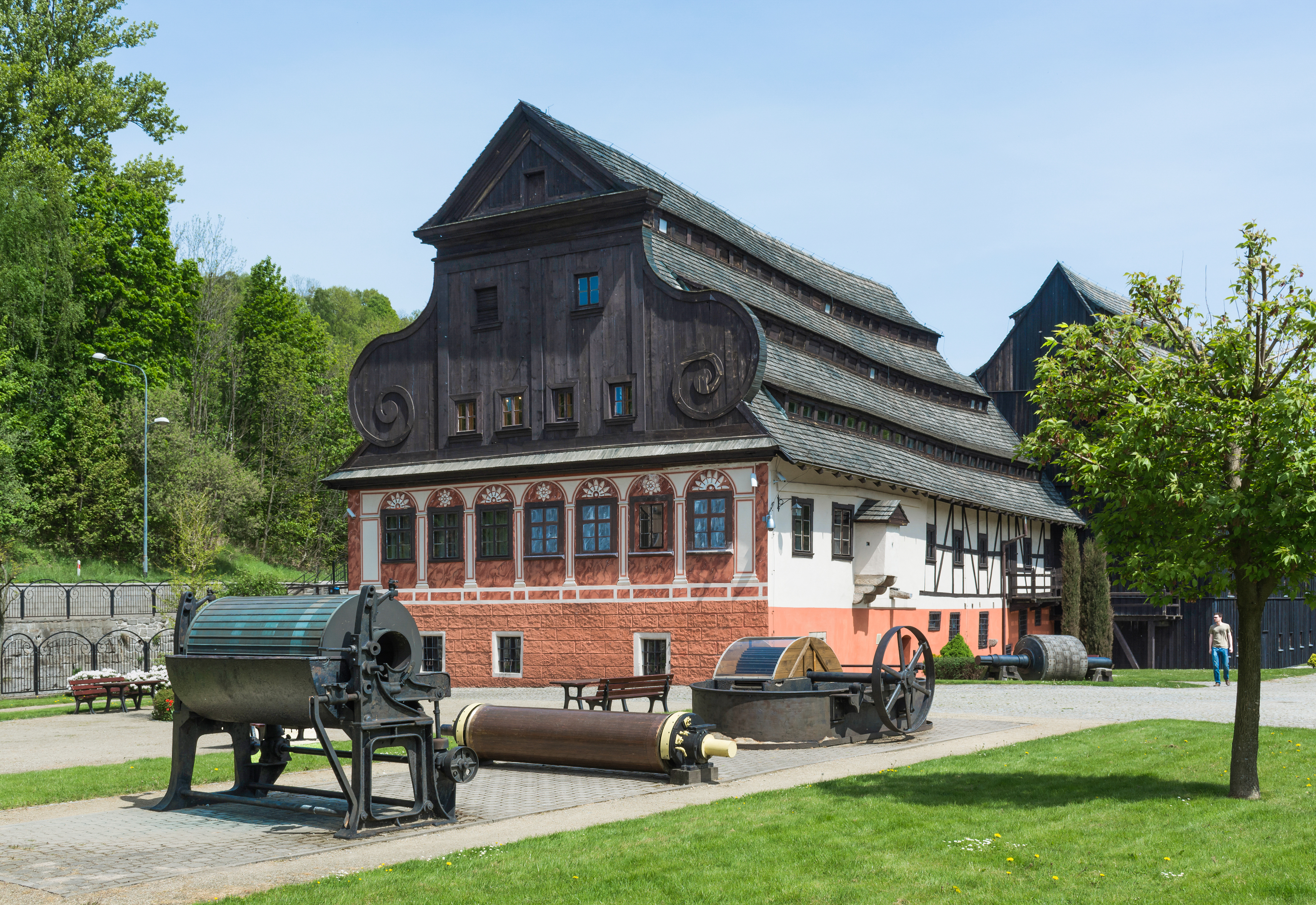
Museum of Papermaking

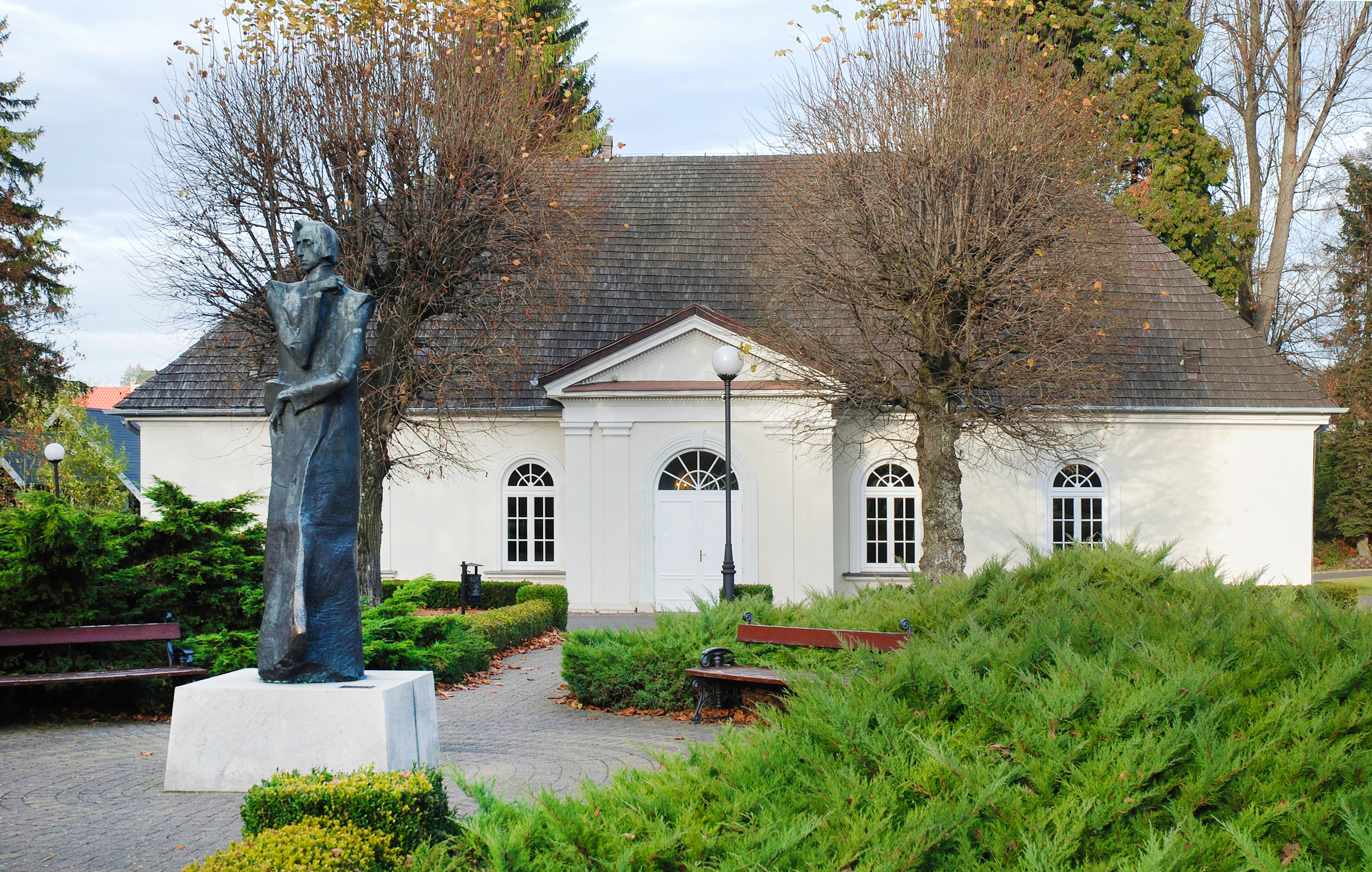
Fryderyk Chopin Theatre

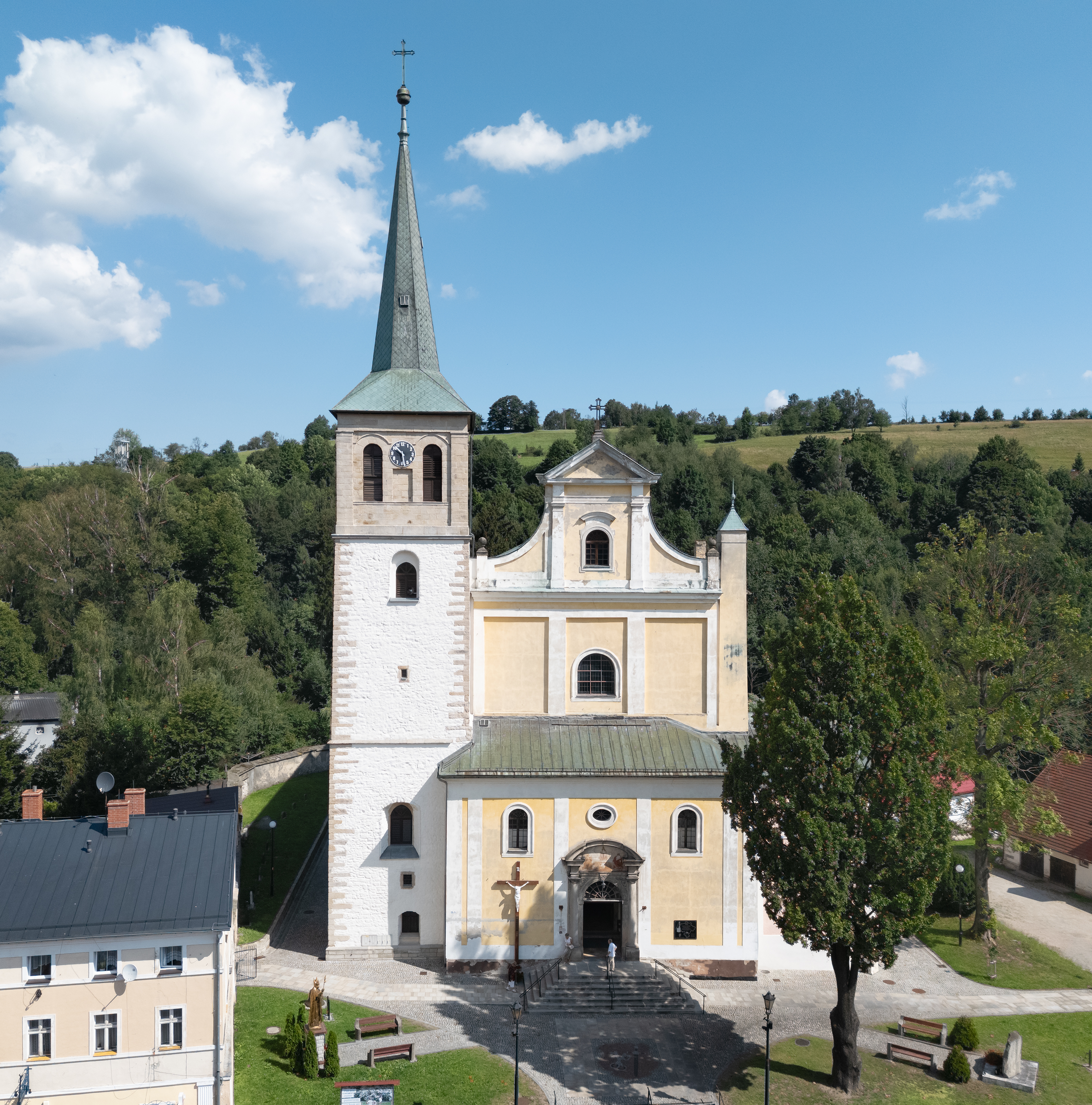
Saints Peter and Paul church

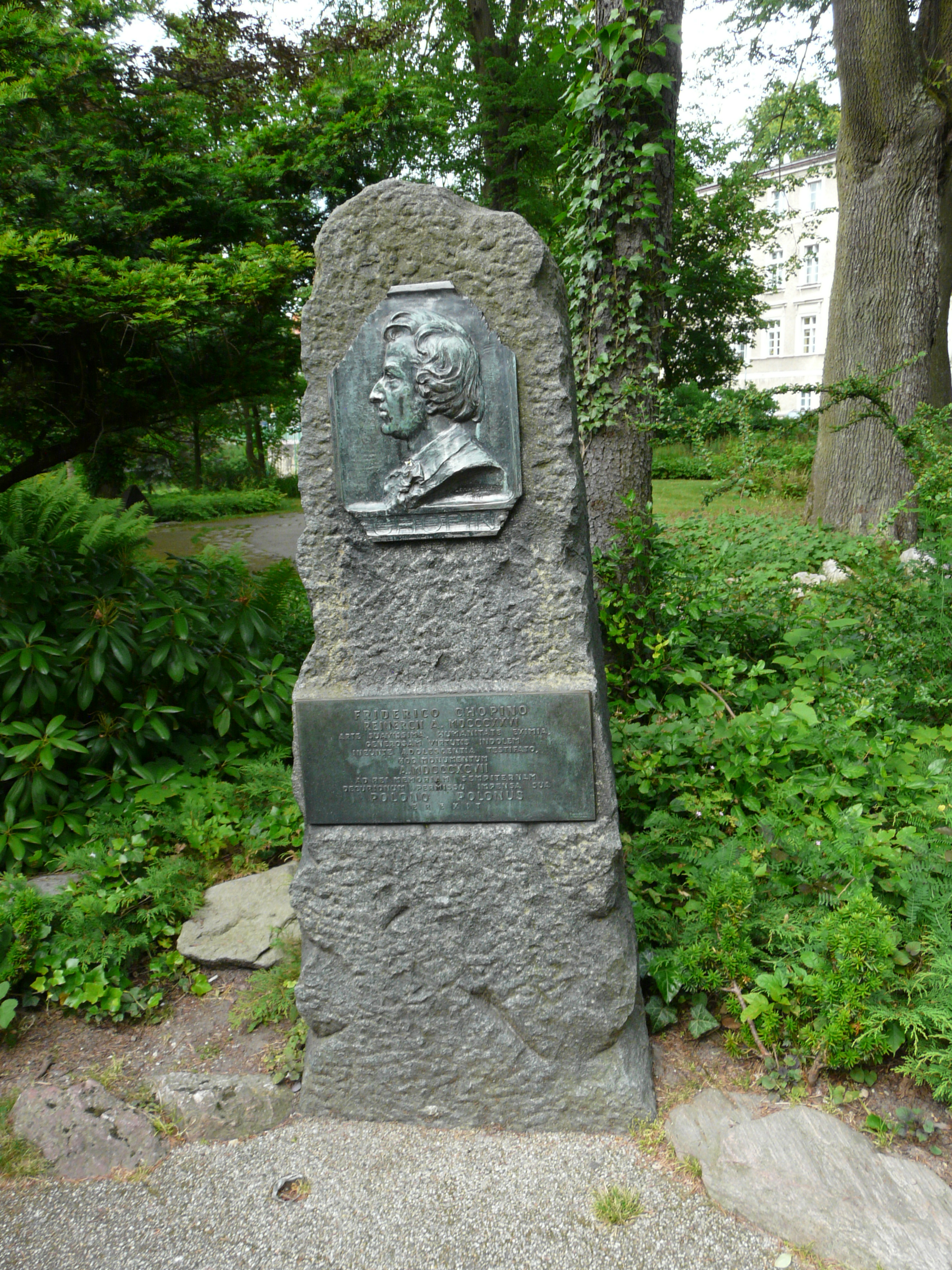
Chopin memorial from 1897

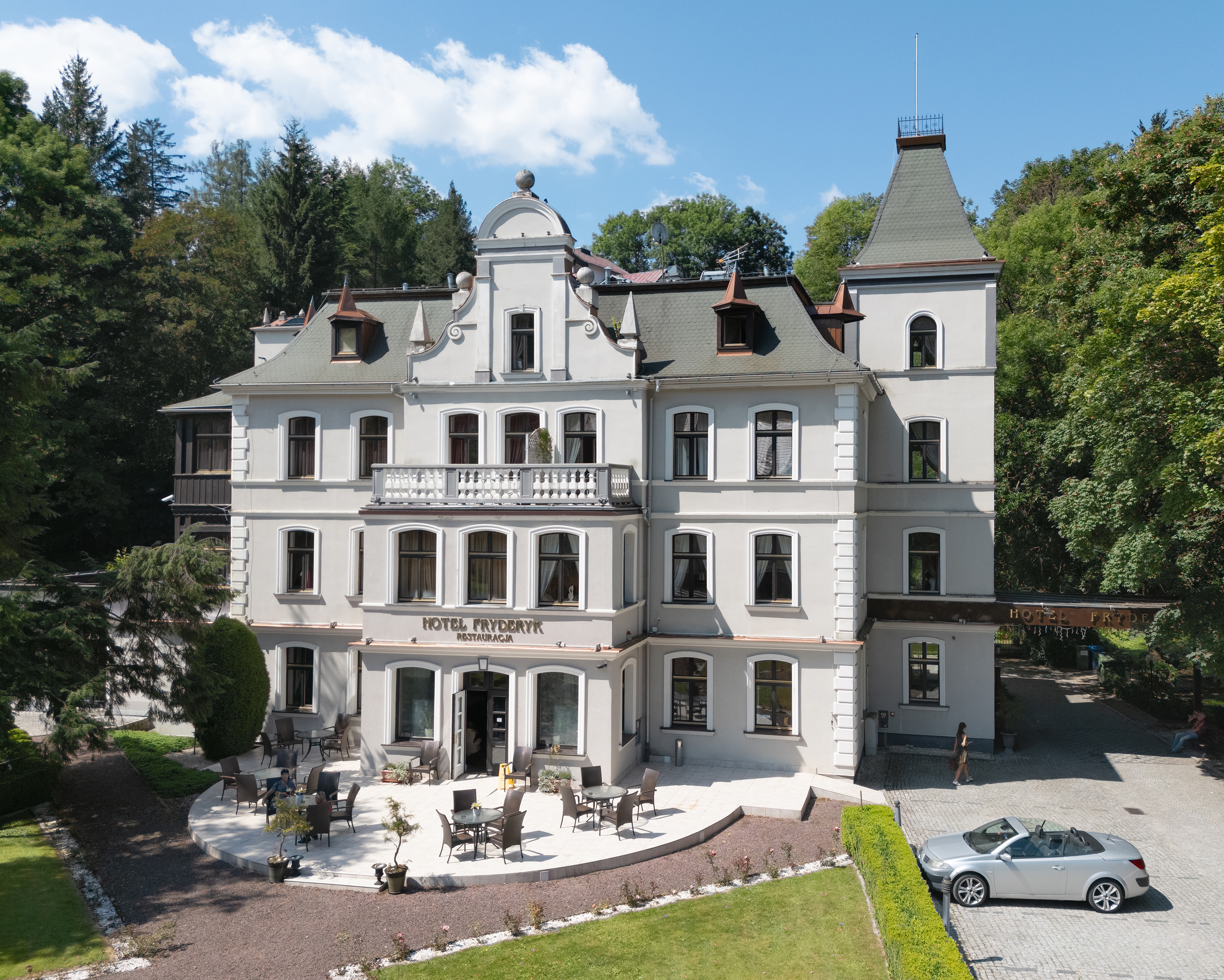
The Fryderyk Hotel

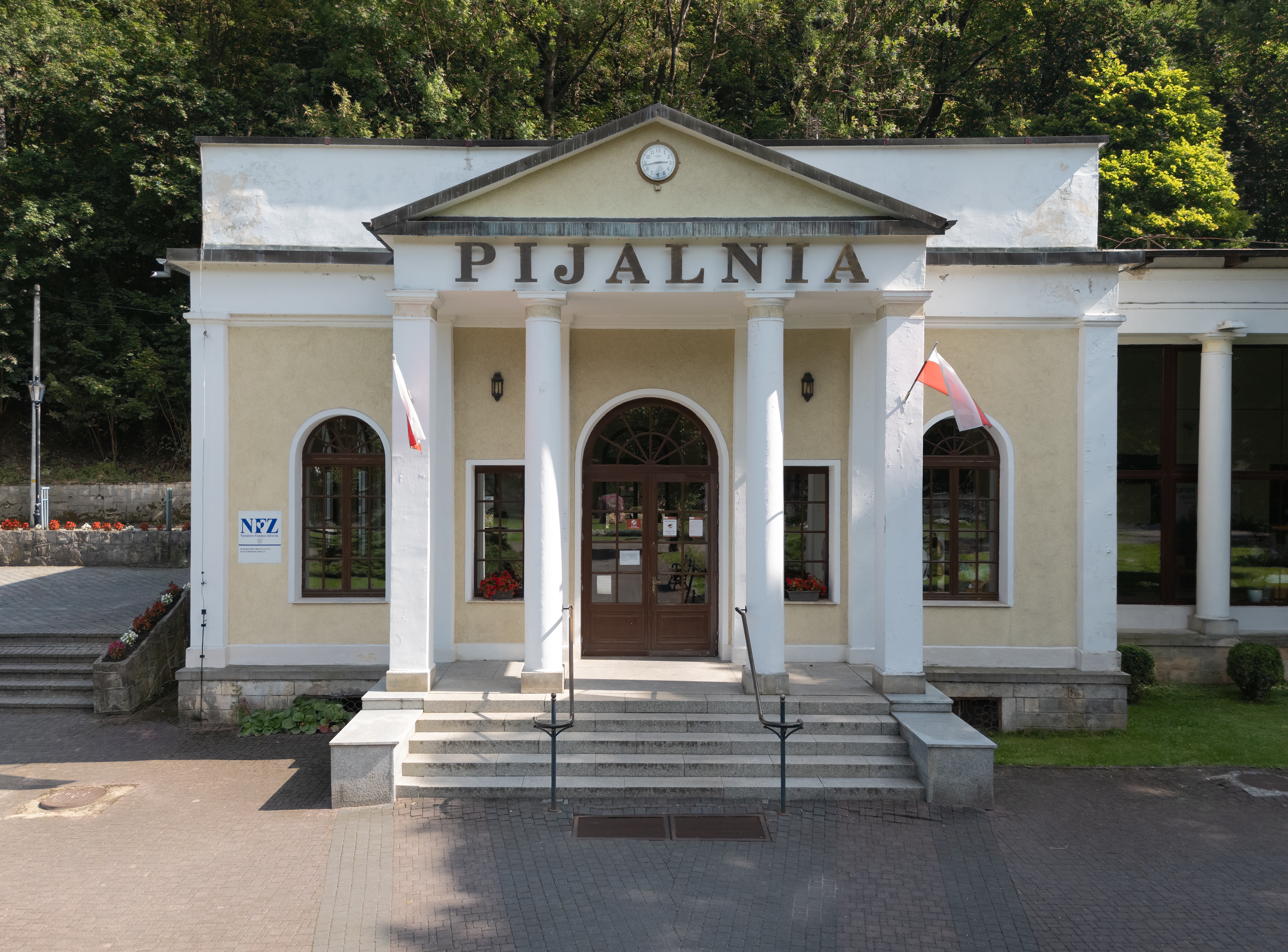
The spa park

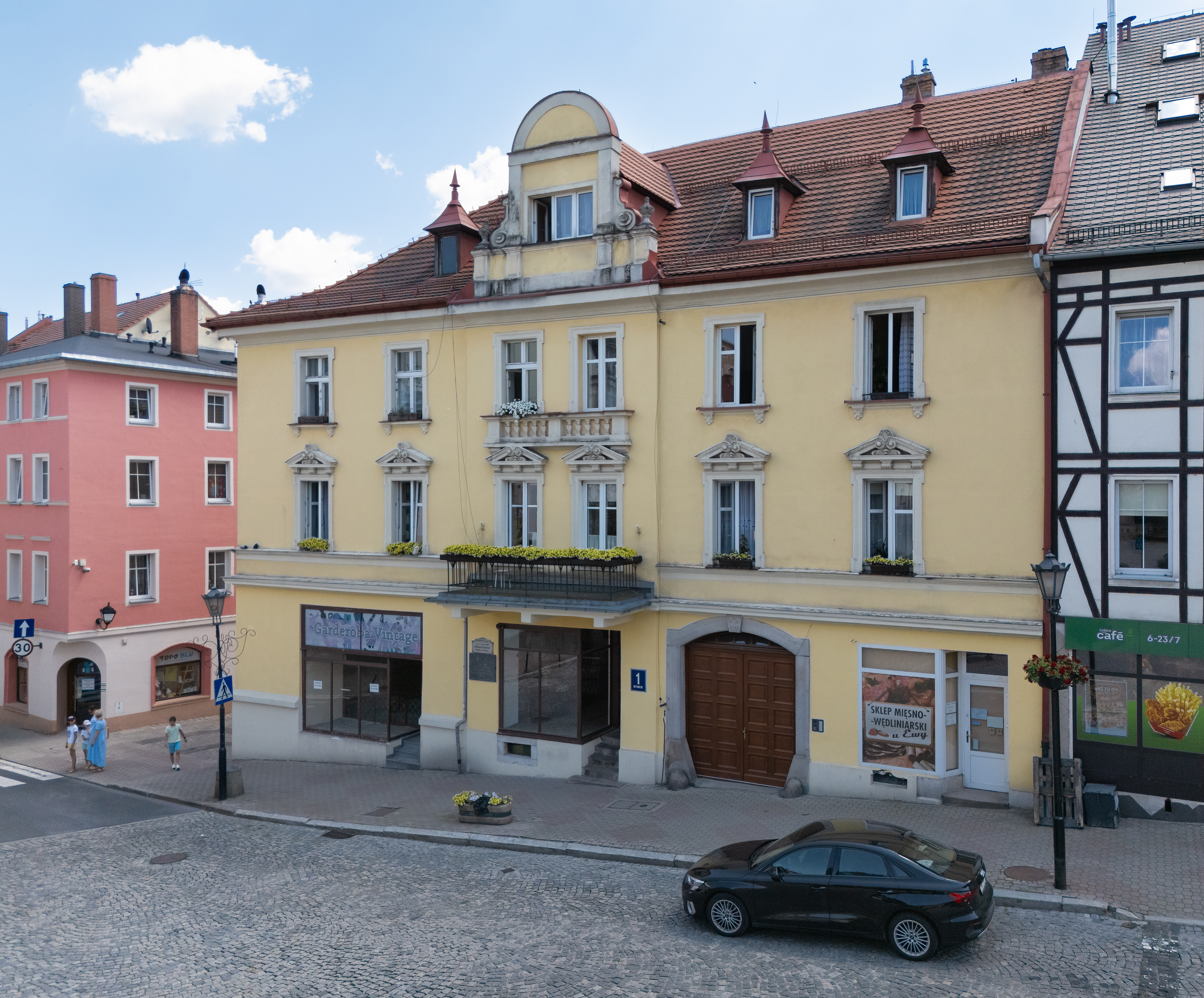
Place of stay of King John II Casimir Vasa

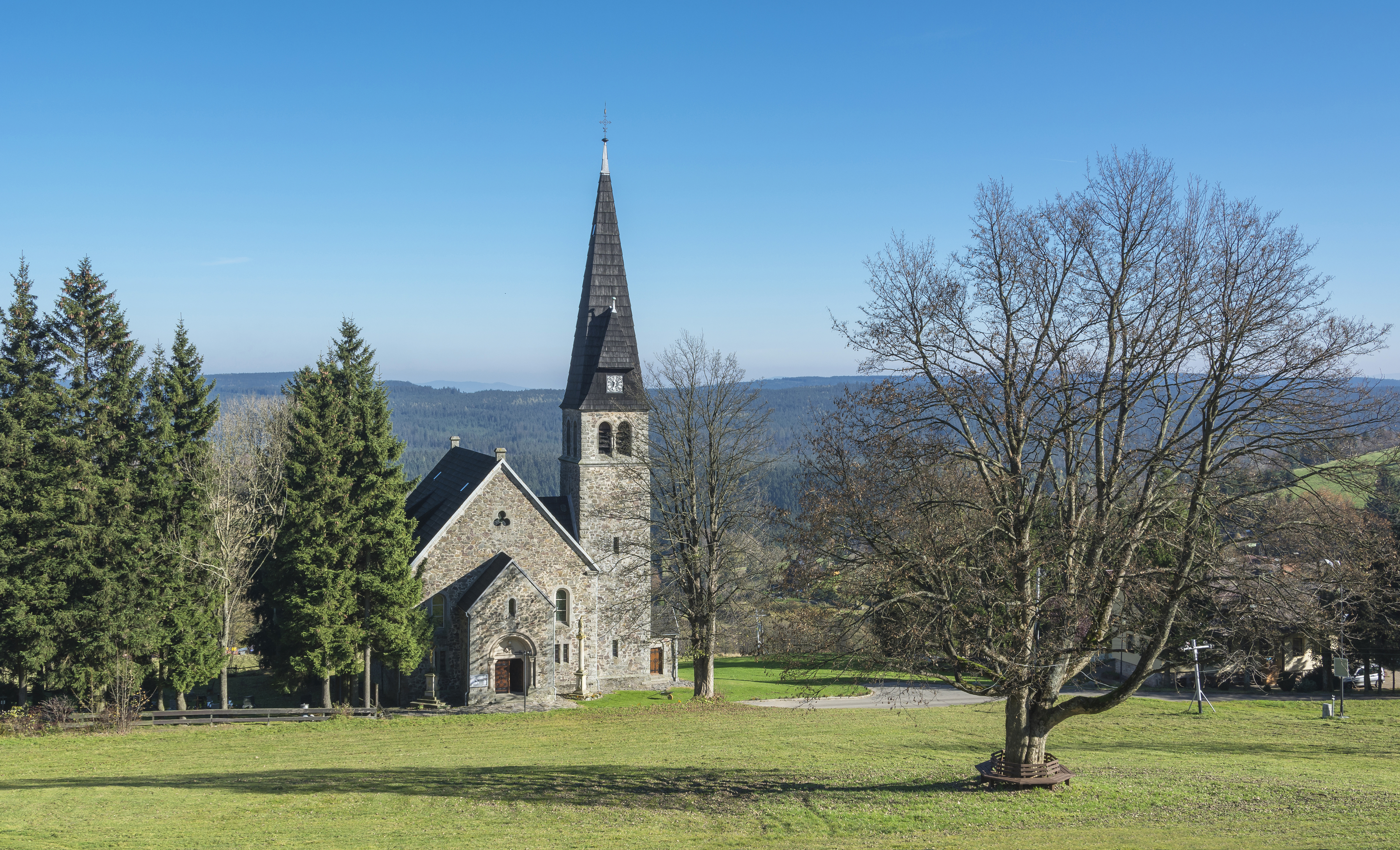
Saint Anne's Church in the district of Zieleniec

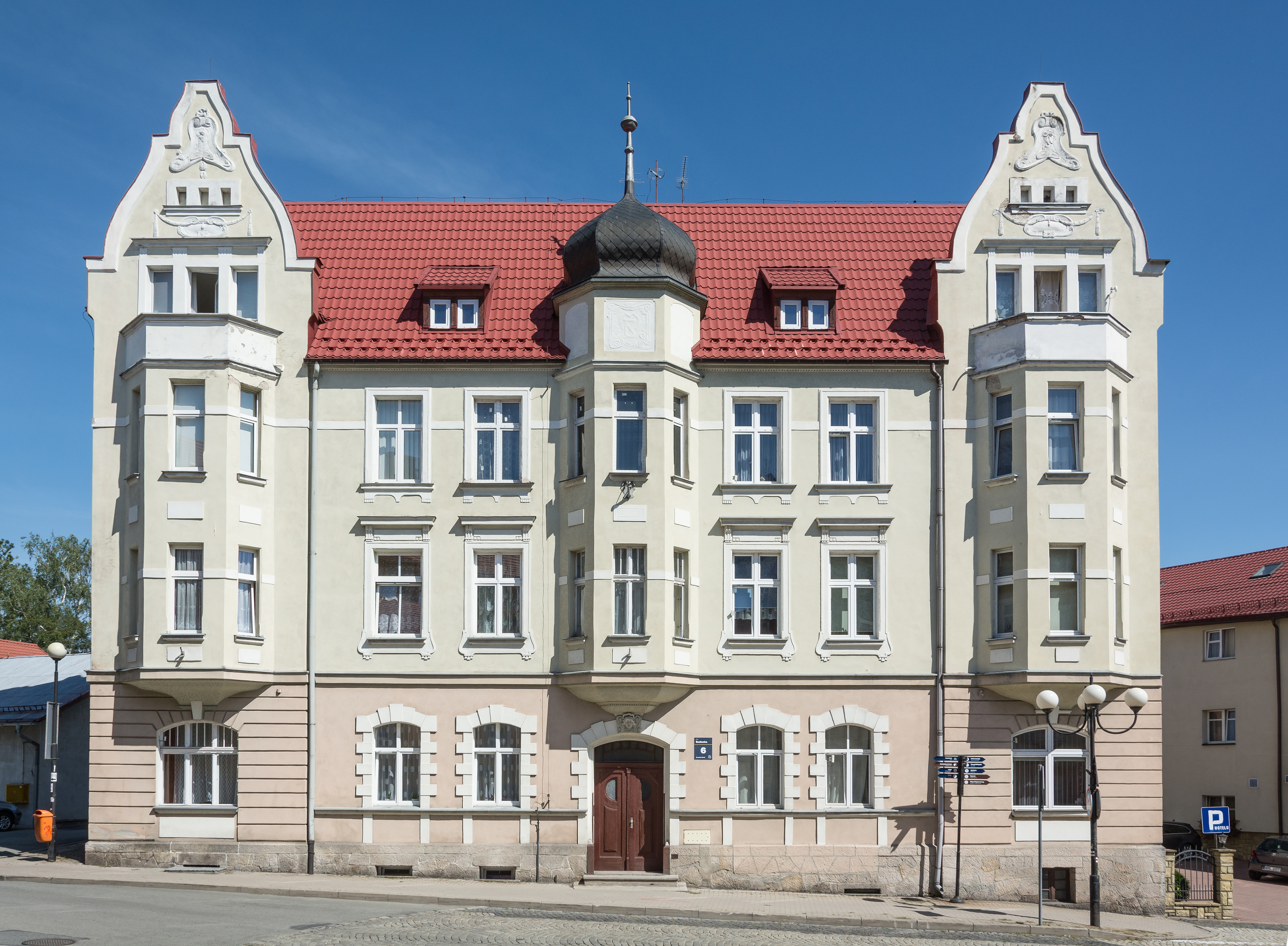
A historic townhouse on Sudecka Street
