= Museum of Papermaking in Duszniki-Zdrój =

Museum in Duszniki-Zdrój, Poland

The Museum of Papermaking
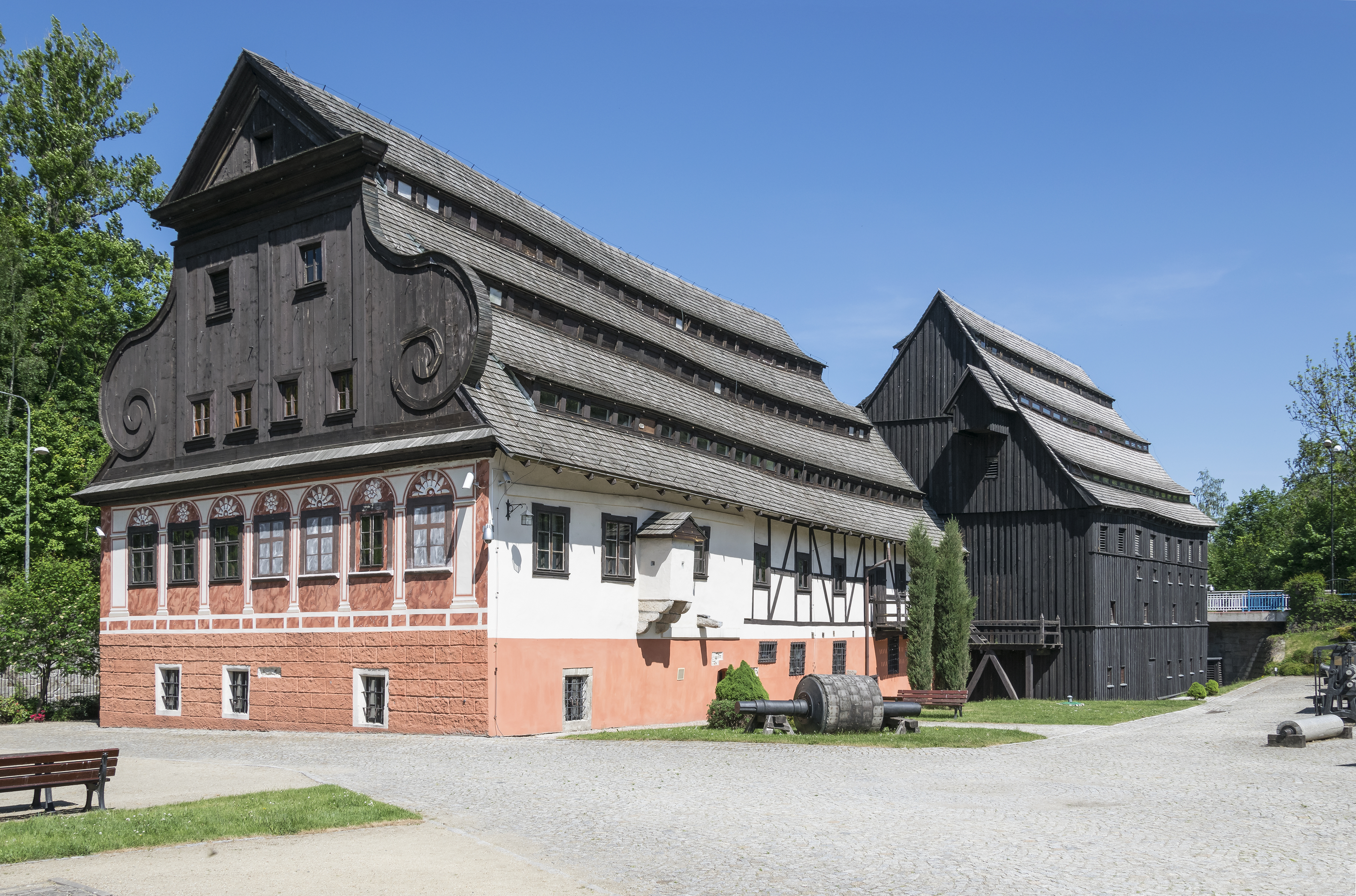
- Established: before 1562
- Location: Duszniki-Zdrój, Poland
- Coordinates: 50.4044°N 16.3957°E
- Type: History of paper and papermaking
- Director: Maciej Szymczyk
- Website: http://muzeumpapiernictwa.pl/en

Historic Monument of Poland
- Designated: 2011-09-20
- Reference no.: Dz. U. z 2011 r. Nr 217, poz. 1282

The Museum of Papermaking in Duszniki-Zdrój (Polish: Muzeum Papiernictwa) is a historical museum located in the spa town of Duszniki-Zdrój in the Lower Silesian Voivodeship, southwestern Poland. It was founded in 1968 in an old 16th-century paper mill on the Bystrzyca Dusznicka river.

== History ==
The Paper Mill in Duszniki had been erected prior to 1562 and its first recorded owner was Ambrosius Tepper. During the flood in 1601 the paper mill suffered partial destruction. The contemporary owner, Gregor Kretschmer, reconstructed the plant and resumed the production of paper. On this basis, one may assume that the existing paper mill is one of the oldest preserved and operational structures of its kind in Europe. For the Kretschmer family, paper manufacture became a source of immense wealth and elevated social status, as confirmed in the year 1607 by Emperor Rudolf II Habsburg, who allowed Gregor and Georg Kretschmer to use their own coat of arms, which was followed shortly afterwards by their inclusion among the country's nobility. The paper mill was subsequently purchased by the Heller family in 1706 along with the associated privilege to produce handmade paper.

In the year 1750, Anton Benedikt Heller received the title of royal papermaker. From 1772 onwards, the mill remained in the hands of the Ossendorf family until its acquisition by the Wiehr family in 1822. It was only in 1939 that the family chose to part with their property, which was acquired by the municipal authorities of the town of Duszniki-Zdrój. The authorities intended to convert the building into a museum; this plan would only reach fruition in 1968, however, when the Papermaking Museum was officially opened to the public. The manufacture of handmade paper was interrupted in 1905, although the production process was later reinstated in 1971, forming a vital part of the museum display. The facility also accepts special orders for this type of paper.

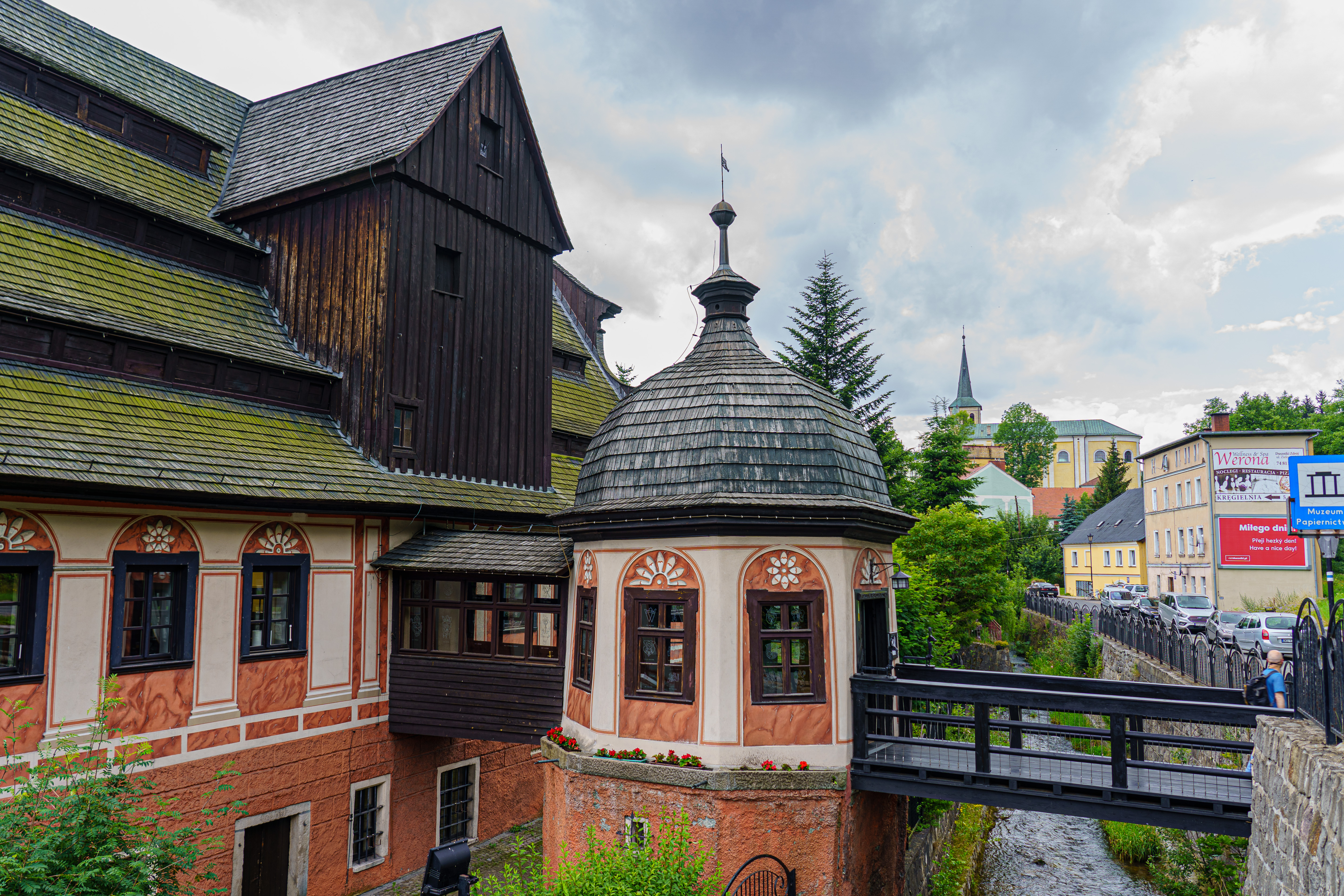
Entry to the paper mill via a bridge

The paper mill is situated on the Bystrzyca Dusznicka river bank. The structure consists of three interconnected buildings. The paper mill building itself features a brick ground-floor level section above which rises the upper portion of the building, parts of which feature a wattle-and-daub structure. The entire design is crowned by wooden gables adorned with massive volutes. The eastern side of the building is adjoined by the post-and-beam drying house, its walls clad with weatherboards. Both buildings are covered with tall gable roofs featuring a distinctive multi-stepped design, their surfaces clad with wood shingles. The slatted vents positioned at several levels of the roofs are a distinguishing feature of all paper mills of the period. In the mid-18th century, an octagonal entrance pavilion was added on the northern side of the compound, linked to the paper mill building by a wooden covered walkway which spans the river canal beneath.

In the late 18th and early 19th century, the paper mill was redesigned, receiving a highly decorative façade which sets the complex in Duszniki-Zdrój apart from similar structures surviving in Europe today. The third-storey rooms of the paper mill building are of a highly representational character. Both the walls and the ceiling of this part of the edifice are adorned with painted decorations which were first discovered in 1969 and then subjected to conservation works in the years 1986–87. These wall paintings were executed back in the third quarter of the 18th century at the request of the royal papermaker Johann Joseph Ossendorf and were designed as a trompe l’œil decoration combining various features of architectural, landscape and figurative painting. One of the paintings portrays an Old Testament scene, with Potiphar's wife unsuccessfully attempting to seduce Joseph. This scene is an obvious reference to the man who commissioned the painted decorations as well as to his elevated social status. The use of decorations of this kind inside what was still, in the essence, a manufacturing facility harking back to the era when the industrial revolution was still a long way off is truly unique and has no counterparts anywhere else in Europe.

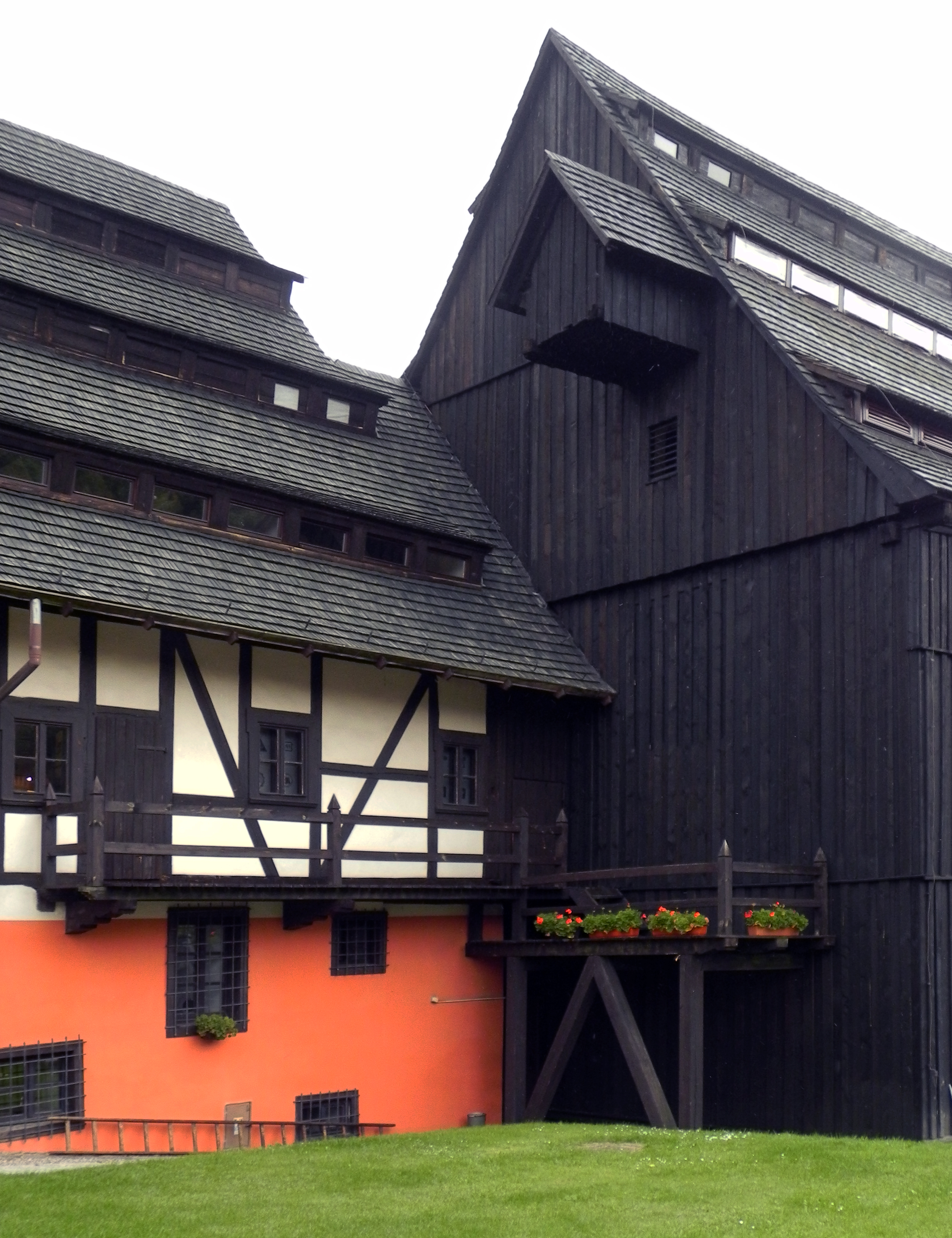
Architectural detail of the paper mill with distinctive timber framing

The Paper Mill in Duszniki-Zdrój is one of the dozen surviving paper mills in Western Europe which still engage in the production of traditional, handmade paper. The unique age-old technique, still in constant use at the paper mill, involves the manual draining of fibre solution to form individual sheets of paper. The distinguishing features of typical paper mill compounds, such as the paper mill proper and the drying house, are both still extant and feature a highly distinctive spatial layout. Remnants of the mill-race, which used to provide the energy necessary to propel the equipment inside the paper mill, have also survived to this day.

The museum displays mainly exhibitions on the history of paper. Since 2001 the museum has been organizer of "Święto Papieru" (The Holiday of Paper) – a festival promoting the knowledge and importance of paper, print, bookbinding and contemporary art. It is the biggest, two-day event, which has been organised at the last weekend of July – the anniversary of the museum establishment. The event promotes the paper mill, the authors of regional products and the active tourism. The assumption of the Paper Festival is providing the visitors’ active participation in the workshops and the possibility of taking the effects of their work home. The setting of stands is designed to enable the visitors to begin with getting to know the materials and paper primary products and then to go through paper making (done on their own), investigating its properties (historic metrological apparatus), getting to know the printing techniques (gravure and relief printing) and the methods of traditional paper ornamentation (marbling, shibori, batik). Additionally, there are numerous competitions with valuable prizes – both skill games (such as toilet paper throw) and knowledge games connected with the knowledge about the paper and the Museum of Papermaking. The complement of the attractions are the paper art, craft and regional products stalls. Every year during the Festival, there are also additional exhibitions of paper art.

The paper mill is one of Poland's official national Historic Monuments (Pomnik historii), as designated October 12, 2011 and tracked by the National Heritage Board of Poland.

== Architecture ==
The paper mill is one of the most architecturally valuable industrial monuments in Europe. It is characteristic for its shingle roofing trimmed with a baroque volute from the west and the original entrance pavilion and the 17-19th century wall paintings in the interior. The tradition of papermaking in Duszniki dates back to the 16th century; the first record about the paper mill comes from 1562, and tells about the sale of his shares in the moulding room by Ambrosius Tepper to Nicolas Kretschmer.

The original paper mill was destroyed in the flood in 1601. The mill was rebuilt and making of paper was resumed in 1605. The museum was opened for visitors on July 26, 1968, and three years later paper production by hand was launched on show. The moulding room soon became an attraction drawing tens of thousands of tourists every year. The flood of 1998 inflicted a great damage on the paper mill. Water washed the foundations of the drying room and deposited tons of mud and debris inside the building. The damage was repaired thanks to the financial assistance from the Polish government. In 2007-2008 due to extensive alterations, the museum was adapted to the needs of disabled visitors.

== UNESCO (Tentative List) ==
In 2019 inscribed on the Polish UNESCO information list (Tenative List)

== Permanent exhibition ==
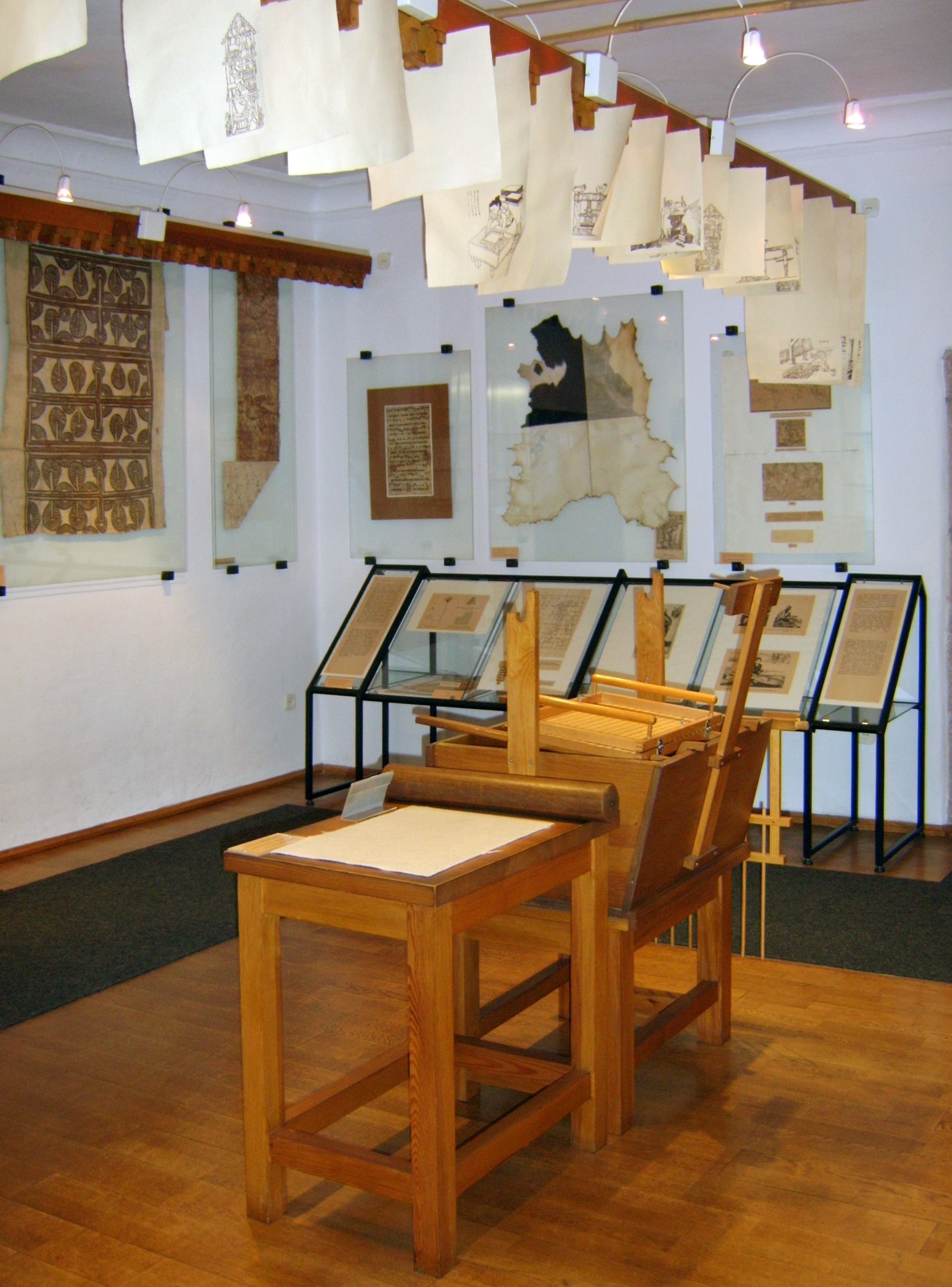

The museum is the only preserved and still running building of this kind in Poland and one of the very few in Central Europe. The current exhibition features:

- the beautifully restored, shingle-roofed building of the paper mill – a unique monument of technology,
- production on show of handmade paper: "the hollander" for breaking cellulose, moulding vats, moulding frames and presses, etc.
- exhibitions on development of papermaking technology including sheets with watermarks and filigrees, historic moulding frames, models of papermaking machines and one of the greatest world-wide collections of historic apparatuses for measuring paper characteristics,
- exhibition on the history of painting,
- exhibition of original large-size papermaking machines,
- garden with fibrous plants used in paper production.

One can make their own piece of paper here:

- museum lessons are organized for groups,
- individual visitors can take part in papermaking workshops.

The museum outlet offers on sale:

- watercolour paper, drawing paper, printing and stationery paper up to A2 size,
- artistic paper ornamented with flowers and arms of County of Kladsko.
- business cards, stationery and other items up to A3 size, set by hand and printed on the premises.
- unique poetry albums in low stock,
- handmade paper with a specific watermark according to a client's design or idea made to order.

The museum also makes a renowned centre of papermaking history research.

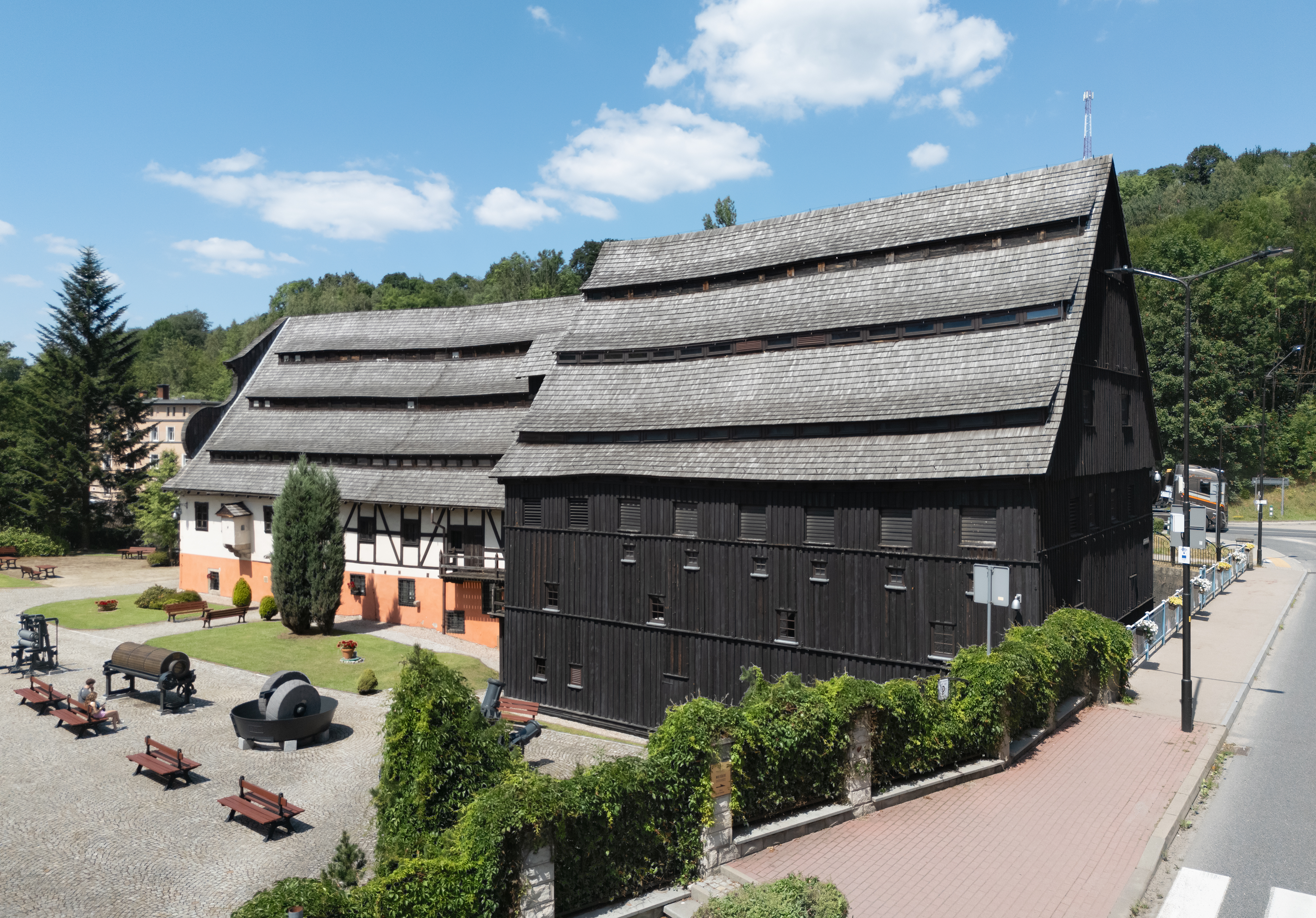

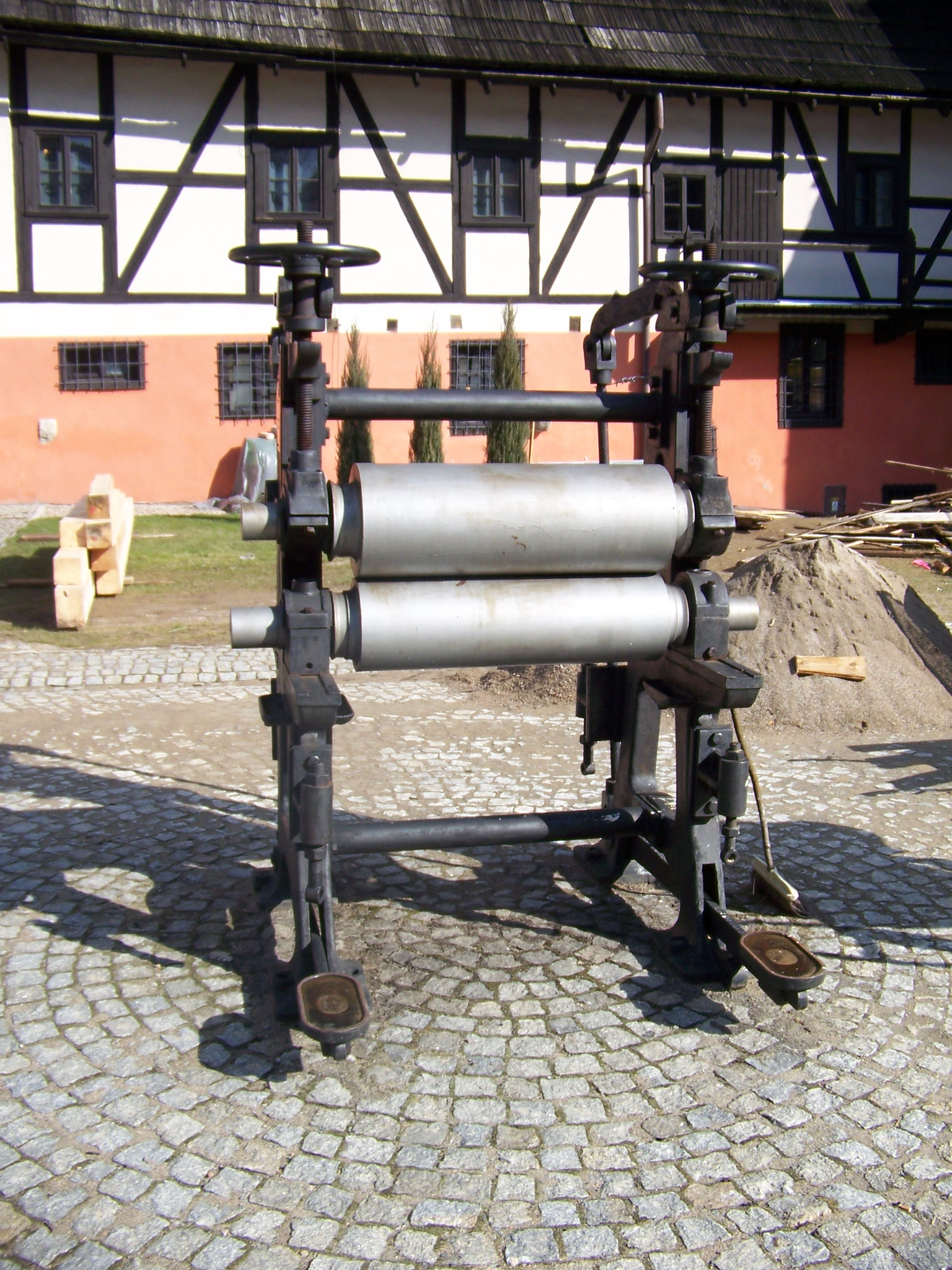

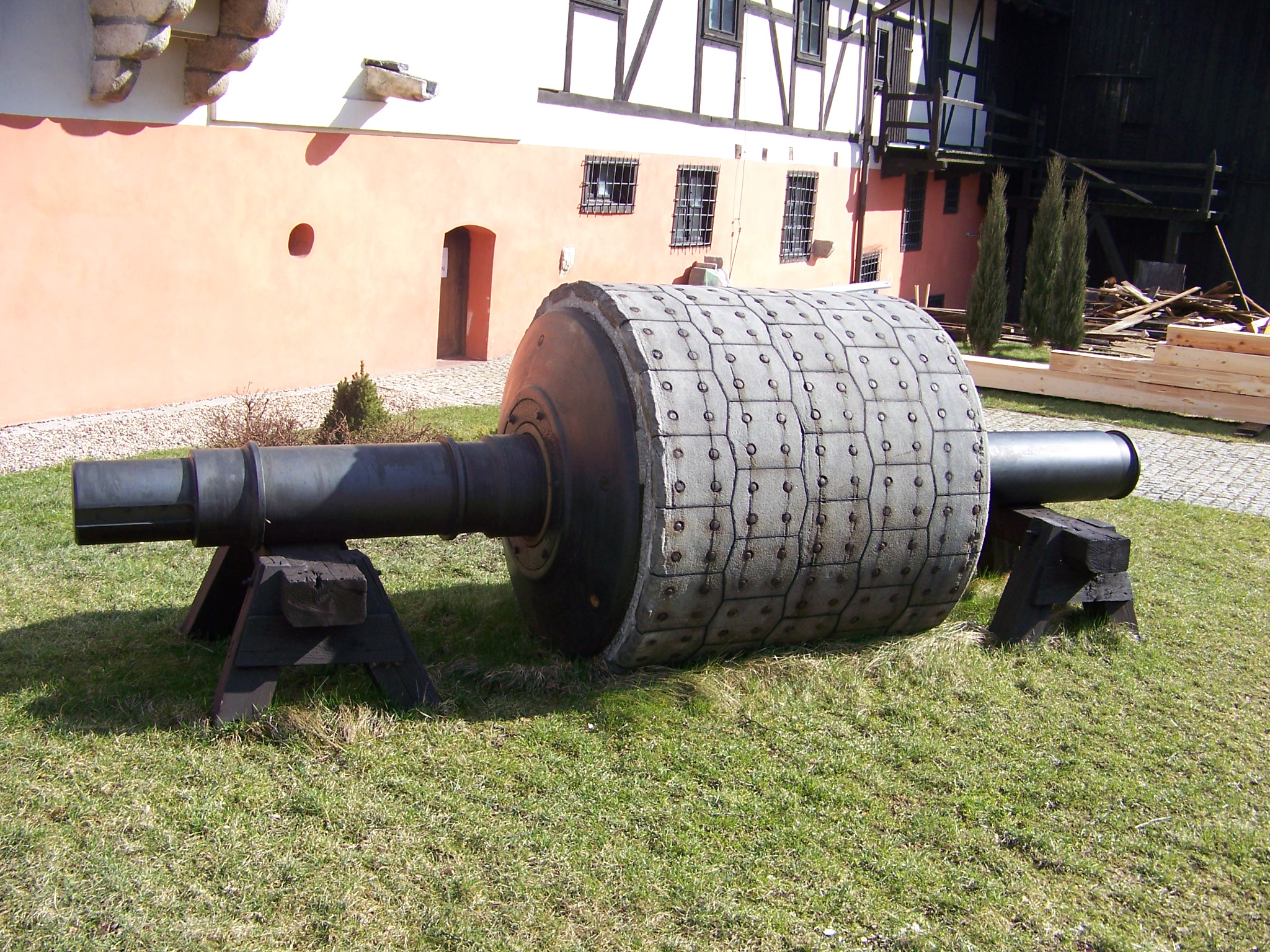

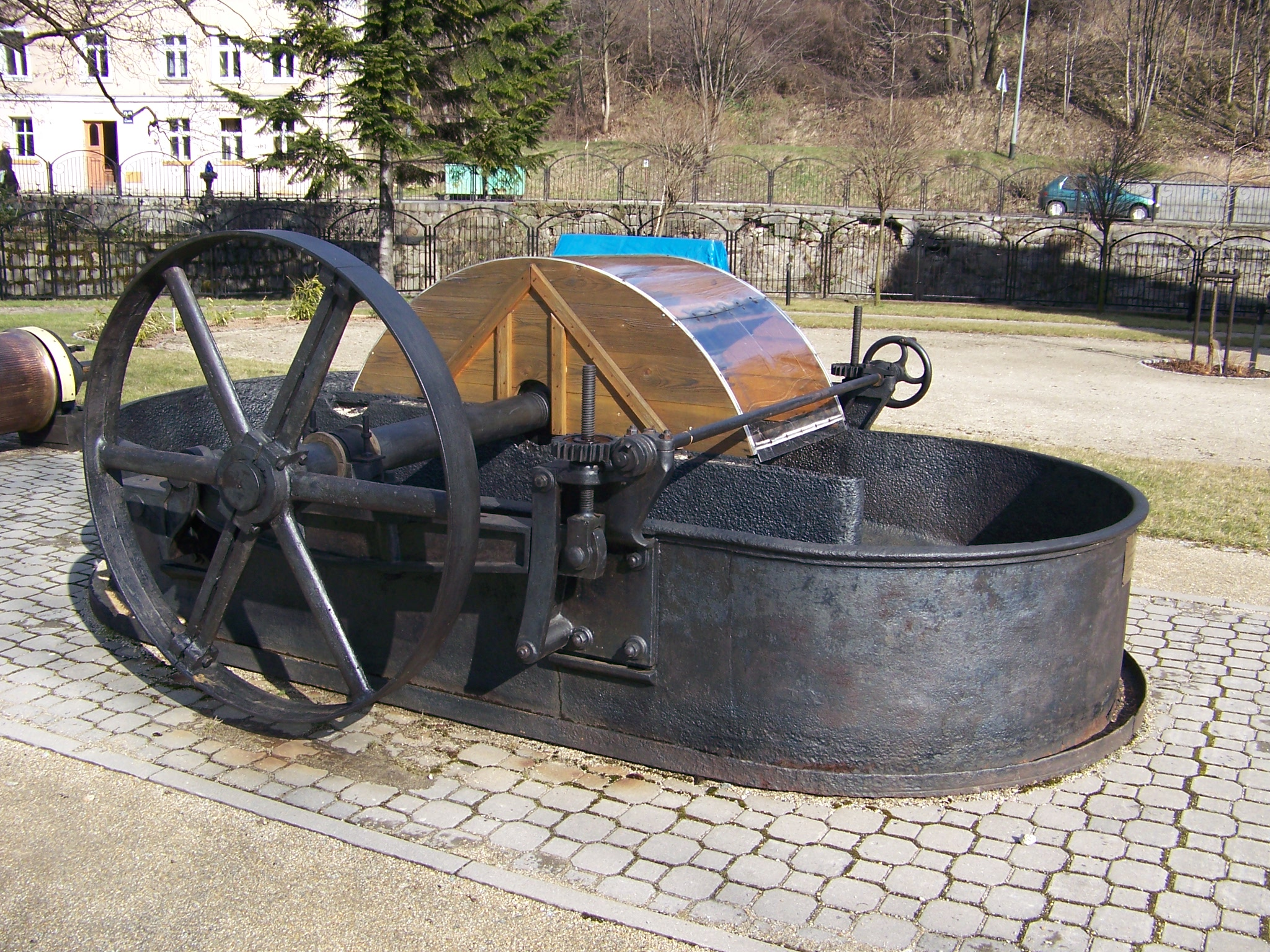

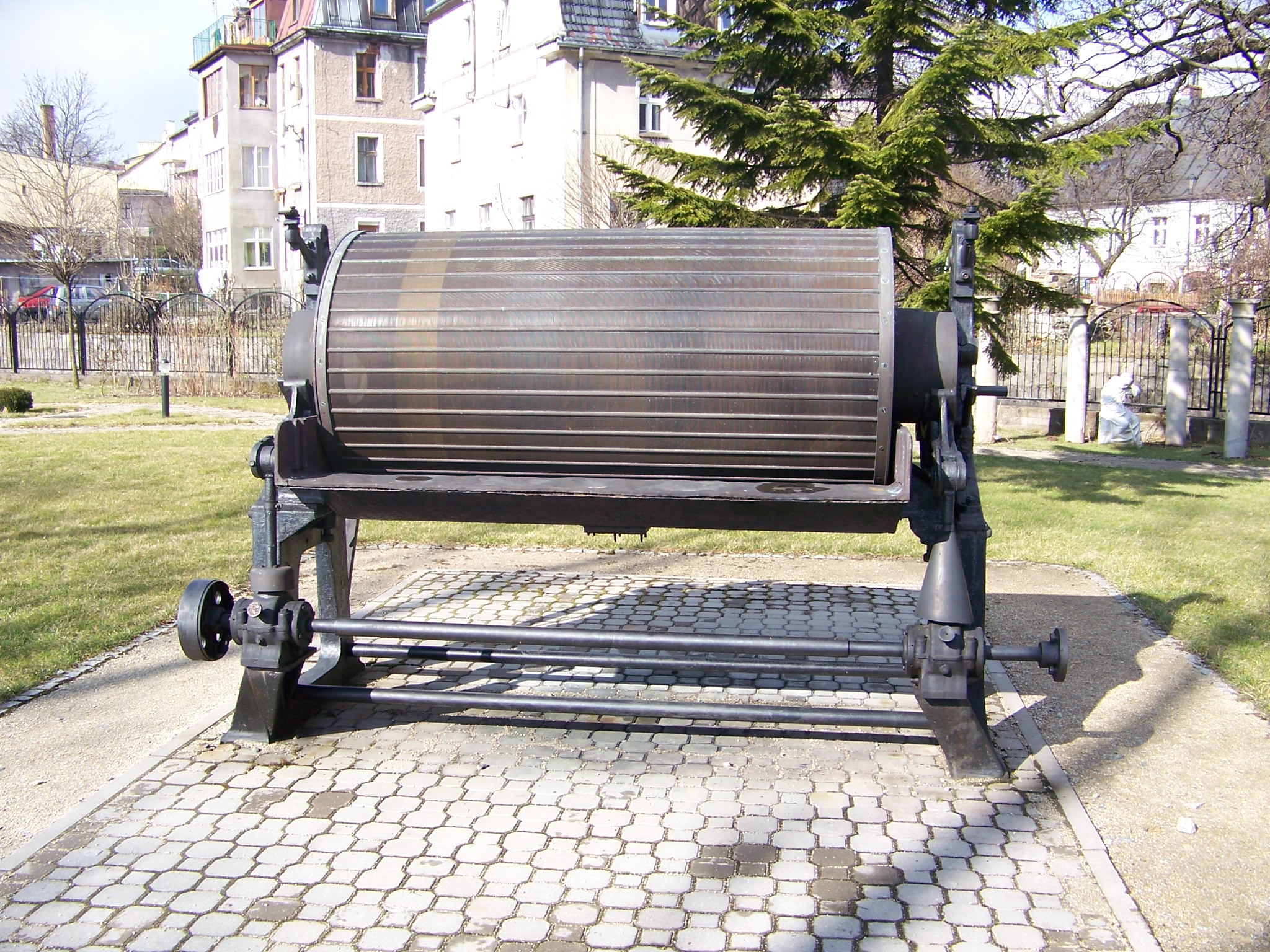
