= Olešnice v Orlických horách =

- Municipality
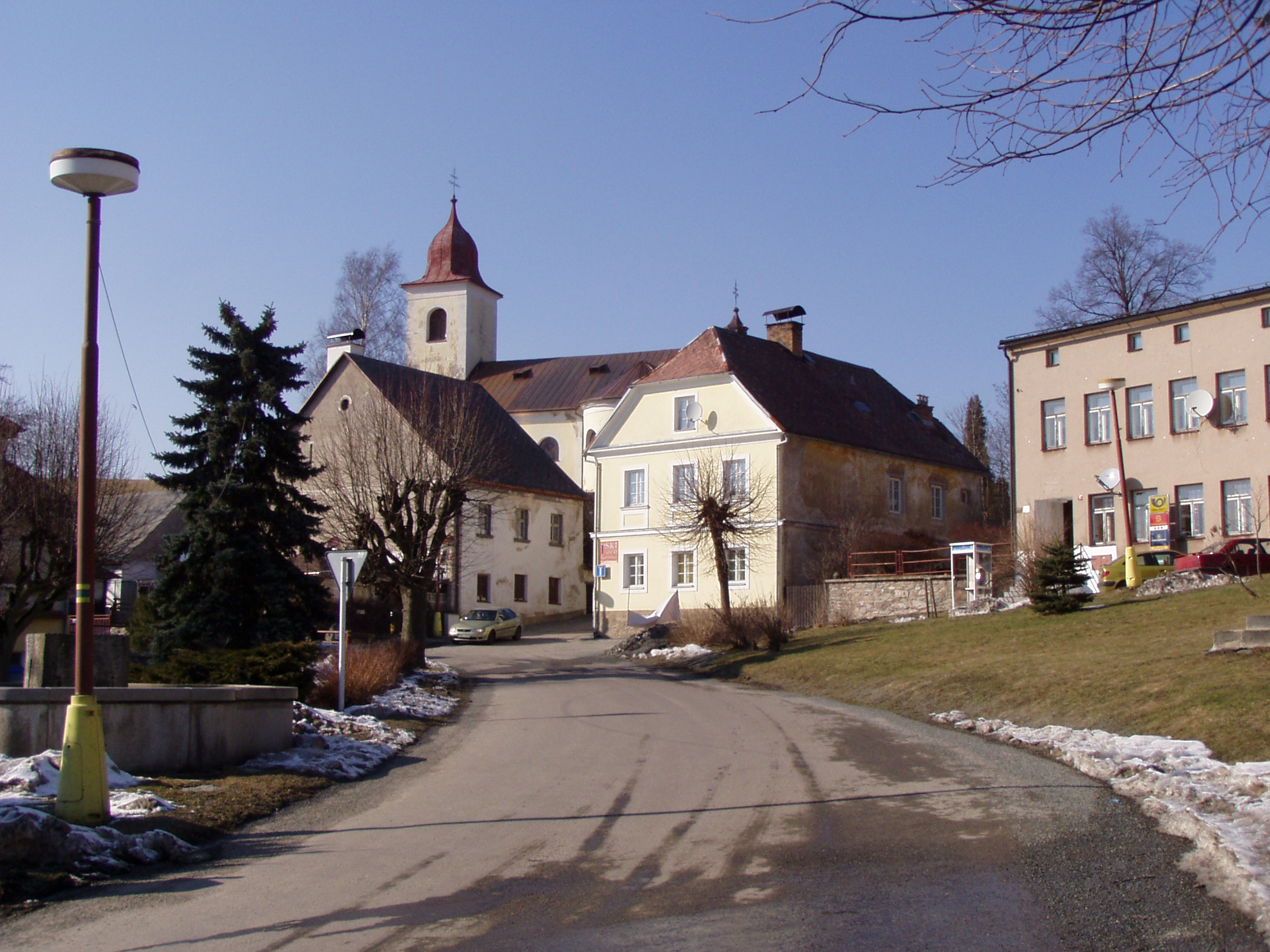
- Centre of Olešnice v Orlických horách

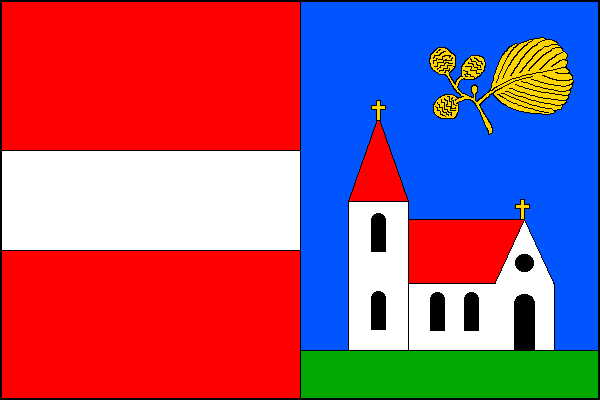
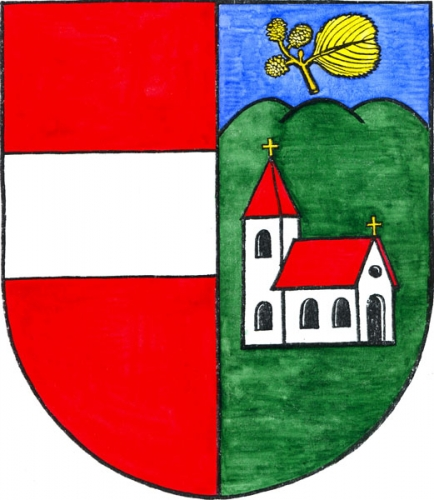
- Flag Coat of arms

- Location in the Czech Republic
- Coordinates: 50°22′23″N 16°18′36″E
- Country: Czech Republic
- Region: Hradec Králové
- District: Rychnov nad Kněžnou
- First mentioned: 1369

Area
  - Total: 14.30 km^{2} (5.52 sq mi)
- Elevation: 593 m (1,946 ft)

Population (2026-01-01)
  - Total: 389
  - Density: 27.2/km^{2} (70.5/sq mi)
- Time zone: UTC+1 (CET)
  - Summer (DST): UTC+2 (CEST)
- Postal code: 517 83
- Website: www.olesnice.net

Olešnice v Orlických horách is a municipality and village in Rychnov nad Kněžnou District in the Hradec Králové Region of the Czech Republic. It has about 400 inhabitants.

== Demographics ==
Historical population
Year	Pop.	±%
1869	2,295	—
1880	2,155	−6.1%
1890	2,282	+5.9%
1900	2,180	−4.5%
1910	2,041	−6.4%
1921	1,579	−22.6%
1930	1,425	−9.8%
1950	597	−58.1%
1961	595	−0.3%
1970	586	−1.5%
1980	547	−6.7%
1991	542	−0.9%
2001	479	−11.6%
2011	446	−6.9%
2021	392	−12.1%
Source: Censuses
