= Farma season 11 =

Season of television series

Farma
- Season 11
- Presented by: Eva "Evelyn" Kramerová
- No. of days: 15 weeks
- No. of housemates: 20
- Winner: Gabriel
- Runner-up: Romana

Release
- Original network: Markíza
- Original release: September 2 – December 13, 2019

Season chronology
- ← Previous; Season 10 Next → Season 12

Farma 11 - East vs West is the 11th season of the Slovak version of The Farm reality television show based on the Swedish television series of the same name. The show was filmed from August 2019 and premiered on September 2, 2019 on Markíza.

== Format ==
Sixteen contestants are chosen from the outside world. This year twist is East Slovakia vs West Slovakia. In each team there are eight contestant. Followed first few weeks another four contestant joined cast. After 6th week, contestants are merged into one group. In first six weeks each group nominated one person who will compete in Farmer of the Week challenge. Since week 7, the Farmer is chosen by the contestant evicted in the previous week.

=== Nomination process ===
The Farmer of the Week nominates two people, one from each group as the Butlers. The others must decide which Butler is the first to go to the Battle. That person then chooses the second person for the Battle and also the type of battle. The Battle winner must win three duels. The Battle loser is evicted from the game.

Ages stated are at time of contest.

Contestant	Age	Background	Hometown	Starting team	Status	Finish
Andrea Bobovská	43	Nurse	Gánovce	East	1st Evicted on Week 1	20th
Martina Kovalčíková	30	Administrative worker	Košice	East	Evacuated on Week 2	19th
Michal Rajcsányi	24	Physiotherapist	Bratislava	West	3rd Evicted on Week 3	18th
Martin Kollár	20	Student	Handlová	West	4th Evicted on Week 5	17th
Peter Gyűrűsi	45	Chimney-sweep	Nové Zámky	West	5th Evicted on Week 6	16th
Mário Krkoška	27	Mechanic	Čadca	West	6th Evicted on Week 7	15th
Miroslava Csorbová	19	Croupier	Košice	East	7th Evicted on Week 8	14th
Andrea Matejčíková	34	Hairstylist	Košice	East	8th Evicted on Week 9	13th
Matej Jurkovič	41	Lifestyle couch	Bratislava	West	Ejected on Week 10	12th
Nicoletta Tóthová	24	Gastronomy	Veľké Kapušany	East	9th Evicted on Week 10	11th
Vladimír Hudáček	37	Farmer	Kalnište	East	10th Evicted on Week 11	10th
Rastislav Mojsej	40	Electrician	Hrašovík	East	11th Evicted on Week 12	9th
Martin Mihálik	22	Construction worker	Andrejová	East	12th Evicted on Week 13	8th
Iveta Maászová	45	Nail Designer	Modra	West	13th Evicted on Week 14	7th
Nikola Prsteková	25	Unemployed	Holíč	West	14th Evicted on Week 15	6th
Barbora Bednaričová	22	Student	Bratislava	West	15th Evicted on Week 15	5th
Kristína "Kristi Dali" Lengyelová	32	Photomodel	Senec/Los Angeles	West	16th Evicted on Week 15	4th
Radovan Dulin	38	Rescue worker	Dunajská Lužná/Poprad	East	2nd Runner-up on Week 15	3rd
Romana Košťálová	23	Barmaid	Bratislava	West	Runner-up on Week 15	2nd
Gabriel Sedláček	23	Family business	Košice	East	Winner on Week 15	1st

=== Nominations ===
	Week 1	Week 2	Week 3	Week 4	Week 5	Week 6	Week 7	Week 8	Week 9	Week 10	Week 11	Week 12	Week 13	Week 14	Week 15		Final
Farmer of the Week (Immunity)	Gabriel	Peter	Radovan	Gabriel	Romana	Kristi	Matej	Romana	Matej	Matej; Iveta	Martin M.	Gabriel	Gabriel	Gabriel	None		
Buttlers	Andrea; Martin	Vladimír; Michal	Rastislav; Barbora	Radovan; Miroslava; Barbora; Romana	Miroslava; Matej	Radovan; Matej	Romana; Gabriel	Martin M. Miroslava	Rastislav; Romana	Vladimír; Nicoletta	Radovan; Kristi	Radovan; Nikola	Martin M. Iveta	Radovan; Iveta	None		
Gabriel	Farmer of the Week			Farmer of the Week			Buttler; 1st Dueler					Farmer of the Week	Farmer of the Week	Farmer of the Week	2nd in challenge		Winner (Week 15)
Romana				Buttler; 2nd Dueler	Farmer of the Week		Buttler	Farmer of the Week	Buttler; 1st Dueler				2nd Dueler		4th in challenge		Runner-Up (Week 15)
Radovan			Farmer of the Week	Buttler; 1st Dueler		Buttler; 1st Dueler					Buttler	Buttler; 1st Dueler		Buttler	2nd in challenge		2nd Runner-up (Week 15)
Kristi						Farmer of the Week				2nd Dueler	Buttler				1st in challenge		Evicted (Week 15)
Barbora			Buttler	Buttler; 2nd Dueler										2nd Dueler	5th in challenge	Evicted (Week 15)	
Nikola	Not in The Farm										2nd Dueler	Buttler			6th in challenge	Evicted (Week 15)	
Iveta										Farmer of the Week			Buttler	Buttler; 1st Dueler	Evicted (Week 14)		
Martin M.	Not in The Farm							Buttler			Farmer of the Week		Buttler; 1st Dueler	Evicted (Week 13)			
Rastislav			Buttler; 1st Dueler					2nd Dueler	Buttler			2nd Dueler	Evicted (Week 12)				
Vladimír		Buttler; 1st Dueler								Buttler	1st Dueler	Evicted (Week 11)					
Nicoletta										Buttler; 1st Dueler	Evicted (Week 10)						
Matej					Buttler; 1st Dueler	Buttler	Farmer of the Week		Farmer of the Week	Farmer of the Week	Ejected (Week 10)						
Andrea M.	Not in The Farm								2nd Dueler	Evicted (Week 9)							
Miroslava				Buttler; 1st Dueler	Buttler			Buttler; 1st Dueler	Evicted (Week 8)								
Mário	Not in The Farm						2nd Dueler	Evicted (Week 7)									
Peter		Farmer of the Week				2nd Dueler	Evicted (Week 6)										
Martin	Buttler	2nd Dueler	Evicted (Week 2)		2nd Dueler	Evicted (Week 5)											
Michal	2nd Dueler	Buttler	2nd Dueler	Evicted (Week 3)													
Martina			Evacuated (Week 2)														
Andrea	Buttler; 1st Dueler	Evicted (Week 1)															
Evacuated	None	Martina	None														
Ejected	None									Matej	None						
1st Dueler (By Group)	Andrea	Vladimír	Rastislav	Miroslava; Radovan	Matej	Radovan	Gabriel	Miroslava	Romana	Nicoletta	Vladimír	Radovan	Martin M.	Iveta	None		
2nd Dueler (By 1st Dueler)	Michal	Martin	Michal	Barbora; Romana	Martin	Peter	Mário	Rastislav	Andrea M.	Kristi	Nikola	Rastislav	Romana	Barbora	None		
Evicted	Andrea; Lost duel	Martin; Lost duel	Michal; Lost duel	Barbora; Romana; Saved	Martin; Lost duel	Peter; Lost duel	Mário; Lost duel	Miroslava; Lost duel	Andrea M. Lost duel	Nicoletta; Lost duel	Vladimír; Lost duel	Rastislav; Lost duel	Martin M. Lost duel	Iveta; Lost duel	Nikola; Lost challenge	Kristi; Lost duel	Radovan; 2nd Runner-up; Lost final duel
Evicted	Andrea; Lost duel	Martin; Lost duel	Michal; Lost duel	Barbora; Romana; Saved	Martin; Lost duel	Peter; Lost duel	Mário; Lost duel	Miroslava; Lost duel	Andrea M. Lost duel	Nicoletta; Lost duel	Vladimír; Lost duel	Rastislav; Lost duel	Martin M. Lost duel	Iveta; Lost duel	Nikola; Lost challenge	Kristi; Lost duel	Romana; Runner-up; Lost final duel
Evicted	Andrea; Lost duel	Martin; Lost duel	Martin; Returned	Barbora; Romana; Saved	Martin; Lost duel	Peter; Lost duel	Mário; Lost duel	Miroslava; Lost duel	Andrea M. Lost duel	Nicoletta; Lost duel	Vladimír; Lost duel	Rastislav; Lost duel	Martin M. Lost duel	Iveta; Lost duel	Barbora; Lost challenge	Kristi; Lost duel	Gabriel; Winner; Wins final duel

== The game ==
Week	Farmer of the Week	Butlers	1st Dueler	2nd Dueler	Evicted	Finish
1	Gabriel	Andrea; Martin	Andrea	Michal	Andrea	1st Evicted
2	Peter	Vladimír; Michal	Vladimír	Martin	Martina	Evacuated
2	Peter	Vladimír; Michal	Vladimír	Martin	Martin	2nd Evicted
3	Radovan	Rastislav; Barbora	Rastislav	Michal	Martin	Return
3	Radovan	Rastislav; Barbora	Rastislav	Michal	Michal	3rd Evicted
4	Gabriel	Radovan; Miroslava; Barbora; Romana	Barbora; Romana	Radovan; Miroslava	Barbora; Romana	Saved
5	Romana	Miroslava; Matej	Matej	Martin	Martin	4th Evicted
6	Kristi	Radovan; Matej	Radovan	Peter	Peter	5th Evicted
7	Matej	Romana; Gabriel	Gabriel	Mário	Mário	6th Evicted
8	Romana	Martin M. Miroslava	Miroslava	Rastislav	Miroslava	7th Evicted
9	Matej	Rastislav; Romana	Romana	Andrea M.	Andrea M.	8th Evicted
10	Matej; Iveta	Vladimír; Nicoletta	Nicoletta	Kristi	Nicoletta	9th Evicted
11	Martin M.	Radovan; Kristi	Vladimír	Nikola	Vladimír	10th Evicted
12	Gabriel	Radovan; Nikola	Radovan	Rastislav	Rastislav	11th Evicted
13	Gabriel	Martin M. Iveta	Martin M.	Romana	Martin M.	12th Evicted
14	Gabriel	Radovan; Iveta	Iveta	Barbora	Iveta	13th Evicted
15	Elimination Week				Nikola	14th Evicted
15	Elimination Week				Barbora	15th Evicted
15	Semi Final				Kristi	16th Evicted
Final Duel					Radovan	2nd Runner-up
Final Duel					Romana	Runner-up
Final Duel					Gabriel	Winner
