= Farma season 10 =

Season of television series

Farma
- Season 10
- Presented by: Eva "Evelyn" Kramerová
- No. of days: 14 weeks
- No. of housemates: 22
- Winner: Dominik
- Runner-up: Milan

Release
- Original network: Markíza
- Original release: August 30 – December 7, 2018

Season chronology
- ← Previous; Season 9 Next → Season 11

Farma 10 (The Farm 10) is the 10th season of the Slovak version of The Farm reality television show based on the Swedish television series of the same name. The show was filmed from August 2018 to November 2018 and premiered on August 30, 2018 on Markíza.

== Format ==
Twelve contestants are chosen from the outside world and they are joined by six celebrities. Celebrities take roles as rich farmers while others are considered as poor farmer. Contestants from rich group cannot become Butlers, but they can be chosen as second dueler. After 5th week, contestants are merged into one group. Each week one contestant is selected the Farmer of the Week. In the first week, contestant who finds Farmer of the Week clue becomes Farmer of the Week. Since week 2, the Farmer is chosen by the contestant evicted in the previous week. For the first time there are group challenges for reward and individual challenges for immunity. Also for the first time, there was an elimination week in final week of the show and final three instead of final two.

=== Nomination process ===
The Farmer of the Week nominates two people (a man and a woman) as the Butlers. The others must decide which Butler is the first to go to the Battle. That person then chooses the second person (from the same sex) for the Battle and also the type of battle. The Battle winner must win three duels. The Battle loser is evicted from the game.

Ages stated are at time of contest.

Contestant	Age	Background	Hometown	Starting team	Status	Finish
Lenka Horníková	20	Maternity leave	Trnava	Poor	Quit on Week 1	22nd
Katarína Brychtová	51	Actress, TV host	Bratislava	Rich	Quit on Week 1	21st
Monika Siposová	37	Maternity leave	Štvrtok na Ostrove	Poor	Evacuated on Week 2	20th
Imrich Zambo	57	Unemployed	Brezno	Poor	Evacuated on Week 3	19th
Daniela Nízlová	32	Singers, duo TWiiNS	Hronský Beňadik	Rich	Quit on Week 4	18th
Veronika Nízlová	32	Singers, duo TWiiNS	Hronský Beňadik	Rich	Quit on Week 4	18th
Robo Mikla	36	Singer	Žiar nad Hronom	Rich	Quit on Week 4	17th
Silvia Šuvadová	45	Actress	Los Angeles	Rich	2nd Evicted on Week 5	16th
Filip Hakl	20	Thai boxing trainer	Bratislava	Bandits	3rd Evicted on Week 6	15th
Dajana Šildová	26	Hostess	Nitra	Bandits	4th Evicted on Week 7	14th
Juraj Solčanský	25	Picker	Nitra	Poor	5th Evicted on Week 8	13th
Lívia Chvostíková	21	Promoter	Považská Bystrica	Bandits	6th Evicted on Week 9	12th
Ibrahim Maiga	55	Actor, singer	Mali	Rich	7th Evicted on Week 10	11th
Michaela Štefániková	33	Butcher	Ražňany	Poor	8th Evicted on Week 11	10th
Tatiana Brunayová	31	Administrative worker	Topoľčany	Poor	9th Evicted on Week 12	9th
Martin Šmahel	35	TV host, model	Stupava	Rich	10th Evicted on Week 13	8th
Michal Gajdošech	28	Model	Prague	Poor	11th Evicted on Week 14	7th
Renáta Greschner	49	Massager	Prievidza	Poor	12th Evicted on Week 14	6th
Daniela Urbanová	23	Manicurist	Šaľa	Bandits	13th Evicted on Week 14	5th
Karin Dvořáková	25	Barmaid	Banská Bystrica	Poor	14th Evicted on Week 14	4th
Peter Harezník	38	Truck driver	Dolný Kubín	Poor	Runner-up on Week 14	2nd
Milan Vysokai	35	Unemployed	Nitra	Poor	Runner-up on Week 14	2nd
Dominik Porubský	20	Timber tractor worker	Trenčianska Teplá	Poor	Winner on Week 14	1st

=== Nominations ===
	Week 1	Week 2	Week 3	Week 4	Week 5	Week 6	Week 7	Week 8	Week 9	Week 10	Week 11	Week 12	Week 13	Week 14				Final
Farmer of the Week (Immunity)	Daniela & Veronika	Renáta	Michal	Dominik	Milan	Juraj	Lívia	Ibrahim	Karin	Michal	Renáta	Peter	Peter	None				
Buttlers	Michaela; Peter	Karin; Dominik	Tatiana; Imrich	Renáta; Michal	Silvia; Martin	Lívia; Filip	Renáta; Martin	Michaela; Juraj	Daniela; Milan	Daniela; Dominik	Michaela; Peter	Renáta; Martin	Karin; Martin	None				
Dominik		Buttler		Farmer of the Week						Buttler; 1st Dueler								Winner (Week 14)
Milan					Farmer of the Week				Buttler									Runner-Up (Week 14)
Peter	Buttler					2nd Dueler					Buttler	Farmer of the Week	Farmer of the Week					Runner-Up (Week 14)
Karin		Buttler; 1st Dueler							Farmer of the Week				Buttler; 2nd Dueler					Evicted (Week 14)
Daniela	Not in The Farm								Buttler; 1st Dueler	Buttler	2nd Dueler					Last in challenge	Evicted (Week 14)	
Renáta		Farmer of the Week		Buttler			Buttler; 1st Dueler				Farmer of the Week	Buttler			Last in challenge	Evicted (Week 14)		
Michal			Farmer of the Week	Buttler; 1st Dueler				2nd Dueler		Farmer of the Week				Last in challenge	Evicted (Week 14)			
Martin					Buttler		Buttler					Buttler; 1st Dueler	Buttler; 1st Dueler	Evicted (Week 13)				
Tatiana			Buttler									2nd Dueler	Evicted (Week 12)					
Michaela	Buttler; 1st Dueler				2nd Dueler			Buttler			Buttler; 1st Dueler	Evicted (Week 11)						
Ibrahim			2nd Dueler					Farmer of the Week		2nd Dueler	Evicted (Week 10)							
Lívia	Not in The Farm					Buttler	Farmer of the Week		2nd Dueler	Evicted (Week 9)								
Juraj						Farmer of the Week		Buttler; 1st Dueler	Evicted (Week 8)									
Dajana	Not in The Farm						2nd Dueler	Evicted (Week 7)										
Filip	Not in The Farm					Buttler; 1st Dueler	Evicted (Week 6)											
Silvia					Buttler; 1st Dueler	Evicted (Week 5)												
Robo				2nd Dueler	Quit (Week 4)													
Daniela & Veronika	Farmer of the Week	2nd Dueler	Evicted (Week 2)		Quit (Week 4)													
Imrich			Buttler; 1st Dueler	Evacuated (Week 3)														
Monika	2nd Dueler		Evacuated (Week 2)															
Katarína		Quit (Week 1)																
Lenka	2nd Dueler	Quit (Week 1)																
Evacuated	None	Monika	Imrich	None														
Quit	Lenka; Katarína	None		Daniela & Veronika; Robo	None													
1st Dueler (By Group)	Michaela	Karin	Imrich	Michal	Silvia	Filip	Renáta	Juraj	Daniela	Dominik	Michaela	Martin	Martin	None				
2nd Dueler (By 1st Dueler)	Lenka; Monika	Daniela & Veronika	Ibrahim	Robo	Michaela	Peter	Dajana	Michal	Lívia	Ibrahim	Daniela	Tatiana	Karin	None				
Evicted	Michaela; Saved	Daniela & Veronika; Lost duel	Daniela & Veronika; Returned	Duel cancelled	Silvia; Lost duel	Filip; Lost duel	Dajana; Lost duel	Juraj; Lost duel	Lívia; Lost duel	Ibrahim; Lost duel	Michaela; Lost duel	Tatiana; Lost duel	Martin; Lost duel	Michal; Lost challenge	Renáta; Lost challenge	Daniela; Lost challenge	Karin; Lost duel	Peter; Runner-up; Lost final duel
Evicted	Michaela; Saved	Daniela & Veronika; Lost duel	Daniela & Veronika; Returned	Duel cancelled	Silvia; Lost duel	Filip; Lost duel	Dajana; Lost duel	Juraj; Lost duel	Lívia; Lost duel	Ibrahim; Lost duel	Michaela; Lost duel	Tatiana; Lost duel	Martin; Lost duel	Michal; Lost challenge	Renáta; Lost challenge	Daniela; Lost challenge	Karin; Lost duel	Milan; Runner-up; Lost final duel
Evicted	Michaela; Saved	Daniela & Veronika; Lost duel	Duel cancelled	Duel cancelled	Silvia; Lost duel	Filip; Lost duel	Dajana; Lost duel	Juraj; Lost duel	Lívia; Lost duel	Ibrahim; Lost duel	Michaela; Lost duel	Tatiana; Lost duel	Martin; Lost duel	Michal; Lost challenge	Renáta; Lost challenge	Daniela; Lost challenge	Karin; Lost duel	Dominik; Winner; Wins final duel

== The game ==
Week	Farmer of the Week	Butlers	1st Dueler	2nd Dueler	Evicted	Finish
1	Daniela & Veronika	Michaela; Peter	Michaela	Lenka	Lenka	Quit
1	Daniela & Veronika	Michaela; Peter	Michaela	Monika	Michaela	Saved
1	Daniela & Veronika	Michaela; Peter	Michaela	Monika	Katarína	Quit
2	Renáta	Karin; Dominik	Karin	Daniela & Veronika	Daniela & Veronika	1st Evicted
3	Michal	Tatiana; Imrich	Imrich	Ibrahim	Monika	Evacuated
3	Michal	Tatiana; Imrich	Imrich	Ibrahim	Daniela & Veronika	Return
3	Michal	Tatiana; Imrich	Imrich	Ibrahim	Imrich	Evacuated
4	Dominik	Renáta; Michal	Michal	Robo	Daniela & Veronika	Quit
4	Dominik	Renáta; Michal	Michal	Robo	Robo	Quit
5	Milan	Silvia; Martin	Silvia	Michaela	Silvia	2nd Evicted
6	Juraj	Lívia; Filip	Filip	Peter	Filip	3rd Evicted
7	Lívia	Renáta; Martin	Renáta	Dajana	Dajana	4th Evicted
8	Ibrahim	Michaela; Juraj	Juraj	Michal	Juraj	5th Evicted
9	Karin	Daniela; Milan	Daniela	Lívia	Lívia	6th Evicted
10	Michal	Daniela; Dominik	Dominik	Ibrahim	Ibrahim	7th Evicted
11	Renáta	Michaela; Peter	Michaela	Daniela	Michaela	8th Evicted
12	Peter	Renáta; Martin	Martin	Tatiana	Tatiana	9th Evicted
13	Peter	Karin; Martin	Martin	Karin	Martin	10th Evicted
14	Elimination Week				Michal	11th Evicted
14	Elimination Week				Renáta	12th Evicted
14	Elimination Week				Daniela	13th Evicted
14	Semi Final				Karin	14th Evicted
Final Duel					Peter	Runner-up
Final Duel					Milan	Runner-up
Final Duel					Dominik	Winner
