= Farma season 12 =

Season of television series

Farma
- Season 12
- Presented by: Eva "Evelyn" Kramerová
- No. of days: 74
- No. of housemates: 20
- Winner: Xénia Gregušová
- Runners-up: Henrich Kuľko; Lukáš Stanislav

Release
- Original network: Markíza
- Original release: August 31 – December 11, 2020

Season chronology
- ← Previous; Season 11 Next → Season 13

Farma 12 - City vs Village is the twelfth season of the Slovak version of The Farm reality television show based on the Swedish television series of the same name. The show began filming in August 2020 and premiered on August 31, 2020 on Markíza.

== Format ==
Twenty contestants are chosen from the outside world. This year's twist is City vs Village. In each team there are ten contestants. Contestants live together on a farm but in two groups. Richer city part have some benefits from city life and poorer village part has harder conditions. In first week contestants from Team City are entered to the Village part of farm and contestants from Team Village are entered to the City part. After two weeks teams swap places.

== Nomination process ==
In the first few weeks, only contestants who live in the Village got to choose the Farmer of the Week and Butlers. Those in the City can choose their Farmer of the Week but they don't need to. From butlers team will choose duelist for their team and second team must vote for another duelist. In the duel they need 3 points to survive, otherwise they're evicted from the farm. After 3rd week, evicted farmer chooses Farmer of the Week.

== Chalúpka ==
After losing the duel, the evicted contestant doesn't go home. Instead, they are taken to a secret place across the lake called Chalúpka where he or she will stay and will be joined by other evicted contestants and they will wait for their chance for return.

== Contestants ==
Ages stated are at time of contest.

Contestant	Age	Background	Residence	Starting team	Status	Chalúpka Status	Finish
Mária Both	41	Waitress	Lucerne, Switzerland	Village	3rd Evicted on Week 3	Lost Duel on Week 6	20th
Nikol Fridrichová	32	Influencer	Bratislava	City	5th Evicted on Week 5	Lost Duel on Week 6	19th
Mário Rigó	26	Waiter	Zlaté Klasy	Village	4th Evicted on Week 4	Returned on Week 6	18th
Mário Rigó	26	Waiter	Zlaté Klasy	Village	6th Evicted on Week 7		18th
Beáta Rusnáková	20	Student	Osláre	Village	7th Evicted on Week 7		17th
Rebeka Hlavatá	25	Receptionist	Galanta	City	8th Evicted on Week 7		16th
Matúš Jaroš	29	Molder	Košice	City	9th Evicted on Week 8		15th
Henrik Szabo	25	Stripper	Bratislava	City	Evacuated on Week 9		14th
Adam Tomek	26	Manager	Bratislava	City	Evacuated on Week 9		13th
Eva Lipovská	41	Waitress	Cupra Marittima, Italy	Village	10th Evicted on Week 10		12th
Monika Šuleková	31	Shop owner	Rimavská Sobota	City	11th Evicted on Week 10		11th
Michal Arbet	28	Electrician	Hrachovište	Village	1st Evicted on Week 1	Returned on Week 6	10th
Michal Arbet	28	Electrician	Hrachovište	Village	12th Evicted on Week 11		10th
Norbert Brezík	50	Taxi driver	Stajićevo, Serbia	Village	13th Evicted on Week 12		9th
Sára Adamčíková	21	Fitness trainer	Rabča	Village	14th Evicted on Week 13		8th
Anna Fiačanová	37	Shop manager	Liptovský Mikuláš	City	15th Evicted on Week 14		7th
Katarína Pohančaníková	30	Clerk	Dolný Harmanec	Village	16th Evicted on Week 15		6th
Erik Zahorjan	26	Construction worker	Prešov	City	17th Evicted on Week 15		5th
Vladislav Nikolayev	44	Financial advisor	Bratislava	City	18th Evicted on Week 15		4th
Lukáš Stanislav	31	Therapist	Chrasť nad Hornádom	Village	2nd Evicted on Week 2	Returned on Week 6	3rd
Lukáš Stanislav	31	Therapist	Chrasť nad Hornádom	Village	2nd Runner-up on Week 15		3rd
Henrich Kuľko	28	Waiter	Spišský Štiavnik	Village	Runner-up on Week 15		2nd
Xénia Gregušová	21	Dance teacher	Žilina	City	Winner on Week 15		1st

=== Nominations ===
	Week 1	Week 2	Week 3	Week 4	Week 5	Week 6	Week 7	Week 8	Week 9	Week 10	Week 11	Week 12	Week 13	Week 14	Week 15			Final
Farmer of the Week (Immunity)	Monika	Adam	Eva	Norbert	Katarína	Norbert	Erik	Lukáš	Vladislav	Anna	Norbert	Xénia	Katarína	Erik	None			
Butlers	Xénia; Matúš	Anna; Henrik	Sára; Erik	Sára; Erik	Nikol; Erik	Monika; Henrik	Rebeka; Henrich	Anna; Vladislav	Monika; Michal	Eva; Lukáš	Sára; Erik	Katarína; Norbert	Sára; Erik	Anna; Lukáš	None			
Xénia	Butler; 1st Dueler									2nd Dueler		Farmer of the Week			3rd in challenge			Winner (Week 15)
Henrich							Butler; 1st Dueler							2nd Dueler	2nd in challenge			Runner-Up (Week 15)
Lukáš		2nd Dueler	Evicted; Week 2	in Chalúpka			Won Duel	Farmer of the Week	2nd Dueler	Butler				Butler	1st in challenge			2nd Runner-up (Week 15)
Vladislav					2nd Dueler			Butler; 1st Dueler	Farmer of the Week						4th in challenge			Evicted; Week 15
Erik			Butler	Butler; 1st Dueler	Butler		Farmer of the Week				Butler; 1st Dueler	2nd Dueler	Butler; 1st Dueler	Farmer of the Week	5th in challenge		Evicted; Week 15	
Katarína	2nd Dueler				Farmer of the Week					2nd Dueler		Butler	Farmer of the Week		6th in challenge	Evicted; Week 15		
Anna		Butler				2nd Dueler		Butler		Farmer of the Week				Butler; 1st Dueler	Evicted; Week 14			
Sára			Butler	Butler							Butler		Butler; 2nd Dueler	Evicted; Week 13				
Norbert				Farmer of the Week		Farmer of the Week					Farmer of the Week	Butler; 1st Dueler	Evicted; Week 12					
Michal	2nd Dueler	Evicted; Week 1	in Chalúpka				Won Duel		Butler; 1st Dueler		2nd Dueler	Evicted; Week 11						
Monika	Farmer of the Week					Butler			Butler	1st Dueler	Evicted; Week 10							
Eva			Farmer of the Week							Butler; 1st dueler	Evicted; Week 10							
Adam		Farmer of the Week		Evacuated (Week 3)						Evacuated (Week 9)								
Henrik		Butler; 1st Dueler				Butler				Evacuated (Week 9)								
Matúš	Butler; 1st Dueler							2nd Dueler	Evicted; Week 8									
Rebeka						1st Dueler	Butler; 1st Dueler	Evicted; Week 7										
Beáta							2nd Dueler	Evicted; Week 7										
Mário				2nd Dueler	Evicted; Week 4	in Chalúpka	Won Duel; 2nd Dueler	Evicted; Week 7										
Nikol			2nd Dueler		Butler; 1st Dueler	Evicted; Week 5	Lost Duel; Week 6											
Mária			1st Dueler	Evicted; Week 3	in Chalúpka		Lost Duel; Week 6											
Evacuated	None		Adam	None					Henrik; Adam	None								
Dueler (by City)	Xénia; Matúš	Henrik	Nikol	Mário	Vladislav	Rebeka	Rebeka; Henrich	Vladislav	Michal	Eva; Monika	Erik	Norbert	Erik	Anna	None			
Dueler (by Village)	Katarína; Michal	Lukáš	Mária	Erik	Nikol	Anna	Beáta; Mário	Matúš	Lukáš	Katarína; Xénia	Michal	Erik	Sára	Henrich	None			
Evicted	Michal; Lost duel	Lukáš; Lost duel	Mária; Lost duel	Mário; Lost duel	Nikol; Lost duel	Mária; Lost duel	Rebeka; Voted out	Matúš; Lost duel	Michal; Saved	Eva; Lost duel	Michal; Lost duel	Norbert; Lost duel	Sára; Lost duel	Anna; Lost duel	Katarína; Lost challenge	Erik; Voted out	Vladislav; Lost duel	Lukáš; 2nd Runner-up; Lost final duel
Evicted	Michal; Lost duel	Lukáš; Lost duel	Mária; Lost duel	Adam; Returned	Nikol; Lost duel	Nikol; Lost duel	Mário; Lost duel	Matúš; Lost duel	Michal; Saved	Monika; Lost duel	Michal; Lost duel	Norbert; Lost duel	Sára; Lost duel	Anna; Lost duel	Katarína; Lost challenge	Erik; Voted out	Vladislav; Lost duel	Henrich; Runner-up; Lost final duel
Evicted	Michal; Lost duel	Lukáš; Lost duel	Mária; Lost duel	Adam; Returned	Nikol; Lost duel	Nikol; Lost duel	Beáta; Lost duel	Matúš; Lost duel	Michal; Saved	Monika; Lost duel	Michal; Lost duel	Norbert; Lost duel	Sára; Lost duel	Anna; Lost duel	Katarína; Lost challenge	Erik; Voted out	Vladislav; Lost duel	Xénia; Winner; Wins final duel

== The game ==
Week	Farmer of the Week	Butlers	1st Dueler	2nd Dueler	Evicted	Finish
1	Monika	Xénia; Matúš	Xénia; Matúš	Katarína; Michal	Michal	1st Evicted
2	Adam	Anna; Henrik	Henrik	Lukáš	Lukáš	2nd Evicted
3	Eva	Sára; Erik	Nikol	Mária	Adam	Evacuated
3	Eva	Sára; Erik	Nikol	Mária	Mária	3rd Evicted
4	Norbert	Sára; Erik	Erik	Mário	Mário	4th Evicted
4	Norbert	Sára; Erik	Erik	Mário	Adam	Return
5	Katarína	Nikol; Erik	Nikol	Vladislav	Nikol	5th Evicted
6	Norbert	Monika; Henrik	Rebeka	Anna	Mária	Lost Duel
6	Norbert	Monika; Henrik	Rebeka	Anna	Nikol	Lost Duel
6	Norbert	Monika; Henrik	Rebeka	Anna	Michal	Returned
6	Norbert	Monika; Henrik	Rebeka	Anna	Lukáš	Returned
6	Norbert	Monika; Henrik	Rebeka	Anna	Mário	Returned
7	Erik	Rebeka; Henrich	Rebeka; Henrich	Mário; Beáta	Mário	6th Evicted
7	Erik	Rebeka; Henrich	Rebeka; Henrich	Mário; Beáta	Beáta	7th Evicted
7	Erik	Rebeka; Henrich	Rebeka; Henrich	Mário; Beáta	Rebeka	8th Evicted
8	Lukáš	Anna; Vladislav	Vladislav	Matúš	Matúš	9th Evicted
9	Vladislav	Monika; Michal	Michal	Lukáš	Henrik	Evacuated
9	Vladislav	Monika; Michal	Michal	Lukáš	Adam	Evacuated
9	Vladislav	Monika; Michal	Michal	Lukáš	Michal	Saved
10	Anna	Eva; Lukáš	Eva; Monika	Katarína; Xénia	Eva	10th Evicted
10	Anna	Eva; Lukáš	Eva; Monika	Katarína; Xénia	Monika	11th Evicted
11	Norbert	Sára; Erik	Erik	Michal	Michal	12th Evicted
12	Xénia	Katarína; Norbert	Norbert	Erik	Norbert	13th Evicted
13	Katarína	Sára; Erik	Erik	Sára	Sára	14th Evicted
14	Erik	Anna; Lukáš	Anna	Henrich	Anna	15th Evicted
15	Elimination Week				Katarína	16th Evicted
15	Elimination Week				Erik	17th Evicted
15	Semi Final				Vladislav	18th Evicted
Final Duel					Lukáš	2nd Runner-up
Final Duel					Henrich	Runner-up
Final Duel					Xénia	Winner
