= Farma season 13 =

Farma
- Season 13
- Presented by: Eva Evelyn Kramerová; Martin Bagar
- No. of days: 75
- No. of housemates: 21
- Winner: Miroslav Debnár
- Runners-up: Eva Vajsová; Dávid Horák
- Location: Hubina, Slovakia

Release
- Original network: Markíza; Voyo
- Original release: August 30 – December 12, 2021

Season chronology
- ← Previous; Season 12 Next → Season 14

Farma 13 (The Farm 13) is the thirteenth season of the Slovak reality television series Farma. This season goes back to the regular format of the show where 21 ordinary Slovaks live on a farm like it was a century ago and complete tasks for the farm mentor to try and win €75,000. The season premiered on the streaming service Voyo on 27 August 2021 and premiered on Markíza 3 days later on 30 August 2021.

== Format ==
Fifteen contestants are chosen from the outside world. Each week one contestant is selected the Farmer of the Week. In the first week, the contestants choose the Farmer. Since week 2, the Farmer is chosen by the contestant evicted in the previous week.

=== Nomination process ===
The Farmer of the Week nominates two people (a man and a woman) as the Butlers. The others must decide which Butler is the first to go to the Battle. That person then chooses the second person (from the same sex) for the Battle and also the type of battle (a quiz, extrusion, endurance, sleight). The Battle winner must win two duels. The Battle loser is evicted from the game.

Ages stated are at time of contest.

Contestant	Age	Background	Hometown	Starting team	Status	Finish
Beáta Landerl	56	Receptionist	Vienna, Austria	Blue	1st Evicted; Day 2	21st
Nikoleta Mališková	29	Real estate agent	Bratislava	Red	2nd Evicted; Week 1	20th
Daniel Gugh	22	Taxi driver	Golianovo	White	3rd Evicted; Week 2	19th
Patrícia Šimanová	19	Student	Trnava	White	Evacuated; Week 4	18th
Jozef Ladziansky	40	Firefighter	Harmanec	Blue	5th Evicted; Week 4	17th
Miroslava Kuryś Koperová	35	Accountant	Newport, Wales	White	6th Evicted; Week 5	16th
Zdeněk Valent	32	Unemployed	Bratislava	Red	7th Evicted; Week 6	15th
Monika Fabová	26	Warehouse worker	Detva	Red	8th Evicted; Week 7	14th
Miroslav Pajtáš	35	Personal trainer	Birmingham, England	Blue	9th Evicted; Week 8	13th
Petra Pajáková	29	Rentier	Bratislava	Shepherds	10th Evicted; Week 9	12th
Matúš Mrážik	26	Strategic buyer	Prague, Czech Republic	Red	11th Evicted; Week 9	11th
Michal Bučko	37	Swimming pool manager	Košice	Shepherds	12th Evicted; Week 11	10th
Nikola Báleková	30	Unemployed	Martin	White	13th Evicted; Week 12	9th
Terézia Vargová	29	Banker	Veľký Krtíš	Helpers	14th Evicted; Week 13	8th
Peter Matejka	37	Forklift driver	Nemšová	Helpers	Ejected; Week 14	7th
Michala Šormanová	31	Fitness trainer	Bojnice	Shepherds	15th Evicted; Week 14	6th
Stanka Klčová	23	Customer service	Čachtice	Blue	16th Evicted; Week 15	5th
Natália Lopašovská	22	Barber	Sereď	Shepherds	17th Evicted; Week 15	4th
Dávid Horák	29	Construction worker	Komárno	White	2nd Runner-up; Week 15	3rd
Eva Vajsová	35	Carpenter	Senec	Blue	Runner-up; Week 15	2nd
Miroslav Debnár	26	Gardener	Banská Bystrica	Red	Winner; Week 15	1st

=== Nominations ===
	Day 2	Week 1	Week 2	Week 3	Week 4	Week 5	Week 6	Week 7	Week 8	Week 9	Week 10	Week 11	Week 12	Week 13	Week 14	Week 15		Final
Farmer of the Week (Immunity)	None	Jozef	Zdeněk	Miroslava	Miroslava	Monika	Miroslav D.	Nikola	Petra	Stanka	Dávid	Miroslav D.	Terézia	Eva	Miroslav D.	None		
Butlers	None	Monika; Dávid	Stanka; Daniel	Nikola; Matúš	Patrícia; Zdeněk; Stanka	Eva; Miroslav P.	Natália; Miroslav P.	Natália; Dávid	Stanka; Miroslav P.	Michala; Miroslav D.	Nikola; Michal	Terézia; Peter	Natália; Dávid	Michala; Miroslav D.	Stanka; Peter	None		
Miroslav D.							Farmer of the Week			Butler	1st Dueler	Farmer of the Week		Butler	Farmer of the Week; 1st Dueler			Winner (Week 15)
Eva						Butler; 1st Dueler								Farmer of the Week				Runner-Up (Week 15)
Dávid		Butler						Butler; 1st Dueler			Farmer of the Week		Butler; 1st Dueler					2nd Runner-up (Week 15)
Natália	Not in The Farm						Butler	Butler	2nd Dueler				Butler					Evicted; Week 15
Stanka			Butler		Butler				Butler	Farmer of the Week					Butler		Evicted; Week 15	
Michala	Not in The Farm									Butler; 1st Dueler				Butler; 1st Dueler	2nd Dueler	Evicted; Week 14		
Peter	Not in The Farm										2nd Dueler	Butler; 1st Dueler			Butler	Ejected (Week 14)		
Terézia	Not in The Farm										2nd Dueler	Butler	Farmer of the Week	2nd Dueler	Evicted; Week 13			
Nikola				Butler; 1st Dueler				Farmer of the Week			Butler; 1st Dueller		2nd Dueler	Evicted; Week 12				
Michal	Not in The Farm										Butler	2nd Dueler	Evicted; Week 11					
Matúš				Butler						2nd Dueler	Evicted; Week 9							
Petra	Not in The Farm								Farmer of the Week		Evicted; Week 9							
Miroslav P.						Butler	Butler; 1st Dueler		Butler; 1st Dueler	Evicted; Week 8								
Monika		Butler; 1st Dueler		2nd Dueler	Evicted; Week 3	Farmer of the Week		2nd Dueler	Evicted; Week 7									
Zdeněk			Farmer of the Week		Butler; 1st Dueler		2nd Dueler	Evicted; Week 6										
Miroslava	Dueler			Farmer of the Week	Farmer of the Week	2nd Dueler	Evicted; Week 5											
Jozef		Farmer of the Week	2nd Dueler		2nd Dueler	Evicted; Week 4												
Patrícia					Butler	Evacuated (Week 4)												
Daniel			Butler; 1st Dueler	Evicted; Week 2														
Nikoleta	Dueler	2nd Dueler	Evicted; Week 1															
Beáta	Dueler	Evicted; Day 2																
Evacuated	None				Patrícia	None												
Ejected	None														Peter	None		
Dueler Butler	Miroslava; Beáta; Nikoleta	Monika	Daniel	Nikola	Zdeněk	Eva	Miroslav P.	Dávid	Miroslav P.	Michala	Nikola; Miroslav D.	Peter	Dávid	Michala	Miroslav D.	None		
Dueler By 1st Dueler	Miroslava; Beáta; Nikoleta	Nikoleta	Jozef	Monika	Jozef	Miroslava	Zdeněk	Monika	Natália	Matúš	Peter; Terézia	Miroslav	Nikola	Terézia	Michala	None		
Evicted	Beáta; Lost duel	Nikoleta; Lost duel	Daniel; Lost duel	Monika; Lost duel	Monika; Returned	Miroslava; Lost duel	Zdeněk; Lost duel	Monika; Lost duel	Miroslav P. Lost duel	Petra; Evicted	Peter; Terézia; Saved	Michal; Lost duel	Nikola; Lost duel	Terézia; Lost duel	Michala; Lost duel	Stanka; Lost challenge	Natália; Lost duel	Dávid; 2nd Runner-up; Lost final duel
Evicted	Beáta; Lost duel	Nikoleta; Lost duel	Daniel; Lost duel	Monika; Lost duel	Jozef; Lost duel	Miroslava; Lost duel	Zdeněk; Lost duel	Monika; Lost duel	Miroslav P. Lost duel	Matúš; Lost duel	Peter; Terézia; Saved	Michal; Lost duel	Nikola; Lost duel	Terézia; Lost duel	Michala; Lost duel	Stanka; Lost challenge	Natália; Lost duel	Eva; Runner-up; Lost final duel
Evicted	Beáta; Lost duel	Nikoleta; Lost duel	Daniel; Lost duel	Monika; Lost duel	Jozef; Lost duel	Miroslava; Lost duel	Zdeněk; Lost duel	Monika; Lost duel	Miroslav P. Lost duel	Matúš; Lost duel	Peter; Terézia; Saved	Michal; Lost duel	Nikola; Lost duel	Terézia; Lost duel	Michala; Lost duel	Stanka; Lost challenge	Natália; Lost duel	Miroslav D. Winner; Wins final duel

== The game ==
Week	Farmer of the Week	Butlers	1st Dueler	2nd Dueler	Evicted	Finish
1	Jozef	Monika; Dávid	Monika	Nikoleta	Beáta	1st Evicted; Day 2 (Note: As only 14 contestants could make it to the farm, they competed in a series of challenges. As Beáta finished last, she was eliminated before arriving to the farm.)
1	Jozef	Monika; Dávid	Monika	Nikoleta	Nikoleta	2nd Evicted; Week 1
2	Zdeněk	Stanka; Daniel	Daniel	Jozef	Daniel	3rd Evicted; Week 2
3	Miroslava	Nikola; Matúš	Nikola	Monika	Monika	4th Evicted; Week 3
4	Miroslava	Patrícia; Zdeněk; Stanka	Zdeněk	Jozef	Patrícia	Evacuated; Week 4
4	Miroslava	Patrícia; Zdeněk; Stanka	Zdeněk	Jozef	Monika	Return
4	Miroslava	Patrícia; Zdeněk; Stanka	Zdeněk	Jozef	Jozef	5th Evicted; Week 4
5	Monika	Eva; Miroslav P.	Eva	Miroslava	Miroslava	6th Evicted; Week 5
6	Miroslav D.	Natália; Miroslav P.	Miroslav P.	Zdeněk	Zdeněk	7th Evicted; Week 6
7	Nikola	Natália; Dávid	Dávid	Monika	Monika	8th Evicted; Week 7
8	Petra	Stanka; Miroslav P.	Miroslav P.	Natália	Miroslav P.	9th Evicted; Week 8
9	Stanka	Michala; Miroslav D.	Michala	Matúš	Petra	10th Evicted; Week 9
9	Stanka	Michala; Miroslav D.	Michala	Matúš	Matúš	11th Evicted; Week 9
10	Dávid	Nikola; Michal	Nikola; Miroslav D.	Terézia; Peter	Terézia; Peter	Saved
11	Miroslav D.	Terézia; Peter	Peter	Michal	Michal	12th Evicted; Week 11
12	Terézia	Natália; Dávid	Dávid	Nikola	Nikola	13th Evicted; Week 12
13	Eva	Michala; Miroslav D.	Michala	Terézia	Terézia	14th Evicted; Week 13
14	Miroslav D. (Note: After 3 chickens died on the farm, farm mentor Martin ejected Peter from the game and as punishment, sent Miroslav D. to the duel arena.)	Stanka; Peter	Miroslav D.	Michala	Peter	Ejected; Week 14
14	Miroslav D.	Stanka; Peter	Miroslav D.	Michala	Michala	15th Evicted; Week 14
15	Elimination Week				Stanka	16th Evicted; Week 15
15	Semi Final				Natália	17th Evicted; Week 15
15	Final Duel				Dávid	2nd Runner-up; Week 15
15	Final Duel				Eva	Runner-up; Week 15
15	Final Duel				Miroslav D.	Winner; Week 15
