= Hrašovík =

Village and municipality in Slovakia

Hrašovík Rás
- Municipality
- Flag

- Location of Hrašovík in the Košice Region Location of Hrašovík in Slovakia
- Coordinates: 48.75°N 21.32°E
- Country: Slovakia
- Region: Košice Region
- District: Košice-okolie District
- First mentioned: 1270

Area
  - Total: 2.04 km^{2} (0.79 sq mi)
- Elevation: 213 m (699 ft)

Population (2025)
  - Total: 436
- Time zone: UTC+1 (CET)
  - Summer (DST): UTC+2 (CEST)
- Postal code: 444 2
- Area code: +421 55
- Vehicle registration plate (until 2022): KS
- Website: hrasovik.sk

Hrašovík (Hungarian: Rás) is a village and municipality in Košice-okolie District in the Košice Region of eastern Slovakia.

== History ==
Historically, the village was first mentioned in 1270.

== Geography ==
The municipality lies at an altitude of 213 metres (699 ft) and covers an area of 2.04 km^{2} (0.79 sq mi) (2025).

== Population ==
Population statistic (10 years)
Year	1995	2005	2015	2025
Count	266	295	345	436
Difference		+10.90%	+16.94%	+26.37%

Population statistic
Year	2024	2025
Count	429	436
Difference		+1.63%

It has a population of 436 people (31 December 2025).

=== Ethnicity ===
Census 2021 (1+ %)
Ethnicity	Number	Fraction
Slovak	359	93.73%
Not found out	15	3.91%
Czech	5	1.3%
Rusyn	4	1.04%
Total	383	

In year 2021 was 383 people by ethnicity 359 as Slovak, 15 as Not found out, 5 as Czech, 4 as Rusyn, 3 as Hungarian, 3 as Other, 2 as German, 2 as Moravian, 1 as Ukrainian and 1 as Romanian.

Note on population: The difference values of population numbers in the table "Population statistic" and in the sections "Ethnicity" & "Religion" is caused by the use of various statistical methods.

=== Religion ===
Census 2021 (1+ %)
Religion	Number	Fraction
Roman Catholic Church	147	38.38%
Evangelical Church	91	23.76%
None	89	23.24%
Calvinist Church	18	4.7%
Not found out	16	4.18%
Greek Catholic Church	16	4.18%
Total	383	

In year 2021 was 383 people by religion 147 from Roman Catholic Church, 91 from Evangelical Church, 89 from None, 18 from Calvinist Church, 16 from Not found out, 16 from Greek Catholic Church, 3 from Eastern Orthodox Church, 1 from Christian Congregations in Slovakia, 1 from United Methodist Church and 1 from Ad hoc movements.

== Genealogical resources ==
The records for genealogical research are available at the state archive "Statny Archiv in Kosice, Slovakia"

- Roman Catholic church records (births/marriages/deaths): 1834-1896 (parish B)
- Greek Catholic church records (births/marriages/deaths): 1773-1905 (parish B)
- Lutheran church records (births/marriages/deaths): 1749-1894 (parish B)
- Reformated church records (births/marriages/deaths): 1753-1896 (parish B)

== Notable people ==
- Vincent Kavečanský, physicist

== See also ==
- List of municipalities and towns in Slovakia
