= Kalnište =

- Municipality
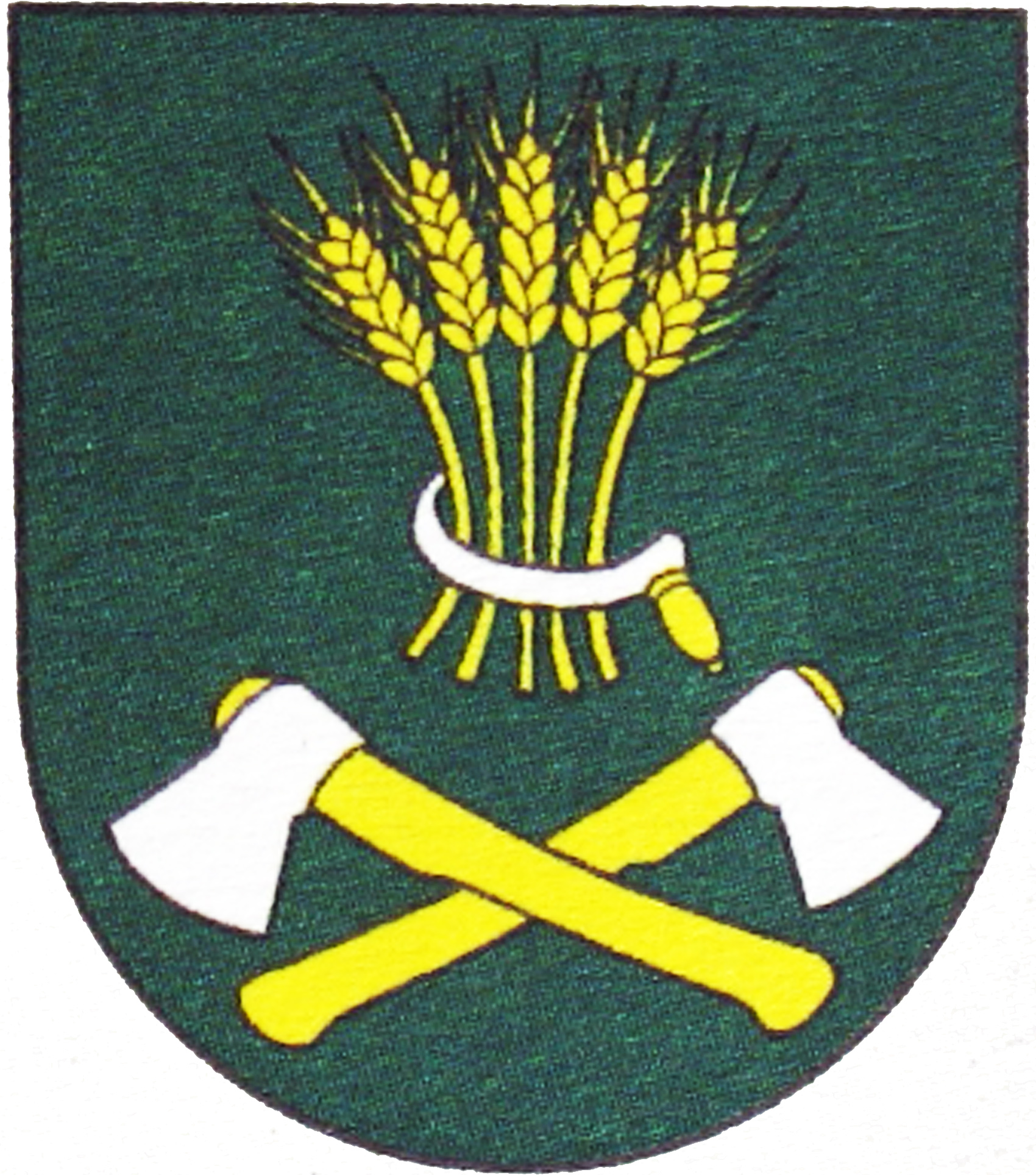
- Flag Coat of arms

- Location of Kalnište in the Prešov Region Location of Kalnište in Slovakia
- Coordinates: 49.13°N 21.48°E
- Country: Slovakia
- Region: Prešov Region
- District: Svidník District
- First mentioned: 1363

Area
  - Total: 8.66 km^{2} (3.34 sq mi)
- Elevation: 184 m (604 ft)

Population (2025)
  - Total: 498
- Time zone: UTC+1 (CET)
  - Summer (DST): UTC+2 (CEST)
- Postal code: 870 1
- Area code: +421 54
- Vehicle registration plate (until 2022): SK
- Website: www.kalniste.sk

Kalnište (Hungarian: Kálnás) is a village and municipality in Svidník District in the Prešov Region of north-eastern Slovakia.

== History ==
In historical records the village was first mentioned in 1363.

== Geography ==
The municipality lies at an altitude of 184 metres (604 ft) and covers an area of 8.66 km^{2} (3.34 sq mi) (2025).

== Population ==
Population statistic (10 years)
Year	1995	2005	2015	2025
Count	520	543	547	498
Difference		+4.42%	+0.73%	−8.95%

Population statistic
Year	2024	2025
Count	503	498
Difference		−0.99%

It has a population of 498 people (31 December 2025).

=== Ethnicity ===
Census 2021 (1+ %)
Ethnicity	Number	Fraction
Slovak	512	99.8%
Czech	8	1.55%
Not found out	6	1.16%
Total	513	

In year 2021 was 513 people by ethnicity 512 as Slovak, 8 as Czech, 6 as Not found out, 4 as Other, 2 as Romani, 2 as German, 1 as Ukrainian, 1 as Rusyn and 1 as Hungarian.

Note on population: The difference values of population numbers in the table "Population statistic" and in the sections "Ethnicity" & "Religion" is caused by the use of various statistical methods.

=== Religion ===
Census 2021 (1+ %)
Religion	Number	Fraction
Roman Catholic Church	372	72.51%
Evangelical Church	112	21.83%
None	10	1.95%
Greek Catholic Church	9	1.75%
Jehovah's Witnesses	8	1.56%
Total	513	

In year 2021 was 513 people by religion 372 from Roman Catholic Church, 112 from Evangelical Church, 10 from None, 9 from Greek Catholic Church, 8 from Jehovah's Witnesses, 1 from Eastern Orthodox Church and 1 from Ad hoc movements.

== Genealogical resources ==
The records for genealogical research are available at the state archive "Statny Archiv in Presov, Slovakia"

- Roman Catholic church records (births/marriages/deaths): 1776-1897 (parish B)
- Greek Catholic church records (births/marriages/deaths): 1839-1935 (parish B)
- Lutheran church records (births/marriages/deaths): 1742-1897 (parish B)

== See also ==
- List of municipalities and towns in Slovakia
