= Ražňany =

- Municipality
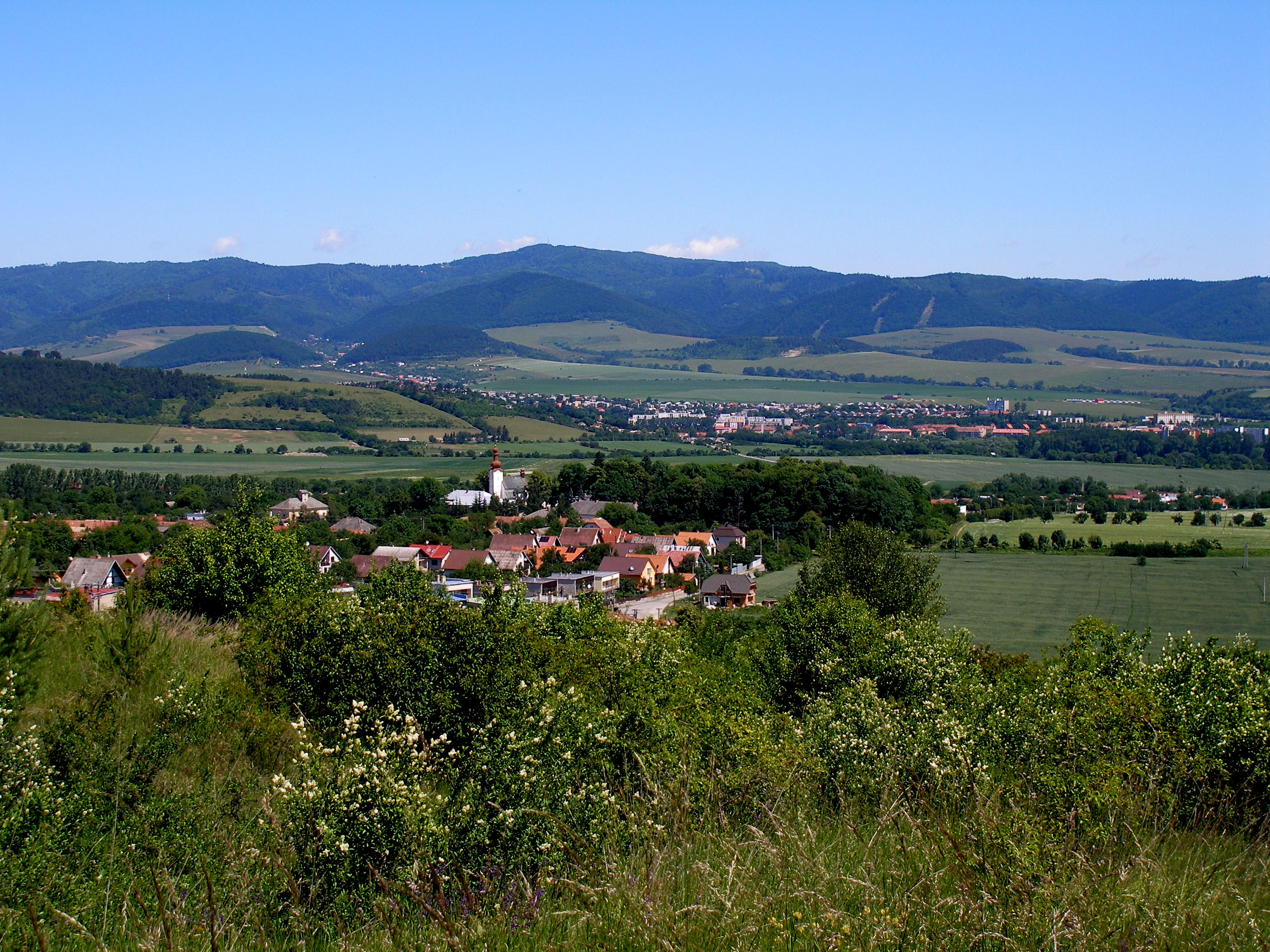

- Flag

- Location of Ražňany in the Prešov Region Location of Ražňany in Slovakia
- Coordinates: 49.08°N 21.08°E
- Country: Slovakia
- Region: Prešov Region
- District: Sabinov District
- First mentioned: 1248

Area
  - Total: 11.46 km^{2} (4.42 sq mi)
- Elevation: 350 m (1,150 ft)

Population (2025)
  - Total: 1,671
- Time zone: UTC+1 (CET)
  - Summer (DST): UTC+2 (CEST)
- Postal code: 826 1
- Area code: +421 51
- Vehicle registration plate (until 2022): SB
- Website: www.raznany.sk

Ražňany is a village and municipality in Sabinov District in the Prešov Region of north-eastern Slovakia, approximately 2 km southwest from the district town of Sabinov and 30 km from the border of Poland. The population of Ražňany is 1,546.

== History ==
In historical records, the village was first mentioned in 1248 as part of the manor of Šariš Castle, and was formed through the combination of the settlements of Nyar and Ardo around 1427. Other names by year include: Nyarsardo 1466, Narssany 1773, Ňaršany 1920. The present name of Ražňany was established in 1948.

== Geography ==
The municipality lies at an altitude of 350 metres (1,150 ft) and covers an area of 11.46 km^{2} (4.42 sq mi) (2025).

== Population ==
Population statistic (10 years)
Year	1995	2005	2015	2025
Count	1362	1449	1511	1671
Difference		+6.38%	+4.27%	+10.58%

Population statistic
Year	2024	2025
Count	1657	1671
Difference		+0.84%

It has a population of 1671 people (31 December 2025).

=== Ethnicity ===
Census 2021 (1+ %)
Ethnicity	Number	Fraction
Slovak	1515	93.23%
Romani	72	4.43%
Not found out	67	4.12%
Total	1625	

In year 2021 was 1625 people by ethnicity 1515 as Slovak, 72 as Romani, 67 as Not found out, 7 as Rusyn, 5 as Czech, 4 as Other, 3 as Turkish, 3 as Polish, 1 as Irish, 1 as Ukrainian, 1 as Silesian, 1 as Greek and 1 as English.

Note on population: The difference values of population numbers in the table "Population statistic" and in the sections "Ethnicity" & "Religion" is caused by the use of various statistical methods.

=== Religion ===
Census 2021 (1+ %)
Religion	Number	Fraction
Roman Catholic Church	1308	80.49%
None	104	6.4%
Not found out	80	4.92%
Greek Catholic Church	43	2.65%
Apostolic Church	41	2.52%
Evangelical Church	22	1.35%
Total	1625	

In year 2021 was 1625 people by religion 1308 from Roman Catholic Church, 104 from None, 80 from Not found out, 43 from Greek Catholic Church, 41 from Apostolic Church, 22 from Evangelical Church, 9 from Christian Congregations in Slovakia, 7 from Ad hoc movements, 5 from Eastern Orthodox Church, 3 from Islam, 1 from Other, 1 from United Methodist Church and 1 from Buddhism.

== Attractions ==
Since 1863, the village has grown the well-known "Narshany" cherries in extensive orchards. A 17th-century manor house and its adjoining park were purchased by the municipality in 1996 from the last private owner, Gedeón Pechy, and now form a communal park.

The village is also home to an airfield, which has been part of local life since 1952. It was historically used to train members of the Sväzarm civil-defence association and, at times, foreign military pilots; today it is used mainly by ultralight aircraft, hang gliders, and paragliders. Each year at the end of summer, the airfield hosts an aviation day featuring glider displays, the "White Albatrosses" aerobatic team, and military helicopters, an event that has become a fixture of village life.

== Notable people ==
Štefan Onderčo (19.8.1884 - 31.3.1937)

- rector, canoeist and politician
