= Andrejová =

- Municipality
- Flag Coat of arms

- Location of Andrejová in the Prešov Region Location of Andrejová in Slovakia
- Coordinates: 49.28°N 21.27°E
- Country: Slovakia
- Region: Prešov Region
- District: Bardejov District
- First mentioned: 1355

Area
  - Total: 11.67 km^{2} (4.51 sq mi)
- Elevation: 319 m (1,047 ft)

Population (2025)
  - Total: 354
- Time zone: UTC+1 (CET)
  - Summer (DST): UTC+2 (CEST)
- Postal code: 850 1
- Area code: +421 54
- Vehicle registration plate (until 2022): BJ
- Website: www.andrejova.eu

Andrejová (Rusyn: Андріёва, romanized: Andrijova, Ukrainian: Андрійова, romanized: Andriiova, Hungarian: Endrevágása) is a village and municipality in Bardejov District in the Prešov Region of Slovakia. The predominant religion is the Greek Catholic Church with 4.9% Eastern Orthodox. The Catholic Church of Virgin Mary the Protectrice of 1893 can be found in the village. The village lies at an altitude of 325 metres and covers an area of 11.679 km^{2}. It has a population of about 362 inhabitants. The village is about 51% Slovak, 20% Rusyn, 16% Romani and 11% Ukrainian with minorities. The village used to have a public library. There is a football pitch and volleyball playground.

== History ==
Before the establishment of independent Czechoslovakia in 1918, Andrejová was part of Sáros County within the Kingdom of Hungary. From 1939 to 1945, it was part of the Slovak Republic. On 19 January 1945, the 1st Czechoslovak Army Corps and the Red Army dislogded the Wehrmacht from Andrejová and it was once again part of Czechoslovakia.

== Geography ==
The municipality lies at an altitude of 319 metres (1,047 ft) and covers an area of 11.67 km^{2} (4.51 sq mi) (2025).

== Population ==
Population statistic (10 years)
Year	1995	2005	2015	2025
Count	285	316	361	354
Difference		+10.87%	+14.24%	−1.93%

Population statistic
Year	2024	2025
Count	351	354
Difference		+0.85%

It has a population of 354 people (31 December 2025).

=== Ethnicity ===
Census 2021 (1+ %)
Ethnicity	Number	Fraction
Slovak	310	88.57%
Rusyn	86	24.57%
Romani	39	11.14%
Not found out	16	4.57%
Ukrainian	6	1.71%
Total	350	

In year 2021 was 350 people by ethnicity 310 as Slovak, 86 as Rusyn, 39 as Romani, 16 as Not found out, 6 as Ukrainian, 3 as Hungarian, 1 as Czech, 1 as Romanian, 1 as Austrian, 1 as Polish, 1 as Other and 1 as Greek.

Note on population: The difference values of population numbers in the table "Population statistic" and in the sections "Ethnicity" & "Religion" is caused by the use of various statistical methods.

=== Religion ===
Census 2021 (1+ %)
Religion	Number	Fraction
Greek Catholic Church	237	67.71%
Roman Catholic Church	58	16.57%
Eastern Orthodox Church	22	6.29%
None	20	5.71%
Not found out	7	2%
Evangelical Church	4	1.14%
Total	350	

In year 2021 was 350 people by religion 237 from Greek Catholic Church, 58 from Roman Catholic Church, 22 from Eastern Orthodox Church, 20 from None, 7 from Not found out, 4 from Evangelical Church, 1 from Paganism and natural spirituality and 1 from Islam.

== See also ==
- List of municipalities and towns in Slovakia
