= List of Slovaks =

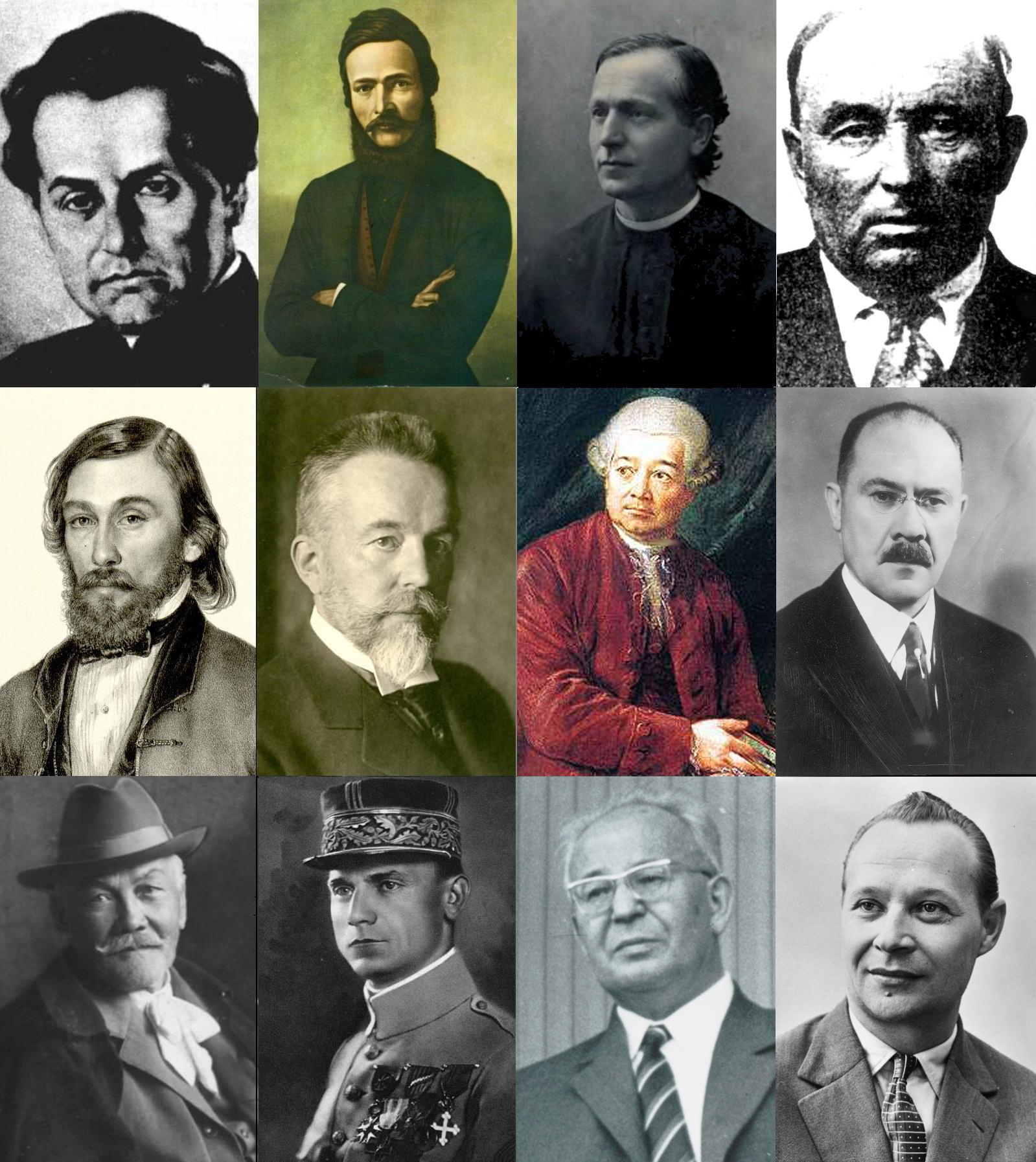
Anton Bernolák, Ľudovít Štúr, Andrej Hlinka, Štefan Banič, Jozef Miloslav Hurban, Aurel Stodola, Adam František Kollár, Milan Hodža, Pavol Országh Hviezdoslav, Milan Rastislav Štefánik, Gustáv Husák, Alexander Dubček

The Slovak people are an ethnic group predominantly residing in the modern-day nation of Slovakia and its surrounding areas. Slovaks have played an active role in European history, including politically, militarily, scientifically, culturally, and religiously. Ethnic Slovaks have inhabited Central Europe since the Middle Ages. Slovaks were minority citizens of Hungary, and subsequently Austria-Hungary, from the 7th Century until the formation of Czechoslovakia in 1918 by the Treaty of Versailles. After Slovak calls for greater autonomy dissolved the Czechoslovak parliament, the Slovak Republic was formed in 1993. The major language among Slovaks is Slovak.

The page lists notable people who are citizens of Slovakia, Czechoslovakia, or are of Slovak identity, ancestry or ethnicity.

== Politics ==
=== Politicians (contemporary) ===
Presidents:

- Michal Kováč (1930–2016) – first president of Slovakia
- Rudolf Schuster (1934) – second president (Schuster is of German and Hungarian ancestry)
- Ivan Gašparovič (1941) – third president (previously Chairman of the National Council of the Slovak Republic)
- Andrej Kiska (1963) – fourth president (co-founder of a non-profit charitable organization called Dobrý anjel)
- Zuzana Čaputová (1973) – fifth president and first female president
- Peter Pellegrini (1975) – sixth president and eighth prime minister

Prime ministers of the Slovak Republic:

- Vladimír Mečiar (1942) – first and third prime minister
- Jozef Moravčík (1945) – second prime minister
- Mikuláš Dzurinda (1955) – fourth prime minister
- Robert Fico (1964) – fifth, seventh and twelfth prime minister
- Iveta Radičová (1956) – sixth and first female prime minister
- Peter Pellegrini (1975) – eighth prime minister
- Igor Matovič (1973) – ninth prime minister
- Eduard Heger (1976) – tenth prime minister
- Ľudovít Ódor (1976) – eleventh and first ethnic Hungarian prime minister

Speakers of National Council of the Slovak Republic:

- Pavol Hrušovský (1952) – Third and Sixth speaker of Parliament
- Richard Sulík (1968) – Fifth speaker of Parliament

Other:

- Irena Bihariová – Slovak Romani lawyer and politician, leader of Progressive Slovakia from June 2020 to May 2022
- Augustín Čisár – Diplomat and the Ambassador Extraordinary and Plenipotentiary of the Slovak Republic to the Russian Federation.
- Miroslav Jenča – Former United Nations ambassador of Slovakia to Mexico
- Miroslav Lajčák (1963) – Former minister of foreign affairs of Slovakia and president of the United Nations General Assembly for the 72nd session
- Jesse Ventura (1951) – 38th governor of the U.S. state of Minnesota from 1999 to 2003, as well as an actor, author, and former professional wrestler. His parents were from Slovakia, and his legal name is James George Janos.

=== Politicians (19th and 20th century) ===
- Alexander Dubček (1921–1992) – First Secretary of the Communist Party of Czechoslovakia and architect of the Prague Spring; after the Velvet Revolution, Chairman of Federal Assembly of Czechoslovakia
- Tomáš Garrigue Masaryk (1850–1937) – first president of Czechoslovakia; son of a Slovak father and a Moravian mother
- Milan Rastislav Štefánik (1880–1919) – astronomer, scientist, politician, and general; one of the founders of Czechoslovakia
- Gustáv Husák (1913–1991) – First Secretary of the Communist Party of Czechoslovakia and President of Czechoslovakia in the 1970s and 1980s
- Štefan Marko Daxner (1822–1892) – Slovak lower nobleman of Swiss descent, politician, lawyer, and poet who of outlined a program unifying the requests for national (Slovak), cultural, political and social liberties
- Andrej Hlinka (1864–1938) – priest and founders of the Slovak People's Party
- Milan Hodža (1878–1944) – Prime Minister of Czechoslovakia, politician and journalist
- Fedor Hodža (1912–1968) – politician and lawyer; the son of Milan Hodža.
- Vojtech Tuka (1880–1946) – Slovak People's Party politician, teacher
- Alexander Mach (1902–1980) – Slovak People's Party politician, journalist
- Martin Rázus (1888–1937) – politician, priest
- Vavro Šrobár (1867-1950) – Slovak doctor and politician who was a major figure in Slovak politics in the interwar period.
- Jozef Miloslav Hurban (1817–1886) – priest, politician and Speaker of Slovak National Council
- Michal Miloslav Hodža (1811–1870) – one of the leaders of a Slovak national movement and member of Slovak National Council, Lutheran priest, poet, linguist
- Vladimír Clementis (1902–1952) – Communist politician
- Ľudovít Štúr (1815–1856) – the leader of Slovak national movement, the creator of standard Slovak, politician, poet, journalist, publisher, teacher, philosopher and member of the Hungarian Parliament

=== Fighters, warriors, soldiers and revolutionaries ===
- Jozef Gabčík (1912–1942) – soldier who assassinated Reinhard Heydrich, architect of the Holocaust, under Operation Anthropoid.
- Jozef Miloslav Hurban (1817–1886) – freedom fighter and leader of the 1848 Slovak National Uprising against the Hungarians.
- Rudolf Viest (1890–1945?) – anti-Fascist military leader, member of the Czechoslovak government in exile, member of the Slovak National Council and the commander of the 1st Czechoslovak army during the Slovak National Uprising. First and only Slovak to reach the position of general in the interwar Czechoslovak Army.
- Ján Golian (1906–1945?) – Supreme Military Leader of the Slovak National Uprising against the Nazis. Golian was murdered by the Nazis in a concentration camp.
- Michael Strank – U.S. marine during World War II; the leader of the group of U.S. marines who photographed in Raising the Flag on Iwo Jima.
- Augustín Malár (1894–1946) – WWII general who commanded the East Slovak units of the First Slovak Republic, a Nazi protectorate state. Died in a concentration camp.
- Jozef Turanec (1892–1957) – Slovak general and Nazi sympathizer during World War II.
- Matej Kocak (1882–1918) – United States Marine Corps sergeant during World War I, posthumously awarded both the U.S. Army and Navy Medals of Honor for action against the enemy on July 18, 1918. He was born in the town of Gbely, in Western Slovakia, and emigrated to the U.S. in 1906.

=== First ladies ===
- Livia Klausová – first lady of the Czech Republic
- Silvia Gašparovičová – first lady of Slovakia

== Religion ==
=== Notable religious figures ===
- Blessed Pavel Peter Gojdič (1888–1960) – martyr and Righteous Among the Nations
- Zdenka Schelingová (1916–1955)
- Basil Hopko (1904–1976)
- Andrej Hlinka (1864–1938)

=== Religious leaders ===
- Štefan Moyses (1797–1869) – Bishop, patriot and the first president of the Matica Slovenská, the first Slovak cultural institution.
- Jozef Roháček (1877–1962) – Protestant activist and scholar who translated the first Slovak Bible from the original languages
- Alexander Rudnay (1760–1831)(hung.: Rudnay Sándor) – Parish priest who became Archbishop of Esztergom, Prince Primate of the Kingdom of Hungary and a Cardinal.
- Ján Sokol (1933) – Priest and former archbishop of the Archdiocese of Trnava
- Juraj Haulik (1788–1869) – Croatian Cardinal of Slovak ethnicity and the first archbishop of Zagrab. Acting Ban of Croatia for two separate terms.
- Jozef Tomko (1924) – Cardinal of the Roman Catholic Church and former Prefect of the Congregation for the Evangelization of Peoples
- Róbert Bezák (1960) – former Archbishop of Trnava

== Science and technology ==
=== Philosophers, polyhistors and teachers ===
- Pavol Jozef Šafárik (Paul Joseph Schaffarik, Pavel Josef Safarik) (1795–1861) – poet, professor, polyhistor
- Jakob Jakobeus (1591–1645) – poet, historian, priest, and writer

=== Linguists, humanists and historians ===
- Anton Bernolák (1762–1813) – Lower nobleman, Jesuit, creator of the first standard version of Slovak (in the 1780s), which was based on western Slovak dialects.
- Ľudovít Štúr (Ludevít Štúr) (1815–1856) – Best known for his role in the development of modern Slovak. In 1844 he suggested that the central Slovak dialect be used as the standard language of the Slovaks, and in 1846 he codified the new language standard in his Nauka reči Slovenskej (Theory of the Slovak Language)
- Adam František Kollár (Adam Franz Kollar) (1718–1783) – Lower nobleman, historian and jurist who rose to the ranks of Imperial-Royal Court Councilor and Chief Imperial-Royal Librarian of Empress Maria Theresa. Coined the term ethnology.
- Janko Matúška (1821–1877) – author of the Slovak national anthem
- Martin Hattala (1821–1903) – linguist

=== Inventors and engineers ===
- Jozef Murgaš (1864–1929) – inventor of the wireless telegraph (forerunner of the radio), and holder of other patents include the spinning reel (for fishing), the wave meter, the electric transformer, the magnetic detector, and an engine producing electromagnetic waves.
- Aurel Stodola (1859–1942) – engineer and professor, enabled the construction of steam and gas turbines (around 1900), constructor of a movable artificial arm (the Stodola arm) in 1915
- John Dopyera (Ján Dopjera) (1893–1988) – inventor of music instruments, invented the Dobro resonator guitar

Aviation

- Ján Bahýľ (1865–1916) – military engineer, inventor of a motor-driven helicopter (four years before Bréguet and Cornu). Bahýľ was granted 7 patents in all, including the invention of the tank pump, air balloons combined with an air turbine, the first petrol engine car in Slovakia (with Anton Marschall) and a lift up to Bratislava castle.
- Štefan Banič (1870–1941) – inventor of the military parachute and of the first actively used parachute
- Ivan Alexander Getting (1912–2003) – American physicist and electrical engineer, credited (along with Bradford Parkinson) with the development of the Global Positioning System (GPS).

=== Natural sciences and medicine ===
- Vojtech Alexander (1857–1916) – revolutionary radiologist
- Daniel Carleton Gajdusek (1923–2008) – American physician and Nobel Prize winner of Slovak descent
- Andreas Jaszlinszky (18th century) – Jesuit physics professor
- Ján Jesenský (Johann Jessenius) (1566–1621) – physician, surgeon, anatomist, rector of Charles University, Protestant activist and politician
- Anna Kocková-Kratochvílova (1915–1992) – botanist and microbiologist
- Ján Vilček (1933) – biomedical scientist, educator, inventor and philanthropist

=== Geology and mineralogy ===
- Dimitrij Andrusov (1897–1976) – geologist and paleontologist, founder of modern Slovak geology
- Jan Veizer (1941) – geochemist and paleoclimatologist

=== Archeology ===
- Andrej Kmeť (1841–1908) – botanist, archaeologist
- Ján Kollár – pastor, writer, archaeologist, academic

=== Physics ===
- Dionýz Ilkovič (1907–1980) – physicist
- Stefan Janos (1943) – low temperature physicist living in Switzerland
- Ivan Wilhelm cs:Ivan Wilhelm (1942) – nuclear physicist, former rector of Charles University in Prague

=== Mathematics ===
- Jur Hronec – mathematician
- Igor Kluvánek – mathematician
- Samuel Mikovíny – Hungarian mathematician, engineer and map maker
- Tibor Šalát – mathematician, author of many mathematical textbooks in Slovak
- Peter Štefan – mathematician
- Štefan Znám – mathematician

=== Computer science ===
- Juraj Hromkovič – Slovak computer scientist living in Switzerland

=== Astronomy ===
- Matthias Bel – 17th century astronomer. He made first relatively precise measurement of distance from Earth to Sun.

==== Astronomers (20th century) ====
- Milan Rastislav Štefánik
- Milan Antal
- Ladislav Brožek
- Ľubor Kresák
- Dušan Kalmančok
- Ľudmila Pajdušáková
- Vladimír Porubčan
- Juraj Tóth

==== Astronauts / cosmonauts ====
- Ivan Bella (1964) – the first cosmonaut of Slovakia (in 1998)
- Eugene Cernan (1934) – U.S. astronaut, last man to set foot on the Moon, son of the Slovak immigrant Ondrej Čerňan.
- Michael Fincke (1967) – U.S. astronaut, current American record holder for time in space, grandson of Margaret Hornyak Fincke

=== Economists ===
- Lubos Pastor (1974) – Slovak-American financial economist, currently the Charles P. McQuaid Professor of Finance at the University of Chicago Booth School of Business.

== Culture ==
=== Literature ===
See list of Slovak prose and drama authors.
See list of Slovak poets.

=== Music ===
==== Classical ====
===== Composers =====
- Alexander Albrecht (1885–1958) – composer, conductor, teacher
- Ján Levoslav Bella (1843–1936) – composer, author of the first Slovak opera "Kováč Wieland"
- Juraj Beneš (1940–2004) – composer
- Ján Cikker (1911–1989) – composer, teacher
- Viliam Figuš-Bystrý (1875–1937) – composer, teacher
- Tibor Frešo (1918–1987) – composer, conductor
- Vladimír Godár (1956) – composer
- Frico Kafenda (1883–1963) – composer, teacher, pianist, conductor
- Dezider Kardoš (1914–1991) – composer, teacher
- Ladislav Kupkovič (1936–2016) – composer, conductor
- Peter Machajdik (1961) – composer, organizer
- Ján Móry (Johann Mory) (1892–1978) – composer
- Alexander Moyzes (1906–1984) – composer
- Mikuláš Schneider-Trnavský (1881–1958) – composer
- Eugen Suchoň (1908–1993) – the most important Slovak composer, author of the first Slovak national opera "Krútňava", teacher
- Iris Szeghy (1956) – female composer

===== Conductors =====
- Peter Breiner (1957) – conductor, composer, pianist
- Ondrej Lenárd (1942) – conductor
- Ľudovít Rajter (1906–2000) – conductor, teacher, composer
- Bystrík Režucha (1935–2012) – conductor
- Ladislav Slovák (1919–1999) – conductor

===== Instrumentalists =====
- Dalibor Karvay (1985) – violinist, musical pedagogue
- Peter Michalica (1945) – violinist

===== Opera singers =====
- Peter Dvorský (1951) – tenor
- Edita Gruberová (1946–2021) – soprano
- Jozef Kundlák (1956) – tenor
- Lucia Popp (1939–1993) – soprano
- Ľuba Orgonášová (1961) – soprano

==== Jazz ====
- Peter Lipa (1943) – important current jazz singer, composer
- Laco Deczi (1938) – jazz musician, trumpet player, composer
- Martin Valihora (1976) – jazz musician, drummer

==== Popular music ====
- Adéla (2003) – singer-songwriter
- Adonxs (1995) – singer
- Karin Ann (2002) – singer and songwriter
- Jaroslav Filip (1949–2000) – musician, composer, vocalist, actor, playwright
- Fedor Frešo (1947–2018) – rock bassist and singer, son of conductor Tibor Frešo
- Marika Gombitová (1956) – singer, composer, musician since the second half of the 1970s
- František Griglák (1953) – rock and jazz guitarist, founder of Fermáta
- Dave Grohl (1969) – drummer of Nirvana, singer of Foo Fighters
- Dara Rolins (1972) – singer, entrepreneur
- Tina (1984) – singer, musician since the 2000s
- Dušan Hájek (1946) - drummer and percussionist of many big-beat bands in the 60s and 70s
- Pavol Hammel (1948) – singer, composer, musician (reached his height the 1970s and 1980s)
- Jana Kirschner – musician, composer, vocalist
- Jana Kocianová (1947–2018) – singer, musician, jazzman, gospels singer reached her height the 1970s
- Ján Lehotský (1947) – composer, musician, singer of Modus (a band having reached its height in the late 1970s)
- Rytmus (1977) – rapper, singer, actor, member and co-founder of the hip-hop group Kontrafakt, musician since the 1990s
- Ivan Tásler (1979) – singer, guitarist, composer, producer, musician since the 1990s
- Peter Lipa – musician, composer, vocalist, scatman, jazzman, co-organizer of BJD (Bratislava Jazz Days) festival
- Laco Lučenič (1952) – musician, producer, member of Modus
- Richard Müller (1961) – the best-known current Slovak pop-rock singer
- Vašo Patejdl (1954) – the most important Slovak pop composer in the 1980s and 1990s, singer, musician
- Jozef Ráž (1954) – current singer of Elán (a band having reached its height in the 1980s)
- Dežo Ursiny (1947–1995) – composer, rock singer, musician in the 1960s and 1970s
- Marián Varga (1947–2017) – composer and rock keyboardist, founder of Collegium Musicum
- Sui Vesan – folk musician
- Miroslav Žbirka (1952–2021) – singer, composer from the 1970s to the 1990s

=== Fine arts ===
==== Painters and graphic artists ====
- Janko Alexy (1894–1970) – painter
- Blažej Baláž (1958) – painter, graphic artist
- Mária Balážová (1956) – painter, graphic artist
- Miloš Alexander Bazovský (1899–1968) – painter, graphic artist
- Martin Benka (1888–1971) – painter, illustrator
- Albín Brunovský (1935–1997) – graphic artist, painter, illustrator
- Lajos Csordák (1864–1937) – painter
- Ľudovít Fulla (1902–1980) – painter, graphic artist, illustrator
- Mikuláš Galanda (1895–1938) – painter, graphic artist, illustrator
- Ian Hornak (1944–2002) – draughtsman, painter, printmaker
- Július Jakoby (1903–1985) – painter
- Ján Kupecký (Johann Kupecky) (1667–1740) – painter
- Anton Lehmden (1929–2018) – Austrian painter; born in Slovakia
- Palo Macho (1965) – painter
- Jozef Teodor Mousson (1887–1946) – painter
- Koloman Sokol (1902–2003) – painter
- Karl Sovanka (1883–1961) – painter, sculptor
- Martin Vargic – graphic artist, illustrator
- Andy Warhol

==== Sculptors ====
- Fraňo Štefunko (1903–1974) – sculptor

==== Photographers ====
- Dezo Hoffmann (1912–1986) – photoreporter and photographer
- Tono Stano (1960) – photographer; his photograph Sense inspired the poster for the film Showgirls.

=== Architects ===
- Bohuslav Fuchs (1895–1972) – architect; a Czech also active in Slovakia
- Dušan Jurkovič (1868–1947) – architect

=== Film and theatre ===
==== Actors ====
- Andrej Bagar (1900–1966) – actor, director
- Barbora Bobuľová (1974) – actress
- Milan Kňažko (1945) – actor, former Slovak deputy prime minister, Minister of Foreign Affairs, and Minister of Culture
- Jozef Kroner (1924–1998) – actor, starred in the first Czechoslovak, Czech and Slovak film awarded by Oscar: The Shop on Main Street (Obchod na korze, 1965)
- Juraj Kukura (1947) – well-known Slovak actor (theater, film), who has also been working in Germany.
- Barbara Nedeljáková (1979) – actress, starred in the Hollywood horror film Hostel
- Paul Newman (1925–2008) – US actor, director, entrepreneur, philanthropist, of ethnic Slovak mother
- Emília Vášáryová (1942) – actress
- Jon Voight (1938) – American actor with Slovak ancestry
- Karol L. Zachar (1918–2003) – actor, director
- Tomáš Raček (1947) – Slovak actor (theater, film, TV), who has also been working in Canada
- Michael Stroka (1938–1997) – US TV actor

==== Filmmakers ====
- Paľo Bielik (1910–1983) – director, actor
- Dušan Hanák (1938) – director
- Juraj Herz (1934–2018) – Slovak director and actor born in Kežmarok
- Juraj Jakubisko (1938–2023) – director (sometimes nicknamed Slovak Fellini)
- Ján Kadár (1918–1979) – director
- Viktor Kubal (1923–1997) – cartoonist, animator, filmmaker, and director
- Dušan Rapoš (1953) – Slovak director
- Ivan Reitman (1946) – probably the most prominent film director and producer born in Slovakia
- Martin Šulík (1963) – director
- Pavol Barabáš (1959) – documentarist, noted for filming people living in extreme conditions

== Law ==
- William T. Dzurilla (1953) – international attorney and law clerk to Justice Byron White of the United States Supreme Court (1982–1983).
- Peter Tomka (1956) – Vice-President of the International Court of Justice
- Ernest Valko (1953–2010) – lawyer and former chairman of the Czechoslovak Constitutional Court

== Sports ==
- Ivan Bátory (1975) – cross-country skiing
- Imre Bugár (1955) – ethnic Hungarian athlete
- Karol Divín (1936–2022) – figure-skating
- Paulína Fialková (1992) - biathlete
- Bohumil Golián (1931–2012) – volleyball-player
- Jozef Gönci (1974) – sport shooter
- Jozef Krnáč (1977) – judo
- Anastasiya Kuzmina (Anastasia Kuzminová) (1984) – Russian born biathlete
- Martina Moravcová (1976) – swimmer, twice Olympic silver medalist
- Ondrej Nepela (1951–1989) – figure-skating
- Jozef Plachý (1949) – athlete
- Jozef Pribilinec (1960) – race walker, Olympic gold medalist
- Jack Quinn (1883–1946) – baseball player
- Richard Réti – Austrian-Hungarian, later Czechoslovak chess grandmaster
- Jozef Sabovčík – figure-skating
- Peter Sagan (1990) – cyclist, 3 times UCI World Champion (2015, 2016, 2017)
- Alojz Sokol (Aloisius Szokol) (1871–1932) – athlete, pioneer of the Olympic movement in historic Hungary
- Anton Tkáč (1951) – cyclist
- Yvonne Tobis (born 1948) – Israeli Olympic swimmer, born in Bratislava
- Július Torma (1922–1991) – boxer
- Elmer Valo (1921–1998) – baseball player
- Veronika Velez-Zuzulová (1984) – alpine ski racer
- Petra Vlhová (1995) – alpine ski racer; World Cup winner 2021, gold on the Winter Olympics 2022
- Ján Zachara (1928–2025) – boxer
- Radoslav Židek (1981) – snowboarder, first Slovak medallist from independent Slovakia at the Winter Olympics

=== Football ===
- Jozef Adamec (1942–2018) – former footballer
- Peter Dubovský (1972–2000) – footballer
- Ľudovít Dubovský (1918–1998) – footballer
- Marek Hamšík (1987) – midfielder, currently playing for Chinese side Dalian Professional
- Peter Jakubech (1971) – footballer
- Karol Jokl (1945–1996) – footballer
- Peter Kostolanský (1985) – footballer
- Tomáš Lovásik (1974) – footballer
- Marek Mintál (1977) – footballer
- Ľubomír Moravčík (1965) – footballer
- Ján Popluhár (1935) – footballer
- Patrik Sailer (1989) – footballer
- Viliam Schrojf (1931–2007) – footballer
- Martin Škrtel (1985) – footballer, currently playing for FC Spartak Trnava
- David Strelec (2001) – footballer
- Marián Timm (1990) – footballer
- Jozef Vengloš (1936–2021) – football manager and former footballer, managed Aston Villa, Celtic FC (Glasgow), the Czechoslovak and the Slovak national teams, current director of FIFA's Technical Study Group.
- Vladimír Weiss senior (1964) – Head coach of Slovakia national football team
- Vladimír Weiss junior (1989) – winger

=== Ice hockey ===
- Ľuboš Bartečko – (1976)
- Igor Bobček – (1983)
- Lukáš Bokroš – (1982)
- Peter Bondra – (1968)
- Dalibor Bortňák – (1991)
- Erik Černák – (1997)
- Zdeno Chára – (1977)
- Martin Chovan – (1986)
- Zdeno Cíger – (1969)
- Pavol Demitra – (1974–2011)
- Vladimír Dzurilla – (1942–1995)
- Martin Fehérváry – (1999)
- Marián Gáborík – (1982)
- Jozef Golonka – (1938)
- Jaroslav Halák – (1985)
- Michal Handzuš – (1977)
- Marcel Hossa – (1981)
- Marián Hossa – (1979)
- Adam Jánošík – (1992)
- Christián Jaroš – (1996)
- Tomáš Jurčo – (1992)
- Igor Liba – (1960)
- Vincent Lukáč – (1954)
- Stan Mikita – (1940)
- Ladislav Nagy – (1979)
- Šimon Nemec – (2004)
- Žigmund Pálffy – (1972)
- Dárius Rusnák – (1959)
- Jozef Stümpel – (1972)
- Miroslav Šatan – (1974)
- Juraj Slafkovský – (2004)
- Anton Šťastný – (1959)
- Marián Šťastný – (1953)
- Peter Šťastný – (1956)
- Róbert Švehla – (1969)
- Tomáš Tatar – (1990)
- Ladislav Troják – (1914–1948)
- Ľubomír Višňovský – (1976)
- Ľubomír Vaškovič – (1986)

=== Tennis ===
- Karol Beck (1982)
- Dominika Cibulková (1989)
- Mirka Federer (1978) – Slovak-born Swiss player
- Karina Habšudová (1973)
- Daniela Hantuchová (1983) – Slovakia's most successful female player
- Martina Hingis (1980) – Slovak-born Swiss player
- Dominik Hrbatý (1978)
- Martin Kližan (1989)
- Karol Kučera (1974)
- Miloslav Mečíř (1964)
- Magdaléna Rybáriková (1988)
- Rebecca Šramková (1996)
- Marián Vajda (1965) – coach of a world top tennis-player Novak Djokovic

=== Water sports ===
- Juraj Bača (1977) – speed canoeing
- Jana Dukátová (1983) – water slalom
- Peter and Pavol Hochschorner (1979) – water slalom
- Elena Kaliská (1972) – water slalom
- Slavomír Kňazovický (1967) – speed canoeing
- Michal Martikán (1979) – water slalom, Olympic gold medalist, Atlanta 1996, Beijing 2008
- Juraj Minčík (1977) – water slalom
- Martina Moravcová (1976) – swimmer
- Michal Riszdorfer (1977) – speed canoeing
- Richard Riszdorfer (1981) – speed canoeing
- Erik Vlček (1981) – speed canoeing

=== Figure skating ===
- Karol Divín (1936)
- Ondrej Nepela (1951–1989)
- Jozef Sabovčík (1963)

=== Modelsports ===
- Jozef Gábriš (Joseph Gabris) – born in Bratislava. Most popular and successful Control Line aerobatics pilot (F2B) of former Czechoslovakia.

== Other ==
=== Historical personalities ===
- Móric Beňovský (1746–1786) – Hungarian globetrotter, explorer, soldier, writer, and the king of Madagascar of Slovak ethnicity.
- Juraj Jánošík (1688–1713) – the Slovak equivalent of Robin Hood, the topic of many Slovak legends, books and films
- Matúš Čák Trenčianský (1260–1321) – Oligarch of Upper Hungary known as Lord of the Váh and Tatras, he is considered a folk hero by some Slovaks for not accepting foreign kings as rulers of the Kingdom of Hungary.
- Štefan Parmenius Štítnický (1555–1583) – Hungarian Navigator and chronicler of Slovak origin, member of Humphrey Gilbert's expedition.
- Ádam Jávorka (1663–1747) Kuruc insurgent of Slovak ethnicity later became General of the Polish hussars
- Juraj Šucha (1504–1550) – Hungarian soldier of Slovak ethnicity fought against the Turkish invaders
- Pribina (9th century) – first Slavic prince

=== Models ===
- Kamila Filipcikova – high fashion Slovak model
- Viera Schottertova – model
- Adriana Sklenaříková – model, face of "Wonderbra" advertisements
- Michaela Hlaváčková

=== Miscellaneous ===
- Shlomo Breznitz (born 1936) – Israeli author, psychologist, and president of the University of Haifa
- Viera Gašparíková (1928–2023) – folklorist and Slavist
- Ľudovít Lačný (1926–2019) – chess composer, FIDE master
- Sándor Petőfi (1823–1849) – Hungarian national poet, born to a Slovak mother
- Dorota Pospíšilová (born 1930) – viticulturist
- Rudolf Vrba (1924–2006) – Auschwitz survivor, author of the Vrba-Wetzler report
- Miriam Roth (1910–2005) – Israeli writer and scholar of children's books, kindergarten teacher, and educator
- Vladimír Valach (1937–2006) – diplomat and banker

== See also ==
- List of people by nationality
- List of Slovak Americans
- Slovak Americans

== Notes ==
1.His father was from region of today's Slovakia, however he was born in Bohemia. He is a quastionable choice for this list.
