= List of Slovak composers =

List of Slovak composers, arranged in alphabetical order.

- Johann Nepomuk Hummel (1778-1837)
- Alexander Albrecht (1885–1958)
- Ľubomír Belák (b. 1951)
- Ján Levoslav Bella (1843–1936)
- Juraj Beneš (1940–2004)
- Peter Breiner (b. 1957)
- Marek Brezovský (1974–1994)
- Ján Cikker (1911–1989)
- Viliam Figuš-Bystrý (1875–1937)
- Jaroslav Filip (1949–2000)
- Tibor Frešo (1918–1978)
- Vladimír Godár (b. 1956)
- Daniel Sinapius Horčička (1640–1688)
- Ivan Hrušovský (1927–2001)
- Šimon Jurovský (1912–1963)
- Frico Kafenda (1883–1963)
- Dezider Kardoš (1914–1991)
- Ladislav Kupkovič (1936–2016)
- Ján Lehotský (b. 1947)
- Peter Machajdík (b. 1961)
- Alexander Moyzes (1906–1984)
- Ján Móry (1892–1978)
- Edmund Pascha (1714–1772)
- Vašo (Václav) Patejdl (b. 1954)
- Ľudovít Rajter (1906–2000)
- Dušan Rapoš (b. 1953)
- Jozef Ráž (b. 1954)
- Mikuláš Schneider-Trnavský (1881–1958)
- Eugen Suchoň (1908–1993)
- Iris Szeghy (b. 1956)
- Andrej Šeban (b. 1962)
- Mikuláš Škuta (b. 1960)
- Ivan Tásler (b. 1979)
- Ján Valašťan Dolinský (1892–1965)
- Ilja Zeljenka (1932–2007)
- Miroslav Žbirka (b. 1952)
