= Alan Murin discography =

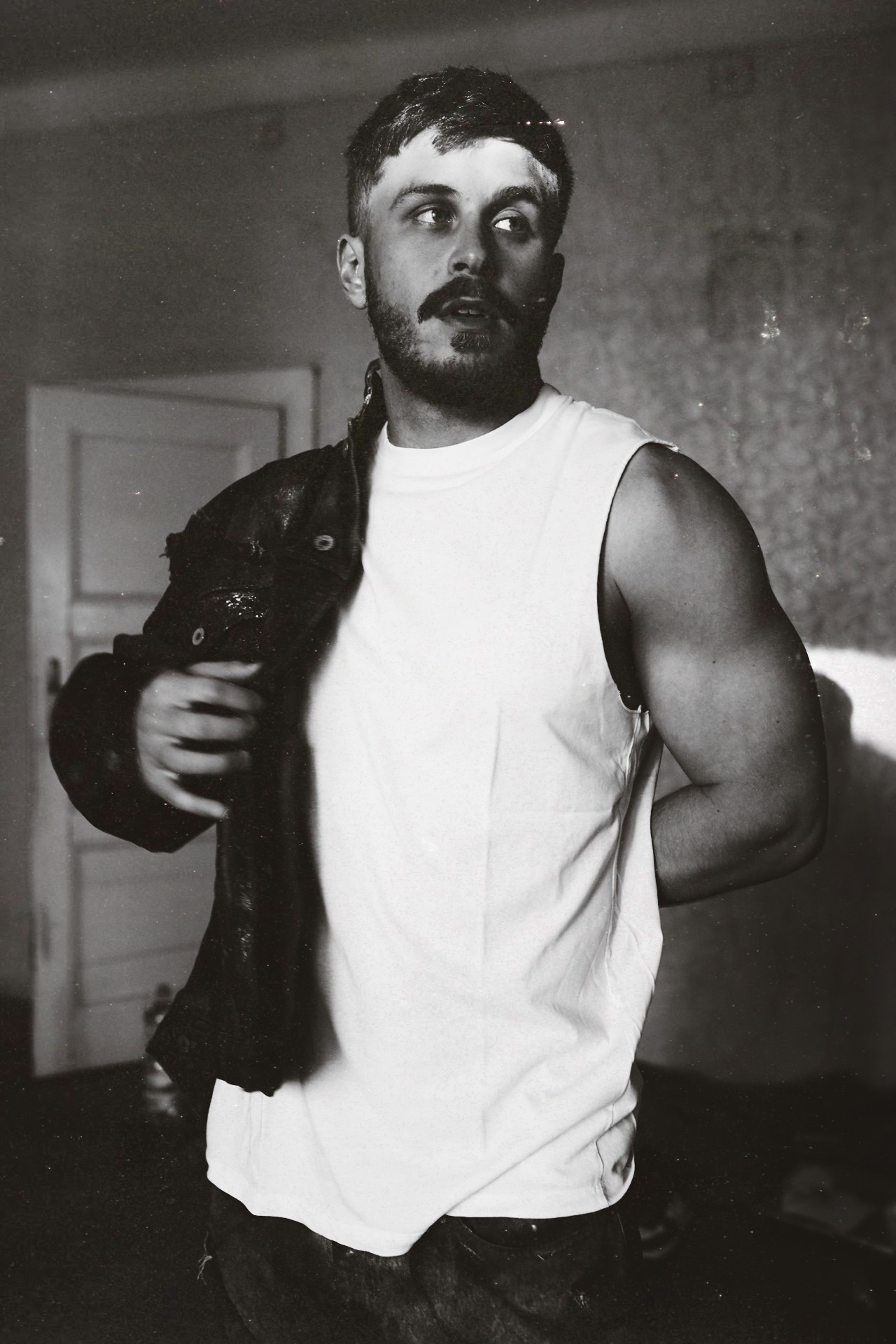
- Alan Murin in 2023
- Studio albums: 1
- EPs: 4

Slovak singer and music producer Alan Murin has released one studio album, four EPs, 34 collaborations as a featured artist, 47 music videos as a lead artist, and 19 as a featured artist. Despite his relatively short career, he has become one of the most active Slovak performers. Murin has collaborated with numerous renowned artists and producers.

Alan began writing lyrics and composing melodies in 2017, releasing demo songs under the pseudonym "Sane". He released his recordings on the SoundCloud platform.

Alan Murin’s YouTube videos often occupy the top spots on the Slovak YouTube trending chart.He first topped the charts with the music video for his single "Prepáč", reaching the peak within just hours of its release and maintaining the position for several weeks. He again dominated the chart with his duet "Do Rúk" featuring Tina, even without an accompanying music video. The overwhelming response to the song led to the creation of a music video, which remains the most-watched clip of Murin’s work on the platform, amassing over 7 million views. The hit "Raz Dva Tri" did it for the third time. To date, Alan Murin’s YouTube channel has garnered over 55 million views.

In 2019, he appeared on the music scene as Alan Murin. In 2019, Alan Murin made his debut on the music scene under his own name. He considers his EP 15 23—the first in a trilogy of genre-focused EPs (15 23, 23 10, and 19 98)—to mark the true beginning of his musical career. The lead single from the EP, "Sám Sebou" (Alone), was released in July 2019, followed by the breakthrough track "Vypínam," which gained significant attention. That same year, singer Tina discovered Alan and approached him for a collaboration, describing their project as one of the most pivotal songs in the Slovak music scene. In April 2020, a music video for the song was released as a thank-you to fans, as it had garnered the most support and interest from the entire EP trilogy. [11] The debut project was a resounding success compared to many other emerging artists, with each song achieving tens of thousands of views on YouTube and streams on digital platforms. The release of the debut project, compared to many other emerging artists, enjoyed great success. Each song has received tens of thousands of views on YouTube and streams on streaming services.

During 2020, Alan released his first official single, titled "Telefón".

The release of his highly anticipated debut album was announced in August 2022, accompanied by the pilot single "Prepáč". The single has achieved the greatest success on the ČNS IFPI digital charts from Alan's own work to date. It ranked 5th in the Top 100 Digital Singles chart in Slovakia and 3rd in the Top 50 Domestic Digital Singles chart.

Alan's debut studio album, Trueself, was released in September 2022. It debuted at number 1 on the ČNS IFPI Slovak Albums Chart in its first week, holding the top spot for two consecutive weeks. The album remained in the Top 3 for four weeks and stayed in the Top 10 for fourteen weeks.

In February 2024, he released his first international single, "Still Love You", in collaboration with Romanian singer Iova and renowned Romanian producer Serban Cazan. This was followed by the release of an EP titled Love Is Cool in June 2024, marking the start of a new era in Alan’s sound. The song "Dokola" became a standout track from this project, ranking 2nd among the most-played domestic songs on Slovak radio. Alan's latest single, "Domov", released in September 2024, achieved similar success.

Alan’s most successful collaboration to date is the single "Mám ťa rád", featuring rapper Kali, Peter Pann, and Šorty. The track topped the Slovak digital charts, and its music video has garnered over 9 million views on YouTube since its release in February 2024.

== Albums ==
=== Studio albums ===
List of studio albums, with selected details, chart positions, sales, and certifications
Title	Studio album details	Peak chart positions		Sales	Certifications
Title	Studio album details	SK	CZ	Sales	Certifications
Trueself	Released: October 22, 2022; Label: Trueself Records; Formats: CD, digital download, streaming	1	62		
"—" denotes a recording that did not chart or was not released in that territory.

== Extended plays ==
List of extended plays with selected details
Title	Extended play details
15 23	Released: July 23, 2013; Label: Trueself Records; Format: Digital download, streaming
23 10	Released: September 23, 2019; Label: Trueself Records; Format: Digital download, streaming
19 98	Released: December 2, 2019; Label: Trueself Records; Format: Digital download, streaming
Láska Je Cool	Released: June 28, 2024; Label: Trueself Records; Format: Digital download, streaming

== Singles ==
=== Charted songs ===
List of charted songs, showing year released, chart positions and album
Title	Year	Peak chart positions				Album
Title	Year	SK RADIO TOP 100	SK RADIO TOP 50 SK	SK SINGLES DIGITAL TOP 100	SK SINGLES DIGITAL TOP 50	Album
"Vypínam"	2019	—	32	—	31	15 23 (EP)
"SR C"	2019	—	—	54	24	19 98 (EP)
"10 z 10"	2021	—	18	—	—	—
"Prepáč"	2022	—	—	5	3	Trueself
"Raz Dva Tri" (feat. Kali & Peter Pann)	2022	—	26	17	7	Trueself
"Vamos Bombas" (feat. Rytmus)	2022	—	—	—	49	Trueself
"Do Rúk" (feat. Tina)	2022	—	30	19	7	Trueself
"Prvá láska" (feat. Thia Vittek)	2022	—	—	—	46	Trueself
"Suave"	2022	—	—	89	33	Trueself
"Testy" (feat. Pil C, Separ)	2022	—	—	18	8	Trueself
"1000 Básní" (feat. Laris Diam)	2022	—	—	—	49	Trueself
"Neberte mi mood"	2023	—	—	81	49	—
"Dokola"	2024	29	2	19	5	—
"Povedz Prečo"	2024	—	—	50	19	—
"Domov"	2024	4	1	27	12	—
No. 1 singles		0	1	0	0	
TOP 10 singles		1	2	1	5	
"—" denotes items which did not chart in that country.

=== As featured artist ===
List of charted songs, showing year released, chart positions and album
Title	Year	Peak chart positions				Album
Title	Year	SK RADIO TOP 100	SK RADIO TOP 50 SK	SK SINGLES DIGITAL TOP 100	SK SINGLES DIGITAL TOP 50	Album
"Nevadí" (Kali feat. Alan Murin)	2020	—	—	—	—	Lepší
"BEJBY BLUE" (Tina feat. Alan Murin)	2021	—	—	64	18	—
"Kým ťa mám" (Kali & Peter Pann feat. Alan Murin & Čis T)	2021	—	—	27	9	Banan
"Lietačky" (Moja Reč feat. Alan Murin)	2021	—	—	43	15	Zasedoma
"Máš tam byť" (ADiss feat. Alan Murin)	2021	—	—	—	—	#VELALASKY
"ŽIVOT JE ZVLÁŠTNY" (Pil C feat. Alan Murin)	2021	—	—	10	6	ODSÚDENÍ NA ÚSPECH
"CARA MIA" (Pil C feat. Alan Murin)	2021	—	—	2	2	ODSÚDENÍ NA ÚSPECH
"Tam Kam" (Peter Pann feat. Alan Murin & Laris Diam)	2022	—	—	—	—	33
"24sedem" (Dominika Mirgová feat. Alan Murin)	2022	—	—	—	—	Svetlo (EP)
"Srdce ako z kameňa" (Kali feat. Alan Murin a Majself)	2022	—	—	48	23	Banan
"Šťastné konce" (Kali & Peter Pann feat. Majk Spirit, Alan Murin)	2022	—	—	—	—	Banan
"Send it to the top" (Raunii x Alan Murin x ADiss)	2022	—	—	—	—	—
"Vietor" (Matej Straka feat. Alan Murin & Sara Rikas)	2022	—	—	—	—	—
"First" (Paulie Garand feat. Alan Murin)	2022	—	—	—	—	Amonit
"Una" (Paulie Garand feat. Alan Murin)	2022	—	—	—	—	Amonit
"Sóda" (Pokyman feat. Alan Murin)	2022	—	—	—	—	—
"Vadí nevadí" (Kali & Peter Pann feat. Alan Murin)	2023	—	—	62	32	Retrostar
"Outro" (Separ feat. Alan Murin)	2023	—	—	19	19	Flowdemort
"SORRY" (Majk Spirit & Alan Murin)	2023	—	—	74	45	Playlist
"Tron" (P.A.T. feat. Momo, Alan Murin)	2023	—	—	—	—	Baro Raj
"Nebesa" (Renne Dang feat. Alan Murin)	2023	—	—	—	—	Navzdory
"Nebesa (DJ Wich Remix)" (Renne Dang feat. Alan Murin)	2023	—	—	—	—	Navzdory (Deluxe)
"Hip Hop Žije - 10 Rokov" (Separ, Dame, Smart, Majk Spirit, Kali, Radikal Chef, Frayer Flexking, Tina, Alan Murin, Supa, Delik, Matej Straka, Gabryell)	2023	—	—	—	—	—
"Sme Slobodní" (Tajči Gali feat. Alan Murin)	2023	—	—	—	—	—
"Namotaný" (Alex Choupenitch feat. Alan Murin)	2023	—	—	—	—	—
"Sebaklam" (Dame feat. Alan Murin, Dannie Ella)	2023	—	—	—	—	FRÍ DOM
"Za tebou" (Momo x Alan Murin)	2023	—	—	8	5	—
"fuckHappy" (Majk Spirit feat. Alan Murin, Cigo)	2023	—	—	—	—	nový čLOVEk 2.0
"Nehám sa viesť" (Kali feat. Momo a Alan Murin)	2023	—	—	—	—	Retrostar
"Mám ťa rád" (Kali, Alan Murin, Šorty, Peter Pann)	2024	—	26	1	1	—
"TOTO SOM JA" (ALYA x Alan Murin x Maxx Miklos)	2024	—	—	—	—	—
"Jungle Gin" (Paulie Garand & Kenny Rough feat. Alan Murin)	2024	—	—	—	—	Molo II
"Story" (Tian Moon feat. Alan Murin)	2024	—	—	—	—	—
"Nohou na pedálu" (DJ Kadr x Totally Nothin x Alan Murin & Konex)	2024	—	—	—	—	—
No. 1 singles		0	0	1	1	
TOP 10 singles		0	0	3	5	
"—" denotes items which did not chart in that country.

=== Production ===
List of producted songs, showing year of release, artist and album
Title	Year	Artist	Album
"Večnosť"	2021	Dominika Mirgová	Na Mesiac (EP)

== Music videos ==
=== As lead artist ===
List of music videos, showing year and date of release, director and album
Title	Year	Date of release	Director(s)	Album
"Sám sebou"	2019	July 23	Christián Marušák	15 23 (EP)
"Život"	2019	September 23		23 10 (EP)
"Vypínam"	2020	April 2	Peter Balent	15 23 (EP)
"SR C"	2020	May 17	Peter Balent	19 98 (EP)
"Telefonát"	2020	July 12	Peter Balent	—
"Čomabaví"	2020	August 22	Peter Balent	—
"3 A.M."	2020	November 15		—
"MYNITY"	2020	December 13	Christián Marušák	—
"DOMAMÁM"	2020	December 16	Peter Majerčík	—
"BOKY"	2021	February 14	Lukáš Jurečko	—
"10 Z 10"	2021	May 13	Peter Balent	—
"Chcem Tvoju Lásku"	2021	July 10	Peter Balent	—
"Idem Hore"	2021	September 15	Peter Balent	—
"Already Gone"	2021	November 7	Peter Onduš	—
"Snívam"	2021	December 5	Peter Onduš	—
"One Day"	2021	December 19	Peter Onduš	—
"Poď Dole"	2022	February 22		—
"AYAY" (Alan Murin x Raunii)	2022	March 22	Pierre Lexis	—
"ELEY" (Alan Murin x Raunii)	2022	April 22	Pierre Lexis	—
"Prepáč"	2022	August 11	Peter Balent	Trueself
"Lifestyle"	2022	September 22	Peter Balent	Trueself
"Raz Dva Tri" (feat. Kali)	2022	October 16		Trueself
"Vamos Bombas" (feat. Rytmus)	2022	November 6		Trueself
"Suave"	2022	November 20		Trueself
"1000 Básní" (feat. Laris Diam)	2022	November 27	Pierre Lexis	Trueself
"Do Rúk" (feat. Tina)	2022	December 4	Martin Miko	Trueself
"Cesta je cieľ"	2023	February 26		—
"Ďakujem"	2023	March 19		Trueself
"Začínam" (feat. Ego)	2023	April 9	Sewerovsky Marko	Trueself
"TESTY" (feat. Separ, Pil C)	2023	April 23		Trueself
"Neber mi mood"	2023	May 14		—
"Človek"	2023	May 28	Sewerovsky Marko	—
"Kde Ťa Mám"	2023	June 1		—
"Zavolaj"	2023	June 8	Lara Legend	—
"Love" (feat. Momo)	2023	June 18		—
"Keby"	2023	June 29	Peter Balent	—
"Ratata"	2023	October 12	Sewerovsky Marko	—
"Voľný pád"	2023	November 2	Lara Legend, Maroš Šesták	—
"Caliente"	2023	December 7		—
"Still love you" (Alan Murin x IOVA)	2024	February 22		—
"Dobrý pocit" (Alan Murin x Raphael x Freshmaker)	2024	March 15		—
"Dokola"	2024	March 22		—
"Povedz Prečo"	2024	April 26	Martin Miko, Alan Murin	—
"Animal Style"	2024	May 4	Anze Skrube	—
"Srdcom Buran"	2024	June 2	Martin Miko, Alan Murin	—
"Let Go"	2024	July 30		—
"Domov"	2024	September 6	Sewerovsky Marko	—

=== As featured artist ===
List of music videos, showing year and date of release, director and album
Title	Year	Date of release	Director(s)	Album
"BEJBY BLUE" (Tina feat. Alan Murin)	2021	March 8		—
"Kým ťa mám" (Kali feat. Alan Murin a Čis T)	2021	August 1		Banán
"Máš tam byť" (ADiss & Alan Murin)	2021	November 14		#VELALASKY
"24SEDEM" (Dominika Mirgová feat. Alan Murin)	2022	May		Svetlo (EP)
"TAM KAM" (Peter Pann feat. Alan Murin, Laris Diam)	2022	May 8		33
"Srdce ako z kameňa" (Kali feat. Alan Murin a Majself)	2022	May 13		Banán
"SEND IT TO THE TOP" (Raunii x Alan Murin x ADiss)	2022	July 16		—
"Vietor" (Matej Straka feat. Alan Murin & Sara Rikas)	2022	October 10	Bao Miro / Oliver Záhlava	—
"Sóda" (Pokyman feat. Alan Murin)	2022	November 9		Blessings
"Vadí, nevadí" (Kali feat. Alan Murin)	2023	March 5		Retrostar
"Tron" (P.A.T. x Momo x Alan Murin)	2023	May 21		Baro Raj
"Hip Hop Žije - 10 Rokov" (Separ, Dame, Smart, Majk Spirit, Kali, Radikal Chef, Frayer Flexking, Tina, Alan Murin, Supa, Delik, Matej Straka, Gabryell)	2023	June 23		—
"Sme Slobodní" (Tajči Gali feat. Alan Murin)	2023	July 27		—
"Namotaný" (Alex Choupenitch feat. Alan Murin)	2023	September 1	Alex Choupenitch, Jan Kříž	—
"Za tebou" (Momo x Alan Murin)	2023	September 7		Street Hamlet
"Una" (Paulie Garand feat. Alan Murin)	2023	September 28	Viet Duong	Amonit
"Mám ťa rád" (Kali, Alan Murin, Šorty, Peter Pann)	2024	Februar 18	Juraj Škula	—
"TOTO SOM JA" (ALYA x Alan Murin x Maxx Miklos)	2024	October 18		—
"Story" (Tian Moon feat. Alan Murin)	2024	October 31	Martin Miko	—
