= Trueself =

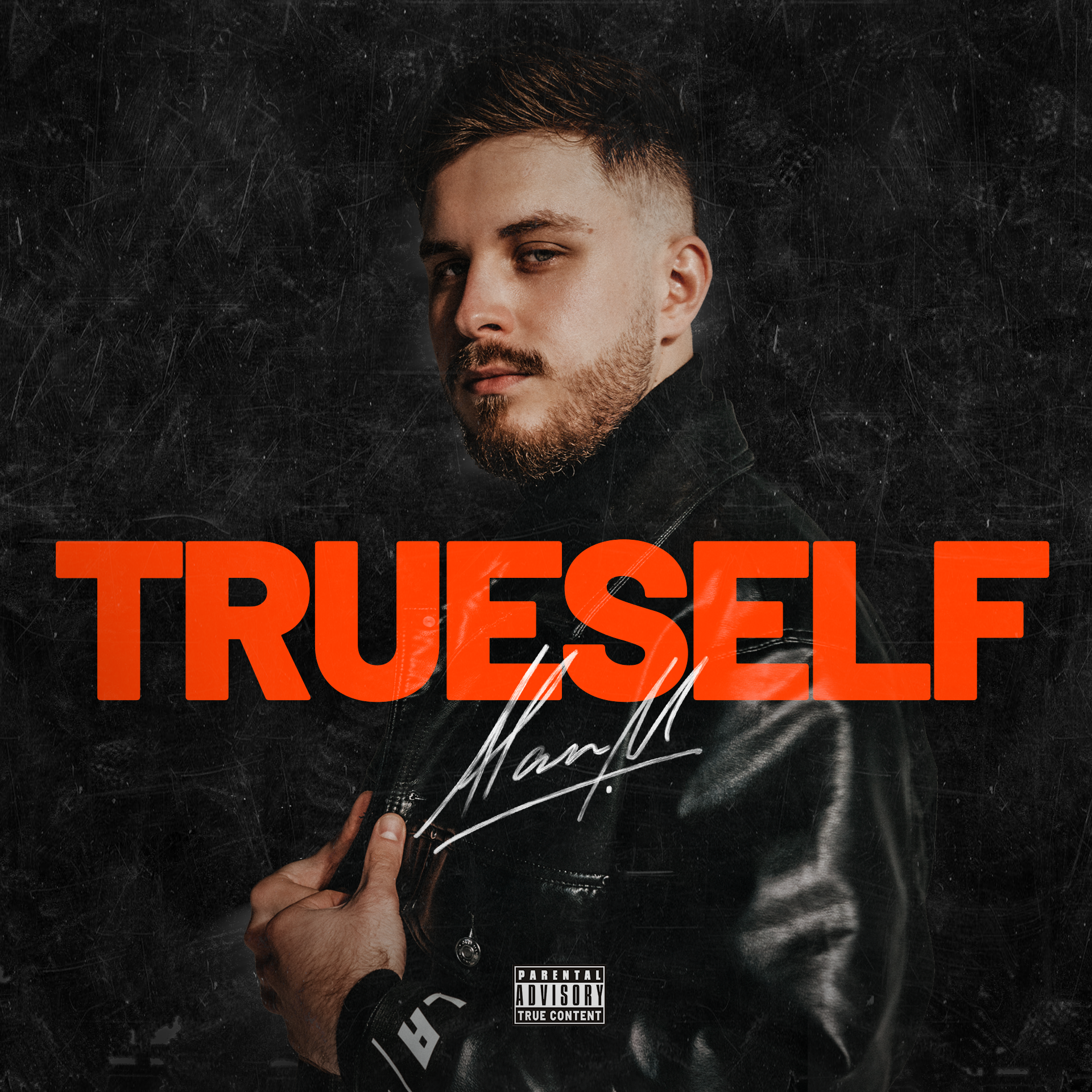

Studio album by Alan Murin
- Released: October 22, 2022
- Length: 41:41
- Label: Trueself Records
- Producer: Alan Murin; Katanobeat; Hoodini; RC Beats; Buckroll; Call Me G; Chadavelli; Peter Pann; Pacific; RSK Beats; Anywaywell

Alan Murin chronology
19 98 (EP) (2019)	Trueself (2022)	Láska Je Cool (EP) (2024)

Singles from Trueself
- 1. "Prepáč" Released: August 12, 2022; 2. "Lifestyle" Released: September 22, 2022; 3. "Raz-Dva-Tri" Released: October, 2022; 4. "Vamos Bombas" Released: October, 2022

Trueself, stylized as TRUESELF, is the debut studio album by Slovak singer and producer Alan Murin. It was released on October 22, 2022, by Trueself Records. It follows the release of Alan Murin's 2019 EP trilogy 15 23, 23 10 and 19 98.

The pop album features 14 original songs and collaborations with several Slovak artists, including rappers Rytmus, Kali, Ego, Pil C, Separ and Momo, as well as female singers Celeste Buckingham, Tina, Laris Diam and Thia Vittek. The album topped the Slovak album chart and, in December 2024, received 2× platinum certification. The album has been promoted by the various singles as "Prepáč", "Lifestyle", "Raz Dva Tri", "Vamos Bombas" and other video singles.

== Composition ==
=== Music and lyrics ===
The songs on Trueself serve as personal statements from Alan Murin about life, relationships, and his perspectives. Murin describes the period of creating the album as a transformative time for him. "This album is a reflection of what is important to me in music. Each song carries a specific emotional charge and a distinct purpose. There is something in each of them that I have personally experienced," Murin stated.

As he stated, the songs on the album are "sonically very interconnected," but there are also tracks where he is in a "completely new position"—so much so that even his closest collaborators did not recognize him in some songs.

The album features melancholic, nostalgic tracks as well as pop songs with an 80's vibe.

=== Songs ===
The first single, Prepáč, was written by Murin in a single day. "I wanted to create a song using the first instrumental track I found online," he explained about the song's genesis. "The process was very spontaneous and natural." In the end, he worked with a beat by a producer known as RC Beats from the Dominican Republic, which he modified himself and wrote lyrics for, shaping them as a form of personal catharsis. According to the singer, the emotions in the verses unfold like layers of an onion.

One of the standout tracks on the album is Do rúk, featuring Tina. Alan Murin revealed that the song had been sitting in his archives for several years as a short demo. Upon revisiting the demo, Murin found new meaning in the composition, which helped shape the song's final direction. He described the creative process as spontaneous, with melodies and lyrics sometimes emerging naturally. "When I was going through my old demos, this one immediately caught my attention and took on a deeper meaning, naturally guiding me toward how I wanted to finish the song. Sometimes, during the creative process, words and melodic lines form in my head on their own, as if they were already recorded in the music. I don’t know where they come from, and sometimes their meaning isn’t entirely clear to me at first. That’s why I left this song unfinished in the past and waited for it to fully mature within me," he shared. After completing his part, he sought to add contrast and emotional depth by inviting Tina to collaborate. "We first talked about life, about what the song evoked in her. She admitted that its theme spoke directly to her soul. Writing her part was an intense and cathartic process, almost like therapy. I think this raw authenticity is what resonated with people, even without a visual," Murin explained.

== Recording and title ==
The album was largely created over the past six months, though some of the songs started to be created five years ago.

Apart from Alan Murin, producers Katanobeat, Hoodini, RC Beats, Buckroll, Call Me G, Chadavelli, Peter Pann, Pacific, RSK Beats, and Anywaywell contributed to the album.

For his debut album, Alan decided for the first time in his career to invite guests to feature on his tracks.

The album's title, Trueself, reflects the singer's own music label, Trueself Records, under which the album was released. In an interview with Dobré Rádio, Alan revealed that the album was initially intended to be titled Intro.

== Release and promotion ==
Along with the release of the pilot single, Alan Murin also announced the release date for his debut album, set for September 22, 2022. On that day, pre-sale of the album began exclusively on Ruka Hore. Trueself was released on CD on October 22, 2022, and on November 4, 2022, for digital download and streaming.

Following the album's release, Alan Murin revealed his plans to create a music video for every track on the album. Ultimately, 10 music videos were released. The songs for which no music video was made are "Trueself," "Prvá Láska," "Utekám," and "Sucho."

Trueself was exclusively presented on Dobré rádio on October 13, 2022, giving listeners a sneak peek into the project before its release.

The official album launch event took place on March 22, 2023, at the Nibble & sip house in the Zichy Palace in Bratislava. During the event, Alan performed acoustic versions of several songs from the album for the first time, accompanied by guitarist Dávid Bílek. The event featured guests as Kali, Pil C, and Laris Diam, who collaborated on the album.

== Singles ==
"Prepáč" was released as the lead single from the album on August 12, 2022. The emotional track was well-received, reaching the top on YouTube trendings chart in Slovakia within hours of release, where it stayed for several weeks. It also ranked 5th in the ČSN IFPI Top 100 digital singles in Slovakia. In March 2023, the song won took 3nd place at the 10th Ruka Hore Awards in the category Song of the year.

The second single, "Lifestyle", was released alongside the launch of the album's pre-sale on September 22, 2022. The music video includes a little cameo by American rapper Raunii, with whom Alan previously collaborated on the tracks "Ayay" and "Eley" The video also honors the memory of Oliver Freak, the founder of a popular Slovak clothing brand.

In October 2022, Alan released the reggaeton-influenced track "Raz Dva Tri," featuring Kali and produced by Peter Pann. The accompanying music video, starring Slovak model Viki Frajková, quickly climbed Slovak YouTube's trending charts and was also picked up by radio stations, ranking 26th in the ČSN IFPI Top 50 Slovak radio singles chart.

Later in October, the single "Vamos Bombas" featuring Rytmus and produced by Call Me G, was released. The music video for the song was created during the three months of the concert season. Interestingly, Alan Murin and Rytmus recorded the track spontaneously while in Prague. The music video ranked 4th on YouTube's Slovak trending chart.

On November 20, 2022, the music video for the dance song "Suave" was released. As Alan stated on Instagram, it serves as a continuation of the story from the "Vamos Bombas" music video, which he had released previously.

On November 27, 2022, a music video for the song "1000 Básní" was released, featuring Laris Diam.

In November 2022, duet "Do Rúk" featuring Tina gained an unexpected success by topping YouTube's Slovak trending chart, even without an accompanying music video. On December 4, the music video, shot in Italy, was released, achieving significant success.

Alan Murin and Tina presented the music video on the TV show Ranné noviny on TV JOJ on December 14, 2022. In 2023, the single was also released on CD, marking the only single by Alan to be released on CD so far. In March 2023, the song won took 3nd place at the 10th Ruka Hore Awards in the category Collaboration of the year.

Alan continued to release music videos throughout 2023, starting with "Ďakujem" on March 19. He followed this up with the video for "Začínam," featuring Ego, on April 9. On April 23, the music video for "Testy" featuring Separ and Pil C, was released.

== Critical reception ==
Shortly after the album's release in November 2022, Trueself received positive feedback from online magazine Hashtag, which praised its diversity and emotional depth. They wrote: "Alan knows what his fanbase craves, and the album features songs that will make you think, move, chill, motivate you, and even open your soul." Additionally, they highlighted the album's wide genre range and the diverse spectrum of artists contributing to various rap styles and approaches. Later in April 2023, Hashtag further recognized Trueself as one of the most accomplished and impactful Slovak albums of the past year, stating that it "brought a lot of truly high-quality material as well as very strong collaborations."

On November 21, 2022, the publishing house Ruka Hore announced that Alan had reached 7th place among Slovak rappers in terms of Spotify listening statistics, thanks to the success of Trueself.

== Album design and packaging ==
The album's cover features a photograph of the singer dressed in dark clothing against a dark background, with the album title, TRUESELF, prominently displayed in bold orange lettering at the center. The singer's signature appears below the title.

The back cover presents the track listing in orange font along the left side. Each song is accompanied by the name of its guest artist, rendered in white handwriting to evoke the appearance of autographs or handwritten notes, creating a more personal feel.

The cover photographs were taken by Katarína Šlesárová, while the design was handled by Juraj Antoňák. The album was released on CD in a standard plastic jewel case.

== Commercial performance ==
Album achieved major success in Slovakia, debuting at the top of the Slovak albums chart of the ČNS IFPI. In March 2023, Alan Murin won three awards at the 10th Ruka Hore Awards, with his debut album securing 2nd place in the Album of the Year category.

On December 30, 2024, Alan Murin shared a video on his Instagram profile in which he unwrapped two certified plaques awarded by the publishing house Ruka Hore: a 2× platinum plaque for the album TRUESELF and a 3× platinum plaque for the single "Do rúk" featuring Tina.

== Track listing ==
Trueself track listing
No.	Title	Writer(s)	Producer(s)	Length
1.	"Trueself"	Alan Murin	Alan Murin	2:28
2.	"Lifestyle"	Alan Murin; Katanobeat	Katanobeat	3:01
3.	"1000 Básní" (featuring Laris Diam)	Alan Murin; Lucia Mariaková; Stanislav Hudec	Hoodini	2:30
4.	"Prepáč"	RC Beats; Alan Murin	RC Beats	3:39
5.	"Testy" (featuring Pil C, Separ)	Alan Murin; Buckroll; Lukáš Kajanovič; Michael Kmeť	Buckroll	3:58
6.	"Do Rúk" (featuring Tina)	Alan Murin; Dávid Bílek; Martina Csillagová	Alan Murin	3:30
7.	"Vamos Bombas" (featuring Rytmus)	Alan Murin; Call Me G; Patrik Vrbovský	Call Me G	3:20
8.	"Suave"	Alan Murin; Call Me G; Dávid Bílek	Call Me G	2:14
9.	"Prvá Láska" (featuring Thia Vittek)	Alan Murin; Chadavelli; Thia Vittek; Štefan Čikoš	Chadavelli	2:38
10.	"Raz-Dva-Tri" (featuring Kali)	Alan Murin; Koloman Magyari; Neil Anthony Collins; Peter Pann	Peter Pann	2:40
11.	"Utekám" (featuring Celeste Buckingham)	Alan Murin; Celeste Buckingham; Pacific	Pacific	3:30
12.	"Sucho" (featuring Momo)	Alan Murin; Rafael Sena Rizzo; Roman Grigely	RSK Beats	4:08
13.	"Ďakujem"	Alan Murin; Anywaywell	Anywaywell	1:22
14.	"Začínam" (featuring Ego)	Alan Murin; Michal Straka	Alan Murin	2:43
Total length:				41:41

== Personnel ==
- Katarína Šlesárová – photography
- Juraj Antoňák – design

== Charts ==
Weekly chart performance for Trueself
Chart	Peak position
Czech Albums (ČNS IFPI)	**1**
Slovak Albums (ČNS IFPI)	62

== Release history ==
Release formats for Trueself
Region	Date	Format(s)	Label
Various	October 22, 2022	CD	Trueself Records
Various	November 4, 2022	digital download; streaming	Trueself Records
