= Cisar =

Cisar, Cisár and Čisár are surnames. The Slovak surname Cisár (feminine: Cisárová) and the Czech surname Císař mean 'emperor', and the surname Cisar may appear as an Anglicised or Germanised form of this surnames. Notable people with the surnames include:

- Alex Cisar (born 2000), Slovenian biathlete
- Alexandru Cisar (1880–1954), Romanian Roman Catholic archbishop
- Augustín Čisár, Slovak diplomat and ambassador
- Franz Cisar (1908–1943), Austrian footballer
- George Cisar (actor) (1912–1979), American actor
- George Cisar (baseball) (1910–2010), American baseball player
- Marián Cisár (born 1978), Slovak ice hockey player
- Steven Cisar (born 1986), American BMX rider
