= Chovan =

Chovan (Slovak feminine: Chovanová) is a surname. It is usually of Slovak or Czech origin. Notable people with the surname include:

- Adrián Chovan (born 1995), Slovak football player
- Martin Chovan (born 1986), Slovak ice hockey player
- Matúš Chovan (born 1992), Slovak ice hockey player
- Michal Chovan (born 1987), Slovak ice hockey player
- Vladimír Chovan (born 1963), Slovak politician
