= Valach =

Valach (feminine Valachová) is a Czech and Slovak surname, meaning Vlach. Notable people with the surname include:

- Ján Valach (born 1973), Slovak road cyclist
- Juraj Valach (born 1973), Slovak ice hockey player
- Kateřina Valachová (born 1976), Czech politician
- Lucia Valachová (born 1997), Slovak cyclist
- Pavel Valach (born 1953), Czech volleyball player
- Radovan Valach (1910–2000), Slovak-Austrian freestyle wrestler
- Vladimír Valach (1937–2006), Slovak diplomat and economist
