= Alan Murin =

Slovak pop musician

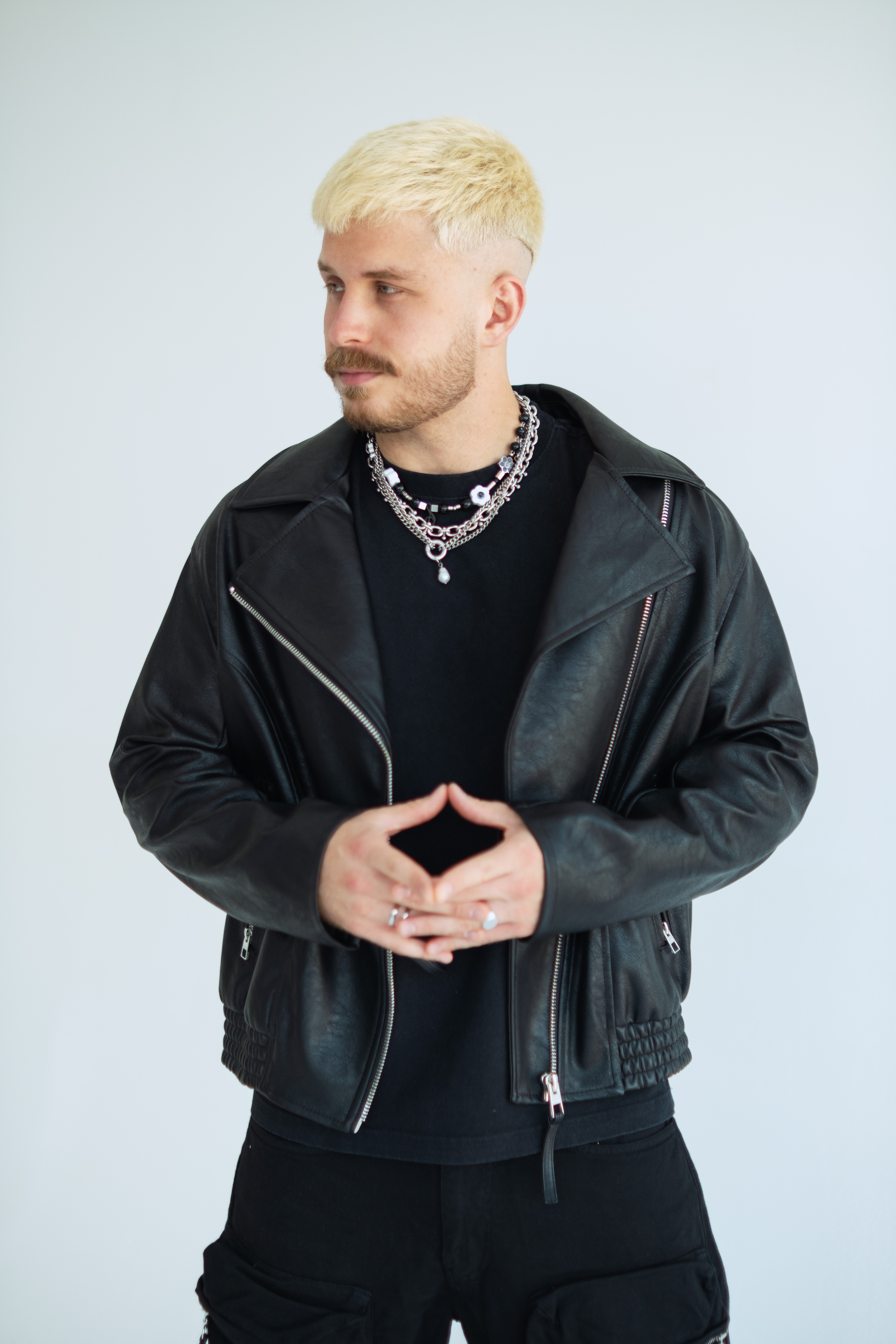
- Alan Murin (2024)
- Born: Alan Murín; October 23, 1998 (age 28); Bratislava, Slovakia
- Other names: Alan Murin, Sane
- Occupations: Singer; composer; music producer; sound engineer
- Years active: 2019–present
- Musical career
- Origin: Slovakia
- Genres: New Pop; Pop; Rhythm and blues, Hip-hop
- Instruments: Vocals
- Labels: Universal Music Slovensko (2019–2020); Trueself Records
- Website: alanmurin.com

Signature
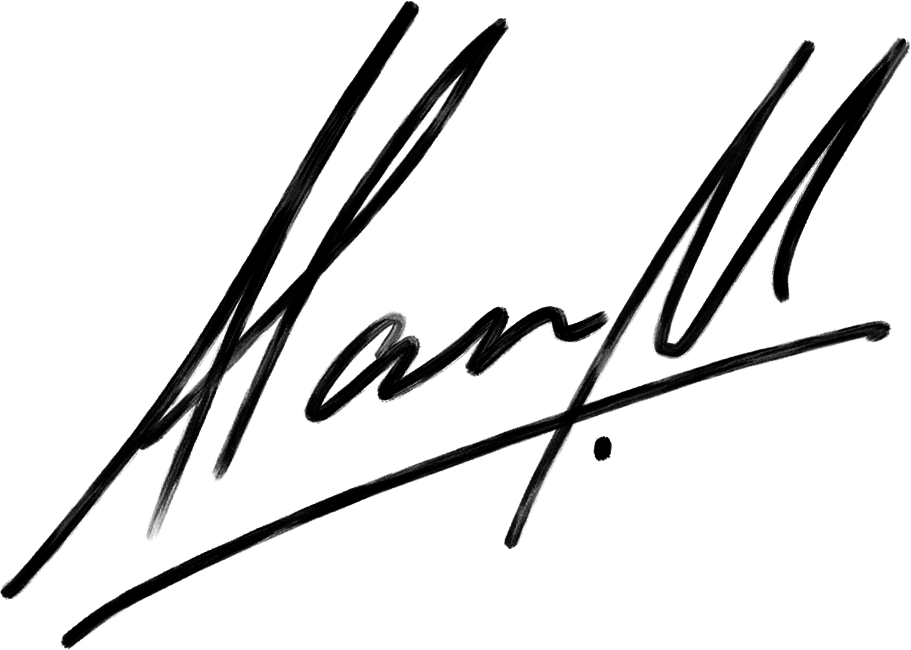

Alan Murín, known as Alan Murin, previously performing under the pseudonym Sane [pronounced: seɪn] (born October 23, 1998), is a Slovak singer, composer, music producer and sound engineer. He began his music career in 2019 with the release of his debut EP trilogy, 15 23, 23 10 and 19 98. He has released one studio album and four EPs. Some of his biggest hits include the songs "Do Rúk," "Domov," "Dokola," and "Prepáč."

Through the success of several singles, he gained the attention of a wider audience. This recognition led to collaborations with several Slovak artists and producers, such as Kali, Rytmus, Ego, Separ, Majk Spirit, Tina, Pil C, Celeste Buckingham, Dominika Mirgová, ADiss, Momo, or the band Moja Reč, as well as international artists like Raunii, IOVA and Serban Cazan.

In 2022, he released his debut album, Trueself, which achieved success in Slovakia. Album debuted at the top of the Slovak albums chart of the ČNS IFPI. In the same year, he won three awards at the Ruka Hore Awards and his debut took 2nd place in the Album of the Year category. Murin is actively involved in music engineering and production, while also writing his own song lyrics. He has worked on productions in Great Britain, the USA, the Czech Republic and Romania. He produced songs for Dominika Mirgová, for example.

His music videos on YouTube frequently rank among the top on the Slovak YouTube trending chart. The first to reach this peak was the music video for his single "Prepáč", which quickly climbed to the top within hours of its release and remained there for several weeks. He also topped the YouTube trending chart with the duet "Do Rúk" featuring Tina, despite the song not having an official music video at the time. Due to its popularity, a music video was later created, which remains his most-watched video on the platform, with over 7 million views. His hit "Raz Dva Tri" also achieved trending status as his third song on the Slovak YouTube chart. Murin's YouTube channel has more than 50 million views to date.

Murin is known for his distinctive interpretation, authenticity and directness. His musical style incorporates elements of pop, rock, hip-hop, and electronic music. He himself classifies his work as New Pop, which, however, is based on a long-standing affection for rap. Murin is known for his distinct sound, blending modern production with authentic lyrics that often explore themes of love and personal experience. In addition to a very specific sound quality, his asset is his musical education. After two years of intensive work in the Slovak music industry, he became one of the most active Slovak performers.

== Music career ==
=== 1998–2019: Early life and musical journey ===
Alan Murín was born and raised in Bratislava. He decided to pursue music professionally toward the end of high school. He acquired a microphone, taught himself to use music production software, and began creating lyrics and melodies, which he compiled into demo tracks. In 2017, he started releasing these songs on SoundCloud under the pseudonym 'Sane.

After high school, he enrolled at the University of Management in Bratislava but left after a year. His dedication to music led him to an offer to study abroad.He applied and was accepted to the Point Blank Music School in London, where he pursued sound engineering and music production.

=== 2019–2020: Early career and EP trilogy ===
While studying in London, Murin began building his music career in Slovakia. He started using his civil name as his artist's name. In June 2019, he founded the Trueself Records label and, a month later, signed a contract with Universal Music Slovakia. He made his debut in the music scene with a trio of genre-conceptual EPs (15 23, 23 10 and 19 98), which he released gradually as chapters. The titles of the EPs reflect the exact time, date, and year of his birth. Each of them contains three songs. Each EP contains three songs, all produced in collaboration with Scottish producer Charlie Leslie during Murin's time in London."

He released his debut EP called 15 23 in July 2019, which he considers the beginning of his musical career. The symbolism is even in the timing of the release itself, as it was officially released on July 23 at 3:23 p.m. (15:23 in 24-hour format). The EP can be primarily categorized as New Pop, but it features strong influences from hip-hop. It also includes tracks that blend various genres, such as pop, hip-hop, RnB, soul, DnB, dubstep, EDM, and rock. The debut single "Sám Sebou" released in July had a successful start. In August, he released the single "Vypínam". In the same year, the singer Tina approached him about collaboration, after she discovered one of his first hits "Vypínam", which received a significant response. Tina called it one of the most important songs on the Slovak music scene. Compared to many emerging artists in Slovakia, the debut project was well-received, with each song garnering tens of thousands of views on YouTube and streaming platforms.

In September, he followed up with a second EP, which centers on themes of love, life, and relationships. A music video for "Život" was released alongside the EP, capturing the beauty of life's simplicity.

Before the release of his third EP, on November 21, Murin performed live for the first time as the opening act for the Czech band Mirai at their concert in Bratislava.

In December 2019, he completed his debut trilogy with the final EP, 19 98.

In April 2020, ta music video for his breakthrough single "Vypínam" from the first EP was released. This track, which had gained the most attention from fans, reached over 500,000 streams, prompting the creation of the video. In May, the music video for the song "SR C", from the final EP of the trilogy, was also released.

Despite the success under Universal Music, through which he released three EPs, seven Slovak and two English singles, he still longed for artistic independence. In July 2020, he left Universal Music and started releasing under his own label.

Later in 2020, Murin released his first official single, "Telefonát".

=== 2021–2022: Album preparation and stay in the United States ===
At the beginning of 2022, Murin decided to explore his career options in the United States. There he collaborated with local rapper Raunii, resulting in the release of their single "AYAY". A month later, he followed up with ELEY, a reggaeton track and their second collaboration.

=== 2022–2023: Trueself album ===
The expected album was announced in August 2022 by the pilot single "Prepáč". The emotional track was well-received, trending on YouTube within hours of release and reaching the top of the Slovak charts, where it stayed for several weeks. It also ranked 5th in the ČNS IFPI Top 100 digital singles in Slovakia.

On August 26, 2022, he performed with his band at the Uprising Festival in Bratislava.

The album's pre-sale began on September 22, 2022, accompanied by the release of the second single, "Lifestyle". In October, he followed the reggaeton single "Raz Dva Tri", featuring Kali and produced by Peter Pann. The accompanying music video, starring model Viki Frajková, quickly climbed Slovak YouTube's trending charts and was also picked up by radio stations, ranking 26th in the ČNS IFPI Top 50 Slovak radio singles chart.

Trueself was physically released on CD on October 22, 2022, and digitally on November 4, under his label Trueself Records. The album includes 14 original songs and features collaborations with Slovak artists such as Rytmus, Separ, Ego, Kali, Celeste Buckingham and Tina. The album showcases a cohesive sonic style but also explores new musical directions. Following the album's release, he announced plans to release a music video for each track.

At the end of October, the single "Vamos Bombas" featuring Rytmus and produced by Call Me G, was released. The song was produced by Call Me G. In November, the music videos for the songs "Suave" and "1000 Básní" were released, the latter featuring Laris Diam. In December, the visual for the duet "Do Rúk" with Tina was released, achieving significant success and topping YouTube's trending charts, even without an accompanying music video. In 2023, the single was also released on CD.

In March 2023, he released "Cesta je cieľ", a collaboration with French producer and YouTuber Ysos. The collaboration arose after Ysos, searching for international artists for a joint project, discovered Murin through Spotify's TOP 50 artists in Slovakia.

The official album launch of Trueself took place on March 22, 2023 at the Nibble & sip house in the Zichy Palace in Bratislava.

In May, he appeared on two collaborations on Kali's album Banan in the songs "Srdce ako z kameňa" and "Kým ťa mám". In December, he featured on "Sóda", a dance track by Pokyman, the frontman of Medial Banana.

=== 2024: A new era of sound and EP Love Is Cool ===
In February 2024, he released his first international single "Still Love You", on which he collaborated with the Romanian singer Iova and the renowned Romanian producer Serban Cazan. The single received airplay on radio stations in Slovakia, the Czech Republic, Belgium, Canada, and Romania. His second single of the year, "Dokola", released in March 2024, marked a stylistic shift in his music production. According to the artist, the song represents a turning point in his career, as he began experimenting with new genres and placing greater emphasis on production.

In March 2024, he joined Kali and Peter Pann's Retrostar Tour as a guest artist. The tour was preceded by the release of their collaborative single, Mám ťa rád, which they performed together for the first time during the tour's opening stop in Bratislava.

The singles "Povedz Prečo", "Animal Style" and "Srdcom Buran" followed. His next EP Láska Je Cool was released in June 2024. In September, he released the latest single "Domov".

== Discography ==
=== Studio albums ===
- Trueself (2022)

=== EP ===
- 15 23 (2019)
- 23 10 (2019)
- 19 98 (2019)
- Láska Je Cool (2024)

== Filmography ==
=== Television ===
| Year | Program name | Performance | Production | Broadcast date | Archive |
|---|---|---|---|---|---|
| 2019 | 3 stages | "Vypínam" "Život"; Lady Gaga, Bradley Cooper – "Shallow" (with Lina Mayer) "More"; Michael Jackson – "Billie Jean" (with Lina Mayer, Billy Barman and Sľuk) | RTVS | November 9, 2019 | |
| 2022 | Milujem Slovensko (11th season, 7th episode – Muzikantský špeciál) | — | RTVS | February 25, 2022 | |
| 2022 | Ranné noviny | "SR C" | TV JOJ | June 17, 2022 | |
| 2022 | Teleráno | "Eley" | Markíza | April 28, 2022 | |
| 2024 | Neskoro večer: Talkshow Petra Marcina (20th season, 1st episode) | "Raz Dva Tri" "Caliente" | RTVS | January 13, 2024 | |
| 2024 | Teleráno | "Still Love You" | Markíza | March 11, 2024 | |
| 2024 | Teleráno | "Domov" | Markíza | September 6, 2024 | |

== Awards and nominations ==
| Award | Year | Nominee(s) | Category | Result | Ref. |
|---|---|---|---|---|---|
| Radio Head Awards | 2019 | Alan Murin | Discovery of the year | Nominated | |
| Ruka Hore Awards | 2021 | Alan Murin | Breakthrough Artist of the Year | Won | |
| Ruka Hore Awards | 2021 | "Kým ťa mám" (Kali feat. Alan Murin & Čis T) | Song of the year | # 19 | |
| Ruka Hore Awards | 2022 | Trueself | Album of the year | 2nd place | |
| Ruka Hore Awards | 2022 | "Prepáč" | Song of the year | 3rd place | |
| Ruka Hore Awards | 2022 | "Do rúk" (feat. Tina) | Collaboration of the year | 3rd place | |
| SOWA Social Awards Slovakia | 2023 | Alan Murin | Music | Nominated | |
| SOZA prices | 2023 | Alan Murin | The most successful young author | Nominated | |
