= Hungarian Slovak Gypsies =

Hungarian Slovak Gypsies can refer to:

- Hungarian Slovak Gypsies in the United States
- Romani people in Hungary
- Romani people in Slovakia
