= Pavol Čarnogurský =

Slovak politician (1908–1992)

Personal details
- Born: January 22, 1908 Malá Franková, Szepes County, Kingdom of Hungary
- Died: December 27, 1992 (aged 84) Bratislava, Czech and Slovak Federative Republic
- Children: Ján Čarnogurský, Olga Slivková
- Occupation: Politician, editor

Pavol Čarnogurský (22 January 1908 – 27 December 1992) was an influential Slovak People's Party politician in the Slovak State and afterwards an anti-communist dissident. He was a member of the Slovak parliament from 1939 to 1945, including when it passed antisemitic legislation. Čarnogurský said that he abstained from the vote on Decree 68/1942, which legalized the deportation of Jews from Slovakia. His son, Ján Čarnogurský, became prime minister briefly after the dissolution of Czechoslovakia.
