= Martin Slivka =

Slovak documentary filmmaker (1929–2002)

Martin Slivka (1 November 1929 in Spišský Štiavnik – 23 September 2002 in Bratislava) was a Slovak documentary filmmaker, director, screenwriter and ethnographer. He is best remembered for his documentaries Metamorfóza vlákna (1968), Človek a hra (1968), Deti a hudba (1969), Fašiangy (1969), and Ľudová kultúra na Slovensku (1972). He was married to journalist Olga Slivková.
