= Spišský Štiavnik =

- Municipality
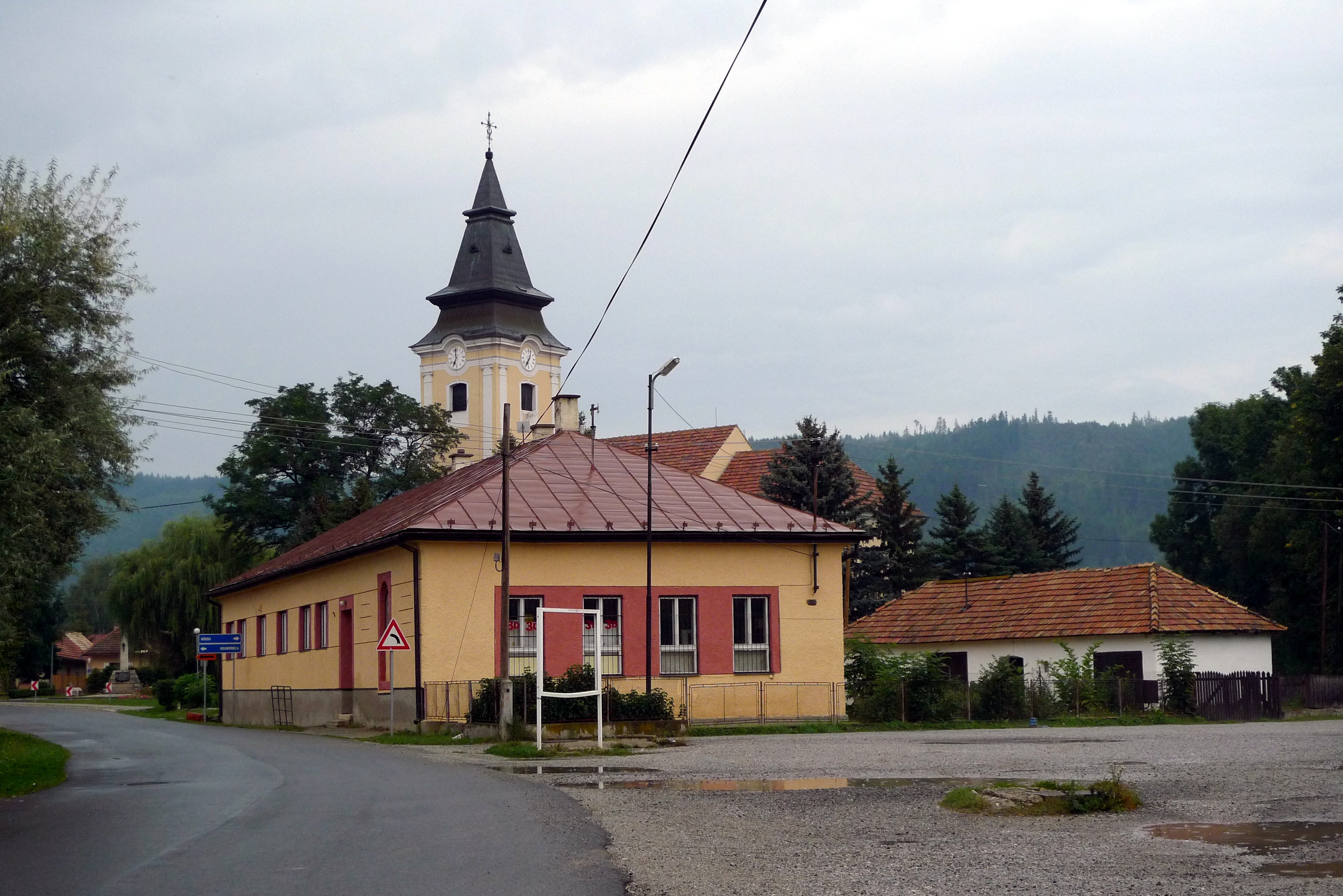

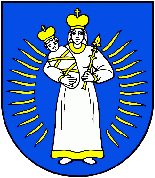
- Flag Coat of arms

- Location of Spišský Štiavnik in the Prešov Region Location of Spišský Štiavnik in Slovakia
- Coordinates: 48.99°N 20.36°E
- Country: Slovakia
- Region: Prešov Region
- District: Poprad District
- First mentioned: 1246

Area
  - Total: 18.36 km^{2} (7.09 sq mi)
- Elevation: 563 m (1,847 ft)

Population (2025)
  - Total: 2,871
- Time zone: UTC+1 (CET)
  - Summer (DST): UTC+2 (CEST)
- Postal code: 591 4
- Area code: +421 52
- Vehicle registration plate (until 2022): PP
- Website: www.spisskystiavnik.sk

Spišský Štiavnik (Hungarian: Savnik, German: Schawnik or Schafing) is a village and municipality in Poprad District in the Prešov Region of northern Slovakia.

== Geography ==
The municipality lies at an altitude of 563 metres (1,847 ft) and covers an area of 18.36 km^{2} (7.09 sq mi) (2025).

== History ==
In historical records the village was first mentioned in 1246.

== Population ==
Population statistic (10 years)
Year	1995	2005	2015	2025
Count	1878	2164	2778	2871
Difference		+15.22%	+28.37%	+3.34%

Population statistic
Year	2024	2025
Count	2826	2871
Difference		+1.59%

It has a population of 2871 people (31 December 2025).

=== Ethnicity ===
Census 2021 (1+ %)
Ethnicity	Number	Fraction
Slovak	2380	88.21%
Not found out	320	11.86%
Romani	66	2.44%
Total	2698	

In year 2021 was 2698 people by ethnicity 2380 as Slovak, 320 as Not found out, 66 as Romani, 6 as Czech, 3 as Russian, 2 as Rusyn, 2 as Polish, 1 as Vietnamese, 1 as Austrian, 1 as German and 1 as Other.

Note on population: The difference values of population numbers in the table "Population statistic" and in the sections "Ethnicity" & "Religion" is caused by the use of various statistical methods.

=== Religion ===
Census 2021 (1+ %)
Religion	Number	Fraction
Roman Catholic Church	2172	80.5%
Not found out	302	11.19%
None	162	6%
Total	2698	

In year 2021 was 2698 people by religion 2172 from Roman Catholic Church, 302 from Not found out, 162 from None, 22 from Greek Catholic Church, 10 from Evangelical Church, 8 from Christian Congregations in Slovakia, 4 from Eastern Orthodox Church, 4 from Ad hoc movements, 3 from Apostolic Church, 2 from Calvinist Church, 2 from Other and not ascertained christian church, 2 from Other, 1 from Old Catholic Church, 1 from Paganism and natural spirituality, 1 from Islam, 1 from Czechoslovak Hussite Church and 1 from Buddhism.

== Famous people ==
- Tibor Frešo, composer and conductor
- Prof. Martin Slivka, ethnography director

== Infrastructure and economy ==
Cultural sightseeing is a building of former spas from the 19th century. In the Spišský Štiavnik is multi course as well as football and horse racing clubs.
