= Slzy a úsmevy, Op.25 =

1909 song cycle by Mikuláš Schneider-Trnavský

Slzy a úsmevy, Op.25 (Tears and Smiles) is a 1909 song cycle on Slovak poetry by Slovak composer Mikuláš Schneider-Trnavský. It is among his best known vocal compositions. The songs were first published in 1912.

== Songs ==
- 1. Prsteň ("A ring") to a text by Janko Jesenský
- 2. Pieseň ("A song") Ivan Krasko
- 3. Vesper Dominicae - Ivan Krasko
- 4. Letí Havran, Letí ("Fly crow, fly") Svetozár Hurban Vajanský
- 5. Nôžka ("The little leg") Svetozár Hurban Vajanský
- 6. Uspávanka ("Lullaby") from the publication Nový Nápev Na Prostonárodné Slová
- 7. Keď Na Deň Zvoniť Mali ("When in the morning rings the bell") Ivan Krasko
- 8. Magdaléna - Vladimír Roy

== Recordings ==
- Štefan Margita, 2006
