= Edmund Pascha =

Edmund Pascha (1714 – 6 May 1772) was a preacher, organist and composer. He used the pen name Claudianus Ostern.

== Life ==
Edmund Pascha was born in 1714 in Kroměříž, the Moravian musical centre of that time. Aged 17, he entered the Franciscan monastery at Hlohovec (western Slovakia). He studied philosophy at Beckov (western Slovakia) and theology at Uherské Hradiště (eastern Moravia). In addition to his native language he also managed Latin, German, Italian and some Hungarian. He practised music and preaching in several Franciscan monasteries of the order’s Salvatorian province, notably at Prešov (eastern Slovakia) and lastly at Žilina (northwestern Slovakia), where he died on 6 May 1772, following many years of painful illness.

== Works ==
Pascha's compositions of Slovak passionals, pastoral masses and Christmas carols exemplify Slovak Baroque music and reference Slovak literature. In his musical textbooks, he highlighted Christmas folklore and Slovak folk songs with Christmas and Easter themes.

His musical works include a few textbooks in manuscript. The so-called Žilinský kancionál (ca. 1770) contained two manuscript textbooks. The first was Harmonia pastoralis (Pastierska harmónia), a Latin Slovak Christmas mass in Slovak, exclusively folk pastorela and carols, and also a Latin antiphony Tota pulchra (Celá krásna). The second, titled Prosae pastorales (Pastierske spevy), contained 25 carols for Christmas and New Year. Among them is the carol Do hory, do lesa, valasi.

The best known of Pascha's works is Vianočná omša F-dur (Christmas mass in F Major) from the Harmonia Pastoralis. It is a unique work of Slovak Baroque music. It reflects elements of Slovak folk music and shepherd songs. It is notable for its challenging organ interludes, solo duets and vocal trios, intermixed with a cappella choral parts. It features parts for clarinets, flutes and shepherds' tubas (tuba pastoralis). Music historian Terray maintains that his Christmas mass is unparalleled for its charm, originality, and power. Vjda in 1969 called it a "jewel of [the] musical past".

Preserved in manuscript form are his three passions, Prešovský (1770), Pruštiansky (1771), and Žilinský (1771), which contain responsive parts for four voices, in Slovak. The manuscripts are illustrated by the author. The words are made up of simple meditations from Baroque poetry. Baroque folk music from carols and pastorales combine with elements of other folk musical expressions and shepherd songs. He developed folk elements in melodic, rhythmic, and harmonic structure and also in organ parts. However, his solos and duets have their origin in Baroque, almost reflecting the work of Johann Sebastian Bach. It is possible to find in it elements of earlier Classicist music.

Unsubstantiated speculation asserts that Pascha was not the author of these works, but that they were composed by another Franciscan organist, composer and copyist, Jozef Juraj Zrunek (1736–1789).

== Bibliography ==
- Harmónia Pastoralis – Prosae pastorales. Notated Latin Slovak manuscript with two parts made out in 1770 in Žilina;
- Prešovský pašionál. Notated Slovak manuscript from 1770;
- Prušiansky pašionál. Notated Slovak manuscript from 1771;
- Žilinský pašionál. Notated Slovak manuscript from 1771 in Žilina.

Listed music except Prušiansky pašionál is stored in Literárny archív Matice slovenskej in Martin. Prušiansky is stored in Štátny archív v Bytči.
