= Olga Slivková =

Slovak journalist (1936–2024)

- Born: Olga Čarnogurská; 9 September 1936
- Died: 23 April 2024 (aged 87)
- Occupation: Journalist
- Spouse: Martin Slivka

Olga Slivková (née Čarnogurská; 9 September 1936 – 23 April 2024) was a Slovak journalist.

== Biography ==
Her father Pavol Čarnogurský was a politician in the Slovak Republic under Nazi rule.

In her early career she worked as a teacher, translator and Germanist, author of pedagogical literature and textbooks. She was a co-author of the textbook German for primary schools, published by the Slovak Pedagogical Institute.

During her career, she prepared radio contributions mainly for the youth and education editorial departments and the literary and music editorial department, from the 1960s to the 1980s, as reported by RTVS. Slivková was the editor of the Czechoslovak Radio in Bratislava.

Slivková co-founded the renewed Scout Guild in Slovakia after 1989 and was involved in the Slovak Catholic Charity. Like her husband, Martin Slivka, she was known as a promoter of Slovak folklore. She was a Roman Catholic.
