= Music of Slovakia =

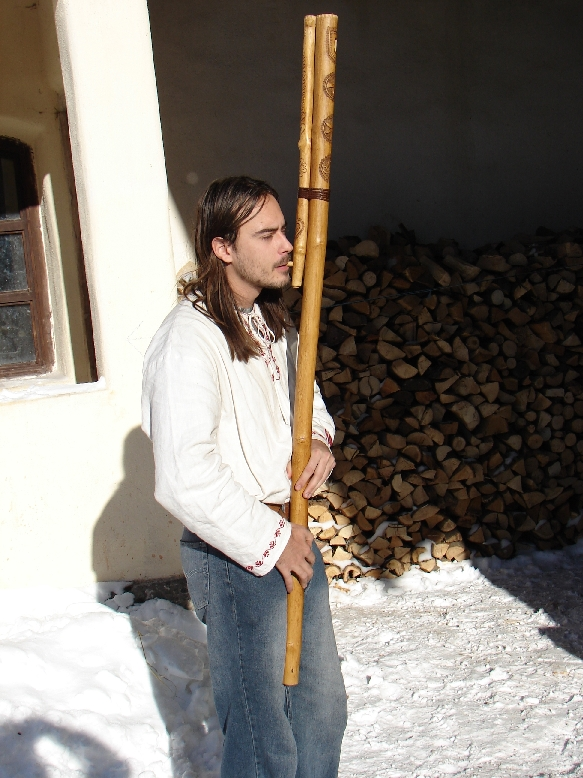
The fujara, a traditional Slovak shepherd's pipe

The music of Slovakia has been influenced both by the country's native Slovak peoples and the music of neighbouring regions. Whilst there are traces of pre-historic musical instruments, the country has a rich heritage of folk music and mediaeval liturgical music, and from the 18th century onwards, in particular, musical life was influenced by that of Austria-Hungary. In the 19th century, composers such as Ján Levoslav Bella began to write romantic music with a Slovak character. In the twentieth century, there were a number of composers who identified with Slovak culture. After the fall of communism in 1989–90 the country also began to develop its own popular music scene in Western style.

== History of music in Slovakia ==
The term Slovak music is slightly confusing; many peoples lived over the ages in the territory now represented by the state of Slovakia, and the history of the region's music is therefore not merely the history of the music of the Slovaks

Ejlucka, Luckasiroka, traditional Slovak song.

=== Earliest times ===
Bone pipes dating from the Early Bronze Age (about 3000 BC) have been found in the Nitra region, testifying to the early role of music in the Celtic 'Nitra Culture'. Such instruments were produced continuously, albeit with more sophistication, up to the mediaeval period. Other early instruments found include drums dating back to the Palaeolithic period, iron and bronze bells from the 3rd or 4th century AD. Other folk instruments of the region whose early development must remain largely conjectural include the fujara and the Slovak versions of bagpipes and the jaw harp. They certainly existed in the 15th century.

=== The medieval period ===
From the medieval period onwards writers identify a number of principal streams of music in Slovakia. The principal classifications include church music, folk music, and instrumental music heard in towns and courts. Each of these has of course numerous subsidiary classifications.

Some of the oldest recorded forms of music in Slovakia are liturgical song (in Old Slavonic) from the time of Great Moravian empire (9th century), from which developed much of the sacred music of later centuries. Latin plainsong was also widespread in the region at this early period. Early codices include the 'Nitra Gospels' of c. 1100, and the 'Pray codex' (c. 1195). From the 15th to the 17th centuries, polyphony was practised and developed at many urban centres, including Bratislava, Bardejov, Levoča and Kežmarok.

In 1526 when parts of Kingdom of Hungary was ruled by Habsburg kings, Pozsony (now Bratislava) became a coronation city, and this was to greatly influence the development of formal music in the country's towns. In the countryside, folk music developed in a more insular manner in the country's various regions.

=== Seventeenth and eighteenth centuries ===
As elsewhere in Europe, the Church and the aristocracy became the main patrons of formal music during this period. Church composers were active throughout the country; e.g., in the polyphonic tradition, Andreas Neoman who worked at Bardejov and elsewhere in the early 17th century, Ján Šimbracký (d. 1657), organist at the Protestant church in Spišské Podhradie, and Samuel Marckfelner (1621–1674), organist at Levoča. In the larger towns, especially in Bratislava, the influence of the Italian concertante style was felt, composers in this vein including Samuel Capricornus (1628–1665) (who eventually became kapellmeister for a prince of Stuttgart), his successor at the Protestant church in Breatislava, Johann Sigismund Kusser (1626–1696).

By the eighteenth century, Catholic musicians began to take the musical lead over their Protestant colleagues. A highly rated composer was František Xaver Budinský (1676–1727), who appears to have been a Jesuit lay brother and worked in Trnava, Prešov, Košice, Trenčín, and elsewhere in Slovakia. His compositions include three symphonies, the earliest known to have been written in Slovakia.

=== Nineteenth century ===
In the first half of the 19th century, a national musical tradition began to develop around Slovakia’s impressive folk heritage. Modern Slovak music drew from both classical and folk styles. A key figure who began this fusion is Ján Levoslav Bella, born in Liptovský Mikuláš (1843–1936), a contemporary of Antonín Dvořák and Leoš Janáček. Slovak modes and melodies can be heard clearly in his third string quartet, as well as in many of his other works. He also wrote the first opera to be performed in Slovak, Kováč Wieland (Wieland the Smith), written in German in 1880-1890, but premiered in Slovak in Bratislava in 1926.

=== Modern times ===
Well-known works from the 20th century include the compositions of Eugen Suchoň, Alexander Moyzes, Alexander Albrecht and the operas of Ján Cikker. The internationally most acknowledged composers of the 21st century are Vladimír Godár, Peter Breiner, Peter Machajdík and Iris Szeghy. Operatic soprano Lucia Popp was born in Záhorská Ves.

== Musical ensembles and festivals ==
Amongst the most significant contemporary orchestral ensembles are the Slovak Philharmonic Orchestra of Bratislava, the State Philharmonic Orchestra of Kosice, the Slovak Radio Symphony Orchestra, the Slovak Chamber Orchestra (known as the Warchalovci after their founder Bohdan Warchal), and the chamber orchestra Capella Istropolitana. There are opera companies in Bratislava, Košice and Banská Bystrica. Music festivals include the annual Bratislava Music Festival (Bratislavské hudobné slávnosti), Indian Summer in Levoča (Levočské babie leto), Festival of Piešťany (Piešťanský festival), one of longest established festivals, dating from 1955, the Konvergencie Chamber Music Festival founded in 1999 by cellist, Jozef Lupták, Music at Fulla (Hudba u Fullu) in Ružomberok founded 2009 by composer Peter Machajdik, and many others.

== See also ==
- List of Slovak composers
- Slovak folk music
- Slovak popular music
- The 100 Greatest Slovak Albums of All Time
