= Císař =

Císař (feminine: Císařová) is a Czech surname meaning 'emperor'. The surname was created based on the appearance or behaviour of its bearer. The oldest mention of the surname is from 1519. An Anglicised and Germanised form of the surname is Cisar. Notable people with the surname include:

- Čestmír Císař (1920–2013), Czech politician and diplomat
- Josef Císař (1916–?), Czech ski jumper
