= Ivan Hrušovský =

Slovak composer and educator

Ivan Hrušovský (23 February 1927 – 5 October 2001) was a Slovak composer and educator.

Hrušovský was born in Bratislava, Slovakia (Czechoslovakia at the time). There, he studied musicology, philosophy, and aesthetics at Comenius University (1947 – 1952). He also studied composition at the Bratislava Conservatory (1947 – 1952) and the Academy of Performing Arts in Bratislava (1952 – 1957), at both institutions with Alexander Moyzes.

Hrušovský wrote a broad variety of musical compositions. He also wrote scientific articles about Slovak music and music education.
