= Patrik Sailer =

Slovak footballer

Personal information
- Full name: Patrik Sailer
- Date of birth: 28 June 1989 (age 37)
- Place of birth: Czechoslovakia
- Position: Centre back

Team information
- Current team: TJ Slovan Nitra-Chrenová

Youth career
- Nitra

Senior career*
Years	Team	Apps	(Gls)
2008–2011	Nitra	10	(0)
2011–2012	Piešťany		
2013-2026	TJ Slovan Nitra-Chrenová		
- * Club domestic league appearances and goals as of 6 April 2012

Patrik Sailer (born 28 June 1989) is a Slovak football defender who played for FC Nitra, PFK Piešťany and TJ Slovan Nitra-Chrenová.
