= Vladimír Valach =

Slovak diplomat and economist (1937–2006)

- Born: 26 April 1937; Tekovské Nemce, Czechoslovakia
- Died: 5 March 2006 (aged 68); Bratislava, Slovakia
- Occupations: Diplomat; Economist; Writer

Vladimír Valach (26 April 1937 – 5 March 2006) was a Slovak diplomat, economist and writer. He significantly contributed to the development of Slovak banking sector and French-Slovak relations.

== Biography ==
Vladimír Valach was born on 26 April 1937 in Tekovské Nemce, Czechoslovakia. He studied at the University of Economics in Prague (1955 to 1960). Between 1968 and 1976 he worked as a branch manager of the commercial banking arm of the State Bank of Czechoslovakia in Bratislava. Subsequently he held the post of a deputy general director of the State Bank. In 1990, Valach capitalized on his experience in the field of banking and monetary policy, when he was named the first vice-governor of the new issuing bank of the State Bank of Czechoslovakia in Prague. He contributed to the transition process of the Czechoslovak koruna to a currency with internal and later external convertibility (3 devaluations of koruna at the beginning of the 1990s), as well as during the separation of currencies after the break-up of the federation and the subsequent creation of Slovak koruna.

In the 1990s he was involved in the creation of the Slovak Guarantee Bank as a first bank of its kind in the ČSFR. He also participated in the creation of Credit Lyonnais Bank Slovakia, became its general manager and at the same time the president of its Board of Trustees. Vladimír Valach was a founding president of the French-Slovak Chamber of Commerce and was able to utilize his positive relation with France in 1997, when he was made the Slovak ambassador in Paris. He served as the ambassador until 2001, when he was replaced by Mária Krasnohorská. For his work and contribution to the development of Slovak-French relations he was awarded the title of the Knight of Légion d'honneur of the French Republic. In Slovakia he continued working towards the development of the country's banking sector and at the beginning of the 21st century Valach held the position of the Director of the Slovak Bank Association, which contributed to his position as an expert on Slovak economy. At the same time he dedicated his time to lecturing on diplomacy at the School of International Relations of the University of Economics in Bratislava and literary work.

Vladimír Valach died on 5 March 2006 in Bratislava.

== Works ==
Professional publications

- Nové dimenzie rizík na zahraničných trhoch a devízová návratnosť (New dimensions of risks in foreign markets and return of foreign exchange), 1981
- Riziká na zahraničných trhoch a devízová návratnosť (Risks in foreign markets and return of foreign exchange), 1986
- Adaptácia - kritérium úspešnosti ekonomiky (Adaptation - a criterion for the success of economy), 1990
- Medzinárodné hospodárske vzťahy v kapitalizme (International economic relations in capitalism), 1986 (co-author)
- Medzinárodný platobný styk a menové vzťahy (International payment and monetary relations), 1997 (co-author)

Other

- Paris - Bratislava, alebo, Prečo mám rád Francúzsko? (Paris - Bratislava, or why I like France), 2002
- Paris - Bratislava, ou, Pourquoi j'aime la France? (Paris - Bratislava, or why I like France), 2005
