= Peter Jakubech =

Slovak footballer

Personal information
- Date of birth: 22 June 1971 (age 55)
- Position: Goalkeeper

Senior career*
Years	Team	Apps	(Gls)
1989–1990	ZVL Považská Bystrica		
1990–1991	SKP Union Cheb		
1991–1997	1. FC Tatran Prešov		
1997	FC Spartak Trnava		
1997–1998	MŠK Žilina		
1998–1999	MFK Ružomberok		
1999–2000	Dukla Pribram		
2000	České Budějovice		
2001	BSC JAS Bardejov		
2001–2004	FC Steel Trans Ličartovce		
- * Club domestic league appearances and goals

Peter Jakubech (born 22 June 1971) is a retired Slovak football goalkeeper.
