= Marián Timm =

Slovak footballer

Personal information
- Full name: Marián Timm
- Date of birth: 7 January 1990 (age 36)
- Place of birth: Nová Baňa, Czechoslovakia
- Height: 1.81 m (5 ft 11 1/2 in)
- Position: Striker

Team information
- Current team: ŠK SFM Senec
- Number: 9

Youth career
- 1996–2003: Slovan Bratislava
- 2003–2008: Inter Bratislava

Senior career*
Years	Team	Apps	(Gls)
2009–2011	Dynamo České Budějovice	7	(0)
2011	Zenit Čáslav	8	(0)
2012–	→SFM Senec (loan)	9	(0)
- * Club domestic league appearances and goals as of 30 May 2012

Marián Timm (born 7 January 1990 in Nová Baňa) is a Slovak football striker who currently plays for the Slovak 2. liga club ŠK SFM Senec. He previously played for SK Dynamo České Budějovice.
