= Sui Vesan =

Sui Vesan is a Slovak folk singer, instrumentalist, poet and composer. Vesan is from a small village in Czechoslovakia, where she became well-grounded in the area's folk music. At age 14, she took a trip to Syria with her father, where she was exposed to the music of the Middle East, as well as Western pop music, both of which influenced her music greatly. Vesanʻs music sparked some political controversy, leading to career difficulties. She left music for a time to raise her children, returning in 2001 with her move to the Slovak capital, Bratislava, and subsequent recording projects. Vesan often plays the kalimba, an African thumb piano, and flutes. Her husband often accompanies her on percussion instruments.
