= Ján Móry =

Slovak composer and pedagogue (1892–1978)

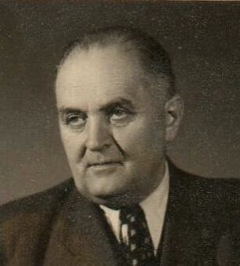

Ján Móry (or Johann Mory) (10 July 1892 – 5 May 1978) was a Slovak composer and pedagogue also known under pseudonym H. Tschirmer.

== Life ==
Móry was born in Banská Bystrica (Besztercebánya). From 1902 to 1910 he studied at gymnasium in Banská Bystrica, in the years 1910 - 1912, he studied at the University of Trading in Budapest. He studied piano with Scheinberger in Banská Bystrica, composition with Dobó in Budapest and from 1921 to 1925 with Herman Büchel in Berlin. Until 1921, he led the family business in Banská Bystrica which he sold to his siblings Klimos. The longest post he had was as an owner of the hotel in Štrbské Pleso. From 1947 to 1960, he was a director of Musical school in Spišská Nová Ves and finally he lived in Bratislava, where he died.

== Music ==
He was mostly known for his songs, operettas (Slnečná vdova, Pre teba všetko) and other stage works.

He gained incentives for the musical theory and experience from Viliam Figuš-Bystrý, with whom he met in Banská Bystrica and in Vysoké Tatry. He became known figure in the Slovak musical life as a creator of music entertainment in 1920s and 1930s. His songs, operettas, singspiels were played in addition to Slovakia and Czech republic also in Germany. Most of his operettas are in the nature of salon conversational plays where are applied typical Móry songs and duets, dances and overtures. He is the author of many scenic works, chamber and orchestral compositions.

In Banská Bystrica, he founded the sports club BAC with a strong football team. His succession is deposited in the Literary and music museum in Banská Bystrica.
