= Majself =

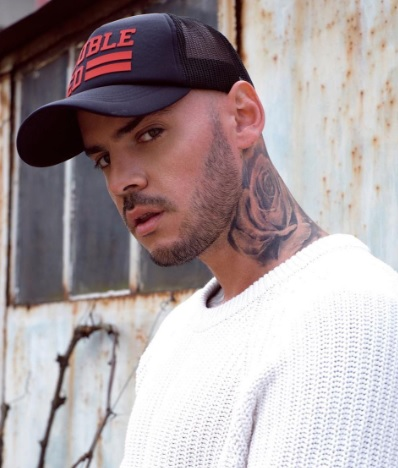

Background information
- Born: Michal Švehla; 7 February 1987 (age 38); Bratislava, Czechoslovakia
- Origin: Slovakia
- Occupations: Singer; Rapper
- Years active: 2002—present
- Labels: Neptune Clan
- Spouse: Júlia Švehlová

Michal Švehla (born 7 February 1987), known as Majself, is a Slovak rapper and musician. He was born in Bratislava, Czechoslovakia.

== Career ==
Majself won the Vytiahni sov majk television competition of Musiq1 in 2010. In 2012, he released his first mixtape "Číslo 7 žije" which featured Separ, Plexo, Rasco, and Wuty.

Majself released the studio album Eden in 2015, which inspired by the artist's life, when his childhood friend fell into hard drugs at a young age, had a car accident and ended up in a rehabilitation center. However, she recovered and her story is featured as an inspiration for people not to give up.

In May 2016, Majself collaborated with Grizzly and released the album Neptun. It contains seven songs including collaborations with Kali; "Iný", on which Plexo also participated, or "What do you want more" with Kali and Separ.

After a two-year hiatus, Majself released his first multi-genre album, Romeo and Juliet, which centers on his relationship with his wife Júlia.

In 2023, Majself incorporated this influence into the song "Vibe", with a video shot in Prague under the baton of Czech director Randy Cold. The song "Na dne" was created in collaboration with rapper Kali and Czech musician Refew. The video was created under the supervision of the young Czech director Nikita Rublev.

== Personal life ==
Majself has been fighting Crohn's disease since 2018 and is trying to raise awareness about this disease. He was one of the ambassadors of the Slovak Crohn Club. He regularly participates in charity events. Majself is married to Júlia Švehlová and they have one son.

In 2022, Majself was accused for illegal use of marijuana.

== Discography ==
=== Singles ===
#	Title	Year	Peak chart positions
1	"Talizman" (feat. Ben Cristovao)	2017	—
2	"Vlny"	2017	77
3	"Mám to rád"	2019	–
4	"Raj" (feat. Dominika Mirgová)	2020	96
5	"Posledný tanec"	2019	—
6	"Romeo a Júlia"	2020	87
7	"Kométa (pre Gumpa)" (feat. Desmod)	2020	10
8	"Úsmev" (feat. Dominika Mirgová)	2020	—
