= Mária Krasnohorská =

Mária Krásnohorská
- Born: Mária Frištáková; August 15, 1949 (age 77); Tovarníky, Czechoslovakia
- Occupation: Diplomat

Mária Krásnohorská (née Frištáková, born 15 August 1949) is a Slovak diplomat, who served as the ambassador of Slovakia to France (2001–2007) and Italy (2011-2015). She also served as the permanent delegate to UNESCO . In this position, she oversaw the inclusion of a traditional Slovak Shepard's flute Fujara on the UNESCO Representative List of the Intangible Cultural Heritage of Humanity.

Krásnohorská was awarded a Medal for her Contributions to the Slovak diplomacy by the foreign minister Ivan Korčok in 2021. She was also named Officer of the French Legion of Honour.
