= Jozef Gábriš =

Czechoslovak controlline aerobatics pilot (1933–1994)

Jozef Gábriš (25 June 1933 – 1994) was a controlline aerobatics pilot (F2B) from the former Czechoslovakia. In 1958, he won his first international championship during the ninth Criterium of Europe, in Belgium (his first international contest in this class). Eight years later, on the RAF Airbase in Swinderby he reached his first WCH title, followed by third in 1968 in Helsinki (Finland). The fourth WCH title he lost just by a "thumb", in 1972.

1971 he won the European Champion's title in Hungarian town Pécs, followed after 2nd place on the European Championship in Genk (Belgium) 1969.

His most popular and nearly legendary construction was the F2B model Super Master. Powered by the MVVS 5,6A.
