= Marek Brezovský =

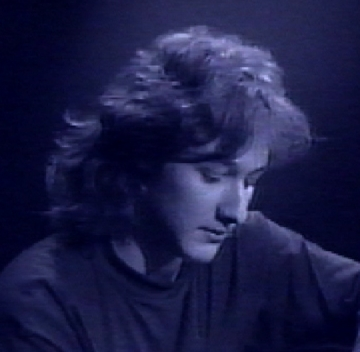
Marek Brezovský in 1991

Marek Brezovský (April 15, 1974, Bratislava, Czechoslovakia – June 22, 1994, Bratislava, Slovakia) was a Slovak music composer, songwriter, piano player and singer. He studied at the Academy of Performing Arts, Bratislava, Slovakia, and is deemed one of the most influential modern Slovak composers. He died of heroin overdose at the age of 20.

== Life and career ==
Marek Brezovský was the son of Ali Brezovský, a well-known Slovak music composer. He started taking piano lessons at the age of 5 and later studied composition at the Bratislava Music School (Konzervatórium). From 1993, he continued his composition studies at the Bratislava Academy of Performing Arts up until his untimely death in 1994.

Music was the essence of Brezovský's life. During his studies at the Music School, he founded Súbor súčasnej hudby (The Contemporary Music Ensemble) where he was engaged as both a composer and a piano player. The Contemporary Music Ensemble performed Brezovský's classical music pieces (Miniatúra pre sláčikový orchester – Miniature for String Orchestra, Venované nešťastiu – Dedicated to Sorrow and many more). He also founded the Art-M Trio, an art rock band (Marek Brezovský – keyboards, vocals; Marek Minárik – bass guitar; Michal Kresťanko – drums). The band's live performances accrued plaudits from both critics and audiences. It was then that Brezovský made his first studio recordings. Many songs and pieces from this period later appeared on albums (Hrana – The Edge, 1999) and (Komorná Hudba – Chamber Music, 2004). Brezovský was also a member of a punk rock group, Avanavany.

Brezovský composed a soundtrack to the musical film, Muzikál (produced by the Slovak Television). In 1994, he wrote scores for the Pressburger Blut performance (a play staged by the GUnaGU Theater). His music was also used in Chekhov's The Seagull (Čajka – performed by the Nitra Theater, Slovakia). In 2000, the performance received the Dosky Award (The Slovak Theatre Awards) for best score. His classical music compositions are performed at numerous classical music festivals.

In 1999, Brezovský's close friend, Oskar Rózsa, put together a band to produce and record the album Hrana (The Edge) with Brezovský's compositions. The album contains 14 original tracks, 2 of which are re-mastered versions of rare recordings Brezovský had performed at the age of 17. The album has since become legendary and is considered one of the masterpieces of the Slovak music scene. In 2011, Oskar Rózsa et al. commenced the "Hrana Tour" (The Edge Tour). Live performances introduced all tracks from the original CD as well as several thus far unknown compositions from Brezovský's legacy. The tour was very successful.

In 2014, Slovak director Patrik Lančarič released Hrana: 4 filmy o Marekovi Brezovskom (The Edge: 4 Films About Marek Brezovský), a documentary on Brezovský's life and work. In the near future, a new CD with Brezovský's unreleased tracks is expected to be produced. Brezovský's legacy – consisting of CDs with his abundant music ideas – is being managed by his family.

== Compositions ==
- Voľnosť for flute, cello and piano (1989?)
- Miniatúra quasi burlesca for piano (1989?)
- Jad nesceš, nemosáš, alebo chot na masáž for piano and chamber orchestra (1990)
- Venované nešťastiu for chamber orchestra (1990)
- Taká malá nálada for violin and piano (1990?)
- Romanca for viola and piano (1991)
- Miniatúra for string orchestra (1991)
- Piano Sonata No.1 „Cesta“ (1992)
- Piano Sonata No.2 „Túžba“ (1993)
- Minikoncertík for saxophone and chamber orchestra (1994)

== Discography ==
- Venované nešťastiu (memorial concert recorded on 02.02.1995 in the Studio 2 of the Slovak Radio)
- Hrana (The Edge) (1999)
- Komorná hudba] (Chamber Music) (Hudobný Fond 2004, including previous recordings from the 1995 memorial concert)
- Rebelie III. Neopunk (1992) – a compilation album with 4 songs performed by the Avanavany group.
- Hrana Live 2012 (2012)
