= Palo Macho =

Slovak painter (born 1965)

Palo Macho (born 22 September 1965, in Streženice) is a Slovak painter specializing in the work with glass - creating glass panes, glass graphics, glass reliefs and other glass objects.

== Education ==
- 1980-1983: Secondary School of Glasspainting, Nový Bor, Czech Republic
- 1983-1986: Secondary School of Art Glass, Kamenický Šenov, Czech Republic
- 1989-1995: Academy of Fine Art, Bratislava, Slovakia
- 1993: École de Beaux-Arts, Saint-Étienne, France
- 1997: Cité International des Arts, Paris, France

== Selection of exhibitions ==
- 1996 - Via Lucis, Chateau Musée, Boulogne-sur-Mer, France
- 1997 - Galerie Art et Creation, Lyon, France
- 1999 - Steninge World Exhibition of Art Glass, Märsta, Sweden
- 2001 - Glasgalerie Linz, Linz, Austria
- 2003 - Forms and Faces, Budapest, Hungary - solo exhibition
- 2003 - Art Glass Society Conference, Global Art Venue, Seattle, United States
- 2004 - Fragmenty (z Fullu), Slovak National Gallery, Bratislava, Slovakia - solo exhibition ()
- 2005 - Bienale, Märsta, Sweden
- 2006 - Coburg Glass Prize, Coburg, Germany
- 2007 - Art Glass, Riihimäki-Museum of glass, Helsinki, Finland
- 2007 - In extenso, Oravská galéria, Dolný Kubín, Slovakia - solo exhibition...

== Personal life ==
From 1994 to 1998 Palo Macho taught at The Secondary School of Fine Arts in Lednické Rovne.

Besides his work with glass, Palo Macho has also published two collections of poetry, Strelné modlitby (Firing Prayers) in 1995 and Mesiac na červeno (Moon in Red) in 2006.
