= Mikuláš Schneider-Trnavský =

Slovak composer, conductor and pedagogue

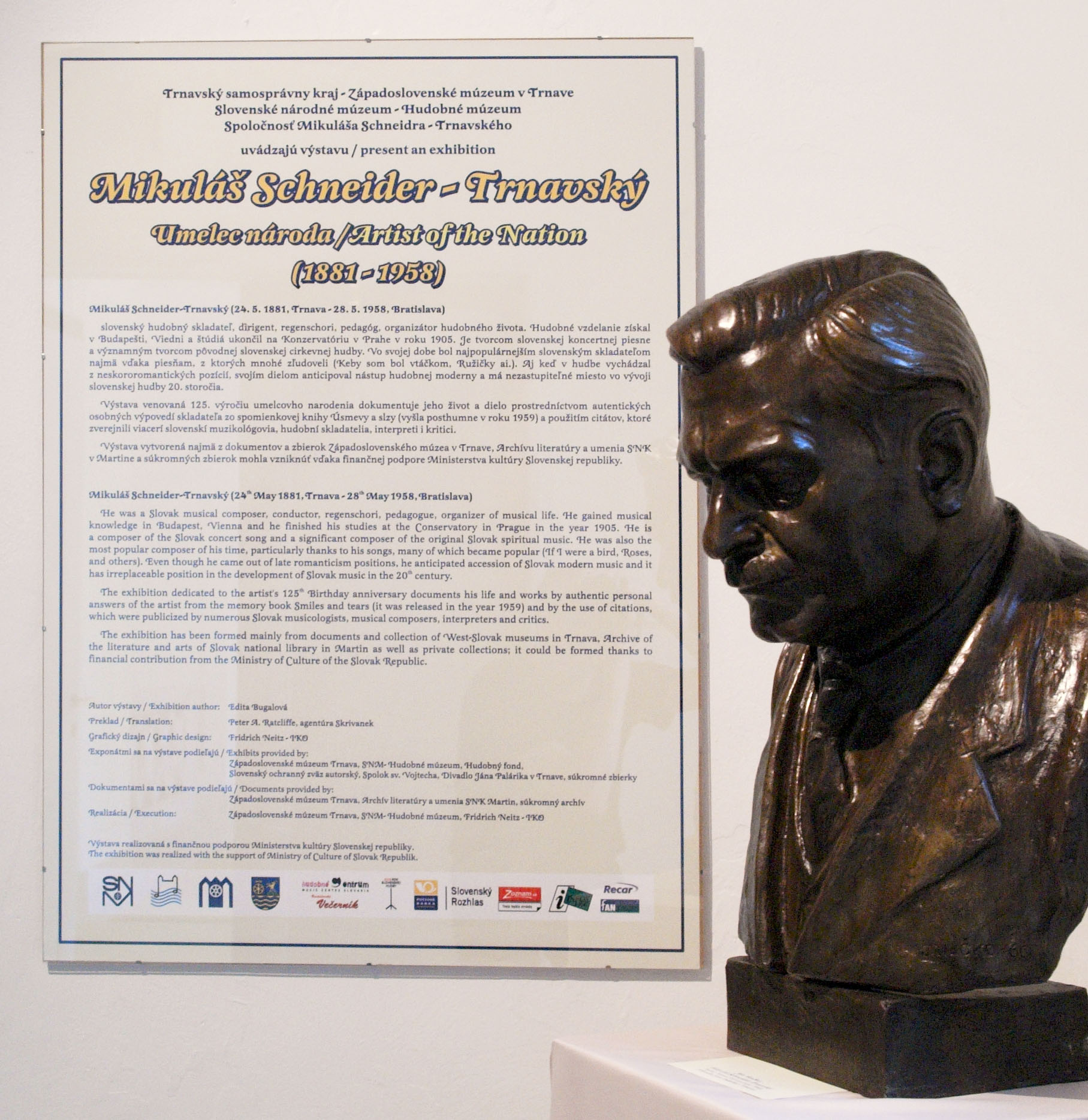
Bronze bust of M. Schneider-Trnavský at Bratislava Castle.

Mikuláš Schneider-Trnavský KSG (24 May 1881, Trnava – 28 May 1958, Bratislava) was a Slovak composer, conductor and pedagogue. He was popular mostly because of his songs, some becoming traditional.

== Life ==
In 1900, he passed his maturita exam in Trnava. From 1900 to 1901, he studied composition at the Budapestian conservatory with Hans von Koessler. From 1901 to 1903, he studied at the conservatory in Vienna with Hermann Graedener. Finally, from 1903 to 1905, he studied organ playing in Prague with Josef Klička and composition with Carl Stecker.

After his studies, he became regenschori in Zrenjanin, Serbia. In 1908, he performed together with Czech barytonist Bohumír Nepomucký on the concert tour through Europe. After returning to Trnava, in 1909, he became regenschori at the Saint Nicholas Cathedral in Trnava and remained at this post until his death.

== Works ==
His most known achievement is a compilation of Catholic songs Jednotný katolícky spevník (Standard Catholic hymnbook) created on demand by Spolok svätého Vojtecha (St. Vojtech Society). It was published in 1937 after about fifteen years of work and contains over 500 songs, nearly half of them auctorial. Some of the songs were taken from the first Slovak Catholic hymnbook Cantus catholici (1651 or 1655). Since its publication, this hymnbook has been used as the main source of the church songs by all Slovak Catholics. For this work, he was named the Knight of the Order of St. Gregory the Great by Pope Pius XI in 1933.

== Recordings ==
- Štefan Margita Smiles and Tears; Mikuláš Schneider-Trnavský Slzy a úsmevy, Op.25 (Smiles and Tears) song cycle.
- Gabriela Beňačková From the Heart: Mikuláš Schneider-Trnavský Songs about Mother: If Only They Knew; Mother; If I Knew; Little Flower: Far and Wide; The Nightingale; A Lovely Dream; Student Period Songs: The Settler; The Bowed Rose; Your Shy Eyes; The Girl Is Being Married; From My Heart: The Withering Tree; The Cuckoo; Roses.

== Sources ==
- Biography at osobnosti.sk (in Slovak)
- 50 years ago Mikuláš Schneider-Trnavský died (in Slovak)
