= Alexander Albrecht =

Alexander Albrecht

Alexander Albrecht (12 August 1885, Arad, Hungarian Kingdom - 30 August 1958, Bratislava) was a composer, an important exponent of the Slovak music in the first half of the 20th century.

== Biography ==
His father Ján (Johann) Albrecht was a professor at the gymnasium, and his mother Mária von Vaszary came from an old Hungarian family. From 1895 to 1903 he attended the Royal Catholic Gymnasium in Bratislava, where he met and befriended Béla Bartók. From 1904 to 1908 he studied at the Franz Liszt Academy of Music in Budapest. He studied composition as a pupil of Hans Koessler (a cousin of Max Reger and a great admirer of Johannes Brahms), and piano with István Thomán. Among his other teachers were Ferencz Szandtner, with whom he studied conducting, and David Popper (a chamber music teacher). During his studies Albrecht asserted himself as a successful pianist. Concurrently he studied also law.

Following his return to Bratislava in 1908, he accepted the post of organist at the St. Martin's Cathedral. Simultaneously he perfected his organ playing technique with Rudolph Dittrich in Vienna. He also worked as a teacher at the Mestská hudobná škola ("City Music School") in Bratislava.

In 1918 he married the linguist Margaréta Fischerová.

In 1921, after the death of Eugen Kossow, the director of the "City Music School" and bandmaster of the Kirchenmusikverein zu St. Martin, Albrecht took over his place. However, the school was closed in 1945, and in 1952 also the Kirchenmusikverein ceased to exist.

Alexander Albrecht committed suicide on 30 August 1958, shortly after his 73rd birthday.

== Style ==
He began his composing career at the Budapest Academy. His teacher Hans Koessler attempted to instill the classical composing principles in his pupils, but Albrecht found an inspiration also in modern compositions of his contemporaries. He studied works of Stravinsky, Malipiero, Milhaud, Reger, Debussy and others. He gradually developed his original music language already in his juvenile works, such as Andante con moto for organ, Piano Suite or the String Quartet in D major. His compositions were also slightly influenced by Art Nouveau.

In the period from 1925 to 1928 he managed to establish own compositional language, most significantly apparent in the Sonatina for Eleven Instruments of 1925. Later he focused on application of his new stylistic inventions and ideas. The most valued compositions from this period are the Quintet for Flute, Oboe, Clarinet, Bassoon and Piano and the Symphony in One Movement.

In his last composing period, Albrecht worked mainly on transcriptions of his older compositions.
