= Martin Chovan =

Slovak ice hockey defenceman

- Born: 20 August 1986 (age 38); Bratislava, Czechoslovakia
- Height: 6 ft 1 in (185 cm)
- Weight: 190 lb (86 kg; 13 st 8 lb)
- Position: Defence
- Shoots: Right
- Slovak 2. Liga team Former teams: HC Dukla Senica; ŠHK 37 Piešťany; HK 36 Skalica; LHK Jestřábi Prostějov; HK Dukla Trenčín; HC Košice; MsHK Žilina; Saryarka Karagandy; Yertis Pavlodar; HC 07 Detva; HK Poprad; Bratislava Capitals; HC Nové Zámky
- Playing career: 2004–present

Martin Chovan (born 20 August 1986) is a Slovak professional ice hockey defenceman, who is currently free agent.

== Career ==
Chovan began playing at junior level for HC Oceláři Třinec before turning pro with ŠHK 37 Piešťany of the Slovak 1. Liga in 2004. The following season, Chovan made his Tipsport Liga debut for HK 36 Skalica during the 2005–06 season where he played three games.

After spells in the Slovak 1. Liga with Piešťany and HK 91 Senica as well in the Czech 1. Liga for LHK Jestřábi Prostějov, Chovan joined HK Dukla Trenčín in 2008. He spent three and a half years with Trenčín, Chovan moved to HC Košice during the 2011–12 season. He then moved to MsHK Žilina during the 2013–14 season.

The following season, Chovan moved to Kazakhstan, splitting the season with Saryarka Karagandy in the Supreme Hockey League and Yertis Pavlodar in the Kazakhstan Hockey Championship. He then returned to Slovakia with HC Nové Zámky of the 1. Liga on September 4, 2015. On October 3, 2017, Chovan left Nové Zámky and joined HC 07 Detva three days later.

== Career statistics ==
=== Regular season and playoffs ===
			Regular season					Playoffs
Season	Team	League	GP	G	A	Pts	PIM	GP	G	A	Pts	PIM
