= Augustín Čisár =

Slovak diplomat

Augustín Čisár is a Slovak diplomat and the Ambassador Extraordinary and Plenipotentiary of the Slovak Republic to the Russian Federation.
