= Kontrafakt =

Slovak hip hop group

- Origin: Piešťany, Slovakia
- Genres: Hip hop; Rap
- Years active: 2001–present
- Labels: BbaRáK; Sony Music Entertainment; Tvoj Tatko Records
- Members: Rytmus; Ego; Anys

Kontrafakt is a Slovak hip-hop rap group which was formed in 2001.

== History ==
Kontrafakt's third album Navždy was released six years after their second, Bozk na rozlůčku. It was named by SOZA as the highest-selling album in Slovakia for 2013. In 2019, Kontrafakt released their fourth studio album, Real Newz, which had some new names on it such as Dalyb, Samey, Zayo, Dokkeytino, Viktor Sheen, Calin, among others. In 2020, Kontrafakt's music video "Ideme dnu" (lit. 'We Go In') was nominated for Best Cinematography at the Berlin Music Video Awards. The cinematographer behind this music video is Radim Strelka.

== Members ==
- Rytmus
- Ego
- DJ Anys

== Discography ==
=== Mixtapes ===
- Tri špinavé mená (2003)

=== Studio albums ===
- E.R.A. (2004)
- Bozk na rozlúčku (2007)
- Navždy (2013)
- Real Newz (2019)
- KF ako Rolls (2021)

=== Singles ===
- "Dáva mi" (2003)
- "I tak to osiągnę" (WWO feat. Orion, Włodi, Kontrafakt & Soundkail) (2006)
- "Stokujeme Vonku" (2013)
