= Tibor Frešo =

Czechoslovak conductor and composer (1918–1987)

Tibor Frešo (20 November 1918 – 7 July 1987) was a Slovak composer and conductor.

Frešo was born in Spišský Štiavnik. He conducted the orchestra of the Slovak National Theatre as well as the Slovak Philharmonic. He died in Piešťany.
