= Rytmus =

Slovak rapper

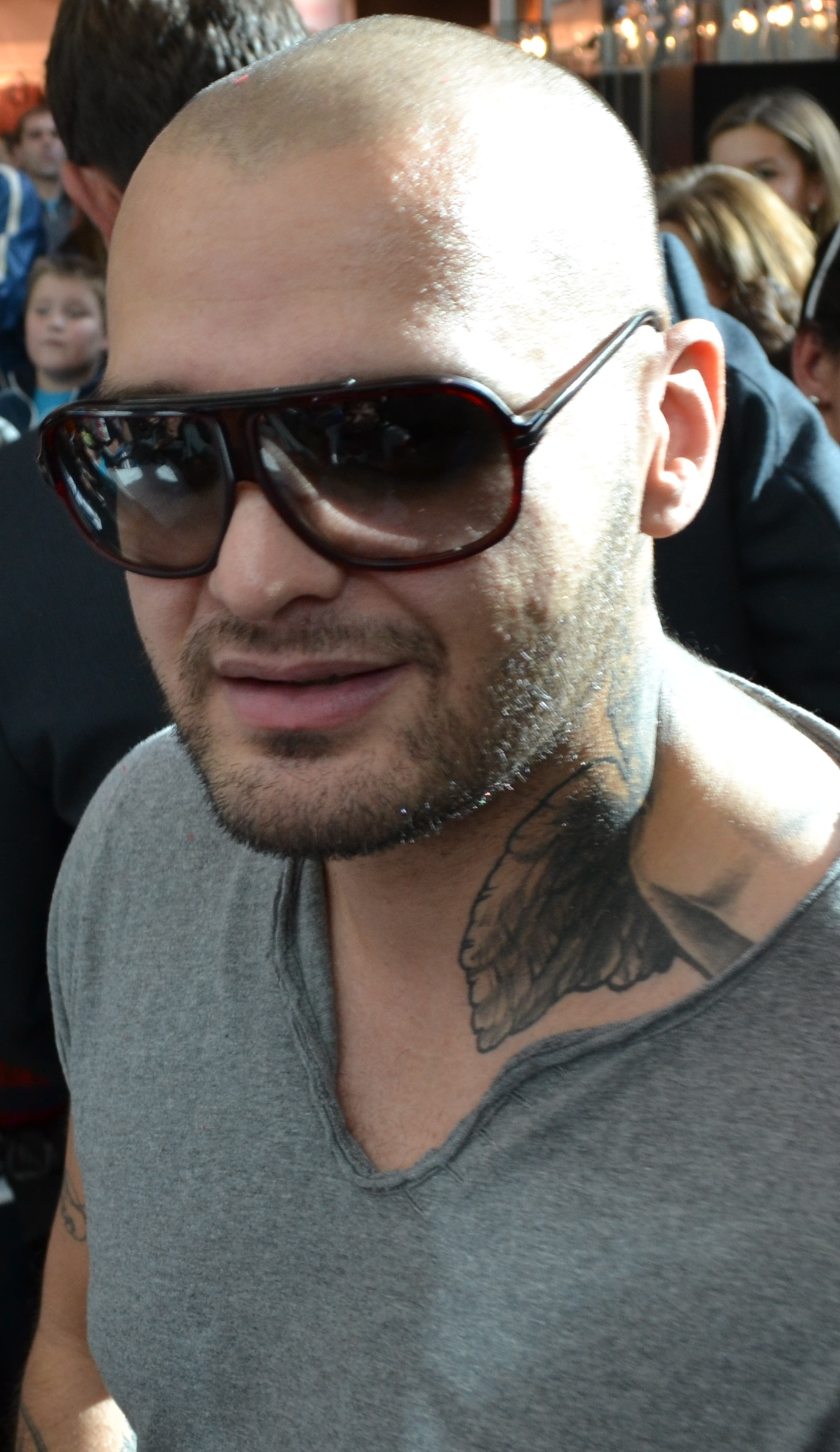
- Rytmus in October 2012

Background information
- Born: Patrik Vrbovský; 3 January 1977 (age 49); Kroměříž, Czechoslovakia
- Origin: Piešťany, Slovakia
- Genres: Hip hop; pop; R&B; electro; dubstep
- Occupations: Rapper; singer; songwriter; actor; television personality
- Instrument: Vocals
- Years active: 1992–present
- Labels: Sony BMG; EMI; Tvoj Tatko Records

Patrik Vrbovský (born 3 January 1977), better known by his stage name Rytmus, is a Slovak rapper, singer, songwriter, actor, and television personality.

== Early life ==
Patrik Vrbovský was born in Kroměříž to an ethnic Romani family and raised in Pieštany. He co-founded the Slovak hip-hop group Kontrafakt.

== Career ==
=== Early musical career ===
Rytmus was active on the hip-hop scene since 1992. He released his first solo album, Bengoro, in 2006; the album was reissued two years later with a new cover and a slightly modified tracklist.

In 2008, he released the compilation Si zabil, which sold over 4,000 copies in the first week and was awarded a gold record. In October 2008, he opened his own shop, of French brand Kaporal, in the Polus shopping centre. He released his second solo album, Král in 2009.

His mass popularity largely results from his appearances as a judge on the talent shows SuperStar and Hlas Česko Slovenska.

=== 2010s ===
In 2010, Rytmus collaborated in the song "Monopol" by producer Grimaso for their album, Let the beat come true. The music video was first published on 18 June on Rytmus' official Facebook page. In October 2010 Rytmus went on an eight-city tour of Slovakia, called Spiš Showtime Rytmus Král Tour, with Marián Čekovský's live band and Tina.

The single "Technotronic Flow", produced by DJ Mad Skill featuring Rytmus, reached #1 in the Slovak music charts in 2011. In December 2011 he released his third solo album, Fenomén. That year Rytmus was the most searched Slovak singer on YouTube, as well as having two of the top ten most searched songs by Slovak users: 'Technotronic Flow' (number 1) and "Fenomén" (number 8).

He released a compilation album, Jediný čo hreší in December 2012. In December 2016 he released his latest album Krstný Otec (Godfather), which was recorded in the Zrkadlový háj area of Bratislava and Turčianske Teplice. In November 2023 Rytmus released Bengoro 2, with the lead single "Bengoro je spátky" being released at the same time.

== Discography ==
=== Studio albums ===
Solo

- Bengoro (2006)
- Král (2009)
- Fenomén (2011)
- Krstný otec (2016)
- Bengoro II (2023)

=== Compilation albums ===
- Si zabil (2008)
- Jediný čo hreší (2012)
