= Viliam Figuš-Bystrý =

Slovak composer and teacher

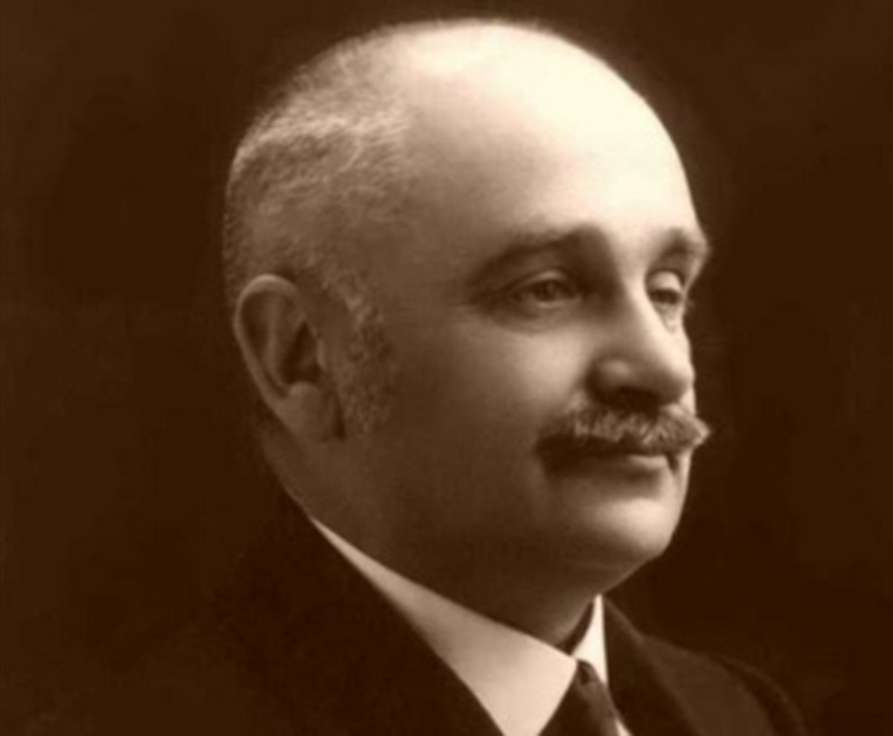
Viliam Figuš-Bystrý, Slovak composer, teacher and author (1875 – 1937)

Viliam Figuš-Bystrý (born Viliam Figuš) (28 February 1875 – 11 May 1937) was a Slovak composer, teacher and author of the first Slovak national opera Detvan.

Viliam Figuš was born in Banská Bystrica. He attended gymnasium from 1885 to 1889 and teacher's institute in Banská Štiavnica from 1889 to 1893. After graduating, he worked as a teacher in Pilis, Ostrá Lúka, Zvolenská Slatina, Padina. In 1907, he settled in Banská Bystrica, where he taught at Lutheran school. From 1911 to 1914, he studied under Zoltán Kodály at the Franz Liszt Academy of Music.

While teaching in various towns, he collected folksongs and published their adaptations in a few collections (Slovenské ľudové piesne z Veľkej Slatiny, 1000 slovenských ľudových piesní, Púchovské piesne, Zbojnícke piesne). Also in his compositions, he was inspired by folksongs from central Slovakia and in youth also from Hungary. Besides arranging folksongs, he composed orchestral works, chamber music, cantata, piano and violin pieces and songs. In 1926, he finished his opera Detvan, Op. 64, the first Slovak national opera, based on poem Detvan by Andrej Sládkovič.

Figuš-Bystrý was an important part of musical life in Banská Bystrica. He was one of the founding members of the Association of the Slovak Artists, being its chairman in 1925.

He died in Banská Bystrica.

== Sources ==
- Biography and list of works at osobnosti.sk (in Slovak)
- Slovak Wikipedia article
- Biography (in Slovak)
