= Iris Szeghy =

Slovak composer

Iris Szeghy (born 1956) is a Slovak composer living in Switzerland.

== Biography ==
Iris Szeghy was born in Prešov, Slovakia. She studied piano and composition at the Conservatory in Košice and composition at the Music Academy in Bratislava, she ended it with a doctoral degree at the same school. Szeghy went through numerous composer residencies - at the Akademie Schloss Solitude in Stuttgart, at the University of California at San Diego, at the STEIM Studio in Amsterdam, at the State Opera in Hamburg, at the Cité Internationale des Arts in Paris, she was a scholar of the Landis & Gyr Foundation in London and Budapest etc.

Iris Szeghy has won many international composition awards, her work has been performed and broadcast in Europe, America and Australia.

== Works ==
Szeghy composes for orchestra, chamber ensembles and voice. Selected works include:

- Hommage à Rodin - Touches with three Statues of the Master 1982
- Musica Dolorosa (String Quartet) 1985
- Minifanfare 1986
- Canto Triste Nocturne for Trombone (Violoncello) and Piano 1986
- Afforismi 1990
- Afforismi II 1992
- Midsummer Night's Mystery 1992
- Midsummer Night's Mystery II 1993
- Musica Folclorica - Hommage à Bartók 1996
- A Day in Manhattan / Un Jour à Manhattan 1996
- Un Petit Sentiment de Pojogne 1998
- Poetic Studies / Poetische Studien 1984
- Variations on a German Folk Song / Variationen über ein deutsches Volkslied 1995
- It-Movements 2001
- Afforismi III 1992
- Streichtrio "Goldberg" / String trio "Goldberg" 2007
- Choral 2008
- Afforismi IV 2009
- Neniae 2010
- A Game / Ein Spiel 1985
- Bekenntnisse / Confessions 1984 Choir a cappella
- Three Shakespearean Songs 1990 Choir a cappella
- War es so? / Was It Like That? 1985 Choir and solo instrument(s)
- Frühlingskranz / Spring Wreath 1989 Choir and solo instrument(s)
- Psalm 130 for Mixed Choir and Organ 1999 Choir and solo instrument(s)
- Concerto for Violoncello and Orchestra 1989
- Tableaux d´un parc 1999
- Spring Sonata / Frühlingssonate 1984
- Vivat Sommer / Vivat Summer! - Little Suite for Clarinet 1985
- Suite Into Pocket / Suite de Poche 1986
- Ciaccona 1991
- Preludio e Danza für Bassklarinette oder Bassetthorn 1992
- Canzona 1992
- Perpetuum Mobile 1993
- Wir gehen in den Zoo! / Let us go to Zoo! 1984
- Bolero-Blues 2000
- Canticum 2002
- Slowakischer Tanz für Violine oder Violoncello 2006
- Christmas Carol 2009
- In Between 1993 Live and tape music
- Story 1995 Live and tape music
- Psalm eines Verhungerten / Psalm of a Starving Man 1988
- The Prayer / La Preghiera / Ima 1998
- Secret Love 1999
- Psalm - for solo voice on a poem by Paul Celan 1993 Solo voice(s) a cappella
- Oratio et Gratias Actio Pro Sanitate Matris Meae 1994 Solo voice(s) a cappella
- Vivat Heidelberg! 1996 Solo voice(s) with ensemble
- Vielleicht, dass uns etwas aufginge 2003 Solo voice(s) with orchestra
- Simple and Difficult 1978 Solo voice(s) with solo instrument(s)
- To You - 4 Love Songs from the Songs of Solomon 1983 Solo voice(s) with solo instrument(s)
- De profundis - 4 songs for voice and 2 melodical instruments based on 4 poems by Michelangelo Buonarrotti 1990
- Ave Maria - for solo voice and solo instruments 1992
- When I Die 1999 Solo voice(s) with solo instrument(s)
- Psalm 130 1999 Solo voice(s) with solo instrument(s)
- Anrufung des Grossen Bären 2003 Solo voice(s) with solo instrument(s)
- Hesse-Fragments - Cycle for Voice and Piano 2006
- Musica Dolorosa 1985 String orchestra
- Ad Parnassum für Strings Inspired by Pictures of Paul Klee 2005 String orchestra
- Homewards 1997 Symphony orchestra
