= Tina (singer) =

Slovak singer (born 1984)

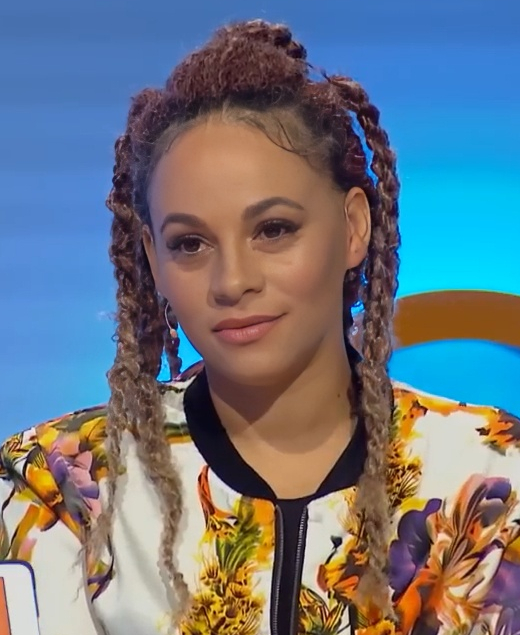
- Tina in 2023

Background information
- Born: Martina Csillaghová; 11 March 1984 (age 42)
- Origin: Prešov, Czechoslovakia
- Occupation: Singer
- Years active: 2003–present

Tina (born Martina Csillagová; 11 March 1984) is a Slovak singer. She won the Best Female Singer prize at the Slávik Awards in 2011 and 2012. Tina co-hosted the 2011 edition of Czech/Slovak television series SuperStar alongside Leoš Mareš. She returned to host alongside Mareš in the first two series of The Voice Česko Slovensko.

== Personal life ==
Tina has a son, Leo, with footballer Richard Lásik. She married rapper Separ in 2014.

== Discography ==
=== Studio albums ===
- 2004: Tina
- 2006: Chillin
- 2009: Veci sa menia
- 2011: S.E.X.Y.

=== Other albums ===
- 2012: Best Of
- 2014: Unplugged CD 2004–2014

== Awards and nominations ==
Year	Nominated work	Award	Category	Result	Ref
2011	Herself	Slávik Awards	Best Female Singer	Winner	
2012	Herself	Slávik Awards	Best Female Singer	Winner	
