= Pavol Gábor =

Slovak opera singer

Pavol Gábor (1 December 1932 – 28 August 2003) was a Slovak operatic tenor who had an active international career during the 1960s through the 1990s. He had a lengthy and fruitful partnership at the Slovak National Theatre which lasted for over three decades.

== Biography ==
Born in Varín, Gábor studied at the Bratislava Conservatory under Ida Černecká and then at the Academy of Performing Arts in Bratislava with Anna Korínska and in his final year of study Janko Blaho. He was a leading performer at the Slovak National Theatre for 35 years, making his debut at the house on New Years Day 1960. He particularly excelled in comic roles. Among his signature parts were Count Almaviva in The Barber of Seville, Basilio in The Marriage of Figaro, Triquet in Eugene Onegin, Puk in A Midsummer Night's Dream, the Minister in Juraj Beneš's The Emperor's New Clothes, Smelkov in Ján Cikker's Vzkriesenie, and Vašek in The Bartered Bride. The biggest success of his career came in 1966 when he portrayed the title role in Albert Herring.

Gábor was also active on the international stage, singing as a guest artist at the National Theatre in Prague, La Monnaie, and with opera houses in Germany, Greece, and Iran. He was notably committed to the Hamburg State Opera from 1967 to 1968 and performed at almost all of the opera houses in his home nation. He also toured with the Slovak National Theatre for performances in the Soviet Union, the Netherlands, Germany, Spain, Bulgaria, Romania, and Yugoslavia.

In addition to his work in opera, Gábor was an active concert performer and recitalist. He performed with most of the major orchestras in his nation and Czech Republic during his career. He was also an admired performer of Slovak folk music and was interested in the traditional folk dances of his country.

Gábor gave his last public singing performance on New Year's Eve 1995. He died in Bratislava at the age of 70.

== Sources ==
- Biography of Pavol Gábor at slavni.terchova-info.sk (in Slovak)
