= Ladislav Burlas =

Slovak composer and musicologist (1927–2024)

- Burlas in the 1960s
- Born: 3 April 1927; Trnava, Czechoslovakia
- Died: 11 February 2024 (aged 96); Bratislava, Slovakia
- Education: Bratislava Conservatory; Comenius University; Academy of Performing Arts in Bratislava
- Occupations: Composer; Musicologist
- Organizations: Slovak Academy of Sciences; Banská Bystrica

Ladislav Burlas (3 April 1927 – 11 February 2024) was a Slovak composer and musicologist. He worked at the institute of musicology at the Slovak Academy of Sciences in Bratislava from 1951 to 1990, as director of the institution from 1964 to 1974. The focus of his studies was the music history of Slovakia, especially of the 20th century. He was dean of the faculty of performing arts at the Academy of Arts in Banská Bystrica from 2001 to 2005. He composed music in many genres with a focus on choral music and educational pieces.

== Life and career ==
Born in Trnava on 3 April 1927, he completed school there in 1946 and studied from 1946 to 1951, composition with Alexander Moyzes and conducting at the Bratislava Conservatory and musicology at the Comenius University. He gained a PhD with a dissertation, "Cantus Catholici – prispevok k analýze hudby feudálnej spoločnosti na Slovensku" (Cantus Catholici – a contribution to the analysis of music in the feudal society of Slovakia). From 1951 he studied composition further with Moyzes, then at the Academy of Performing Arts in Bratislava. He worked at the Institute of Musicology at the Slovak Academy of Sciences in Bratislava from 1951 to 1990, serving as director from 1964 to 1974. He also lectured music history and music theory at the university, the Academy of Performing Arts and other universities. He wrote his habilitation in 1966, becoming associate professor in 1967, and was appointed professor in 1993. He was dean of the faculty of performing arts at the Academy of Arts in Banská Bystrica from 2001 to 2005.

Burlas composed in many genres, for orchestra, chamber music, piano music and other works for solo instruments, with a focus on choral music and educational pieces. He also wrote music for documentaries and arrangements of folk songs.

His musicological publications covered topics such as older and younger Slovak music history, music theory, and the founders of Slovak contemporary music in the 20th century including Eugen Suchoň, Alexander Moyzes and Ján Cikker. He authored more than 150 books, monographs, scientific texts, articles and reflections. In 1998 he created an audio record of his memories. It was used for a 2017 book, then titled The Coordinates of my Life.

Burlas died in Bratislava on 11 February 2024, at the age of 96.

== Awards ==
Burlas received awards including:

- 1966: Mikuláš Schneider-Trnavský-Preis, for children's choral works Padá lístie zlaté
- 1998: Prize of Trnava
- 2002: Memorial Plaque
- 2006: Gold medal of Matej Bel-Universität Banská Bystrica
- 2008: Pribina Cross for contributions of the cultural development of Slovakia
- 2010: Pavel Strauss Award, for merits in culture and art
- 2018: Prize of the ministry of culture of Slovakia for his life's work for Slovak music culture
- 2021: Jozef Kresánek Prize for his musicological work

== Publications ==
=== Musicology ===
Musicological publications by Burlas include:

- Realistické tradície slovenskej hudby (True traditions of Slovak music), Martin, 1952
- Alexander Moyzes, Bratislava, 1956
- Slovenská hudobná moderna (Slovak modern music), Obzor, Bratislava, 1983
- Pohľady na súčasnú slovenskú hudobnú kultúru (Insight in contemporary Slovak music culture), Bratislava, 1987
- Teória hudobnej pedagogiky (Theory of music pedagogy), Prešov, 1997
- Hudba – komunikatívny dynamizmus (Music – communicative dynamics), Bratislava, 1998
- Hudba – želania a rezultáty: zobrané muzikologické spisy z rokov 1957–1999 (Music – wishes and results: collected musicological writings 1957–1999), Bratislava, 2000
- A History of Slovak Music: From the Earliest Times to the Present, VEDA, 2003 (translated by Martin Styan)
- Slávka Kopćáková (ed.): Ladislav Burlas and the Slovak Music Culture University of Presov Press, 2017

=== Compositions ===
Compositions by Burlas include:

==== Ballet ====
- Čertoviny (Monkey Business). Dance fairy tale for children in six scenes after a folk fairy tale in the version by Pavol Dobšinský (1991)

==== Solo voices, choir and orchestra ====
- Banická kantátá (Miners' Cantata) for mezzo-soprano, baritone, mixed choir and orchestra (1955)
- Stretnúť človeka (To Meet a Man). Vokal symphony, text by Ján Kostra, for mezzo-soprano, baritone, mixed choir and orchestra- (1984)

==== Choir and orchestra ====
- Svadobné spevy z Horehronia (Wedding Songs from Upper Hron) for mixed choir and orchestra (1957/1958)
- Four Military Folk Songs for mixed choir and orchestra (1959)

==== Orchestra ====
- Symphonic Triptych, Op. 2 (1956)
- Epitaph, Op. 3 (1957)
- Horehronský tanec (Dance from Horehonie) (1959)
- Concertino for wind instruments and percussion (1971)
- Symphony No. 2 (1986)

==== String orchestra ====
- Malá serenáda (Little Serenade) (1958)
- Bagatelles (1959)
- Planctus (1968)
- To Matici slovenskej (1987)
- In memoriam (1999)

==== Concertante ====
- Hudba (Music) for violin and orchestra (1977)
- Organ Concerto (1983/1984)

==== Chamber music ====
- Spievajúce srdce (A Singing Heart) for string sextet, Op. 4 (1960)
- Hudba (Music) for string quartet, dedicated to Béla Bartók (1969)
- String Quartet No. 2 "pamiatke S. S. Prokofieva" (in memory of Sergei Prokofiev (1972)
- String Quartet No. 3 "In memoriam D. D. Schostakowitsch" (1977)
- Poetická hudba (Poetic Music) for wind quintet (1983)
- Sonata a tre for clarinet, vibraphone and piano (1985)

==== Piano ====
- Ciaconna a fúga (1953)
- Fantasia (1958)
- Sonatina (1978)
- Lyrická hudba (Lyrical Music) (1979)
- To Matici slovenskej (1987)

=== Solo instrument ===
- Sonatina for violin (1968)
- Concert Sonata for violin (1974)
- Cadenza for violin (1974)
- Violin Sonata (1975)
- Poetická hudba (Poetic Music) for organ (1983)
- Cadenza No. 2 for violin (1997)
- Fantasia for flute (2005)

==== Choir ====
- Metamorfózy krás (Metamorphoses of Beauties) after Ján Smrek for mixed choir and violin (1964)
- Zvony (The Bells) after Milan Rúfus for mixed choir (1969)
- Je ticho už (It is Quiet Now) after Rúfus for mixed choir (1972)
- Slovenské partizánske ľudové piesne (Slovak Partisan Folk Songs) for men's choir (1973)
- Prvomájová after Vladimír Reisel for women's choir (1974)
- Šesť básní lásky! (Sixh Love Poems) after Reisel for mixed choir (1975)
- Hymnus času (The Hymn of the Time) after Ján Kostra for men's choir (1980)
- Dobrý deň! (Good Day!). Choral cycle after poems by Ladislav Novomeský for mixed choir (1980, rev. 1984)
- Tararam for children's choir (1980)
- Súčasníkom (To Men of our Times) after Tadeusz Różewicz, Yevgeny Yevtushenko and Ján Stacho for three men's choirs (1985)
- Z knihy žalmov (From the Book of Psalms) for men's choir (1996)

==== Voice and instruments ====
- Zbojníkova žena (Highwayman's Wife) for voice, harp and clarinet (1965)

=== Recordings ===
Recordings of music by Burlas, as part of collections, include:

- Planctus – Slovak Chamber Orchestra, cond. Bohdan Warchal – Musica Slovaca 1992
- Organ Concerto – Ferdinand Klinda (organ), Slovak Radio Orchestra, cond. Ondrej Lenárd – in: Organ Compositions, with music by Eugen Suchoň (Opus, 1996)
- Sonata for violin solo – Dalibor Karvay (Opus, 1996)
- Padá lístie zlaté (Golden Leaves are Falling) – children's choir Bratislava, cond. Ondrej Šaray – in: Bratislavský Detský Zbor (Discant, 2000)
- Svadobné spevy z Horehronia (Wedding Songs from Upper Hron) – Lúčnica Choir, cond. Miroslav Šmíd – in: The Best of Lúčnica Chorus (Musica, 2006)
- Metamorfózy krás (Metamorphoses of Beauties ) – Peter Michalica (violin), Lúčnica Choir, cond. Štefan Klimo – in: Dr. Štefan Klimo: Za tou mojou milou (Ol Trade, 2009)
- Kadenz, Sonatina, Kadenz Nr. 2, Sonata, Konzertsonate – Milan Paľa (violin) – Violin Solo 1 – Milan Paľa (Pavlík Records, CD 2010)
- Sonata for violin solo – Koji Morishita (violin) – in: Suite Buenos Aires (Meister Music, 2012)
- String Quartet No. 3 – Moyzes Quartett – (Slowak Music Foundation, 2015)
- Cadenza – Dalibor Karvay (violin) – in: Souvenirs (Slowak Music Centre, 2017)
