= Bernath =

Bernath is a surname. Notable people with the surname include:

- Antonia Bernath (born 1985), English actress, voiceover artist and singer
- Aurél Bernáth (1895–1982), Hungarian painter and art theorist
- Csaba Bernáth (born 1979), Hungarian footballer
- Eitan Bernath (born 2002), American celebrity chef
- István Bernáth (born 1989), Hungarian professional boxer
- Ľubomír Bernáth (born 1985), Slovak football forward
- Ľuboš Bernáth (born 1977), Slovak composer and music educator
- Willy Bernath (1914–1991), Swiss cross-country skier
- Yisroel Bernath, Canadian-American Hassidic rabbi
