= Varín =

- Municipality
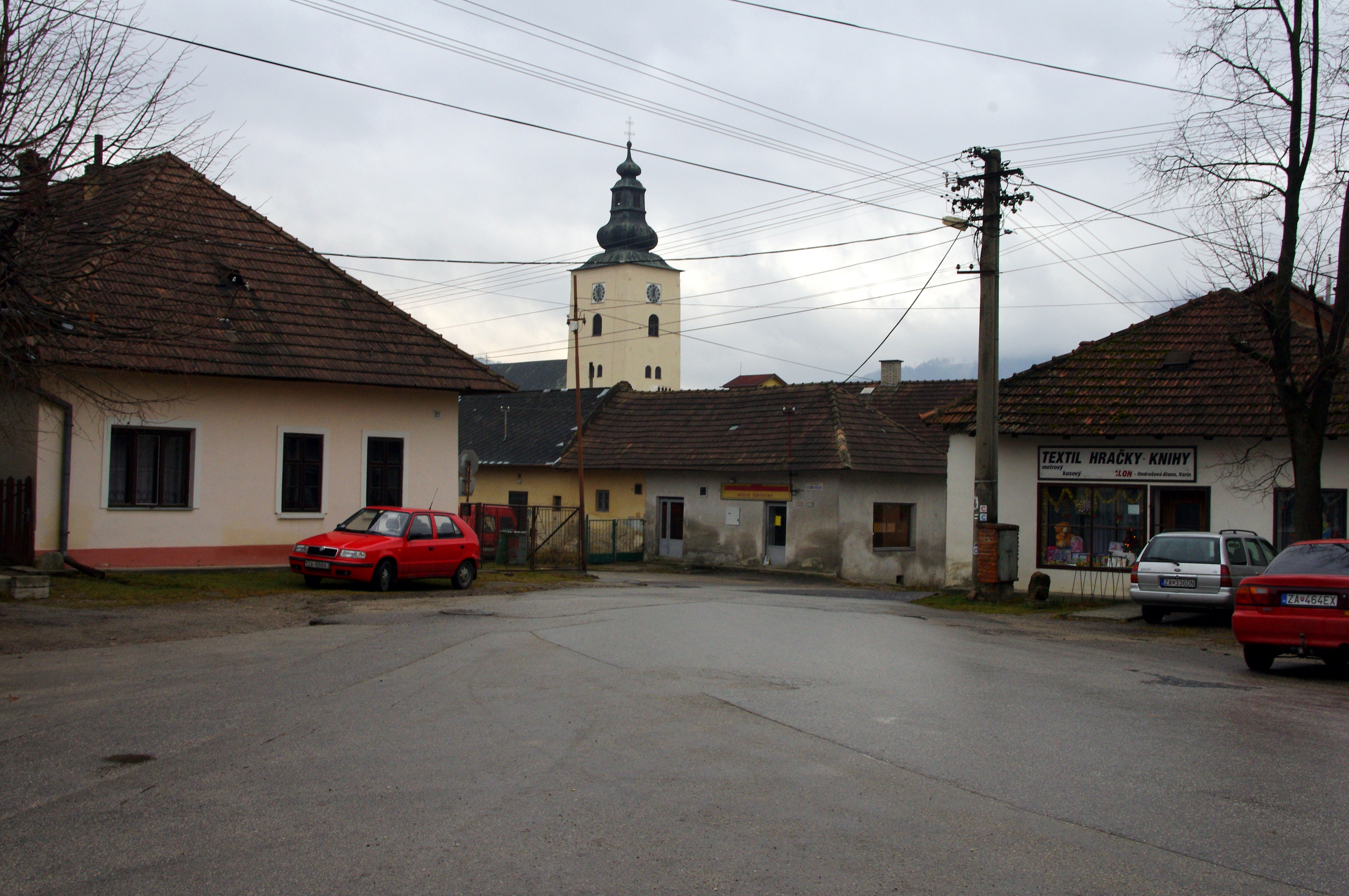

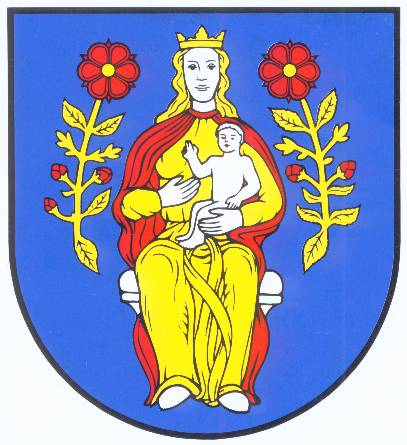
- Flag Coat of arms

- Location of Varín in the Žilina Region Location of Varín in Slovakia
- Coordinates: 49.20°N 18.88°E
- Country: Slovakia
- Region: Žilina Region
- District: Žilina District
- First mentioned: 1235

Area
  - Total: 19.09 km^{2} (7.37 sq mi)
- Elevation: 358 m (1,175 ft)

Population (2025)
  - Total: 3,841
- Time zone: UTC+1 (CET)
  - Summer (DST): UTC+2 (CEST)
- Postal code: 130 3
- Area code: +421 41
- Vehicle registration plate (until 2022): ZA
- Website: www.varin.sk

Varín (Hungarian: Várna) is a village and municipality in Žilina District in the Žilina Region of northern Slovakia. It is located at the Malá Fatra National Park and also serves as a tourist resort.

== Etymology ==
The name is derived from Proto-Slavic varъ (Slovak: var, "boiling"). The original name was a hydronym referring to foamed water.

== History ==
In historical records the village was first mentioned in 1235. In the middle of the 13th century as terra Warna it was property of the Cseszneky de Milvány family. In 1993, the local government named one of the streets after Jozef Tiso, president of the First Slovak Republic, a client state of Nazi Germany. This action sparked controversy amongst some people and in 2021 a law enforcement authority launched a criminal investigation.

== Geography ==
The municipality lies at an altitude of 358 metres (1,175 ft) and covers an area of 19.09 km^{2} (7.37 sq mi) (2025).

== Population ==
Population statistic (10 years)
Year	1995	2005	2015	2025
Count	3241	3491	3793	3841
Difference		+7.71%	+8.65%	+1.26%

Population statistic
Year	2024	2025
Count	3870	3841
Difference		−0.74%

It has a population of 3841 people (31 December 2025).

=== Ethnicity ===
Census 2021 (1+ %)
Ethnicity	Number	Fraction
Slovak	3806	97.68%
Not found out	57	1.46%
Total	3896	

In year 2021 was 3896 people by ethnicity 3806 as Slovak, 57 as Not found out, 33 as Czech, 12 as Other, 11 as Ukrainian, 9 as Russian, 5 as Italian, 5 as Rusyn, 5 as Hungarian, 3 as Vietnamese, 2 as Romani, 1 as Austrian, 1 as German and 1 as French.

Note on population: The difference values of population numbers in the table "Population statistic" and in the sections "Ethnicity" & "Religion" is caused by the use of various statistical methods.

=== Religion ===
Census 2021 (1+ %)
Religion	Number	Fraction
Roman Catholic Church	3288	84.39%
None	434	11.14%
Not found out	75	1.93%
Total	3896	

In year 2021 was 3896 people by religion 3288 from Roman Catholic Church, 434 from None, 75 from Not found out, 25 from Evangelical Church, 17 from Other, 16 from Greek Catholic Church, 9 from Ad hoc movements, 6 from Calvinist Church, 6 from Buddhism, 5 from Jehovah's Witnesses, 3 from Eastern Orthodox Church, 3 from Christian Congregations in Slovakia, 2 from Other and not ascertained christian church, 2 from Islam, 1 from Old Catholic Church, 1 from Paganism and natural spirituality, 1 from United Methodist Church, 1 from Czechoslovak Hussite Church and 1 from Church of the Brethren.

== Notable natives and residents ==
- Pavol Gábor, opera singer
- Ladislav Pfliegel, Hero of the Slovak National Uprising
