= Štefan Hoza =

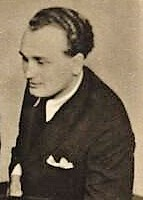
Štefan Hoza, 1937

Štefan Hoza (20 October 1906, Smižany – 6 April 1982, Czechoslovakia) was a Slovak operatic tenor, actor, librettist, educator, music publicist, and historian.

Hoza worked as a teacher before studying singing at the Academy of Performing Arts in Bratislava. Just weeks after graduating, Hoza made his professional opera debut at the Slovak National Theatre (SNT) in Bratislava in 1932. He remained at the theatre for the next three decades. He also pursued further vocal training in Prague (1932), Milan (1933), and Vienna (1936).

Hoza's repertoire at the SNT encompassed many heroic tenor roles and operetta roles; portraying more than 90 roles at the house during his lengthy career. He was especially praised for his portrayal of Prince Sou-Chong in Franz Lehár's The Land of Smiles. He notably portrayed the role of Ondrej Zimoň in the world premiere of Eugen Suchoň's Krútňava on 10 December 1949. He also co-wrote the libretto for that opera with Suchoň. He also wrote the librettos for two operas by Ján Cikker, Juro Jánošík (1954) and Beg Bajazid (1957). In addition to performing, Hoza worked as dramaturge at the SNT from 1939–1947. He also served as an opera director at the house for several productions between 1958–1962.

Hoza also worked as an actor in a few Czech films, portraying Bolko Baranský in Polská krev (1934), Stepan Urbanec in Hudba srdcí (1934), and the Head physician in Na pochode sa vzdy nespieva (1961). He also sang for the soundtracks of the first two aforementioned films and for Zem spieva (1933). As a music historian he published three books related to the history of opera in Slovakia: Tvorcovia hudby (1943), Opera na Slovensku (1954), and Večer v opere (1975). He also published a two volume autobiography, Ja svoje srdce dám, in 1989.

After retiring from the stage in 1962, Hoza joined the voice faculty of the Bratislava Conservatory, where he taught up until his death. He had already begun teaching singing privately in 1952. In 1968 he was named a National Artist by the government of Czechoslovakia. In 1977, he signed the Anticharta, the reaction of the ruling Communist Party of Czechoslovakia to Charter 77.
