= Ľuboš Bernáth =

Slovak composer and music educator

Ľuboš Bernáth (born 8 November 1977 in Nové Zámky) is a Slovak composer and music educator.

== Training and Career ==
Educated at the conservatory in Bratislava from 1996 to 2001, he subsequently studied with the composer Evgeni Irshai. Since 2008-09 he has been a teacher at the Bratislava Conservatory and at the Academy of Performing Arts in Bratislava (VŠMU). His compositions include choral and chamber music, as well as two symphonies. As a composer and conductor, Ľuboš Bernáth is represented at various festivals of contemporary music in Slovakia and internationally. In 2012, he was one of the co-founders of the youth orchestra EnsembleSpectrum at the VŠMU. In 2013 he became deputy chairman of the Slovak Composers' Association. He is a member of the Council for Science, Education and Culture of the Slovak Bishops' Conference.
