= Svätopluk (opera) =

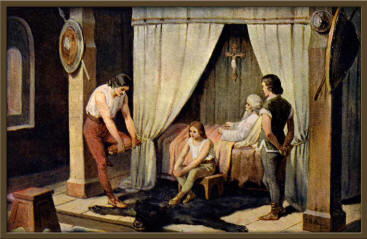
Josef Mathauser - Svatopluk and his sons

Svätopluk is a Slovak opera by Eugen Suchoň with the subtitle Musical drama in three acts. The libretto is by Eugen Suchoň, Ivan Stodola and Jela Krčméry-Vrteľová and is loosely based on Stodola's play Kráľ Svätopluk, which was in turn based on events in the life of King Svätopluk I. Suchoň composed Svätopluk between 1952 and 1959. It was premiered on 10 March 1960 in the Slovak National Theatre, directed by Miloš Wasserbauer and conducted by Tibor Frešo.

== Roles ==
| Role | Voice type |
|---|---|
| King Svätopluk I | bass |
| Mojmír, Svätopluk's son | baritone |
| Young Svätopluk (Svätopluk II), Svätopluk's son | tenor |
| Predslav, a monk, Svätopluk's son | baritone |
| The palatine Dragomír | baritone |
| Ľutomíra, princess of Pannonia | soprano |
| Zabój, a minstrel and scribe | tenor |
| Blagota, a slave | mezzo-soprano |
| Milena, her daughter | soprano |
| Bogat, a leader of the Pagans | bass-baritone |
| Guard of the Pagan sanctuary | tenor |
| Pagan prophet | tenor |
Pagan priestesses, soldiers, dukes, elders, pagans, officials, crowds, etc.

== Synopsis ==
The action takes place in the year 894 in Great Moravia. King Svätopluk I, believing that he is going to die, hands over his reign to his two sons. The fictional story is partially based on historical events and real persons.

=== Act 1 ===
The palace of Svätopluk at Veligrad, Greater Moravia.

The minstrel Záboj loves the Pannonian princess Ľutomíra who schemes to make her father king of Greater Moravia. Záboj reveals that Svätopluk is secretly concentrating his army along the River Danube and preparing to attack the Franks. Ľutomíra sends this news by a dove to the Pannonians.

King Svätopluk ceremonially inaugurates the new rulers of the kingdom - his sons Mojmír and young Svätopluk. Mojmír is a supporter of the teaching of Cyril and Methodius and wants to raise the people from enslavement, and rid the kingdom of Frankish priests. Young Svätopluk has his own ambitions, and wants to seize the throne for himself with the help of the Franks.

The slave Blagota, supported by Ľutomíra, asks for help for her daughter Milena, imprisoned by pagans who want to make her a living sacrifice to their god Perún. Svätopluk asks his sons for their opinions. Mojmír wants to free the girl immediately and destroy the pagans; whilst young Svätopluk pleads for the pagans whom he sees as his allies.

Both sons plunge the king into remorse when they remind him of his earlier betrayal of his uncle Rastislav to the Franks. His recovery is assisted by Záboj, whom he invites to sing of Rastislav, and whom he takes into his entourage, against the inclinations of his palatine Dragomir.

A soldier brings in a message found on the dove, which has been shot down — the message sent by Ľutomíra. The king is outraged, orders his army to gather and leads the assault against the Franks himself.

=== Act 2 ===
A Pagan woodland sacrificial site.

Preparations are made for Milena to be sacrificed at the burial of the pagan leader Dragoš, who died as a hero in battle, to become his bride in the after-life. Young Svätopluk arrives. Pagan prophets tell him the will of the god Perún: "kill the king, your father, and you will reign yourself". Young Svätopluk agrees and leaves. While the sacrificial preparations continue, a regiment of Mojmír's army arrives, breaks up the pagans, destroys their idols and frees young Milena who gratefully offers herself to Mojmir's service. The soldiers appeal to Mojmír to capture his father's castle and seize his throne, but Mojmír refuses to act against his father. He wants to meet with him and negotiate about the future of Great Moravia. Ľutomíra, overhearing this, decides to destroy Mojmír and to seek to become the ruler of Great Moravia herself.

=== Act 3 ===
Scene I: Svätopluk's military camp on the Danube.

Dragomír, acting on the information of Ľutomíra, orders Mojmir's imprisonment. Mojmír admits attacking the pagans, but denies the accusation that he sought to kill his father. Ľutomír then claims that the letter which she wrote, and which was captured by royal guard, was written by Mojmír. The king orders the imprisonment of Mojmír. Milena, who was witness to the events at the pagan camp, falls at the kings' feet and defends Mojmír; it is Svätopluk the younger who seeks to kill his father. On hearing this Dragomír strengthens the royal guards. At the full moon, young Svätopluk attempts to kill his father, but guards prevent him. The king expresses his astonishment and desperation to Dragomír.

Scene II: a terrace in the castle at Devin.

Svätopluk suffers a deep personal and emotional crisis – both sons are against him and, he believes, have tried to kill him. In his madness, he see visions of Perún and of Rastislav. He is found by his third son Predslav, a monk, who has come to beg for the lifting of the death sentences on his brothers. The king consents. He feels that his life is ending, so he gathers people and his sons, forgives them and divides his rule. Taking up three rods he warns his sons against disunity: "Separately they bend easily, but join them together and nobody will break them." Young Svätopluk is not satisfied with his role and attacks Mojmír with a sword. Mojmír is saved by Milena who protects him with her own body and is killed; during the struggle the King dies. Young Svätopluk flees saying: "Mojmír, we'll meet at the battlefield!" Záboj laments the bleak future of his people and looks forward to its eventual salvation.
