= Crime and Punishment (radio play) =

Crime and Punishment is a 1947 Australian radio play based on the novel Crime and Punishment by Fyodor Dostoevsky. Adapted by Richard Lane, it was called one of the best radio plays presented by the Macquarie Network, owing in part to Finch's reputation as a radio actor at the time.

It was one of a series of radio plays Finch appeared in around this time adapted from Russian novels other being Such Men are Dangerous and Redemption.

Smithy's Weekly called it "another of those deplorable potted-classics which commercial radio caterers occasionally dish up as a change from our daily serve of popular slops."

The Argus called it "one of radio's most stirring dramas".

Co star Max Osbiston recalled "I'll never forget either the feeling Peter exuded and the vibrations that came from that gaunt personality... You forgot it was a radio play or in fact a play of any kind. Here was a cathartic confession coming from a man haunted all these years by this double murder."

== Cast ==
- Peter Finch
- Lloyd Lamble
- Max Osbiston
- Lyndall Barbour
