= Resurrection (Tolstoy novel) =

1899 novel by Leo Tolstoy

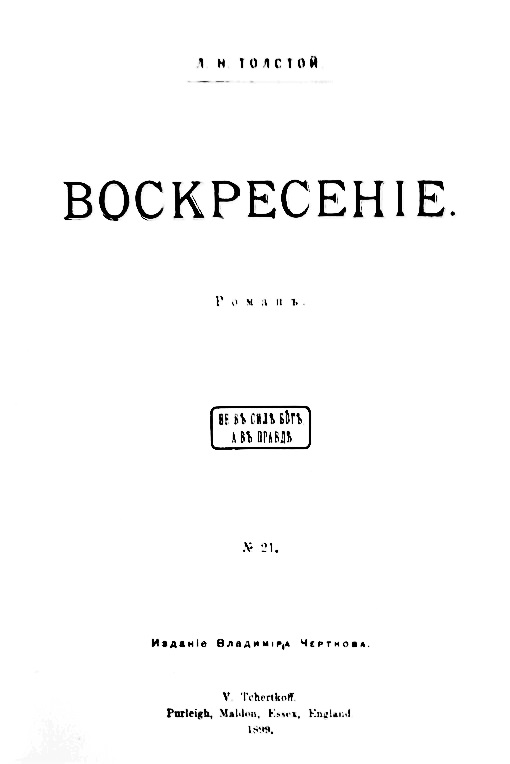
- Front page of Resurrection, first edition, 1899 (Russian)
- Author: Leo Tolstoy
- Original title: Воскресеніе
- Language: Russian
- Genre: Philosophical novel, political fiction
- Publisher: Niva
- Publication date: 1899
- Publication place: Russia
- English publication date: 1900
- Media type: Print
- Original text: Воскресеніе at Russian Wikisource
- Translation: Resurrection at Wikisource

Resurrection (pre-reform Russian: Воскресеніе; post-reform Russian: Воскресение, romanized: Voskreséniye, also translated as The Awakening), first published in December 1899, was the last novel written by Leo Tolstoy. The book is the final of his major long fiction works published in his lifetime. Tolstoy intended the novel as a panoramic view of Russia at the end of the 19th century from the highest to the lowest levels of society and as an exposition of the injustice of man-made laws and the hypocrisy of the institutionalized church. The novel also explores the economic philosophy of Georgism, of which Tolstoy had become a very strong advocate towards the end of his life, and explains the theory in detail. The publication of Resurrection led to Tolstoy's excommunication by the Holy Synod from the Russian Orthodox Church in 1901.

== Background ==
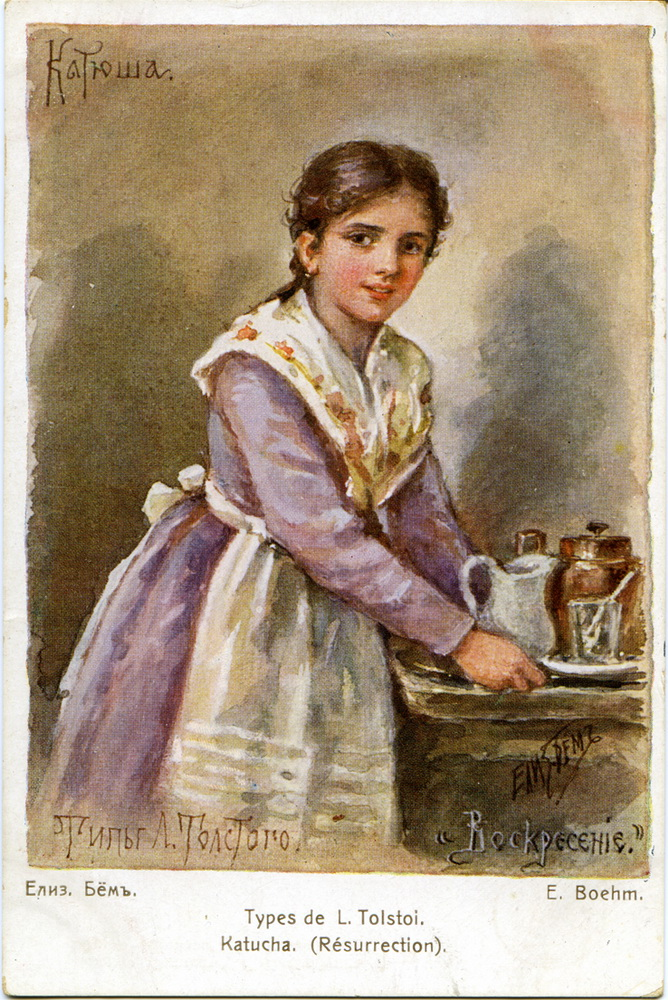
Katusha Maslova depicted on a postcard by Elisabeth Boehm

The theme for the new novel had been supplied by Tolstoy's friend Anatoly Koni. He told Tolstoy the story of a man who had come to him for legal aid. As a youth this man had seduced a pretty orphan girl of sixteen who had been taken into the home of a relative of the young man when her parents died. Once her benefactress observed the girl's pregnant condition, she drove her away. Abandoned by her seducer, the girl, after hopeless attempts to earn an honest livelihood, became a prostitute. Caught stealing money from one of her drunken "guests" in a brothel, the girl was arrested. By accident of fate, the jury that tried the case included her seducer. His conscience awakened to the injustice of his behaviour, he decided to marry the girl, who was sentenced to four months in prison. Koni concluded his story by relating that the couple did actually marry, but shortly after her sentence expired, the girl died from typhus.

Tolstoy was moved by Koni's story, partly because it resembled an incident from his own life. For shortly before his death he told his biographer of two seductions in his life which he could never forget: "The second was the crime I committed with the servant Masha in my aunt's house. She was a virgin. I seduced her, and she was dismissed and perished." Although actually, as Pavel Basinsky says, she worked later in the house of Tolstoy's sister.

In August 1898, after much deliberation and consulting with colleagues, Tolstoy decided to quickly finish, copyright and sell the novel to aid the emigration of persecuted pacifist Spiritual Christian Dukhobortsy from Russia to Canada. He completed it in December 1899.

The book was to be published serially simultaneously in Russia, Germany, France, England and America, to quickly raise funds and give him time to finish the story, but delayed due to contract "difficulties" requiring parts to be censored and shortened. It appeared in the popular Russian weekly magazine Niva illustrated by Leonid Pasternak, and in the American monthly magazine The Cosmopolitan as The Awakening. Many publishers printed their own editions because they assumed that Tolstoy had given up all copyrights as he had done with previous books. The complete text was not published in Russia until 1936, and in English in 1938.

Tolstoy's contribution of 34,200 rubles to the plight of Dukhobortsy (US$17,000) had been acknowledged several times in gratitude and aid to the Tolstoy Estate "Yasnaya Polyana" by the descendants of Dukhobortsy in Canada.

One of the characters, Toporov, is an obvious caricature of Konstantin Pobedonostsev, then Ober-Procurator of the Most Holy Synod.

== Plot ==
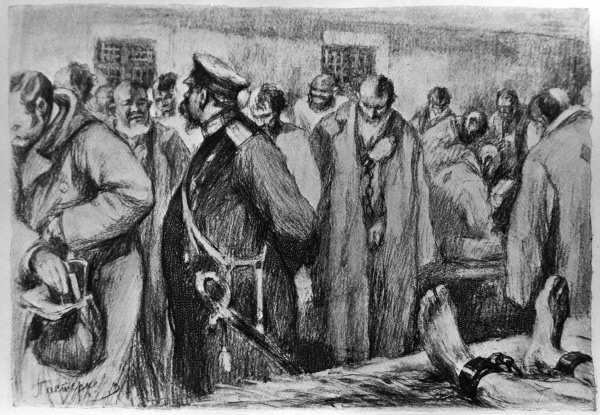
An illustration by Leonid Pasternak.

The story is about a nobleman named Dmitri Ivanovich Nekhlyudov, who seeks redemption for a sin committed years earlier. When he was a younger man, at his two aunts' estate, he fell in love with their ward, Katyusha (Katerina Mikhailovna Maslova), who is goddaughter to one aunt and treated badly by the other. However, after going to the city and becoming corrupted by drink and gambling, he returns two years later to his aunts' estate and sexually assaults Katyusha, leaving her pregnant. She is then thrown out by his aunt, and proceeds to face a series of unfortunate and unpleasant events, before she ends up working as a prostitute, going by her surname, Maslova.

Ten years later, Nekhlyudov sits on a jury which sentences the girl, Maslova, to prison in Siberia for murder (poisoning a client who beat her, a crime of which she is innocent). The book narrates his attempts to help her practically, but focuses on his personal, mental, and moral struggle. He goes to visit her in prison, meets other prisoners, hears their stories, and slowly comes to realize that below his gilded aristocratic world, yet invisible to it, is a much larger world of cruelty, injustice and suffering. Story after story he hears and even sees people chained without cause, beaten without cause, immured in dungeons for life without cause, and a twelve-year-old boy sleeping in a lake of human dung from an overflowing latrine because there is no other place on the prison floor, but clinging in a vain search for love to the leg of the man next to him, until the book achieves the bizarre intensity of a horrific fever dream.

Nekhlyudov decides to give up his property and pass ownership on to his peasants, leaving them to argue over the different ways in which they can organise the estate, and he follows Katyusha into exile, planning on marrying her. On their long journey into Siberia, she falls in love with another man, and Nekhludov gives his blessing and still chooses to live as part of the penal community, seeking redemption.

== Reception and criticism ==
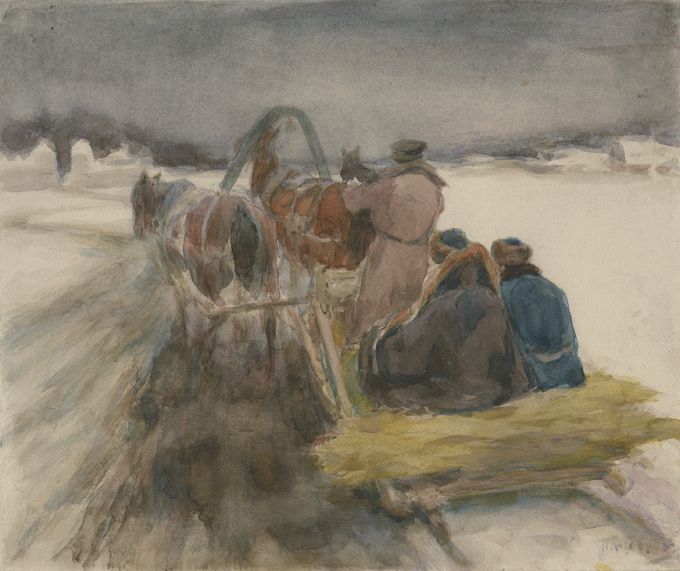
An illustration by Leonid Pasternak.

The book was eagerly awaited. "How all of us rejoiced," one critic wrote on learning that Tolstoy had decided to make his first fiction in 25 years, not a short novella but a full-length novel. "May God grant that there will be more and more!" It outsold Anna Karenina and War and Peace.

Speaking of the Russian nation, William James has said: "I was especially struck by two books. Resurrection by Tolstoy and Karamasoff by Dostoevsky. To me the characters exhibited in them seem to come from another planet, where everything is different, and better. They have landed on earth by accident and are irritated by this, almost insulted. There is something childish, ingenuous in them, and one is reminded of the obstinacy of an honest alchemist who believes that he is capable of discovering the 'Cause of all causes'."

Despite its early success, today Resurrection is not as famous as the works that preceded it. It is usually regarded as inferior to War and Peace and Anna Karenina, although it is still marked as a very important literary achievement and a work that helps to understand the Russian Revolution. Some writers have said that Resurrection has characters that are one-dimensional and that as a whole the book lacks Tolstoy's earlier attention to detail. By this point, Tolstoy was writing in a style that favored meaning over aesthetic quality.

Resurrection naturally forces comparison with those supreme works, War and Peace and Anna Karenina, and it must be admitted that it falls below the lofty artistic achievements of these earlier novels. However, its best things, artistically speaking, belong to the narrative method of Tolstoy's earlier fiction rather than to the compressed, direct, and stylistically unadorned manner of the later period after What Is Art? was written. In 'Resurrection' there is that same wealth of precise realistic detail which conveys the appearance of indubitable actuality to imagined situations, as well as roundness, completeness, and the vitality of life to his characters. In its enchanting setting, the account of the first pure love of Nekhlyudov and Katusha Maslova, certainly the finest section of the novel, is all compounded of that same wonderful elusive quality that transformed the girlish loves of Natasha in War and Peace into the incommunicable poetry of youthful dreams. Tolstoy never did anything more delightfully infectious in fiction than the scene of the Easter service in the village church, where the young hero and heroine, after the traditional Russian greeting "Christ is risen," exchange kisses with the carefree rapture of mingled religious exaltation and dawning affinity for each other. There is much of the old master also in Tolstoy's handling of the trial scene, in the portrayal of high society in both Moscow and Petersburg, and in the remarkably realistic treatment of the brutal march of the convicts to Siberia. In this area, however, the satirical representations of society are much less objective, and more grim and didactically purposeful than anything in War and Peace and Anna Karenina. Herein, indeed, lies the major artistic fault of Tolstoy's last full-length novel.

— Ernest Simons

Brian Aldiss calls it the greatest of Tolstoy's novels.

Kenji Mizoguchi said, "[a]ll melodrama is based on Tolstoy's Resurrection".

== Adaptations ==
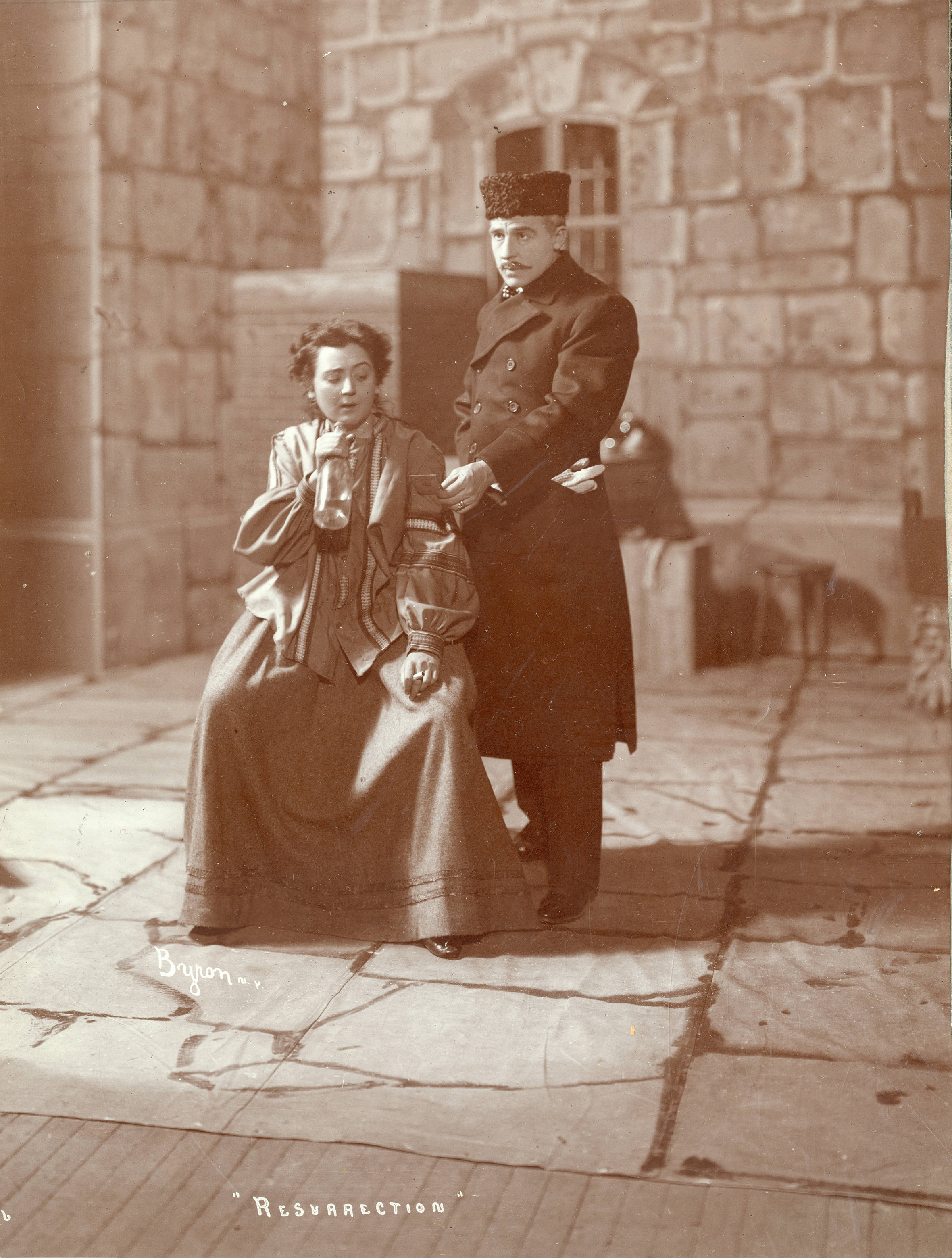
Blanche Walsh and Joseph Haworth in a 1904 stage production of Resurrection that toured the United States.

Operatic adaptations of the novel include Risurrezione (1904) by Italian composer Franco Alfano, Vzkriesenie (1960) by Slovak composer Ján Cikker, and Resurrection by American composer Tod Machover. In late 1940–early 1941, Dmitri Shostakovich worked on an operatic realization entitled Katyusha Maslova, adapted by Anatoly Mariengof, but never developed it beyond sketches. French composer Albert Roussel's 1903 tone poem Résurrection is inspired by the novel.

Additionally, various film adaptations have been made, including the Russian film Katyusha Maslova by director Pyotr Chardynin (1915, the first film role of Natalya Lisenko); a 1937 Japanese film by Kenji Mizoguchi, The Straits of Love and Hate (愛怨峡, Aien kyō); the 1944 Italian film Resurrection; a 1949 Chinese film version entitled "蕩婦心" (A Forgotten Woman) starring Bai Guang; and a 1960 Russian film, directed by Mikhail Shveitser with Yevgeny Matveyev, Tamara Semina and Pavel Massalsky. The best-known film version, however, is Samuel Goldwyn's 1934 English-language film We Live Again, starring Fredric March and Anna Sten, and directed by Rouben Mamoulian.

The Spanish director Alberto Gonzalez Vergel released his TV film Resureccion in 1966. The 1968 BBC mini-series Resurrection was rebroadcast in the US on Masterpiece Theatre. The Italian directors Paolo and Vittorio Taviani released their TV film Resurrezione in 2001.

An Indian-Bengali film adaptation titled "জীবন জিজ্ঞাসা" (Jibon Jiggasha) was released in 1971, directed by Piyush Bose and starring Uttam Kumar and Supriya Chowdhury. The 1973 Indian movie Barkha Bahar was also based on this novel.

Japan's all-female musical theater group Takarazuka Revue adopted the novel into musical twice. First in 1962 as "カチューシャ物語" (Katyusha's Story), performed by Star Troupe starring Yachiyo Kasugano; and in 2012 as "復活 －恋が終わり、愛が残った－" (Resurrection – Love Remains After the Affair Ends) performed by Flower Troupe starring Tomu Ranju. The plot Takarazuka Revue adapted follows more closely to We Live Again than the book.

The novel was adapted for Australian radio in 1947 with an award winning performance by Peter Finch in the lead.

BBC Radio 4 broadcast a two-part adaptation by Robert Forrest of the novel on 31 December 2006 and 7 January 2007, with the cast including Katherine Igoe as Katerina, Richard Dillane as Prince Dmitri, Vivienne Dixon as Lydia and Joanna Tope as Vera.

== In popular culture ==
In the show Mr. Robot, Resurrection is a frequent motif. It is the favorite book of the character Mr. Robot, and he is regularly seen holding it. The tie-in book, Red Wheelbarrow, features a torn-out page from the opening of Chapter XIV of Resurrection. The season 4 episode "eXit" features a floppy disk hidden in a copy of Resurrection that is also labelled "eXit" and which Elliot Alderson uses to try to shut down the machine built by Whiterose.

== See also ==
- After the Ball (short story)
- Hadji Murat (novel)
- The Living Corpse
- Leo Tolstoy bibliography
- Fallen woman
