= Jolana Fogašová =

Slovak singer

Jolana Fogašová (born September 12, 1971) is a Slovak opera singer with the voice type of soprano and mezzo-soprano.

She studied voice at the Bratislava Conservatory (1986–1990) and at the Academy of Performing Arts in Bratislava under the tutelage of Viktória Stracenská (1990–1994). Between 2002 and 2006 she studied there for a doctorate. She also attended voice master classes given by Carlo Bergonzi in Sienna, received a scholarship from the Club of Wiener Competition.

Since 1993 Fogašová has been a permanent guest of the Slovak National Theatre Opera, and also collaborated with Vienna Symphony, Munich Philharmonic, Orchestre Philharmonique de Radio France, Slovak Philharmonic Orchestra, and the Mozarteum Orchestra of Salzburg among others. She is currently a permanent guest of the Czech National Theatre. Some of the roles she has created on stage are Dorabella (Mozart: Così fan tutte), Donna Elvira (Mozart: Don Giovanni), Amneris (Verdi: Aida), and the title role in Georges Bizet's Carmen among others.

In cooperation with the Slovak Philharmonic Orchestra and conductor Rastislav Stur, she recorded a CD of arias (2000) and a CD entitled Lullabies, and with the conductor Gérard Korsten Weber's opera Euryanthe (2003).

In 2026, she was appointed associate professor at the Academy of Performing Arts in Bratislava.

== Sources ==
- Slovak National Theatre, Jolana Fogašová, Korzár, June 12, 2007
- Tomáschová, Andrea, Jolana Fogašová: Za všetko krásne musí človek platiť
- Dvořáková, Helena, Fogašová: Opera otvára ľudskú dušu, Pravda, 9 July 2007
