= Evgeni Irshai =

Slovak composer

Evgeni Irshai (Slovak transcription Jevgenij Iršai; born 15 January 1951) is a Slovak composer.

== Biography ==
Irshai was born on 15 January 1951 in Leningrad. From 1969 to 1975, he studied at the Conservatory in Leningrad. He taught piano and composition at the special music school attached to the conservatory from 1971 to 1991. In 1991, he moved to Slovakia and began to work with the theatre and Conservatoire at Banská Bystrica. There he was a rehearsal pianist at the State Opera from 1991 to 1992 and taught composition and piano at the Ján Levoslav Bella Conservatory from 1992 to 1996. From 1996 to 2008 he lectured at the Department of Music and Aesthetics of Matej Bel University. Since 2001 he has been a teacher at the Academy of Performing Arts in Bratislava, where he was appointed Professor in 2010. He has been a member of the Russian Composers Union since 1979, the Slovak Composers Union since 1993 and the Union of Ukrainian Composers since 2001.

Irshai's compositions include chamber and orchestral music, including a number of concertante works. Amongst the latter are Ma'ariv for cello and string orchestra (2013), a meditation on a Jewish prayer. He received the Ján Levoslav Bella Prize in 2001 for Hard Shabes and the Dezider Zador Award in Ukraine in 2008 for Sonata del grato.
