= Krútňava =

Krútňava (abroad staged as The Whirlpool or Katrena after the main female role) is an opera in six scenes by Eugen Suchoň written in the 1940s to a libretto by the composer and Štefan Hoza, based on a novella, Za vyšným mlynom (Beyond the Upper Mill) by Milo Urban. The opera was premiered at the Slovak National Theatre, Bratislava, on 10 December 1949.

== Background ==
Suchoň was invited in 1940 to write an opera for the Slovak National Theatre. In 1941 he read Urban's novella Beyond the Upper Mill, a story of love and murder set in the Slovak countryside in the years after World War I, which immediately inspired him. Urban himself however refused to collaborate on the libretto, writing in 1958 that the dramatization risked losing some of the ambiguities he had deliberately created in the book (e.g. the paternity of the heroine's baby).

Suchoň's original conception was to write the opera using two different styles - a quasi-impressionist style to accompany the thoughts of the characters, and a more realistic, nationalist style to accompany external events. Traces of this dualism remain in the score, although Suchoň realised his original ideas were impractical.

Although the premiere was successful, the governing Slovak Communist Party insisted that the original ending be changed to make it more 'optimistic'. Other serious changes were forced on the composer, involving dismantling the very important 'framework' to the opera which posited the story as the result of a wager between the Poet and his Double (spoken roles), and, inevitably, the toning down of any references to Christianity. At first Suchoň refused to make any alterations; the opera was withdrawn from the repertoire. Pressure from his musical colleagues, who realised the importance of the work, induced him to change his mind, and this 'revised version' was performed in Czechoslovakia and abroad in the 1950s, the original ending only being restored in 1963. Complete reconstruction of the original, including the participation of the Poet and his Double, had to await the composer's centenary in 2008, when Suchoň's work as originally conceived was performed in Banská Bystrica.

== Roles ==
Role	voice type	Premiere cast,10 December 1949 (Conductor: Ladislav Holoubek)
Old Štelina	bass	František Zvarík
Ondrej Zimoň	tenor	Štefan Hoza
Katrena	soprano	Margita Česányiová
Zimoň	baritone	
Zimoňka	mezzo-soprano	
Zalčíčka	soprano	

== Précis ==
=== Prelude ===
The original version, reconstituted in 2008 (see above) opens with a dialogue between the Poet and his Double. The Double maintains that base human nature will always triumph over conscience. He makes a wager with the poet to write a play in which it will be seen how things turn out.

=== Scene 1 ===
Jan Štelina is found dead in the woods. The previous night he had been with Katrena. Štelina's father accuses her of his son's death.

=== Scene 2 ===
The police come to investigate the murder but find nothing. Katrena's aunts persuade her that she should think of marrying now that Jan is dead, and propose Ondrej, who has always wanted her. Old Štelina says she would be better off living alone, and vows to continue his own investigations.

=== Scene 3 ===
Against her will Katrena marries Ondrej in a full Slovak traditional wedding. At the ceremony Štelina again rebukes Katrena, inciting the fury of Ondrej.

=== Scene 4 ===
A year later. Katrena has given birth to a boy, but Ondrej is becoming increasingly erratic, drinking and beating her. She confesses to old Štelina that Jan was her only true love. Katrena's neighbours hint that the baby looks more like someone else than Ondrej. In a rage, Ondrej stalks out to the forest.

=== Scene 5 ===
This scene is subtitled Catharsis by the composer. In the woods the drunken Ondrej has a vision of the dead Jan and is moved to confess. In the original version, the Double tries to persuade him (in an unusual duet between tenor and spoken voice) that there is no point in giving himself up as no-one knows about the crime; however Ondrej resists this temptation. In the 'Communist' version after an internal struggle, Ondrej confesses to an unseen presence that he was Jan's murderer.

=== Scene 6 ===
Easter. A shot is heard during the celebrations; the old shepherd is waving the gun he has found, which he saw Ondrej burying. Ondrej confesses; as the police take him away, Katrena assures him the baby is his. In the original version Old Štelina is reconciled to the situation and shows that his concern is to assist Katrena to bring up the child. The chorus sings of the powers of love and song (vindicating the views of the Poet).

In the 'Communist Party' version, the baby is asserted to be Jan's and is given to Old Štelina to raise. In the 1960s version Old Štelina's dreams of claiming the child are shattered; he vows revenge on Ondrej. The final chorus is a hymn to justice and the restoration of natural order.

== Discography ==
- 1953, Supraphon (LPV 151/153) Štefan Hoza, Margita Česányiová, František Zvarík, Koloman Adamkovič, Olga Hanáková, Janka Gabčová, Helena Bartošová, Zita Frešová-Hudcová, Nina Hazuchová, Anna Hornungová-Martvoňová, ) Janko Blaho, Jozef Hrabovský, Václav Nouzovský, Zdeněk Ruth-Markov, Anna Marcineková, Jozef Pekár, Tatjana Puškarová, Karol Sekyra. Chorus and orchestra of the Slovak National Theatre, conducted by Zdeněk Chalabala
- 1972, Opus (1973). Milan Kopačka, Gabriela Beňačková, Ondrej Malachovský, Juraj Oniščenko, Olga Hanáková, Jaroslava Sedlářová, Ľuba Baricová, Anna Kalabová-Peňašková, Nina Hazuchová, Anna Martvoňová, Pavol Gábor, Juraj Martvoň, Václav Nouzovský, Stanislav Beňačka, Anna Marcineková, Jozef Ábel, Marta Meierová. Chorus and orchestra of the Slovak National Theatre, conducted by Tibor Frešo
- 1988, Opus/Campion (1989/90). (Reissued 2008 Opus – 91 0101-2) Peter Dvorský, Gabriela Beňačková, Ondrej Malachovský, Vladimír Kubovčík, Alžběta Michálková, Jaroslava Sedlářová, Olga Hanáková, Eva Antolicová, Ľuba Baricová, Jana Valášková, Josef Kundlák, Juraj Martvoň, Peter Mikuláš, Stanislav Beňačka, Alžbeta Kubánková, Ľudovít Ludha, Anna Martvoňová, Jan Valentík. Slovak Philharmonic, Ondrej Lenárd

== Sources ==
- Danica Štilicha-Suchoňová and Igor Vajda, Eugen Suchoň, Bratislava, 2008. ISBN 80-88884-07-1
- Krútňava, Slovak Wikipedia
