= Redemption (radio play) =

1947 Australian radio play

Redemption is a 1947 Australian radio play based on the novel by Leo Tolstoy. It starred Peter Finch whose performance earned him the 1947 Macquarie Award for the Best Performance by a Male Actor on Radio. (Finch had also won this award the previous year.)

The play was originally known as The Living Corpses.

It was one of a series of radio plays Finch appeared in around this time adapted from Russian novels other being Such Men are Dangerous and Crime and Punishment.

Reviewing a repeat in 1950 the Brisbane Sunday Mail said "It might just as well have been Donald Ducks' houseparty for all the conviction it carried. The main artery must have been severed when they were cutting it up for radio."

== Premise ==
"Unhappy marriages and their dissolution are an ever-present problem in society. The religious and legal conditions in 19th Century Russia made divorce even more tragic than if. is today, as will be demonstrated by this play. The central character, Fedya Protasov, is an idealist and cannot con form to conventional life. He is separated from his wife and drifts into a life of weakness, drunkenness and dissipation."

== Cast ==
- Peter Finch
- Aileen Britton
- Hilda Scurr
- Nigel Lovell
- Lyn Murphy
- Betty Lucas
- Tom Farley
- Harry Howlett
