= Prešov Regional Museum =

Museum in Prešov, Slovakia

- Krajské múzeum v Prešove

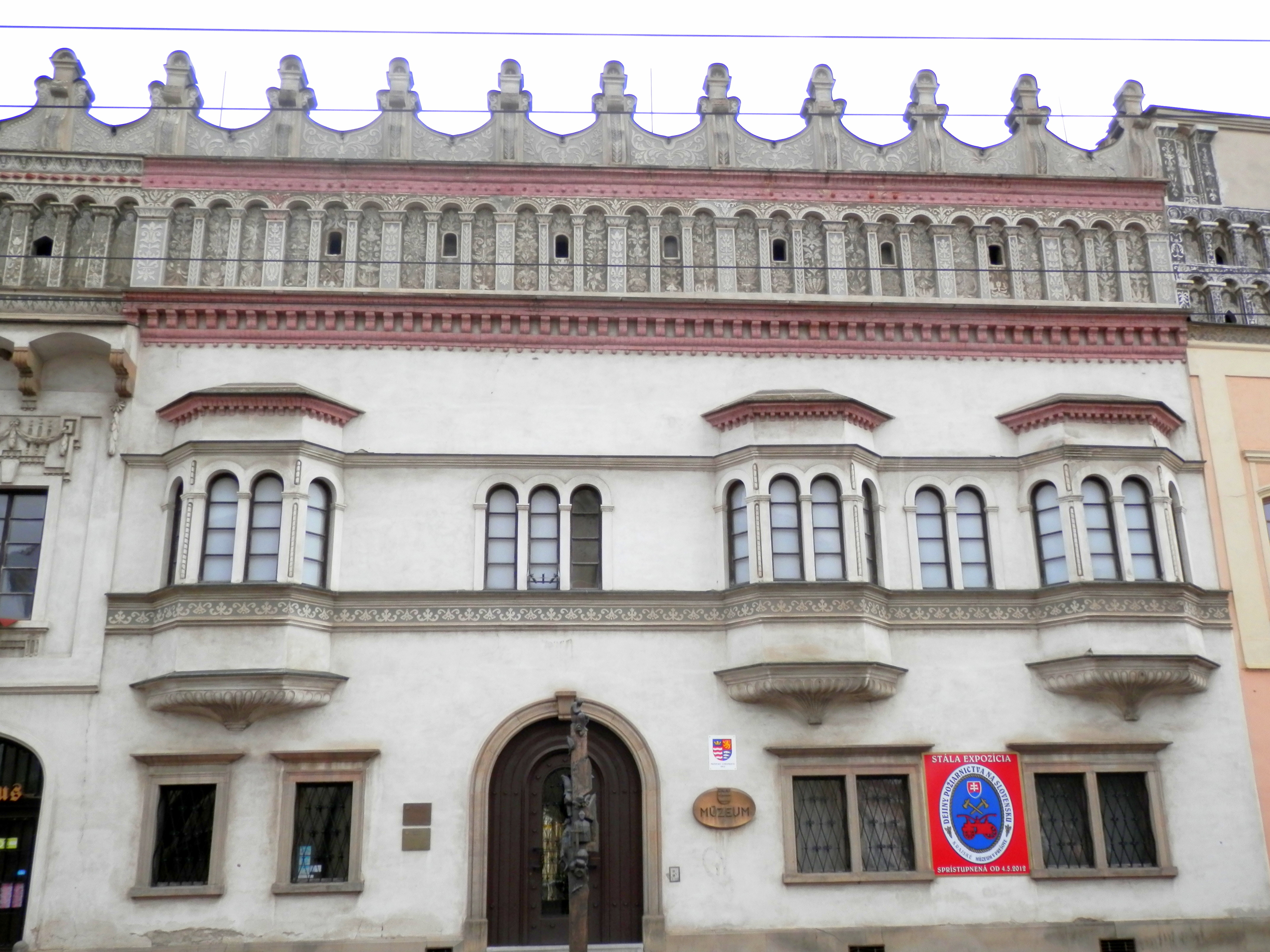
- Established: 1956
- Location: Prešov, Slovakia
- Coordinates: 48.9982°N 21.2407°E

The Prešov Regional Museum (Slovak: Krajské múzeum v Prešove) is a museum in Prešov, Slovakia. It has been located in the premises of the Rákoczi Palace since 1956, and its contents and name have gradually changed. It was originally established as a city museum on the occasion of the 700th anniversary of the written mention in 1947 in the "Kumšt" building. Currently, its buildings house historical exhibitions a view of the historical development of the city and the region and traditional folk culture. The museum is affiliated with the city of Prešov as of 2024.

The museum has been directed by Ľuboš Olejník since 2020.

== History ==
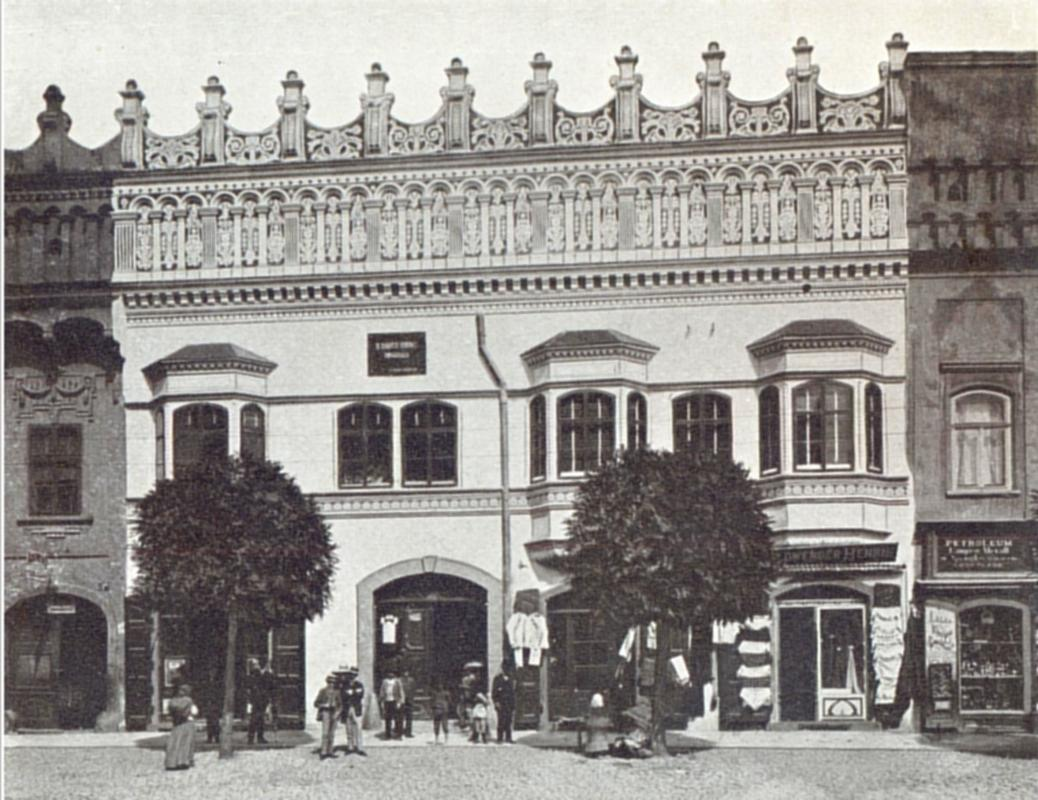
The museum building in 1909

The museum was originally built in the premises of the Rákoci Palace, which was built in the first quarter of the 17th century by combining and rebuilding several medieval burgher houses in the Renaissance style for the Prince of Transylvania, Sigismund Rákoczi. Its management did not take place until 1945 despite there being multiple attempts to establish a museum in Prešov before the First World War and interwar period. Prešov Regional Museum was established as a city museum, but in 1950 it acquired the status of a Regional Museum. The building underwent several reconstructions in the 17th and 19th centuries. It was renovated between 1950 and 1956 and has been used as a museum since. In January 2017, the Prešov Museum became the main museum of the region after merging with the Museum of Local History in Hanušovce nad Topľou.

== Findings ==
Historical, archaeological, ethnographic, art-historical, and natural science collections are preserved and presented by the museum. They are the result of collection-building work in an area of the Šariš region and in wider Slovak relations. The Prešov Museum has registered over 115,312 collection items since 2009. Of these, 28,241 are natural science, 76,556 are social science, and 11,089 are technical.

== Exhibitions ==
The History of Firefighting in Slovakia exhibition was opened on October 12, 1978. It featured items from the personal collection of Pavel Košík, who served as the commander of volunteer firefighters in Prešov and was a collector of related artifacts. Following its closure in 2009, the exhibition underwent restoration and was reopened in 2012. In 2014, the exhibition of Inanimate nature was opened, also contained several paleontological finds from the surroundings of Prešov.

The permanent exhibitions in the Prešov Regional Museum are;

- Inanimate nature
- 9th to the 19th century of Prešov
- Historical furniture and interior accessories
- Historical weapons
- Historical clocks
- History of the crown currency
- Historical farming equipment in Šariš
- History of firefighting in Slovakia
- Exhibitions of Mikuláš Moyzes

== See also ==
- List of museums in Slovakia
