= Polish Blood =

- Directed by: Karel Lamač
- Written by: Henry Koster; Peter Ort; Leo Stein (operetta, 1913); Alexander Pushkin (short story, 1830)
- Produced by: Robert Leistenschneider; Carl Lamac; Anny Ondra
- Starring: Anny Ondra; Hans Moser; Iván Petrovich
- Cinematography: Otto Heller; Otto Martini
- Edited by: Ella Ensink
- Music by: Oskar Nedbal
- Production companies: Elektra Filmfabriken; Ondra-Lamac-Film
- Distributed by: Lux Film (Austria)
- Release dates: 24 October 1934; 21 December 1934 (Czech version)
- Countries: Austria; Czechoslovakia; Germany
- Language: German

Polish Blood (German: Polenblut, Czech: Polská krev) is a 1934 black and white musical film directed by Karel Lamač and starring Anny Ondra. It is an operetta film, based on the libretto of the operetta Polenblut by the Austrian playwright Leo Stein. The film's sets were designed by art directors Bohumil Hes and Štěpán Kopecký.

Two version of the film with different casts exist - A German version titled Polenblut and a Czech version titled Polská krev.

== Cast ==
=== German version ===
- Anny Ondra as Helena Zaremba
- Hans Moser as Jan Zaremba
- Iván Petrovich as Count Bolko Baransky
- Margarete Kupfer as Jadwiga Kwasińska
- Hilde Hildebrand as Wanda Kwasińska
- Rudolf Carl as Bronio von Popiel
- Paul Rehkopf as Dymscha
- Karl Platen as Constanty

=== Czech version ===
- Anny Ondra as Helena Zarembová
- Theodor Pištěk as Jan Zaremba
- Štefan Hoza as Count Bolko Baransky
- Růžena Šlemrová as Jadwiga Kwasińska
- Alena Frimlová as Wanda Kwasińska
- Ludvík Veverka as Bronio Popiel
- Václav Trégl as Dymša
- Alois Dvorský as Kosťa
