= Academy of Performing Arts in Bratislava =

Performing arts college in Slovakia

Coordinates: 48°08′38″N 17°06′35″E

- Vysoká škola múzických umení v Bratislave (VŠMU)
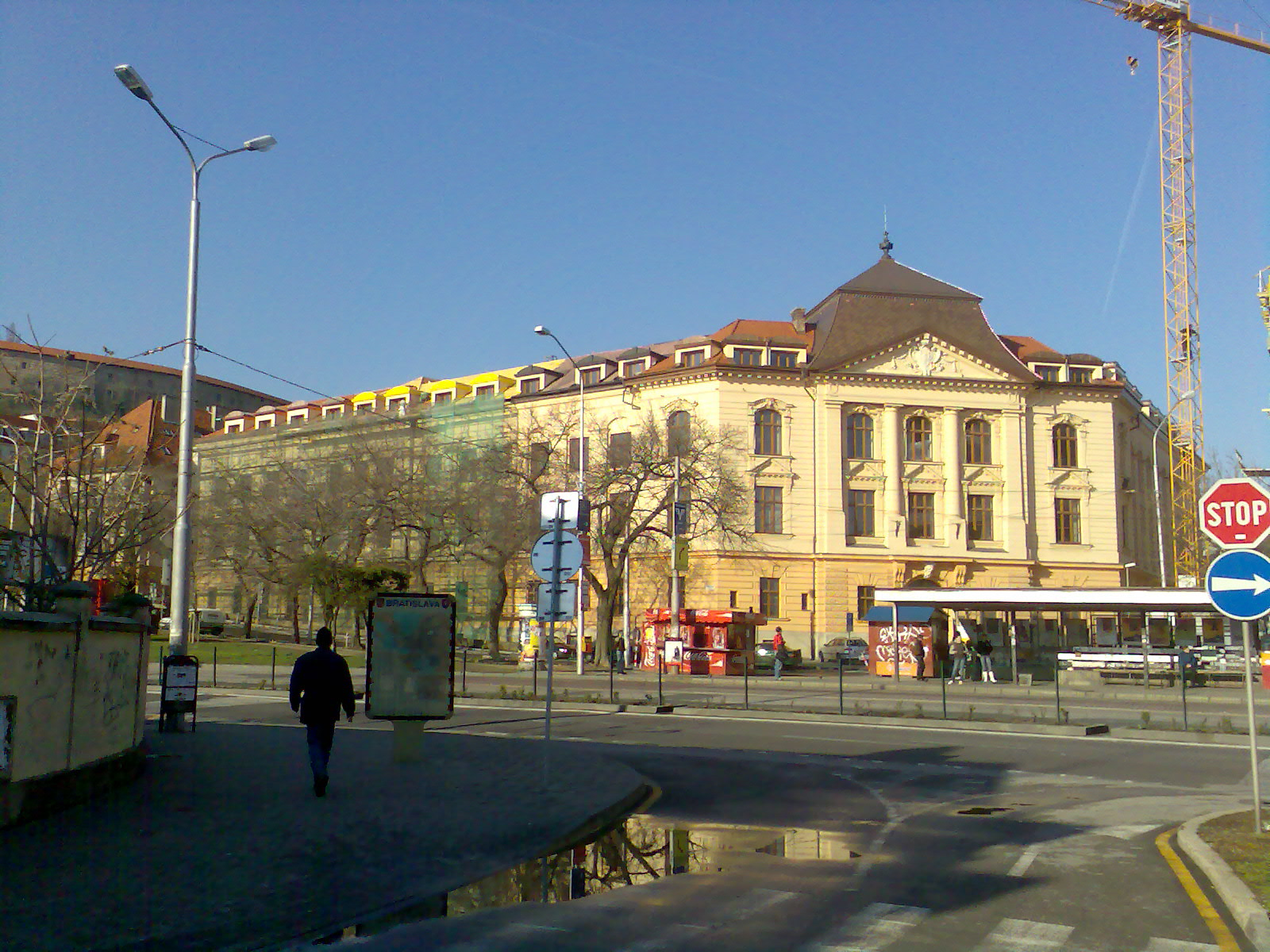
- Established: 1949
- Location: Bratislava, Slovakia
- Website: vsmu.sk

The Academy of Performing Arts in Bratislava (Slovak: Vysoká škola múzických umení v Bratislave, abbr. VŠMU) is a university founded on June 9, 1949.

The university consists of three faculties:

- Theatre Faculty (Acting, Directing, Dramaturgy, Stage and Costume Design, Puppetry, Theatre Theory, Theatre Management)
- Faculty of Film and Television (Directing, Documentary, Dramaturgy and Scriptwriting, Photography and Picture Composition, Animation, Editing, Sound Design, Production, Management and Business Studies, Film and TV Theory)
- Faculty of Music and Dance (Composition, Orchestra Conducting, Theory of Music, Voice, Opera Directing, Instrumental Playing (16 majors), Dance (6 majors))

== Notable alumni ==
- Adriana Kučerová, soprano
- Marek Maďarič, Slovak Minister of Culture
- Alexander Moyzes, composer
- Ladislav Burlas, composer, musicologist
- Ján Cikker, composer
- Jolana Fogašová, soprano
- Ľudovít Rajter, composer
- Frico Kafenda, composer
- Ivan Hrušovský, composer
- Peter Zagar, composer
- Vladimír Godár, composer
- Peter Breiner, composer, conductor
- Marek Piaček, composer
- Ľuboš Bernáth, composer
- Ladislav Slovák, conductor
- Marián Lejava, composer, conductor
- Pavol Gábor, tenor
- Štefan Hoza, tenor
- Bohdan Warchal, violinist
- Miroslav Dvorský, tenor
- Zuzana Piussi aka Susan Piussi, filmmaker
- Juraj Nvota, theatre and film director
- Martin Šulík, film director
- Emília Vášáryová, actress
- Tatiana Pauhofová, actress
- Martin Kollar, photographer
- Sylvia Čápová-Vizváry, pianist
- Kristína Mravcová, actress
- Lucia Popp, soprano
- Edita Gruberová, soprano
- Božidara Turzonovová, actress
- Lucia Kašová, director
