= Alexander Moyzes =

Slovak composer (1906–1984)

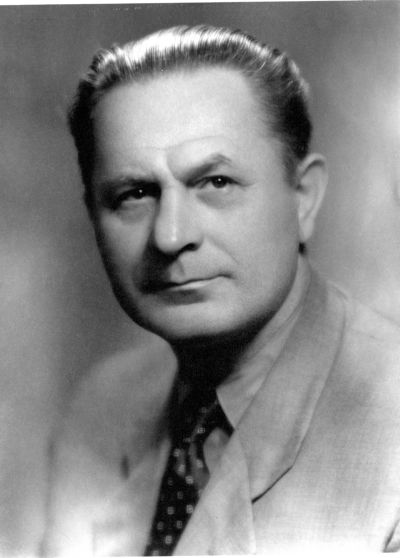
- Slovak musical composer and pedagogue
- Born: 4 September 1906; Kláštor pod Znievom, Austro-Hungarian Empire
- Died: 20 November 1984 (aged 78); Bratislava, Czechoslovakia

Alexander Moyzes (4 September 1906 – 20 November 1984) was a Slovak neoromantic composer.

== Biography ==
Moyzes was born into a musical family in 1906 at Kláštor pod Znievom, Austro-Hungarian Empire. His father was the composer and educator Mikuláš Moyzes. After earlier technical studies, in 1925 he entered the Prague Conservatory, where he studied organ, conducting and composition. He graduated in 1929 and went on to study in the master class of Vítězslav Novák, from which he graduated in the following year with his Overture for Orchestra, Opus 10. It was Novák who directed his attention to Slovak music, the source of his inspiration.

In 1929, Moyzes was appointed to the teaching staff of the Music and Drama Academy for Slovakia in Bratislava. He became professor of composition at the Bratislava Conservatory in 1941 and spent a number of years as principal music advisor to Radio Bratislava, until compelled to resign in 1948. On its foundation he was appointed professor of composition at the Bratislava Music Academy, where he taught no less than three generations of Slovak composers. See: List of music students by teacher: K to M#Alexander Moyzes. He headed the Academy as Rector from 1965 until 1971, and over the years undertook many important functions in the musical life of his country. He died in Bratislava.

With Eugen Suchoň and Ján Cikker, Alexander Moyzes is considered one of the three leading composers of his generation in Slovakia. He succeeded in creating a style of composition that was thoroughly Slovak in inspiration, yet nevertheless took account of contemporary trends in European music, a synthesis that he was to consolidate in his later years.

== Works ==
=== Orchestra ===
- Down the River Váh, Op. 26 (1935)
- Pohronie Dances, Op. 43 (1950)
- Gemer Dances, Op. 51 (1956)
- Violin Concerto, Op. 53
- Symphony No. 1 in D major, Op. 31 (1929, rev. 1937)
- Symphony No. 2 in A minor, Op. 16 (1932)
- Symphony No. 3 in B flat major, Op. 18 (1942)
- Symphony No. 4 in E flat major, Op. 38 (1947, rev. 1957)
- Symphony No. 5 in F major, Op. 39 (1947–48)
- Symphony No. 6 in E major, Op. 44 (1951)
- Symphony No. 7, Op. 50 (1954–55)
- Flute Concerto, Op. 61
- Symphony No. 8, Op. 64 (1968–69)
- Symphony No. 9, Op. 69 (1971)
- Symphony No. 10, Op. 77 (1977–78)
- Symphony No. 11, Op. 79
- Symphony No. 12, Op. 83

=== Chamber ===
- Four String Quartets (Op. 8, 66, 83 and without opus number)

=== Piano ===
- Jazz Sonata for two pianos, op. 14

== Sources ==
Zvara, Vladimir (2001). "Moyzes, Alexander". In Macy, L. (ed.). Grove Music Online.
