= Mikuláš Moyzes =

Slovak musician

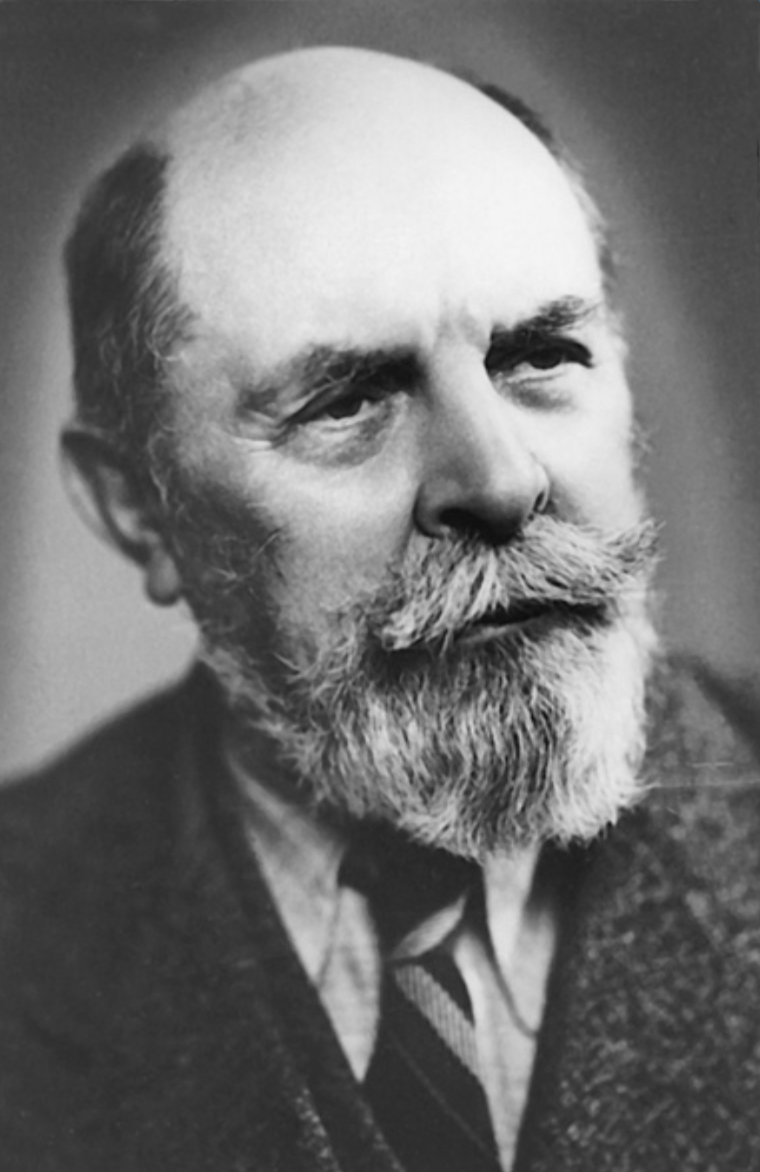
- Moyzes in 1932
- Born: December 4, 1872; Zvolenská Slatina, Hungary (now Slovakia)
- Died: April 2, 1944 (aged 71); Prešov, Slovakia
- Spouse: Mária Anna Witteková
- Children: Alexander Moyzes
- Parents: František Moyzes (father); Paulína Slobodníková (mother)

Mikuláš Moyzes (born December 6, 1872; died April 2, 1944) was a Slovak composer, organist and pedagogue.

As a young man, he worked in various parts of Transleithania, in what is now Slovakia, Hungary and Romania. At the age of twenty he became an organist in Eger and two years later an organist and music teacher in Oradea. Later he became a professor of music at the teacher training institute in Čurgov, in Kláštor pod Znievom and in Prešov. He was active in the cultural and social sphere of Prešov for 36 years, from his arrival in 1908 until his death in 1944. A marble monument in the shape of a lyre was erected in his memory in Prešov.

He is considered a direct predecessor of Slovak musical modernity.

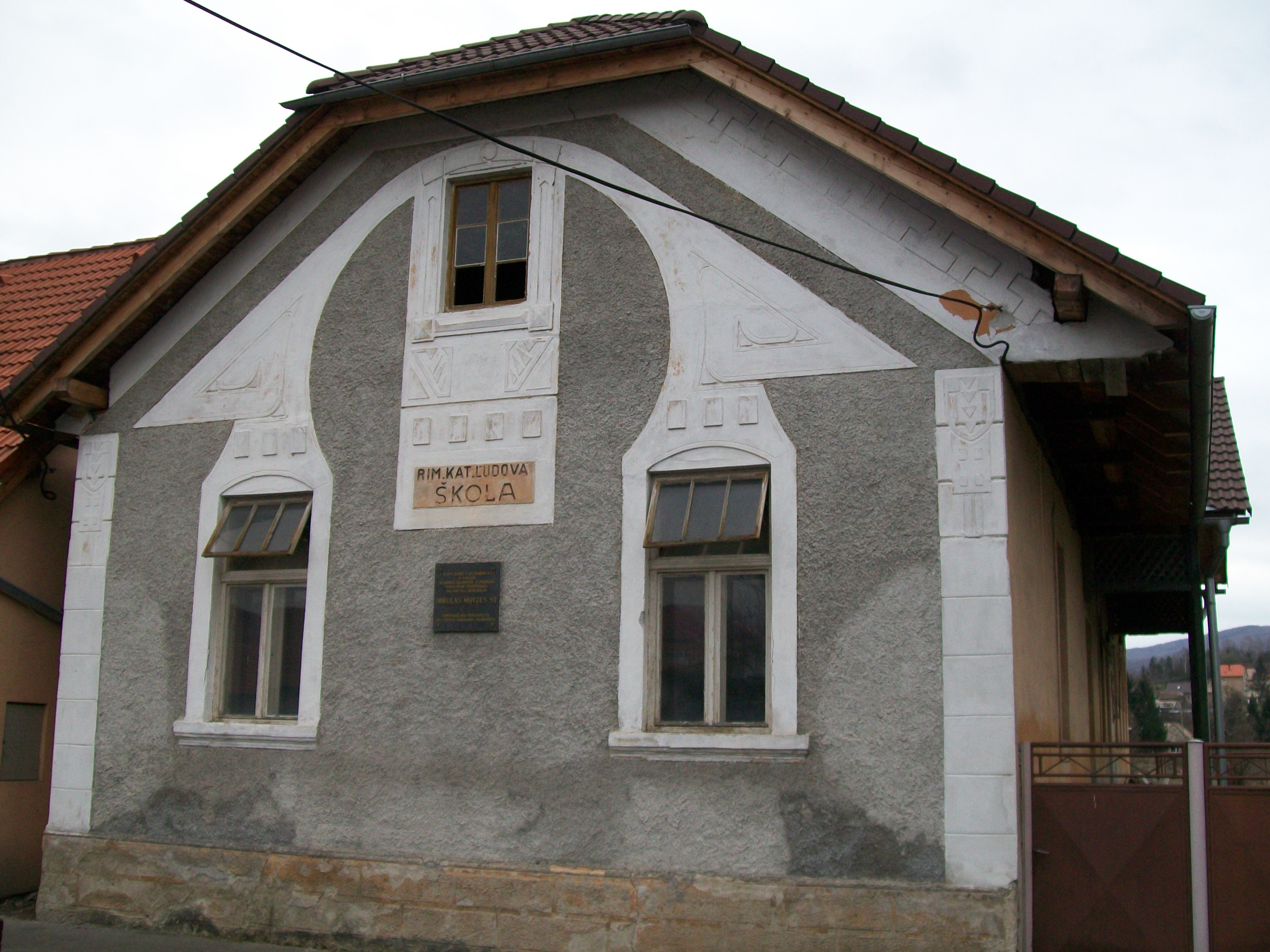
The Roman Catholic school in the village of Zvolenská Slatina, where Moyzes was born in 1872.

== Life ==
Moyzes was born into a family of teachers in Zvolenská Slatina in 1872. At the age of three, he relocated with his family to Divín, where he was first introduced to music. Later on, he completed his high school education in Banská Bystrica and Revúcá, and upon finishing high school, he opted for a teacher training institute in Kláštor pod Znievom.

In 1895, the age of twenty, he became an organist in Eger. In 1908, Moyzes moved to Prešov to study at the State Teachers' Institute (Učiteľská preparandia). There, he started to create larger musical works. The Small Singing Schools and the piano collections titled Our Youth and Our Children gained popularity, which Moyzes created as supplementary material for the Bayer School. Upon the birth of his son Alexander, he composed the Missa solemnis in C major. Furthermore, he created five melodramas, which is quite uncommon in the works of composers from that era.

At the Hungarian Girls' Teachers' Institute, he taught Slovak for an extended period alongside singing and music. In 1919, Moyzes was appointed as the inaugural Slovak director of the State Teachers' Institute in Prešov and took on the role of chairman of the administrative committee for Šariš County and Prešov. The following year, in 1920, he played a pivotal role as a founding member of the Local Department of Matica Slovenská.

== Family ==
Moyzes was married to Mária Anna Witteková, who was German and originally from Vršac in Vojvodina. She was a soprano and would perform as an opera singer at the Košice Theatre and the Black Eagle building in Prešov. Moyzes also had a son called Alexander Moyzes, who was also a composer.

== Legacy ==
=== Bratislava statue ===
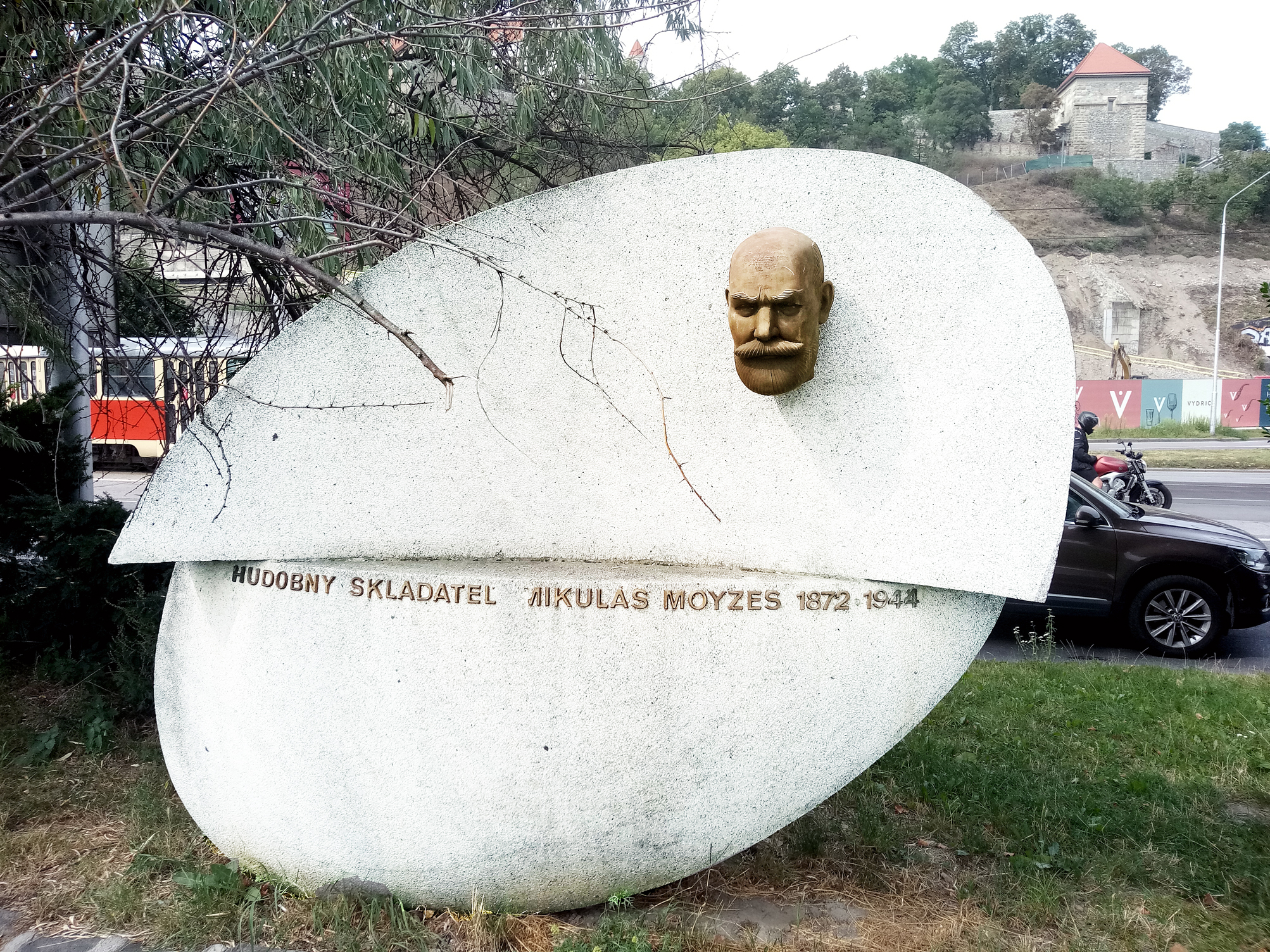
The monument in 2020.

A monument to Moyzes made of bronze was unveiled in 1972 in the Janko Kráľ Park in Bratislava. Parts were stolen in 1989, and later the pedestal of the monument was also damaged. After renovation in 2014, the statue was installed on the Embankment of Arm. Gen. Ludvík Svoboda. The monument features the composer's bust, now made of artificial material. The pedestal in the is made from light gray Mrákotín granite.

=== Prešov museum ===
There is an exhibition is dedicated to Moyzes in the Prešov Regional Museum, which includes his personal collection of pipes.

== Works ==
- Orchestral composition ceremonial overture Naše Slovensko
- Malá vrchovská symfónia
- Balada Ctibor
- Melodramas: Siroty, Lesná panna and Čertova rieka
