= Slovaks =

West Slavic ethnic group

Slovaks Slováci

Total population
- c. 6–7 million

Regions with significant populations
- Slovakia 4,752,547 The population is (88.6%) Slovak and (11.4%) are other European citizens
- United States: 416,047 (2022); 1,850,000 (1990 census)
- Czech Republic: 162,578 (2021 census); 200,000–400,000 (estimates)
- Canada: 68,210; (including 14,910 first generation immigrants); 100,000 (estimate)
- Germany: 64,745; 80,000 (estimate)
- Austria: 63,621 (2020); 65,000 (estimate)
- United Kingdom: 58,000; 135,000 (estimate)
- Serbia: 41,730 (2021); 40,000 (estimate)
- Hungary: 29,647 (2021); 30,000 (estimate)
- Switzerland: 20,581 (2021); 25,000 (estimate)
- Brazil: 17,200
- DenmarkNorwaySweden: 17,000 (estimated total in Scandinavian countries)
- Spain: 12,350 (2021); 15,000(estimate)
- Ireland: 10,801; 15,000 (estimate)
- Romania: 10,300 (2021 census) 13,000 (estimate)
- France: 9,768 (2017); 20,000 (estimate)
- Italy: 9,014 (2021); 20,000 (estimates)
- Netherlands: 9,000 (2022); 15,000 (estimate)
- Israel: 8,000 (2020); up to 70,000 (estimate)
- Belgium: 6,677 (2022 census); 10,000 (estimate)
- Ukraine: 6,700 (estimate)
- Australia: 4,781 (2021 census), 9,000–15,000 (estimates)
- Croatia: 3,688 (2021 census); 5,000 (estimate)

Languages
- Slovak

Religion
- Majority Roman Catholics with Minorities of Lutherans, Eastern Catholics, Eastern Orthodox, other

Related ethnic groups
- Pannonian Rusyns, other West Slavs: (Poles; Czechs; Moravians; Chodové; Silesians)

Slovaks (Slovak: Slováci [ˈslɔvaːtsi] (historical Sloveni [ˈslɔveɲi]), singular: Slovák [ˈslɔvaːk] (historical: Sloven [ˈslɔven]), feminine: Slovenka [ˈslɔveŋka], plural: Slovenky [ˈslɔveŋki]) are a West Slavic ethnic group and nation native to Slovakia. They share a common culture, ancestry, history, and speak the Slovak language.

In Slovakia, c. 4.7 million are ethnic Slovaks of 5.4 million total population. There are Slovak minorities in many neighboring countries including Austria, Croatia, Czech Republic, Hungary, Poland, Romania, Serbia and Ukraine and sizeable populations of immigrants and their descendants in Australia, Canada, France, Germany, United Kingdom and the United States among others, which are collectively referred to as the Slovak diaspora.

== Name ==
The name Slovak is derived from *Slověninъ, plural *Slověně, the old name of the Slavs (Proglas, around 863). (Note: The Slovaks and Slovenes are the only current Slavic nations that have preserved the original name. For Slovenes, the adjective is still slovenski and the feminine noun "Slovene" is still also Slovenka, but the masculine noun has since changed to Slovenec. The Slovak name for their language is slovenčina and the Slovene name for theirs is slovenščina. The Slovak term for Slovene is slovinčina; and the Slovenes call Slovak slovaščina. The name is derived from proto-Slavic form slovo "word, talk" (cf. Slovak sluch, which comes from the IE root *ḱlew-). Thus Slovaks as well as Slovenians would mean "people who speak (the same language)", i.e. people who understand each other.) The original stem has been preserved in all Slovak words except the masculine noun; the feminine noun is Slovenka, the adjective is slovenský, the language is slovenčina and the country is Slovensko. The first written mention of adjective slovenský (Slovak) is in 1294 (ad parvam arborem nystra slowenski breza ubi est meta).

The original name of Slovaks Slověninъ/Slověně was still recorded in Pressburg Latin-Czech Dictionary (the 14th century), but it changed to Slovák under the influence of Czech and Polish (around 1400). The first written mention of new form in the territory of present-day Slovakia is from Bardejov (1444, "Nicoulaus Cossibor hauptman, Nicolaus Czech et Slowak, stipendiarii supremi"). The mentions in Czech sources are older (1375 and 1385). The change is not related to the ethnogenesis of Slovaks, but exclusively to linguistic changes in the Central Slavic languages. The word Slovak was used also later as a common name for all Slavs in Czech, Polish, and also Slovak together with other forms.

In Hungarian, "Slovak" is Tót (pl: tótok), an exonym. It was originally used to refer to all Slavs including Slovenes and Croats, but eventually came to refer primarily to Slovaks. Many place names in Hungary such as Tótszentgyörgy, Tótszentmárton, and Tótkomlós still bear the name. Tóth is a common Hungarian surname.

The Slovaks have also historically been variously referred to as Slovyenyn, Slowyenyny, Sclavus, Sclavi, Slavus, Slavi, Winde, Wende, or Wenden. The final three terms are variations of the Germanic term Wends, which was historically used to refer to any Slavs living close to Germanic settlements.

== Ethnogenesis ==
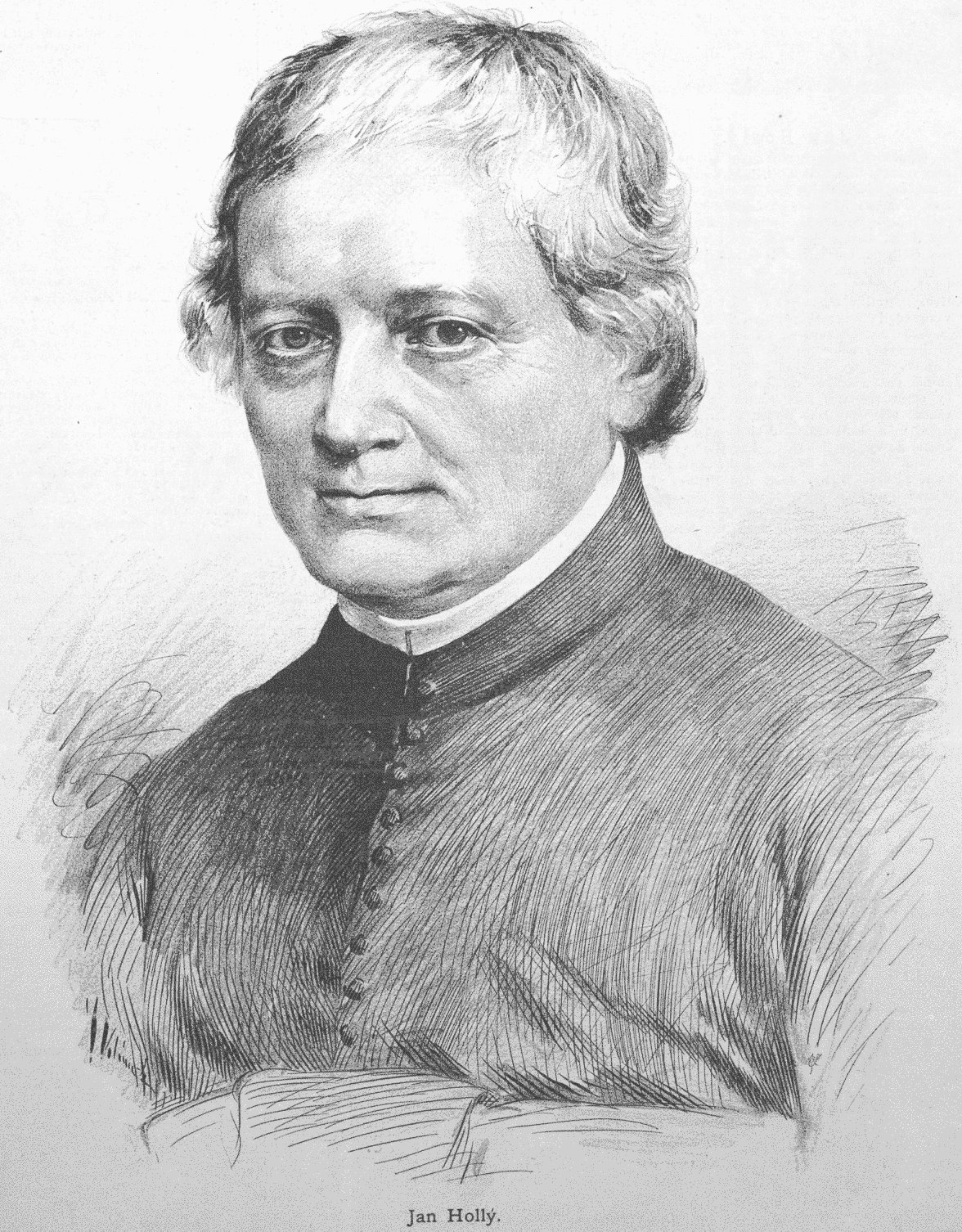
Ján Hollý (portrait from 1885)

The early Slavs came to the territory of Slovakia in several waves from the 5th and 6th centuries and were organized on a tribal level. Original tribal names are not known due to the lack of written sources before their integration into higher political units. Weakening of tribal consciousness was probably accelerated by Avars, who did not respect tribal differences in the controlled territory and motivated remaining Slavs to join and to collaborate on their defense. In the 7th century, Slavs founded a larger tribal union: Samo's empire. Regardless of Samo's empire, the integration process continued in other territories with various intensities.

The final fall of the Avar Khaganate allowed new political entities to arise. The first such political unit documented by written sources is the Principality of Nitra, one of the foundations of later common ethnic consciousness. At this stage in history it is not yet possible to assume a common identity of all ancestors of Slovaks in the neighboring eastern territories, even if it was inhabited by closely related Slavs. The Principality of Nitra became a part of Great Moravia, a common state of Moravians (Czech ancestors were joined only for a few years). The relatively short existence of Great Moravia prevented it from suppressing differences which resulted from its creation from two separate entities, and therefore a common "Slovak-Moravian" ethnic identity failed to develop. The early political integration in the territory of present-day Slovakia was, however, reflected in linguistic integration. While dialects of the early ancestors of Slovaks were divided into West Slavic (western and eastern Slovakia) and non-West Slavic (central Slovakia), between the 8th and 9th centuries both dialects merged, thus laying the foundations of a later Slovak language.

The 10th century is a milestone in the Slovak ethnogenesis. The fall of Great Moravia and further political changes supported their formation into a separate nation. At the same time, with the extinction of the Proto-Slavic language, between the 10th and 13th centuries Slovak evolved into an independent language (simultaneously with other Slavic languages). The early existence of the Kingdom of Hungary positively influenced the development of common consciousness and companionship among Slavs in the Northern Hungary, not only within boundaries of present-day Slovakia. The clear difference between Slovaks and Hungarians made adoption of a specific name unnecessary and Slovaks preserved their original name (in Latin e.g. Slavus), which was also used in communication with other Slavic peoples (Polonus, Bohemus, Ruthenus). In political terms, the medieval Slovaks were a part of the multi-ethnic political nation Natio Hungarica, together with Hungarians (or, more exactly, Magyars), Slavonians, Germans, Romanians and other ethnic groups in the Kingdom of Hungary. Since a medieval political nation did not consist of ordinary people but nobility, membership of the privileged class was necessary for all these peoples (nobiles Hungary).

Like other nations, the Slovaks began to transform into a modern nation from the 18th century under the idea of national romanticism. The modern Slovak nation is the result of radical processes of modernization within the Habsburg Empire which culminated in the middle of the 19th century. The transformation process was slowed down by conflict with Hungarian nationalism and the ethnogenesis of the Slovaks become a political question, particularly regarding their deprivation and preservation of their language and national rights. In 1722, Michal Bencsik, professor of law at the University of Trnava, published a theory that nobility and burghers of Trenčín should not have same privileges as Hungarians, because they are descendants of Svatopluk's people (inferior to Magyars). Neither Bencsik nor his Slovak opponent Ján Baltazár Magin put the continuity of settlement into serious question. Also, the first history of Slovaks written by Georgius Papanek (or Juraj Papánek), traced the roots of the Slovaks to Great Moravia in Historia gentis Slavae. De regno regibusque Slavorum... (1780) ("History of the Slovak nation: On the kingdom and kings of the Slovaks"). Papánek's work became a basis for argumentation of the Slovak national revival movement. However, the Slovak national revival not only accepted the continuity of population but also emphasized it, thus proving that Slovaks are equal citizens of the state and neither a Hungarian "unique statesmanlike gift" nor Christianization was required for the foundation of the state.

In 1876, Hungarian linguist Pál Hunfalvy published a theory about missing continuity between Slovaks and Slavs before the arrival of the Hungarians. Hunfalvy tried to prove that ancestors of Slovaks did not live in the territory of the present-day Slovakia before arrival of the old Hungarians (Magyars), but Slovaks emerged later from other Slavs who came to the Kingdom of Hungary from neighbouring countries after the 13th century. János Karácsonyi assumed that central and northern Slovakia were uninhabited (1901) and in his next work "Our historical right to the territorial integrity of our country" (1921) he claimed that the remainder of the original Slavs were assimilated by Magyars and modern Slovaks are descendants of immigrants from Upper Moravia and Oder (the population density on these territories was too low in that time and large numbers of colonists coming from these areas was not possible). The theory was then misused by inter-war Hungarian revisionists, who questioned continuity to support Hungarian claims on Slovakia. In 1982, when rich archaeological evidence proving the opposite was already available, a similar theory was published by Hungarian historian György Györffy. Györffy accepted that smaller groups of Slavs could remain in the territory of Slovakia, but stated that the Slovaks' origin was in sparse settlement of various Slavic groups strengthened by later colonization. According to Ferenc Makk, the medieval Moravians are not the ancestors of Slovaks and the majority of the Slovak people are descended from later Slavic newcomers.

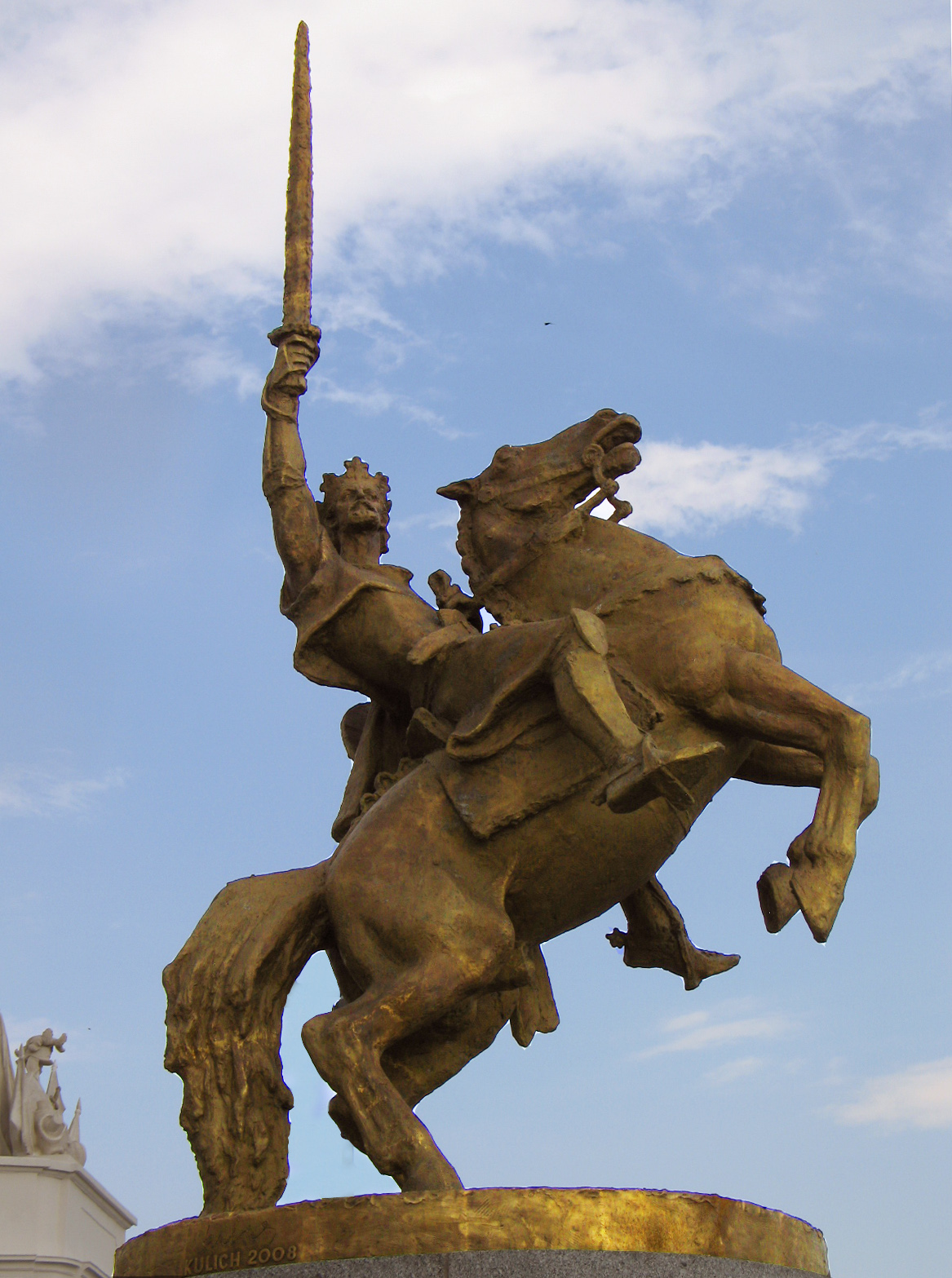
The statue of Svätopluk I

The opposite theory, supporting the supposed former common past of the Czech and Slovak nations, thus also legitimizing the creation of the united Czechoslovak nation, gained political support in inter-war Czechoslovakia. Like Karácsonyi, Czech historian Václav Chaloupecký assumed that northern and central parts of Slovakia remained uninhabited until the 13th century and that the south-western part was inhabited by Czechs. Yet, in 1946 Chaloupecký assumed that the Slovak nation emerged from neighboring Slavs and had been formed only in the 17th century. His theory about the lack of population in the greater part of Slovakia covered by forests had already been scientifically refuted by Daniel Rapant (e.g. in O starý Liptov, 1934), and was proven wrong by numerous archaeological finds (Note: For example Slavic mounds in Krasňany near Žilina, cemetery in Martin, magnate mounds in Turčianska Blatnica, Malý Čepčín and Žabokreky, settlements in Liptovský Michal, Liptovská Mara (unearthed during construction of the water dam), Vlachy, Liptovská Štiavnica, Paludza, Sokolče, Lisková, Podtureň, Prosiek, Bobrovník, Likavka – all of them from 8–10th century. (Uhlár, 1992, p. 326)) and rejected by Czechoslovak historiography. On the other hand, inter-war Slovak autonomists, opposing ethnic Czechoslovakism, dated the existence of the Slovak nation to the time of Pribina (trials to document existence of Slovaks in early Slavic era, i.e. in the time of Samo's empire, are marginal and exist outside of modern mainstream Slovak historiography).

After the dissolution of Czechoslovakia in 1993, the formation of independent Slovakia motivated interest in a particularly Slovak national identity. One reflection of this was the rejection of the common Czechoslovak national identity in favour of a purely Slovak one.

== History ==
=== Slavs of the Pannonian Basin ===
The first known Slavic states on the territory of present-day Slovakia were the Empire of Samo and the Principality of Nitra, founded sometime in the 8th century.

=== Great Moravia ===
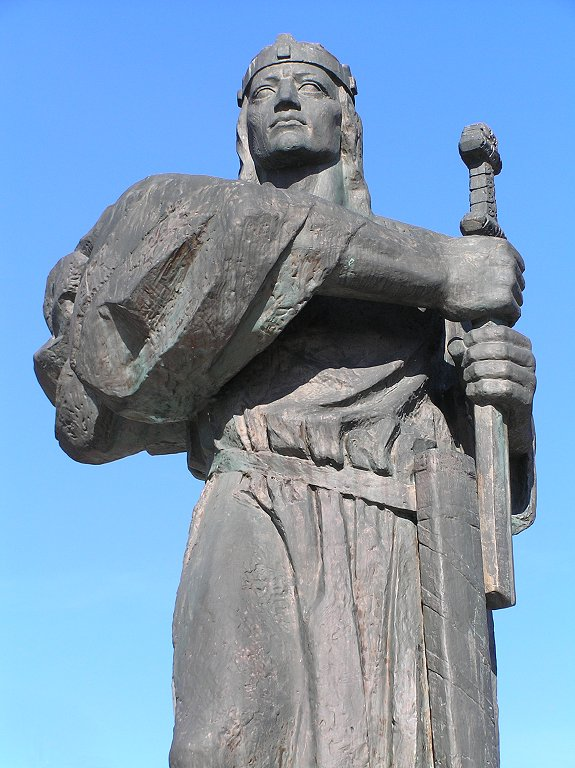
Pribina, ruler of Principality of Nitra, established and ruled the Balaton Principality from 839/840 to 861.

Great Moravia (833 – 902–907) was a Slavic state in the 9th and early 10th centuries, whose creators were the ancestors of the Czechs and Slovaks. Important developments took place at this time, including the mission of Byzantine monks Cyril and Methodius, the development of the Glagolitic alphabet (an early form of the Cyrillic script), and the use of Old Church Slavonic as the official and literary language. Its formation and rich cultural heritage have attracted somewhat more interest since the 19th century.

The original territory inhabited by the Slavic tribes included not only present-day Slovakia, but also parts of present-day Poland, southeastern Moravia and approximately the entire northern half of present-day Hungary.

=== Kingdom of Hungary ===
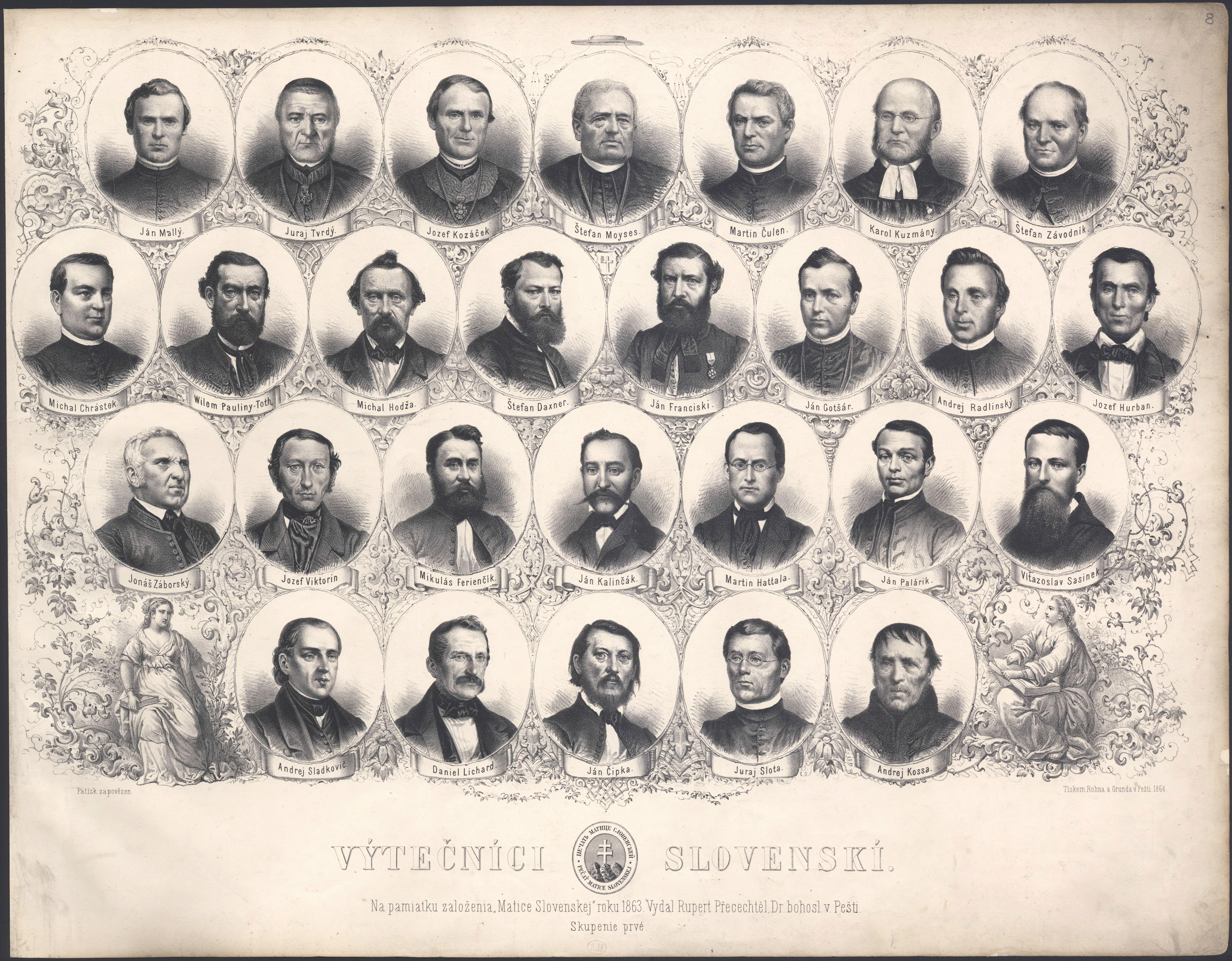
Gallery of famous Slovak people, active in different areas (history, literature, education, religion, science). Published on occasion of establishing Matica slovenská ("Slovak Foundation"), major patriotic organization. List of portraited personalities: Ján Mallý-Dusarov, Juraj Tvrdý, Jozef Kozáček, Štefan Moyzes, Martin Čulen, Karol Kuzmány, Štefan Závodník, Michal Chrástek, Viliam Pauliny-Tóth, Michal Miloslav Hodža, Štefan Marko Daxner, Ján Francisci-Rimavský, Ján Gotčár, Andrej Ľudovít Radlinský, Jozef Miloslav Hurban, Jonáš Záborský, Jozef Karol Viktorin, Mikuláš Štefan Ferienčík, Ján Kalinčiak, Martin Hattala, Ján Palárik, František Víťazoslav Sasinek, Andrej Sládkovič, Daniel Gabriel Lichard, Ján Čipka, Juraj Slota, Andrej Kossa

The territory of present-day Slovakia was split in two parts between the Kingdom of Hungary (under Hungarian rule gradually from 907 to the early 14th century) to Upper Hungary and Royal Hungary (under the Habsburgs from 1527 – 1848 (see also Hungarian Revolution of 1848)) until the formation of Czechoslovakia in 1918. However, according to other historians, from 895 to 902, the whole area of the present-day Slovakia became part of the rising Principality of Hungary, and became (without gradation) part of the Kingdom of Hungary a century later. A separate entity called Nitra Frontier Duchy, existed at this time within the Kingdom of Hungary. This duchy was abolished in 1107. The territory inhabited by the Slovaks in present-day Hungary was gradually reduced.

When most of Hungary was conquered by the Ottoman Empire in 1541 (see Ottoman Hungary), the territory of present-day Slovakia became the new center of the reduced kingdom that remained under Hungarian, and later Habsburg rule, officially called Royal Hungary. Some Croats settled around and in present-day Bratislava for similar reasons. Also, many Germans settled in the Kingdom of Hungary, especially in the towns, as work-seeking colonists and mining experts from the 13th to the 15th century. Jews and Gypsies also formed significant populations within the territory. During the period, most of present-day Slovakia was part of Habsburg rule, but Ottoman ruled southern and southeasternmost parts of it.

After the Ottoman Empire was forced to retreat from present-day Hungary around 1700, thousands of Slovaks were gradually settled in depopulated parts of the restored Kingdom of Hungary (present-day Hungary, Romania, Serbia, and Croatia) under Maria Theresia, and that is how present-day Slovak enclaves (like Slovaks in Vojvodina, Slovaks in Hungary) in these countries arose.

After Transylvania, Upper Hungary (present-day Slovakia) was the most advanced part of the Kingdom of Hungary for centuries, but in the 19th century, when Buda/Pest became the new capital of the kingdom, the importance of the territory, as well as other parts within the Kingdom fell, and many Slovaks were impoverished. As a result, hundreds of thousands of Slovaks emigrated to North America, especially in the late 19th and early 20th century (between cca. 1880–1910), a total of at least 1.5 million emigrants.

Slovakia exhibits a very rich folk culture. A part of Slovak customs and social convention are common with those of other nations of the former Habsburg monarchy (the Kingdom of Hungary was in personal union with the Habsburg monarchy from 1867 to 1918).

=== Czechoslovakia ===
People of Slovakia spent most part of the 20th century within the framework of Czechoslovakia, a new state formed after World War I. Significant reforms and post-World War II industrialization took place during this time. Slovak was strongly influenced by Czech during this period.

== Culture ==
The art of Slovakia can be traced back to the Middle Ages, when some of the greatest masterpieces of the country's history were created. Significant figures from this period included the many Old Masters, among them the Master Paul of Levoča and Master MS. More contemporary art can be seen in the shadows of Koloman Sokol, Albín Brunovský, Martin Benka, Mikuláš Galanda, Ľudovít Fulla. Julius Koller and Stanislav Filko, in the 21st century Roman Ondak, Blažej Baláž. The most important Slovak composers have been Eugen Suchoň, Ján Cikker, Mikuláš Moyzes and Alexander Moyzes, in the 21st century Vladimir Godar and Peter Machajdík.

The most famous Slovak names can indubitably be attributed to invention and technology. Such people include Jozef Murgaš, the inventor of wireless telegraphy; Ján Bahýľ, Štefan Banič, inventor of the modern parachute; Aurel Stodola, inventor of the bionic arm and pioneer in thermodynamics; and, more recently, John Dopyera, father of modern acoustic string instruments. Hungarian inventors Joseph Petzval and Ányos Jedlik were born of Slovak fathers.

Slovakia is also known for its polyhistors, of whom include Pavol Jozef Šafárik, Matej Bel, Ján Kollár, and its political revolutionaries, such Milan Rastislav Štefánik and Alexander Dubček.

There were two leading persons who codified Slovak. The first one was Anton Bernolák whose concept was based on the dialect of western Slovakia (1787). It was the enactment of the first national standard language for the Slovaks. The second notable man was Ľudovít Štúr. His formation of Slovak had principles in the dialect of central Slovakia (1843).

The best known Slovak hero was Juraj Jánošík (the Slovak equivalent of Robin Hood). The prominent explorer and diplomat Móric Beňovský, Hungarian transcript Benyovszky was Slovak as well (he comes from Vrbové in present-day Slovakia and is e.g. listed as "nobilis Slavicus – Slovak nobleman" in his secondary school registration).

In terms of sports, the Slovaks are probably best known (in North America) for their ice hockey personalities, especially Stan Mikita, Peter Šťastný, Peter Bondra, Žigmund Pálffy, Marián Hossa and Zdeno Chára. For a list see List of Slovaks. Zdeno Chára is only the second European captain in history of the NHL that led his team to win the Stanley Cup, winning it with the Boston Bruins in the season 2010–11.

For a list of the most notable Slovak writers and poets, see List of Slovak authors.

== Statistics ==
There are approximately 5.4 million autochthonous Slovaks in Slovakia. Further Slovaks live in the following countries (the list shows estimates of embassies etc. and of associations of Slovaks abroad in the first place, and official data of the countries as of 2000/2001 in the second place).

The list stems from Claude Baláž, a Canadian Slovak, the current plenipotentiary of the Government of the Slovak Republic for Slovaks abroad:

The language spread of Slovak in the United States according to 2000 Census, percentage of home speakers

- United States (1,200,000 / 821,325*) [*(1) there were, however, 1,882,915 Slovaks in the US according to the 1990 census, (2) there are some 400,000 "Czechoslovaks" in the US, a large part of which are Slovaks] – 19th – 21st century emigrants; see also United States Census
- Czech Republic (350,000 / 183,749*) [*there were, however, 314 877 Slovaks in the Czech Republic according to the 1991 census] – due to the existence of former Czechoslovakia
- Canada (100,000 / 50,860) – 19th – 21st century migrants
- Serbia (60,000 / 59,021) – 18th & 19th century settlers
- Poland (47,000 / 2,000*) [* The Central Census Commission has accepted the objection of the Association of Slovaks in Poland with respect to this number] – ancient minority and due to border shifts during the 20th century
- Hungary (39,266 / 17,693)
- Romania (18,000 / 17,199) – ancient minority
- Ukraine (17,000 / 6,397) [especially in Carpathian Ruthenia] – ancient minority and due to the existence of former Czechoslovakia
- France (13,000 / n.a.)
- Australia (12,000 / n.a.) – 20th – 21st century migrants
- Austria (10,234 / 10,234) – 20th – 21st century migrants
- United Kingdom (10,000 / n.a.)
- Croatia (5,000 / 4,712) – 18th & 19th century settlers
- other countries

The number of Slovaks living outside Slovakia in line with the above data was estimated at max. 2,016,000 in 2001 (2,660,000 in 1991), implying that, in sum, there were max. some 6,630,854 Slovaks in 2001 (7,180,000 in 1991) in the world. The estimate according to the right-hand site chart yields an approximate population of Slovaks living outside Slovakia of 1.5 million.

Other (much higher) estimates stemming from the Dom zahraničných Slovákov (House of Foreign Slovaks) can be found on SME.

== See also ==
- History of the Slovak language
- Slovaks in Austria
- Slovak Americans
- Slovaks in Bulgaria
- Slovak Australians
- Slovak Canadians
- Slovaks of Croatia
- Slovaks in the Czech Republic
- Slovaks in Hungary
- Slovaks in Montenegro
- Slovaks of Poland
- Slovaks of Romania
- Slovaks in Serbia
- Slovaks in Switzerland
- Slovaks in Ukraine
- Slovaks in Vojvodina
- Slovenes
- List of Slovak Americans
- List of Slovaks

== Sources ==
- Slovaks in Czech Republic
- Slovaks in Hungary
- Baláž, Claude: Slovenská republika a zahraniční Slováci. 2004, Martin
- Baláž, Claude: (a series of articles in:) Dilemma. 01/1999 – 05/2003
