= Vzkriesenie =

Vzkriesenie (1960) is an opera by Ján Cikker. It is based on Leo Tolstoy's last novel, Resurrection (1899).
