= Ivan Stodola =

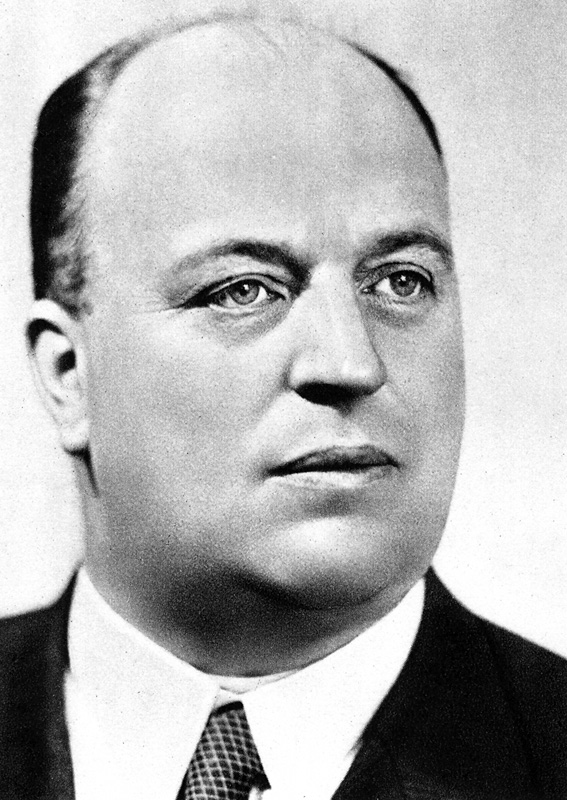
Ivan Stodola in 1937

Ivan Stodola (10 March 1888 in Liptószentmiklós – 26 March 1977 in Piešťany) was Slovak dramatist and writer.

== Biography ==
He was born in Liptószentmiklós, Hungary, Austria-Hungary (now Liptovský Mikuláš, Slovakia) into a family of professional tanners and teachers. He was educated in his hometown, Eperjes and Késmárk, and later, he studied medicine at college in Budapest and Berlin, earning a degree in 1912. He started as a doctor in his hometown, and during World War I he also worked as a wartime doctor. After the war, he returned to his hometown (by then part of Czechoslovakia), and became an editor of magazine Boj o zdravie (Struggle for Health). In 1933, he became a regional health inspector and in 1938 - 1939 worked at the Ministry of Health in Prague. In 1946 he earned a degree of lecturer of social pathology. In 1951 while he was working in Bratislava, he was illegitimately sentenced and incarcerated for eight years, but he was freed on amnesty two years later. Since 1954, he lived in Piešťany as a pensioner. In 1967, he earned a title of national artist. He died at the age of 89 on 26 March 1977 in Piešťany, Czechoslovakia (now Slovakia). He is now interred in the National Cemetery in Martin.

== Works ==
=== Comedies ===
- 1925 - Žarty (book form published in 1926)
- 1925 - Daňové pokonávanie (book form published in 1926)
- 1926 - Náš pán minister
- 1929 - Čaj u pána senátora
- 1931 - Jožko Púčik a jeho kariéra
- 1933 - Cigánča
- 1941 - Keď jubilant plače
- 1943 - Mravci a svrčkovia
- 1944 - Komédia

=== Tragedies ===
- 1928 - Bačova žena

=== Historical and romantic plays ===
- 1931 - Kráľ Svätopluk
- 1938 - Veľkomožní páni
- 1941 - Marína Havranová (book form published in 1942)
- 1946 - Básnik a smrť (it was later reworked and published in 1974 under name Zahučali hory)
- 1948 - Ján Pankrác
- 1958 - Pre sto toliarov

=== Other dramatical works ===
- 1928 - Belasý encián (book form published in 1931)
- 1930 - Posledná symfónia
- 1935 - Bankinghouse Khuvich and Comp.

=== Memoir and autobiographical works ===
- 1947 - Bolo, ako bolo
- 1968 - Náš strýko Aurel
- 1969 - Smutné časy, smutný dom
- 1972 - Z každého rožka troška
- 1977 - V šľapajach Hippokrata

=== Minor book publications ===
- 1933 - Z našej minulosti
- 1947 - Štvrťstoročné Železnô
- 1965 - Bolo ako bolo

=== Filmed works ===
- 1947 - Bačova žena (under name Varuj)
- 1958 - Jožko Púčik a jeho kariéra (under name Statočný zlodej)
