= Eugen Suchoň =

Slovak composer (1908–1993)

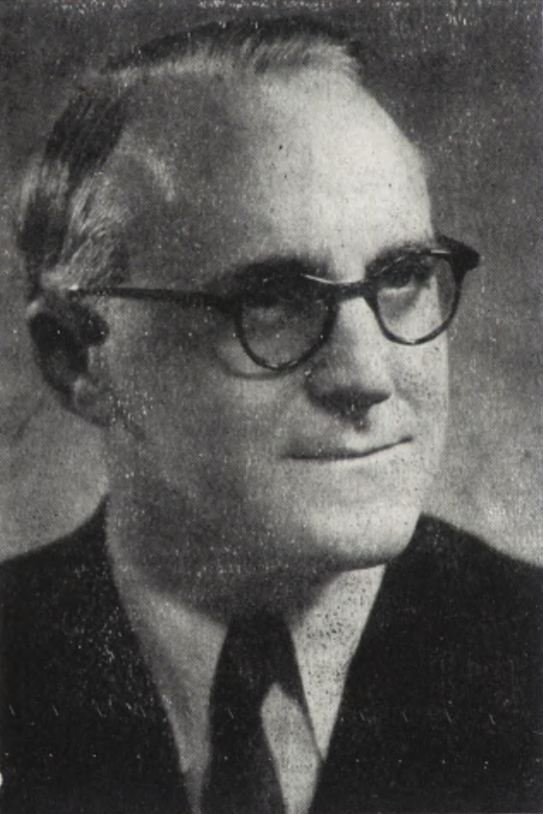
Eugen Suchoň (c. 1968)

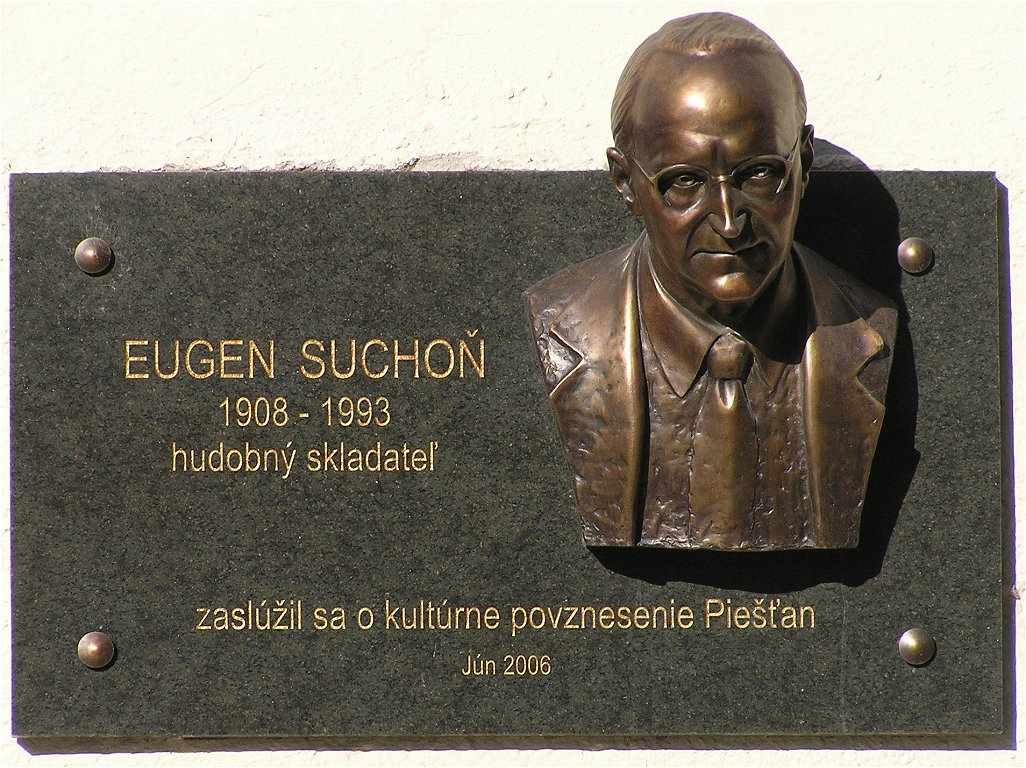
Eugen Suchoň memorial in Piešťany

Eugen Suchoň (September 25, 1908 – August 5, 1993) was one of the most important Slovak composers of the 20th century.

== Early life ==
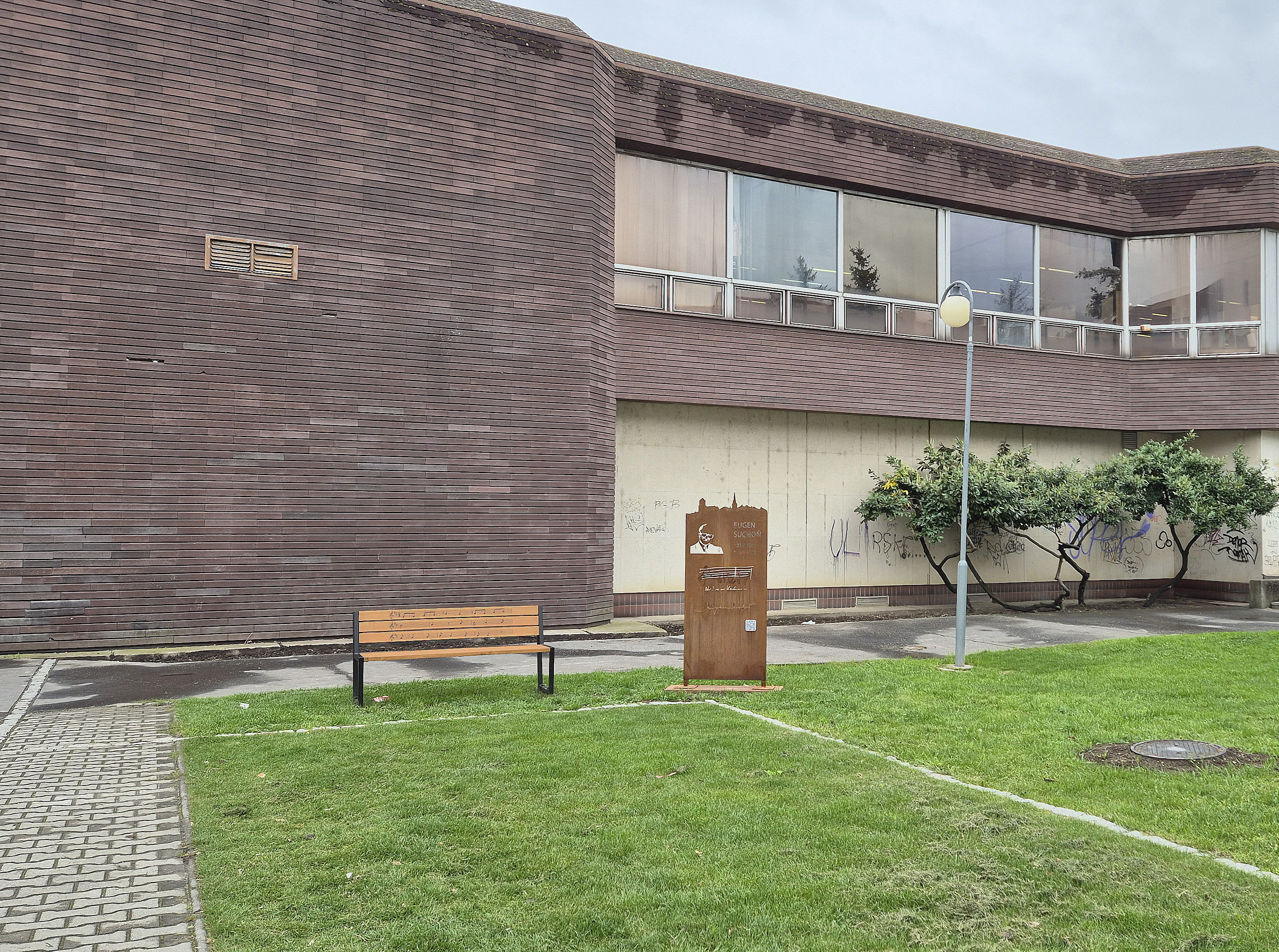
The memorial and the bench at the place where Eugen Suchoň's birth house was located (2025)

Eugen Suchoň was born on September 25, 1908, in the house opposite the Roman Catholic parish office on Farská Street (today's space near the old Pezinok Cultural Center air conditioning) in Pezinok, (Slovakia). His father, Ladislav Suchoň, was an organist and teacher. His mother, Serafína Suchoňová, was a piano teacher, and it was from her that he received his first piano tuition. The house was always filled with music and, as a small child, he would listen from under the piano when his father rehearsed at home with other musicians. In 1920, at the age of twelve, he started taking piano lessons at the Bratislava School of Music with the distinguished musician Frico Kafenda. Later, from 1927 to 1931, he continued his studies with the same teacher at the newly established Academy of Music in Bratislava. His early works include several piano compositions and a choral work Veľky Pôst (The Great Fast). He graduated from his composition classes with the Sonata in A-flat for Violin and Piano and a String Quartet (op. 2, 1931, revised 1939). His two-year studies at the Prague Conservatoire under Vítězslav Novák set the seal on the thorough training he had received from Kafenda.

Compositions from this period include a Piano Quartet (1933), and the song cycle Nox et solitudo for mezzo-soprano and small orchestra or piano (1932) based on a poem by Ivan Krasko, Little Suite with Passacaglia for piano (1930, orchestrated in 1967), Serenade for Brass Quintet and the Burlesque for Violin and Orchestra. All these works show an already distinguished and mature composer. During this time Eugen Suchoň taught music theory at the Academy of Music and Drama in Bratislava (1933). His works from this period are in a late Romantic idiom with elements of folk modality combined with chromaticism. In particular the popular male choral cycle O horách ("Of mountains") was a seminal work which established a Slovak national style. This was followed by his monumental cantata, The Psalm of the Sub-Carpathian Land (1938). Many folksong arrangements date from this period, which culminated in his opera Krútňava (The Whirlpool, 1949).

== Middle years ==
The success of Krútňava established modern Slovak opera, and drew international attention. From 1948 to 1960 Suchoň was professor and head of the Department of Music Education at the Teacher Training College in Bratislava. Works from this period include the Fantasies for Violin and Orchestra, Metamorphoses for piano, and the Symphonic Suite for grand orchestra. Suchoň became heavily involved in the practical and theoretical aspects of music education. Of particular significance was his second opera Kraľ Svätopluk ("King Svätopluk"), completed in 1959. This historic opera represents the monumental dramatic fresco from the period of the Great Moravian Empire. It is a large-scale work with noble aspirations, displaying Slavic motifs and culminating in the victory of good over evil. The work was premiered in Bratislava in 1960, and performed the same year in Prague and Košice.

== Later years ==
From 1959 to 1974 he was professor of music theory at Bratislava University. His style changed as he incorporated serialism into his compositions. Harmonies emphasizing 2nds, 4ths and 7ths led to polymodality. His later output consists predominantly of chamber and orchestral works, e. g., the song cycle Ad astra (1961), based on poems by Štefan Žáry, the mixed choir cycle O človeku ("about a human"), the Poème macabre for violin and piano, Contemplations for narrator and piano, Six Compositions for Strings, the Rhapsodic Suite for piano and orchestra and the Symfonická fantasia na BACH (1971). His piano cycle Kaleidoscope also exists in a version for piano, string orchestra and percussion. His last works include a Concertino for Clarinet and Orchestra, Elegy, Toccata, and the song cycles Glimpse into the Unknown and Three Songs for Bass.

Suchoň died in Bratislava in 1993.

== Works ==
=== Dramatic works ===
- Angelika, ballet-pantomime (1926)
- Music to Stodola's drama King Svätopluk (1935–36)
- Music to Gerzo's play Barbara of Celje (1937)

=== Operas ===
- Krútňava (The Whirlpool; 1941–49), libretto by Suchoň and Štefan Hoza
- Svätopluk (1952–59), libretto by Suchoň, Jela Krčméry-Vrteľová and Ivan Stodola

=== Symphonic works ===
- The little Suite with Passacaglia (1967)
- Overture to Stodola's drama King Svatopluk (1934)
- Balladic Suite, op. 9 (1934–36, published 1940)
- Psalm of the Carpathian land (1937–38)
- The fight will be finished tomorrow (1950)
- Metamorphoses (1951–53)
- Symfonietta Rustica (1954–55)
- The Breakthrough (1977)
- Three Songs for Bass (1984–85)
- The Night of the Witches (1927)

=== Orchestral works with soloist ===
- Burlesque (1933)
- Fantasia (1948)
- Rhapsodic Suite (1964)
- Symphonic Fantasia on B-A-C-H (1971)
- Concertino (1977)

=== Chamber works ===
- Sonata in A♭ Major (1929–30)
- String Quartet (1930–31, reworked 1939)
- Little Suite with Passacaglia (1931–32)
- Serenade (1932–33)
- Piano Quartet (1932–33)
- Balladic Suite (1935)
- Academic Fanfare of Comenius University (1937)
- Sonatina (1937)
- Wedding Dance from opera The Whirlpool (1971)
- Metamorphoses (1951–53)
- Poeme Macabre (1963)
- Six Pieces for Strings (1955–64)
- Kaleidoscope (1967)
- Toccata (1973)

=== Vocal works ===
- Nox et Solitudo (1932)
- Ad astra (1961)
- Contemplations (1964)
- Glimpse into the unknown (1977)

=== Choral works ===
- How Beautiful You Are (1932–33)
- Psalm of the Carpathian Lands, op. 12 (published in 1940)
- From the Mountain (1934–42)

=== Works for children ===
- Pictures from Slovakia (1954–55)

== Sources ==
- Suchon compositions
- The New Grove Dictionary of Music and Musicians. Ed. Stanley Sadie (1980), vol 18.
- "New Perspectives on Eugen Suchoň" by Petra Prievoznikovà in Two Countries: One Heart Bedford High School 2005
