= Ján Cikker =

Slovak composer (1911–1989)

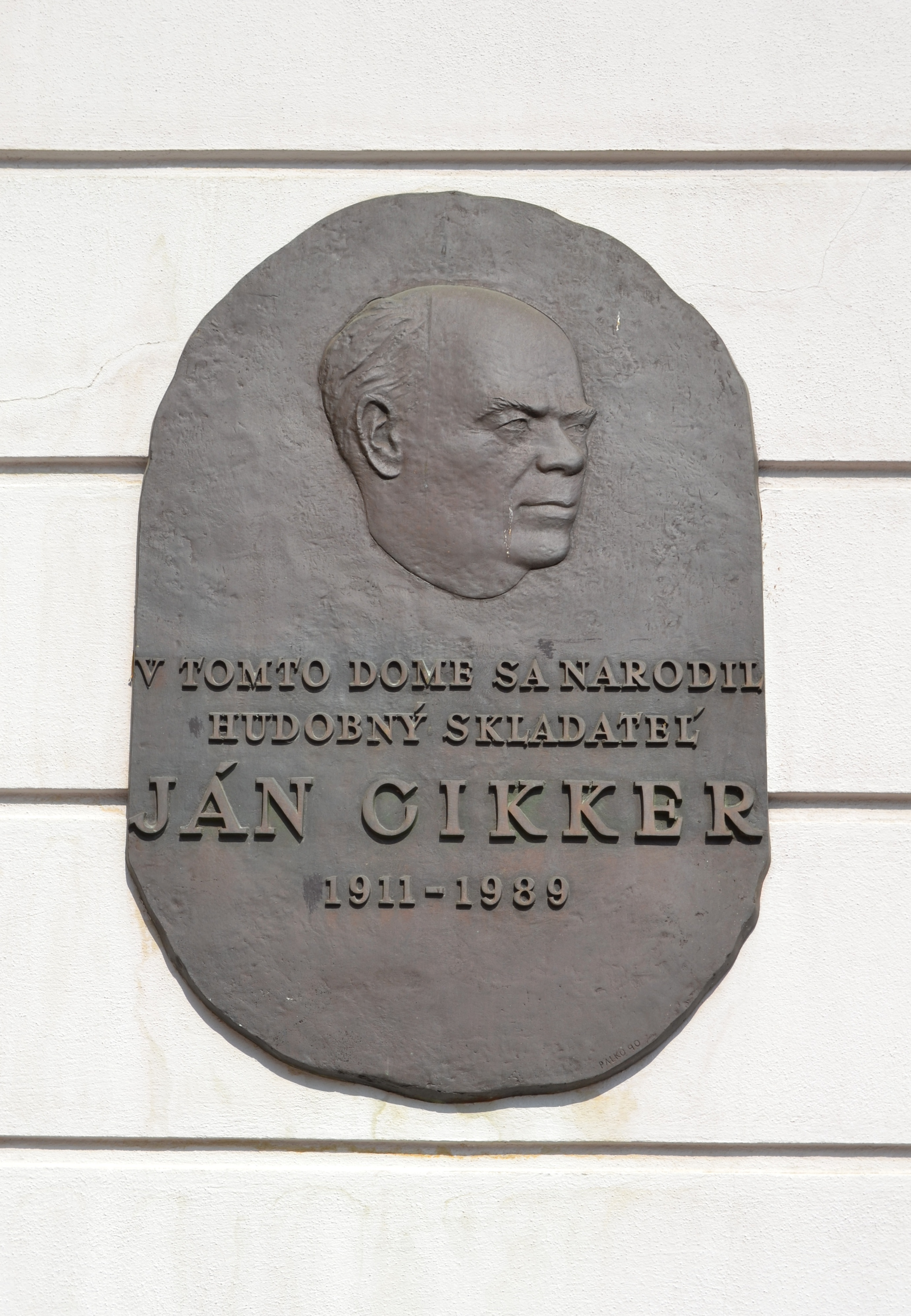
Banská Bystrica, memorial table at the native house of Jan Cikker

Ján Cikker (29 July 1911 – 21 December 1989) was a Slovak composer, a leading exponent of modern Slovak classical music. He was awarded the title National Artist in Slovakia, the Herder Prize (1966) and the IMC-UNESCO International Music Prize (1979).

== Life ==
Cikker was born in former Austria-Hungary, today Slovakia, in Banská Bystrica. His first music teachers were his mother, Mária Psotková, and Viliam Figuš-Bystrý. After he graduated from high school, he studied at the Prague Conservatory from 1930 to 1935, where he attended courses of composition of Jaroslav Křička, of conducting and organ. He then studied at the Master's School of the Prague Conservatory from 1935 to 1936, where he was a student of Vítězslav Novák. Later on, he moved to Vienna, where he studied with Felix Weingartner from 1936-1937.

From 1939 to 1949, he taught at the Bratislava Conservatory. At the same time he was a repertory advisor of the opera of the Slovak National Theatre from 1945 to 1948. He was forced to leave this post after the communist takeover of Czechoslovakia in 1948. Finally, he worked as professor for composition at the Bratislava Academy of Music and Dramatic Arts (VŠMÚ), where he was the teacher of many Slovak composers. He died in Bratislava, where a museum in his name has opened.

== Characteristics ==
His pronounced style is characterized by a typical richness of contrasting moods and characters (dance, expressive, lyrical pronunciation), and by the emphasis on humane and ethical conduct. His first creative works were nearly always instrumental, but from the 1950s onward he increasingly devoted himself to composing operas.

== Major works ==
- cycle of symphonic poems O živote – Leto, Vojak a matka, Ráno (About life – Summer, Soldier and Mother, Morning; 1941-1946)
- operas:
  - Juro Jánošík (1950-1953, libretto by Štefan Hoza),
  - Beg Bajazid (1955-1956, libretto by Štefan Hoza),
  - Mister Scrooge (1958-1959, alternative name Tiene /Shadows/, after Charles Dickens' A Christmas Carol),
  - Vzkriesenie (1960; Resurrection, after Tolstoy's novel),
  - Hra o láske a smrti (Play of Love and Death, after Romain Rolland),
  - Coriolanus (1970–72; after Shakespeare's play),
  - Obliehanie Bystrice (1969-1971; The Siege of Bystrica after Kálmán Mikszáth),
  - Zo života hmyzu (1983–86; after Karel Čapek's and Josef Čapek's play Pictures from the Insects' Life),
  - Antigona (1987–89, unfinished; after Sophocles' play)
- chamber and orchestral pieces:
  - String quartet no. 1 op. 13 (1935)
  - String quartet no. 2 op. 14 (1936)
  - Spring Symphony (1937)
  - Symfonietta Op.16 (1937, dedicated to his teacher Jaroslav Křička)
  - Concertino for piano and orchestra Op.20 (1942)
  - Slovenská suita (1943; Slovak suite)
  - Spomienky (1947; Memories)
  - Meditácie na Schützovu tému (1964; Meditations on a theme by Schütz)
  - Štúdie k činohre (1944; Studies for a theatre play, referred sometimes as “Fyzici”)
- choral works

Óda na radosť (1982, Ode to Joy; oratorio for speaker, soloists, choir and orchestra on words by Milan Rúfus. Written for the bicentennial of the Gewandhausorchester Leipzig).

- piano music: Sonatina op. 12, no. 1 (1933), Tatra brooks (1954), Piano Variations on a Slovak Folksong (1973)
- song cycle: O mamičke (1940; About Dear Mum)
- adaptations of folk songs
- theatre and film music (Varúj!)
- music for folk dance groups, e.g. for SĽUK (Slovak Folk Art Collective), Lúčnica and VÚS.

== Sources ==
Oxford Music Online, Cikker, Ján
