= Handel's Last Chance =

- Created by: David Devine; Richard Mozer
- Screenplay by: Marlene Matthews
- Story by: David Devine; Richard Mozer
- Directed by: Milan Cheylov
- Starring: Leon Pownall; Tod Fennell; Gerard Parkes; Seana McKenna
- Countries of origin: Canada; Slovakia
- Original language: English

Production
- Cinematography: David Perrault
- Editor: Michael Pacek
- Running time: 51 minutes
- Production company: Devine Entertainment

Original release
- Network: HBO
- Release: 9 December 1996

Handel's Last Chance is a 1996 television film created by David Devine and Richard Mozer for HBO Original Films of New York and directed by Milan Cheylov. A Canadian-Slovak co-production, it stars Leon Pownall, Tod Fennell, Gerard Parkes, and Seana McKenna. It follows the fictional background of the premiere performance of George Frideric Handel's Messiah in 1742, where a Dublin street boy aids the composer with his singing talent, and the composer in turn changes the boy's life by bringing out his conscience and self-confidence.

The film is the last instalment in Devine Entertainment's six-film series The Composers' Specials, after Bizet's Dream, Bach's Fight for Freedom, Strauss: The King of 3/4 Time, Liszt's Rhapsody, and Rossini's Ghost.

== Plot ==
In 1742, Handel is heading to Dublin for the premiere of his new oratorio Messiah. Meanwhile, 10-year-old Jamie O'Flaherty is singing for money on the street. Also, Hugh was playing the Flute/Recorder and then stole gold coins from a Man's pocket. However, he then follows his homeless friend Hugh and steals a chicken with him. Impeded by Handel's carriage, he tries in vain to escape and gets arrested. While Jamie is being led to the dungeon it is revealed, through the verbal exchange with his mother Mary O'Flaherty, that his father died in hunger but had, as what she calls, an honest living, but Jamie disagrees.

At St Patrick's Cathedral, Handel is disappointed at the amateur cathedral choir, much to Dean Jonathan Swift's surprise. He becomes even more frustrated after learning that no more singers are available. At the same time, Mrs O'Flaherty keeps asking for Dean Swift's help for Jamie, but he is too busy to listen. The Dean promises Handel to lend singers from Christ Church despite his abnormal thinking pattern which leads to Handel's confusion and difficulty with further conversation.

Mrs O'Flaherty, sobbing, approaches Handel when he is preparing his work on an off-key harpsichord and grumbling about his circumstances. She asks for his assistance to ensure the Dean's help, and in return promises him free laundry. Handel eventually agrees despite initial refusal. Mrs O'Flaherty was pleased, thanked him and expressed her faith in his talent before leaving.

Jamie attends the Dean's school with reluctance. He performs poorly for lacking basic knowledge, and gets picked on by Toby Binton, his mean and arrogant prefect. Meanwhile, Handel has to endure the choir, and fires Toby after exposing his lie that he sight-reads. He also finds out that Miss Abbot, the "unparalleled" soprano from Christ Church, is still a disappointment. After Jamie fights back in vain, Toby takes him forward to Dean Swift and Handel to get him into trouble. Handel, however, recognises Jamie and his singing during work. He appoints him as the lead of alto after confirming his talent.

Toby and his gang approach and attack Jamie at night. Handel intervenes and takes Jamie to his room. Jamie tells him his story, his frustration with life, and his intention to quit. In response Handel tells Jamie that he must listen to his other voice, which tells right and wrong apart. He also reveals to Jamie, that his career failure stems from that he ignored the music from his heart and composed only to please the audience, and his new work Messiah is perhaps his last chance; he too has to listen to his inner voice and believe in himself. Jamie eventually changes his mind, and makes a deal with Handel that he will stay only for he teach him to read music.

Their collaboration goes on successfully. Nevertheless, Mrs O'Flaherty loses her residence and gets imprisoned, after being robbed and therefore unable to pay rent on time. Jamie then assumes her laundry work at night with Hugh despite being inadequate, unbeknownst to Handel nor Dean Swift. As Miss Abbot and the choir is making progress, Handel only finds Jamie constantly exhausted. During work, Hugh finds Handel's gold watch and intends to keep it, but Jamie insists that it must be returned. The scene is witnessed by Toby, who then steals the watch from Jamie and accuses him of theft, leading to his arrest. In disbelief and reaching Mrs O'Flaherty in vain, Handel meets Hugh, and from whom he learns about Jamie's circumstances and that he has been working to bail out his mother. He then rushes back to confront Toby, retrieving his watch, therefore vindicates Jamie.

Jamie delivered a strong performance at the sold-out premiere. Among the audience members were Dean Swift, Hugh, and Mrs. O'Flaherty. After the Hallelujah Chorus, Handel and Jamie receive a standing ovation.

== Main cast ==
- Leon Pownall as George Frideric Handel
- Tod Fennell as Jamie O'Flaherty
  - Christopher Bell as Jamie's singing voice
- Gerard Parkes as Jonathan Swift
- Seana McKenna as Mary Margret O'Flaherty
- Cody Jones as Wee Hugh Brannigan
- Steven Miller as Toby Binton
- Jennifer Rockett as Miss Abbot

== Production ==
The film was shot on location in Bratislava and Častá, Slovakia.

The film soundtrack, entitled Music from the Film Handel's Last Chance, was released in 1996 by Sony Music. It consists of music composed by George Frideric Handel, played by Slovak Philharmonic, conducted by Ondrej Lenárd.

== Accolades ==
Year	Award	Category	Recipient(s) and nominee(s)	Result	Ref.
1997	Gemini Awards	Best Youth Program or Series	The Composers' Specials: Handel's Last Chance	Won	
1997	Gemini Awards	Best Writing in a Children's or Youth's Program or Series	Marlene Matthews	Won	
