= List of international presidential trips made by Zuzana Čaputová =

Map of visited countries.

This is a list of international presidential trips made by Zuzana Čaputová, the fifth president of the Slovak republic, from her inauguration on 15 June 2019 until she left office on June 15 2024.

== Countries ==
Since June 2019, she has visited these countries:

- 1 visit: Denmark, Iceland, Israel, Japan, Vatican City, Slovenia, Latvia, Lithuania, United Arab Emirates, Moldova, Italy, Spain, Greece, North Macedonia, Malta, Egypt
- 2 visits: Hungary, Ukraine, Switzerland, United States, France
- 3 visits: Austria, Belgium, United Kingdom
- 5 visits: Germany, Poland
- 8 visits: Czech Republic

== List ==
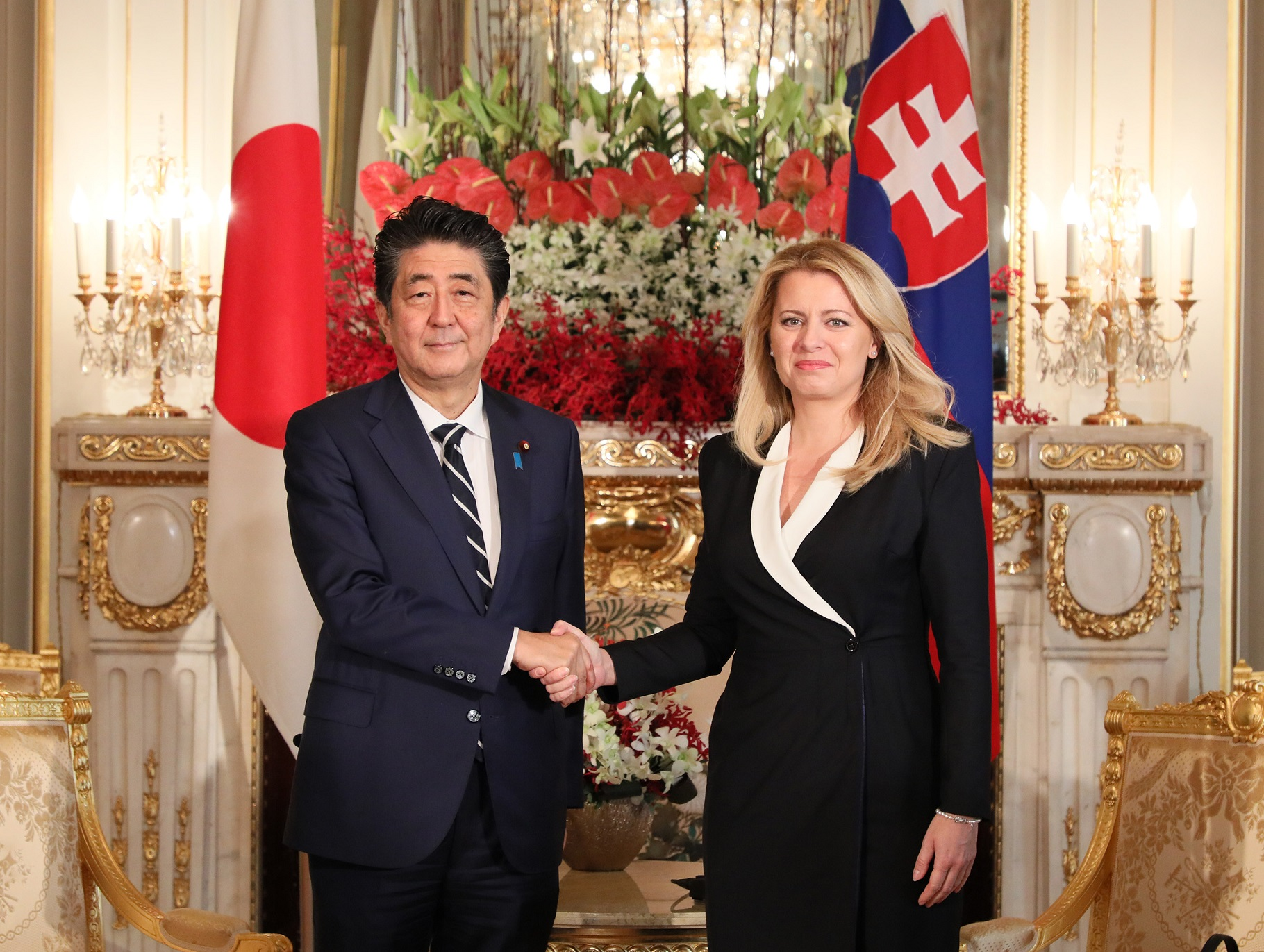
Čaputová meets with the Prime Minister of Japan, Shinzo Abe.

=== 2019 ===
No.	Date	Country	Venue	Details
1	20 June 2019	Czech Republic	Prague	Meeting with president Zeman, speakers of both houses of the Czech parliament. Laying wreaths to the Milan Rastislav Štefánik memorial and on the grave of Václav Havel. End of official programme was a concert with name: Zuznana is not alone at home, which was organized by Slovaks living in the Czech Republic.
2	25 June 2019	Belgium	Brussels	Meeting with president of European commission Jean-Claude Juncker, Jens Stoltenberg from NATO, King Philipp and Slovak diplomats in EU and NATO. Meeting with Slovak citizens living in Belgium.
3	11 July 2019	Hungary	Budapest	Meeting with president Áder and prime minister Orbán, leaning wreath to the president Árpád Göncz memorial and meeting with Slovaks living in Hungary.
4	15 July 2019	Poland	Warsaw	Meeting with president Andrzej Duda, speakers of the both houses of parliament, Marek Kuchciński and Stanisław Karczewski, and with prime minister Mateusz Morawiecki.
5	24 July 2019	France	Paris	Meeting with president Emmanuel Macron and leaning bouquet in front of the Bataclan club, which was attacked by terrorists in 2015.
5	25 July 2019	France	Meudon	Laying wreaths to the Milan Rastislav Štefánik memorial.
6	10 August 2019	Switzerland	Ascona	Takeover of the European prize for political culture and attending a discussion about actual development in the Europe.
7	21 August 2019	Germany	Berlin	Meeting with president Frank-Walter Steinmeier, chancellor Angela Merkel and laying wreaths to the White crosses memorial, which commemorates people who died while trying to escape through the Berlin wall.
7	22 August 2019	Germany	Berlin	Meeting with president Frank-Walter Steinmeier, chancellor Angela Merkel and laying wreaths to the White crosses memorial, which commemorates people who died while trying to escape through the Berlin wall.
8	30 August 2019	Austria	Vienna	Meeting with president Alexander Van der Bellen, chancellor Brigitte Bierlein, employees of the Slovak embassy and permanent missions of Slovakia in OBSE and OSN in Vienna. Visiting Albertina museum.
9	1 September 2019	Poland	Warsaw	Commemorating the beginning of the World War II.
10	16 September 2019	Ukraine	Kyiv	Meeting with president Volodymyr Zelenskyy and prime minister Oleksiy Honcharuk. Laying wreaths to the Memorial of the unknown soldier and commemorating the victims of the Famine in Ukraine.
11	20–27 September 2019	United States	New York City; East Brunswick, NJ	Visit of the Czech national house in New York and taking part in conference organisated by Globsec on the occasion of the 30th anniversary of end of totality in the middle Europe. Attendance in the General Assembly of the United Nations and climate summit. Meeting with Slovaks in America at 42nd Slovak Heritage Festival, meeting with Secretary-General of the United Nations António Guterres.
12	2–3 October 2019	Czech Republic	Lány	Attendance at meeting of presidents of member countries of the Visegrád Group with presidents of Slovenia and Serbia, Borut Pahor and Aleksandar Vučić.
13	20–23 October 2019	Japan	Tokyo	Attendance at enthronement of emperor Naruhito, meeting with prime minister Shinzō Abe and getting to know new innovations in the field of environment.
14	9 November 2019	Germany	Berlin	Celebrating the 30th anniversary of the fall of the Berlin Wall and the end of communist totalitarianism in the GDR.
15	12 November 2019	Czech Republic	Prague	Commemorating the 30th anniversary of the start of the Velvet revolution by laying wreaths to the memorial of the 17 November 1989 in Národní, Prague. Taking part in a discussion TV programme at ČT24 called Fokus Václava Moravce.
16	3–4 December 2019	(United Kingdom) UK	London; Watford	Attendance at the solemn reception hosted by Queen Elizabeth II in Buckingham Palace followed by the reception hosted by prime minister Boris Johnson, both to celebrate the 70th anniversary of establishment of NATO. Attendance at the summit of the North Atlantic Council and giving a speech there. At the Brookwood Cemetery, commemorating general Ivan Otto Schwarz and Czechoslovak soldiers who died during the WWII.

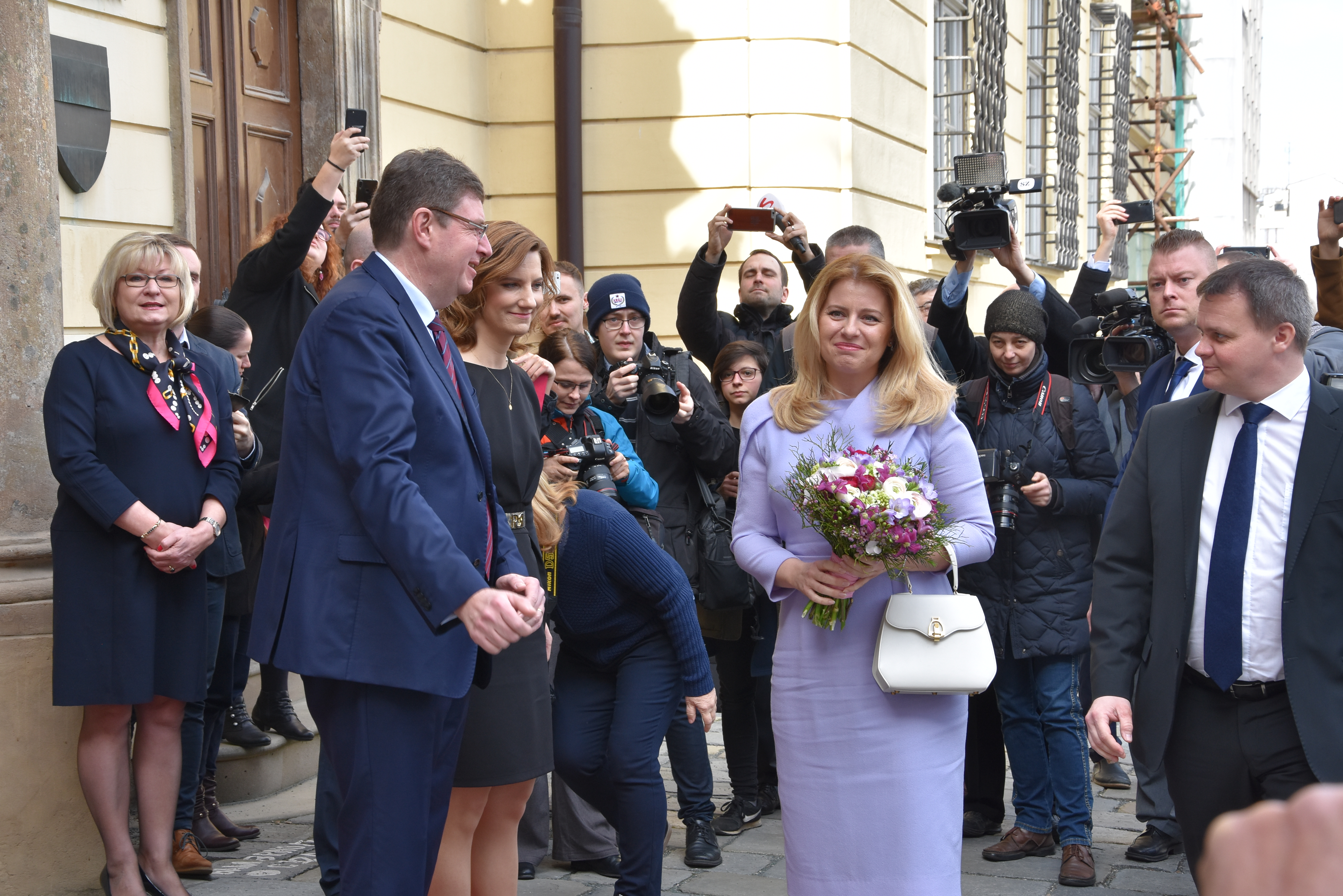
Čaputová meets with Mayor of Brno, Markéta Vaňková, during her March 2020 trip in Czech Republic.

=== 2020 ===
No.	Date	Country	Venue	Details
17	23 January 2020	Israel	Jerusalem	Commemorating Holocaust by attendance at the World Holocaust Forum organized to mark the 75th anniversary of liberation of the Auschwitz-Birkenau concentration camp. Meeting with president Reuven Rivlin and visiting the sacred places of Israel.
18	27 January 2020	Poland	Oświęcim	Attendance at a ceremonial to mark the 75th anniversary of liberation of the Auschwitz-Birkenau concentration camp.
19	16 February 2020	Germany	Munich	Attendance at the Munich Security Conference. It was the first attendance of the Slovak head of state at this conference.
20	10 March 2020	Czech Republic	Hodonín; Brno	Commemorating president Tomáš Garrigue Masaryk in his hometown Hodonín and meeting with mayor of Hodonín Libor Střecha. Meeting with Markéta Vaňková, mayor of Brno, and commemorating the 100th anniversary of adopting of the Czechoslovak Constitution of 1920 on event in the Constitutional Court of the Czech Republic with presidents of Slovak and Czech constitutional courts, Ivan Fiačan and Pavel Rychetský, president of the Senate Miloš Vystrčil, constitutional judges and other guests. President Miloš Zeman apologized for his absence.
21	8 September 2020	Czech Republic	Kroměříž	Addressing conference Ethics in Law, at Judicial Academy of Kroměříž.
22	17 September 2020	Austria	Vienna	Took part in Austrian World Summit.
23	14 December 2020	Vatican City	Vatican City	Visit included a private audience with Pope Francis, meeting with Secretary for Relations with States Paul Richard Gallagher and a meeting with Cardinal Jozef Tomko. The Pope and the President exchanged gifts, including some 10 000 PCR tests invented by Slovak scientists, a painting of Our Lady of Sorrows, Patroness of Slovakia and candles made by socially disadvantaged. Pope presented a bronze sculpture featuring a message of peace and two papal documents.

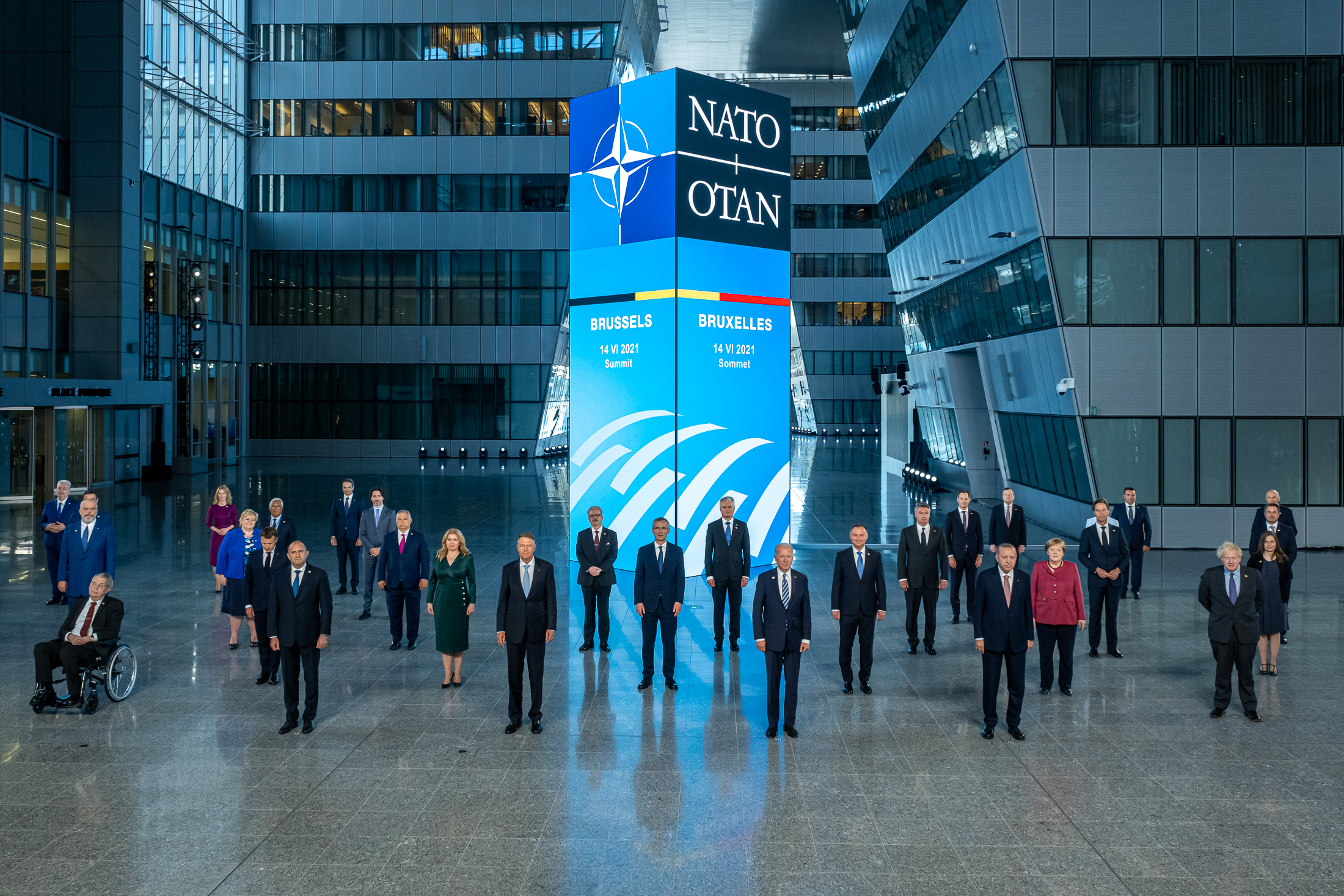
NATO leaders at June 2021 Summit in Brussels. 13th from the left- Zuzana Čaputová.

=== 2021 ===
No.	Date	Country	Venue	Details
24	9–10 February 2021	Poland	Hel	Commemorating the 30th anniversary of the establishment of the Visegrád Group. Meeting with president of Poland, president of the Czech Republic and president of Hungary
25	10-11 May 2021	Denmark	Copenhagen	Met with Frederik, Crown Prince of Denmark, Mette Frederiksen, speak at the Copenhagen Democracy Summit and also boosting Danish-Slovak ties.
26	14 June 2021	Belgium	Brussels	Attended NATO summit. Met with US president Joe Biden for the first time.
27	26 July 2021	Austria	Salzburg	After the invitation from Austria's President, Alexander van der Bellen, Čaputová attended the opening concert of Salzburger Festspiele, a classical music festival.
28	1-2 October 2021	Germany	Aachen	Attended Charlemagne Prize 2021 awarding ceremony in Aachen City Hall. Invited to address the attendees of the ceremony. Met with Slovak compatriots living in Aachen.
29	14 October 2021	Slovenia	Ljubljana Bled	Official visit to the Republic of Slovenia. Met with the president of Slovenia, Borut Pahor, in Ljubljana, taking part in protocolar commemoration at the Monument to the Victims of All Wars. Later, they visited Bled and Triglav National Park.
30	1-3 November 2021	(United Kingdom) UK	Glasgow Edinburgh	Attending the climate summit COP26. Travelled with a commercial airline. After the end of the summit, Čaputová held a conference meeting in Edinburgh, discussing with Slovak students living and studying in Scotland.
31	16 November 2021	Czech Republic	Prague	Privately met with Czech president Miloš Zeman during his hospitalisation. Received the Silver Medal of the Speaker of the Senate. Laid flowers at the Velvet Revolution memorial on Národní tř.
32	29 November 2021	Hungary	Budapest	Attended summit of V4 presidents in Budapest. Received with honours at Heroes' Square and moved to the National Museum for the summit proper. This summit was not attended by Czech president as he tested positive for Covid-19.
33	20 December 2021	Latvia	Eimuru, Ādaži Airfield	Visited Slovak soldiers at Camp Ādaži in Latvia.

=== 2022 ===
No.	Date	Country	Venue	Details
34	27-28 January 2022	(United Arab Emirates) UAE	Dubai	Opened Slovak National Day at the EXPO World Exhibition in Dubai.
35	25 February 2022	Poland	Warsaw	Represented Slovakia at the extraordinary virtual summit of NATO on Friday 25 February 2022.
36	24 March 2022	Belgium	Brussels	Attended extraordinary NATO summit, which took place exactly a month after the start of the russian invasion of Ukraine.
37	30 March 2022	Moldova	Chișinău	Visited Moldova, where she met President Maia Sandu and Prime Minister Natalia Gavrilița in Chișinău.
38	20-21 April 2022	Italy	Naples; Rome	Met with Italian president Sergio Mattarella in Rome. Participated in the ceremonial premiere of the opera Tosca at the San Carlo theater in Naples. Opened a Slovak-Italian business forum in Rome.
39	19-21 May 2022	Switzerland	Bern; Zürich; Geneva	This is the first time that a Slovak head of the state has travelled to Switzerland for a state visit. Met with Swiss president Ignazio Cassis in Bern. The President also visited the Swiss Federal Institute of Technology in Zurich, and there opened a Slovak-Swiss business forum with the Swiss president. In Geneva, she visited the CERN headquarters.
40	27 May 2022	Czech Republic	Prague	The President honored the memory of the heroes of Operation Anthropoid. Met with Czech president Miloš Zeman.
41	31 May 2022	Ukraine	Borodianka; Irpin; Kyiv	Visited the towns of Borodianka and Irpin nearby Kiev, where she "has seen with her very own eyes the traces of destruction by Russian soldiers". Later met with Ukrainian president Volodymyr Zelenskyy and delivered a speech before the deputies in the Ukrainian Parliament.
42	28-30 June 2022	Spain	Madrid	Attended NATO summit. The summit was of historical significance due to the adopted decisions, such as the agreement on the membership of Finland and Sweden in the Alliance.
43	5-6 September 2022	Greece	Athens	Met with Greek president Katerina Sakellaropoulou and the Prime Minister Kyriakos Mitsotakis. The president also conferred the state decoration, Order of the White Cross of the first class on the Greek President, with the Greek party in turn conferring the supreme state decoration of the Hellenic Republic, the Grand Cross of the Order of the Redeemer on the Slovak head of state.
44	7 September 2022	North Macedonia	Skopje	Discussed the energy crisis with President Stevo Pendarovski and Prime Minister Dimitar Kovačevski.
45	18-19 September 2022	(United Kingdom) UK	London	Attended the state funeral of Elizabeth II. Met with the new monarch Charles III.
46	20-22 September 2022	United States	New York City	Participated in the 77th UN general assembly, met with UN Secretary-General António Guterres and Executive Director of UN-Women Sima Bahous.
47	5-6 October 2022	Malta	Valletta	Meeting of the presidents of the Arraiolos Group. Honored the memory of investigative journalist Daphne Caruana Galizia.
48	19 October 2022	France	Strasbourg	Speech in the European Parliament, where she condemned the 2022 Bratislava shooting, declared an anti-LGBT hate crime and a terrorist attack.
49	5 November 2022	Germany	Frankfurt	Received the Freedom Award of the Friedrich Naumann Foundation in Frankfurt am Main.
50	7-8 November 2022	Egypt	Sharm El Sheikh	Attended the climate summit COP27. Met with Ursula von der Leyen, John Kerry and also with Kenyan president William Ruto.
51	16 November 2022	Czech Republic	Prague	Met with Czech president Miloš Zeman and commemorated the Velvet Revolution.
Last updated: 20 November 2022

=== 2023 ===
No.	Date	Country	Venue	Details
52	22 February	Poland	Warsaw	Extraordinary Summit of the Bucharest Nine due to the Ukraine conflict.
53	5–6 May	United Kingdom	London	Attendance to the Coronation of King Charles III
54	16–17 May	Iceland	Reykjavík	Čaputová attended the 4th Council of Europe summit.
55	11–12 July	Lithuania	Vilnius	Attended 2023 Vilnius NATO summit

== Multilateral meetings ==
Multilateral meetings of the following intergovernmental organizations took place during Zuzana Čaputová's presidency (2019–2024).

Group	Year					
Group	2019	2020	2021	2022	2023	2024
UNGA	23–25 September, (United States) New York City	26 September, (videoconference) (United States) New York City	20–23 September, (United States) New York City	20–26 September, (United States) New York City	19–26 September, (United States) New York City	
NATO	3–4 December, (United Kingdom) Watford	None	14 June, (Belgium) Brussels	24 March, (Belgium) Brussels	11–12 July, (Lithuania) Vilnius	
NATO	3–4 December, (United Kingdom) Watford	None	14 June, (Belgium) Brussels	June 28–30, (Spain) Madrid	11–12 July, (Lithuania) Vilnius	
Bucharest Nine		None	10 May, (Romania) Bucharest	25 February, (Poland) Warsaw	22 February, (Poland) Warsaw	11 June, (Latvia) Riga
Bucharest Nine		None	10 May, (Romania) Bucharest	10 June, (Romania) Bucharest	6 June, (Slovakia) Bratislava	11 June, (Latvia) Riga
