= Leon Pownall =

Welsh-Canadian actor and director (1943–2006)

- Born: April 26, 1943; Wrexham, Denbighshire, Wales
- Died: June 2, 2006 (aged 63); Stratford, Ontario, Canada
- Occupation: Actor

Leon Pownall (April 26, 1943 – June 2, 2006) was a Welsh-Canadian actor and director.

He was born in Wrexham, Wales and moved to Hamilton, Ontario with his family in 1957. He performed at the Stratford Festival during the 1960s and returned several times to the festival over the years to perform, the last time in 2002 as a director.

Pownall wrote and performed a one-man play, Do Not Go Gentle, about Dylan Thomas. Geraint Wyn Davies later performed this work off-Broadway in 2005 and at the Stratford Festival in 2010.

His film credits include Dead Poets Society (1989), in which he shared the screen with Robin Williams, as well as the title role in Handel's Last Chance (1996) and a supporting role in the Golden Globe-winning Dirty Pictures (2000). Pownall was nominated for a Gemini Award for the role of Dr. Ewan Cameron in the 1998 Canadian television mini-series The Sleep Room. He also appeared in television series such as The Beachcombers, Street Legal, Wiseguy, and Slings & Arrows.

Pownall died from cancer in Stratford, Ontario, on June 2, 2006, at the age of 63.

== Filmography ==
Year	Title	Role	Notes
1968	A Great Big Thing	Ray	
1970	Twelve and a Half Cents	Father	
1989	Dead Poets Society	McAllister	
1989	Termini Station	Charles Marshall	
1989	Bye Bye Blues	Bernie Blitzer	
1989	Love and Hate: The Story of Colin and JoAnn Thatcher	Gerry Gerrand	
1990	Angel Square	Blue Cheeks	
1994	How the West Was Fun	Leo McRugger	
1996	Handel's Last Chance	Georg Friedrich Handel	
1997	Dinner at Fred's	George Billings	
1998	The Sleep Room	Dr. Ewen Cameron	
1998	Sleeping Dogs Lie	Inspector Mitchell	
2005	Bailey's Billion$	Judge Cornelius Strawacher	
