= Liszt's Rhapsody =

- Directed by: Richard Mozer
- Written by: Heather Conkie
- Story by: David Devine
- Produced by: David Devine; Richard Mozer
- Starring: Geordie Johnson; Drew Jurecka; Peter Keleghan; Ida Carnevali; Fab Filippo
- Cinematography: David Perrault
- Edited by: Michael Pacek
- Production company: Devine Entertainment
- Distributed by: HBO Original Films
- Release date: 1996
- Running time: 49 minutes
- Country: Canada
- Language: English

Liszt's Rhapsody is a 1996 HBO Original Film produced and directed by Richard Mozer, with co-production by David Devine.

== Premise ==
Franz Liszt, already an acclaimed musician, meets the young Josy, who becomes his student and challenges his master's views.

== Cast ==
- Geordie Johnson as Franz Liszt
- Drew Jurecka as Josy
- Peter Keleghan as Count Teleky
- Ida Carnevali as Fanny
- Fab Filippo as Janka
- Dylan Gray as Rom

== Production ==
The film was shot in the small mountain town of Labin, in Istria, Croatia.

The film was released on DVD and has been broadcast in various countries outside the United States. The film and its corresponding Teacher's Guide has been used in elementary and middle schools by music teachers.

Liszt's Rhapsody was one of seven films made for HBO for the 7- to 14-year-old set, introducing them to classical music and composers.

=== Soundtrack ===
The CD and soundtrack, produced by Richard Mozer for Sony MUSIC of New York, was composed by Franz Liszt, and was recorded at the Slovak Philharmonic, with an 88-person symphony orchestra conducted by Ondrej Lenárd.

Tracks include:

1. Hungarian Rhapsody No. 9 ("Carnival in Pest") 12:11
2. Mephisto Waltz 11:32
3. Liebestraum (Dream of Love) 4:27
4. Orpheus, symphonic poem 10:38
5. Les préludes, symphonic poem 15:28
6. Hungarian Rhapsody No. 2 9:52

== Reception ==
Charles P. Mitchell found it was "misrepresent[ing] the man and the composer" and that Geordie Johnson could have made an acceptable portrayal if the script hadn't been so poor. However, John C . Tibbetts judged it was the best of the series and a "charming fable in multiculturalism base on a true but little-known incident in Liszt's life".
