= David Devine =

David Devine may refer to:

- David Devine (athlete) (born 1992), British Paralympic athlete
- David Devine (director) (born 1952), Canadian film director and producer
- David Devine (footballer) (born 2001), Scottish football player (Alloa Athletic)
