= Slovak Radio Symphony Orchestra =

Symphony orchestra based in Bratislava, Slovakia

- Radio orchestra
- Native name: Symfonický orchester Slovenského rozhlasu
- Former name: Czecho-Slovak Radio Symphony Orchestra; CSR Symphony Orchestra
- Founded: 1929; 96 years ago
- Location: Bratislava, Slovakia
- Principal conductor: Ondrej Lenárd

The Slovak Radio Symphony Orchestra (Slovak: Symfonický orchester Slovenského rozhlasu; SOSR), previously known as Czecho-Slovak Radio Symphony Orchestra and CSR Symphony Orchestra, is a symphony radio orchestra based in Bratislava, Slovakia.

Founded in 1929 to serve Slovak Radio, the orchestra became particularly associated with the music of Slovak composers, notably Alexander Moyzes, Eugen Suchoň and Ján Cikker.

Its first chief conductor was František Dyk, and the successive chief conductors of the orchestra have included Krešimir Baranović, Ľudovít Rajter, Ladislav Slovák, Václav Jiráček, Otakar Trhlík, Bystrík Režucha, Ondrej Lenárd (1977–90), Róbert Stankovský (1990–2001), Charles Olivieri-Munroe (2001–03), Oliver von Dohnányi (2006–07), Mario Košik. and Peter Valentovič. In 2019, Ondrej Lenárd came back as the chief conductor.

The orchestra has become well known abroad through its broadcasts and recordings, particularly for the Naxos Records label.
