= Bach's Fight for Freedom =

- Directed by: Stuart Gillard
- Written by: Story David Devine; Writer Raymond Storey
- Produced by: David Devine; Richard Mozer
- Starring: Ted Dykstra; Kyle Labine; Ian D. Clark; Rosemary Dunsmore; Kevin Jubinville; Ross Petty; Eric Peterson
- Cinematography: David Perrault
- Edited by: Michael Pacek
- Music by: Johann Sebastian Bach
- Production company: Devine Entertainment
- Release date: 1995
- Running time: 53 min.
- Countries: Canada; Czech Republic
- Language: English

Bach's Fight for Freedom is a 1995 film created by David Devine and Richard Mozer for HBO Original Films of New York and directed by Stuart Gillard.

The film was shot in Český Krumlov, Bohemia, in the southern Czech Republic. The soundtrack score features the Brandenburg Concertos, which were produced by David Devine for Sony Music of New York. The Slovak Philharmonic was commissioned to perform the soundtrack and was conducted by Ondrej Leonard.

The film has been broadcast in over 100 countries in many languages and has been shown in music classes.

== Plot ==
Ten-year-old Frederick Muller is a poor but honest and free-thinking boy who lives with his mother Gerta and father Josef in an early 18th century Prussian dukedom. Josef is valet to the aging, bad-tempered and somewhat foolishly stubborn duke, whom he will do anything to win the favor of. Josef is also estranged from Frederick, who would rather be a stonemason than a servant to the duke. On Frederick's birthday, during a party Frederick was invited to, Composer Johann Sebastian Bach storms in and argues with the Duke and his right-hand man, the Concertmaster, about his working conditions and the music that they both say should be played in the chapel. Bach wants to play new and happier music as it "lifts people up", but the duke stubbornly prefers only dirges or, as he calls them, "the old hymns". To further impress the Duke, Josef decides to make Frederick Bach's assistant. Seeing this as a way to restrain Bach's obstinate behavior and keep him under their thumb, The Concert Master, his assistant Melchior, and the Duke agree. At first, Bach is annoyed at Frederick, who is equally annoyed by the fact that he is doing this on his father's orders. But gradually, Bach comes to see the honest Frederick as a friend and they spend a lot of time together.

Feeling threatened by Bach's influence on his son, Josef starts to hate Bach, especially when Bach takes Frederick to the Red Palace, the home of the Duke's nephew, Prince August, for a concert performance. After Frederick innocently and happily tells his parents about the Red Palace, Joesf leaks the information to the Duke, who has Bach defeated for the role of the Concertmaster by Melchior, as the Concertmaster is bound to retire in a month. An enraged Bach confronts the Duke. Frederick confronts his father, who tells him that Bach's insubordinate behavior should be punished. Frederick protests, stating that Bach wants to share his musical capabilities and is frustrated with the creative constraints the Duke oppresses on him. Frederick scathingly declares that Bach is more of a man than his father is, straining their relationship further.

Frederick continues to spend time with Bach, who sympathizes with the boy's frustration. During a meal with Bach's family he is invited to, Frederick's disappointment in his own family peaks and he opens up to Bach about his disappointment in his father. Bach tells Frederick of his experience with his father and that he shouldn't be too hard on his father.

Bach announces to Frederick has been offered a musical position for Prince Leopold in Köthen and asks Frederick to assist him. Unbeknownst to either of them, a jealous Josef overhears them and reports this to the Duke. This proves to be the final straw for the Duke and the concertmaster. They angrily confront Bach. When Bach stands his ground, the duke orders his arrest. Frederick tries to help Bach escape but they are stopped by Josef. The duke's guards throw Bach in a cell, separating him from Frederick. Frederick, meanwhile, is placed on probation. Frederick worries about Bach, causing further friction between him and his father. Josef is enraged that Frederick still supports Bach. Fed up with how his family still has to continue to pander to the Duke, Frederick declares Bach is freer than Josef and anyone else in the household and that he is sick and tired of the Duke before storming off in anger. A bitter and bereaved Josef storms up to Bach's jail and rips up his music, believing it will render the composer powerless. Bach, however, is able to play without his music, saying that he learned it from memory. Humiliated, Josef begs Bach to not drive Frederick away from him, but Bach tells him that he (Josef) is the only one who can drive Frederick away. Realizing his mistake and that he should listen to his son, Josef leaves.

The next day, Prince August and his fiancé Elonora try to free Bach but the Duke dismisses it, comparing Bach to a slave, but Frederick and Josef (who both have reconciled) enter at that very moment, convincing the others to free him, saying Bach's music makes him feel free, and a man's soul cannot be held prisoner. Realizing the futility of the situation, The Duke, admits defeat and lets Bach go free. Frederick reunites with Bach as he personally sets him free. The film ends with Bach and Frederick, who has decided to play music like Bach, playing for a crowd. Josef looks on, finally proud of his son. The Duke and concertmaster, representing the Old Guard, sit dejectedly near the crowd and the Duke states that he still liked the "Old Hymns" and the concertmaster agrees.

== Cast ==
- Ted Dykstra as Johann Sebastian Bach
- Kyle Labine as Frederick Muller
- Ian D. Clark as Josef Muller
- Rosemary Dunsmore as Gerta Muller
- Kevin Jubinville as Prince August
- Ross Petty as the Concertmaster
- Eric Peterson as the Duke
- Tanya Posival as Maria Bach
- Jaroslav Kubes as Melchior
- Ann Tabler as Elonora
