= Gemini Award for Best Children's or Youth Program or Series =

Discontinued annual Canadian media award

The Gemini Awards for Best Children's or Youth Program or Series was presented by the Gemini Awards to honour English children's television programming produced in Canada.

Prior to 1998, a single award was presented for children's programming, regardless of age bracket and inclusive of both fiction and non-fiction programming. In that year, a new award was created for Best Pre-School Program or Series, separating programming for toddlers and young children from programming for older children and teenagers. In 2002, the award was split into separate awards for Best Fiction Program or Series and Best Non-Fiction Program or Series, and the single award was no longer presented.

== Winners and Nominees ==
Winners in bold.

=== Best Children's Program ===
==== 1980s ====
1986

- The Kids of Degrassi Street: "Griff Gets a Hand" (CBC)
- A Whole New Ball Game

1987

- **Down at Fraggle Rock: Behind the Scenes** (CBC)
- Stone Fox (NBC)
- The Conserving Kingdom (TVOntario)

1988

- **They Look A Lot Like Us: A China Odyssey** (CBC)

=== Best Children's Series ===
==== 1980s ====
1986

- **Fraggle Rock** (CBC)
- OWL/TV (CBC)
- Today's Special (TVOntario)
- Wonderstruck (CBC)

1987

- **Degrassi Junior High** (CBC)
- Fraggle Rock (CBC)
- Spirit Bay (CBC and TVOntario)
- What's New (CBC)

1988

- **Ramona** (CBC)
- Mr. Dressup (CBC)
- Today's Special (TVOntario)
- What's New (CBC)
- Wonderstruck (CBC)

=== Best Children's Program or Series ===
==== 1980s ====
1989

- **Mr. Dressup** (CBC)
- Bob Schneider & The Rainbow Kids in concert
- Happy Castle (Global)

==== 1990s ====
1990

- **Raffi in Concert with the Rise and Shine Band** (CBC)
- Dear Aunt Agnes (TVOntario)
- Fred Penner's Place (CBC)
- Under the Umbrella Tree (CBC)

1992

- **The Garden** (CTV)
- Join In! (TVOntario)
- Take Off (The Family Channel)

1993

- **Shining Time Station** (PBS)
- Alligator Pie (CBC)
- Curse of the Viking Grave (Disney Channel)
- OWL/TV (CBC)

1994

- **Lamb Chop's Play-Along** (YTV)
- Join In! (TVOntario)
- The Big Comfy Couch (YTV)
- Under the Umbrella Tree Special (CBC)

1995

- **The Big Comfy Couch** (YTV)
- Candles, Snow & Mistletoe (CBC)
- Fred Penner's Place (CBC)
- The Biggest Little Ticket (CTV)
- Wild Side Show (Nickelodeon)

1996

- **Are You Afraid of the Dark?** (YTV)
- Jim Henson's Dog City (Global)
- Mighty Machines (TVOntario)
- The Adventures of Dudley the Dragon (TVOntario)
- The Composer's Specials (HBO)
- Theodore Tugboat (CBC)

1997

- **The Adventures of Dudley the Dragon** (TVOntario)
- Goosebumps (YTV)
- Groundling Marsh (YTV)
- On My Mind (TVOntario)
- Shining Time Station ("Second Chances") (PBS)

=== Best Youth Program or Series ===
==== 1980s ====
1989

- **Wonderstruck** (CBC)
- Skin
- What's New (CBC)
- YTV Hits (YTV)

==== 1990s ====
1990

- **Talkin' About AIDS**
- The Party's Over
- YTV Rocks (YTV)

1992

- **Lost in the Barrens** (Disney Channel)
- Diary of a Teenage Smoker (CBC)
- The NewMusic ("Rock 'n' Roll 'n' Reading") (CityTV)
- Too Close...For Comfort

1993

- **The Jellybean Odyssey** (CBC)
- Degrassi Talks (CBC)
- Road Movies (CBC)
- Wonderstruck (CBC)

1994

- **Street Cents** (CBC)
- Are You Afraid of the Dark? (YTV)
- Minoru: Memory of Exile
- Spirit Rider (CBC)
- The Odyssey (CBC)

1995

- **Street Cents** (CBC)
- AIDScare/AIDsCare (CBC)
- Brainstorm (TVOntario)
- For Angela
- Ready or Not (Global)

1996

- **Ready or Not** (Global)
- Girl Talk
- Madison (Global)
- What: Body Part Art (TVOntario)
- YTV News (YTV)

1997

- **The Composer's Specials** ("Handel's Last Chance") (HBO)
- Are You Afraid of the Dark? (YTV)
- Heck's Way Home (CTV)
- Inquiring Minds (TVOntario)
- Madison (Global)

=== Best Children's or Youth Program or Series ===
==== 1990s ====
1998 - A

- **Street Cents** (CBC)
- Goosebumps (YTV)
- Ready or Not (Global)
- ReBoot (YTV)
- The Adventures of Shirley Holmes (YTV)

1998 - B

- **Ready or Not** (Global)
- Incredible Story Studio (YTV)
- Popular Mechanics For Kids (SYN)
- Straight Up (CBC)
- Street Cents (CBC)
- The Adventures of Shirley Holmes (YTV)

1999

- **Goosebumps** (YTV)
- Incredible Story Studio (YTV)
- Jenny and the Queen of Light (Global)
- The Inventors' Specials ("Edison:The Wizard of Light") (HBO)
- YAA! To The M@x (CBC)

==== 2000s ====
2000

- **Incredible Story Studio** (YTV)
- Popular Mechanics For Kids (SYN)
- Street Cents (CBC)
- The Worst Witch (YTV)
- YAA! To The M@x (CBC)

2001

- **Street Cents** (CBC)
- Caitlin's Way (YTV)
- I Was A Sixth Grade Alien (YTV)
- Incredible Story Studio (YTV)
- Screech Owls (YTV)

== See also ==
- Canadian television awards
