= Eimuri, Carnikava Parish =

Eimuri
- Dispersed village
- Location within Latvia
- Country: Latvia
- Municipality: Ādaži
- Parish: Carnikava

Area
  - Total: 4.62 km^{2} (1.78 sq mi)
- Elevation: 3 m (9.8 ft)

Population (2022)
  - Total: 12
  - Density: 2.6/km^{2} (6.7/sq mi)
- Postal code: LV-2163 Carnikava

Eimuri is a village in Carnikava Parish of Ādaži Municipality in the Vidzeme region of Latvia. It is located in the south of the parish, 11 kilometers from the parish center in Carnikava, 10,6 km from the municipal center of Ādaži and 28 km from Rīga.

Its population was 12 in 2022, a drop from 24 in 2015. Eimuri is adjacent to the village of the same name in neighboring Ādaži Parish.
