= Rossini's Ghost =

- Directed by: David Devine
- Written by: Heather Conkie
- Story by: David Devine; Richard Mozer
- Produced by: David Devine; Richard Mozer
- Starring: Joseph Di Mambro; Melissa Pirerra; Frances Bay; Margaret Illmann; Janee Mortil; Lally Cadeau; Tony Nardi
- Cinematography: Rick Maguire
- Edited by: Gordon McClellan
- Production company: Devine Entertainment
- Distributed by: HBO Original Films
- Release date: 1996
- Running time: 52 minutes
- Country: Canada
- Language: English

Rossini's Ghost is a 1996 HBO Original Film produced and directed by David Devine, with co-production by Richard Mozer.

== Plot ==
The story centers around Gioachino Rossini, a composer whose friends never lose faith in him—even when things go wrong. A 9-year-old girl travels back in time through a magic mirror to be his invisible assistant, overcoming the disastrous opening night of The Barber of Seville to give the world one of its most beloved operas.

== Cast ==
- Joseph Di Mambro as Gioachino Rossini
- Melissa Pirerra as Relania
- Frances Bay as Elder Rosalie
  - Margaret Illmann as Young Rosalie
- Janne Mortil as Young Martina
  - Lally Cadeau as Elder Martina
- Tony Nardi as Duke Cesarini

== Production ==
The film was shot in the small mountain town of Labin, in Istria, Croatia.

The film was released on DVD and has been watched in over 100 countries on television. The film and its corresponding Teacher's Guide is used in numerous U.S. elementary and middle schools by music teachers for music classes. Rossini's Ghost was the seventh of seven films made for HBO for the 7- to 14-year-old set, introducing them to the joys and the wonders of classical music and their composers.

=== Soundtrack ===
The CD and soundtrack, produced by David Devine for Sony MUSIC of New York, was composed by Gioachino Rossini, and was recorded at the Slovak Philharmonic Orchestra, with an 88-person symphony orchestra conducted by Ondrej Lenárd.

1. Overture to Il barbiere di Siviglia (The Barber of Seville) – 7:29
2. Overture to La scala di seta (The Silken Ladder) - 6:37
3. Overture to L'italiana in Algeri (The Italian Girl in Algiers) - 8:35
4. Overture to Semiramide - 13:11
5. Overture to Il signor Bruschino - 04:55
6. Overture to La cenerentola (Cinderella) - 8:30
7. Overture to La gazza ladra (The Thieving Magpie) - 10:17
8. Overture to Guillaume Tell (William Tell Overture) - 11:42
