= Margaret Illmann =

Australian ballerina (born 1965)

Margaret L. Illmann (born 9 December 1965) is an Australian prima ballerina with an international career.

Born in Adelaide, South Australia, she danced with The Australian Ballet between 1985 and 1989, in roles such as Beyond Twelve with Kelvin Coe, In the Night, The Three Musketeers and Giselle. She moved to Canada in 1990 to work with the National Ballet of Canada. From there her career led her to all major stages in the world as a guest artist. She worked and lived in Stuttgart and Berlin (Germany) and in Vienna (Austria).

She played Victoria Page in the 1993 musical The Red Shoes by Jule Styne on Broadway in New York City. In 1999 she returned to Australia for the first time, to dance Odette/Odile in the English National Ballet's production of Swan Lake.

She also played in films, such as Young Rosalie in Rossini's Ghost.
