= Eimuri, Ādaži Parish =

Village in Latvia

Eimuri
- Dispersed village
- Location within Latvia
- Country: Latvia
- Municipality: Ādaži
- Parish: Ādaži

Area
  - Total: 6.38 km^{2} (2.46 sq mi)
- Elevation: 5 m (16 ft)

Population (2022)
  - Total: 40
  - Density: 6.3/km^{2} (16/sq mi)
- Postal code: LV-2164 Ādaži

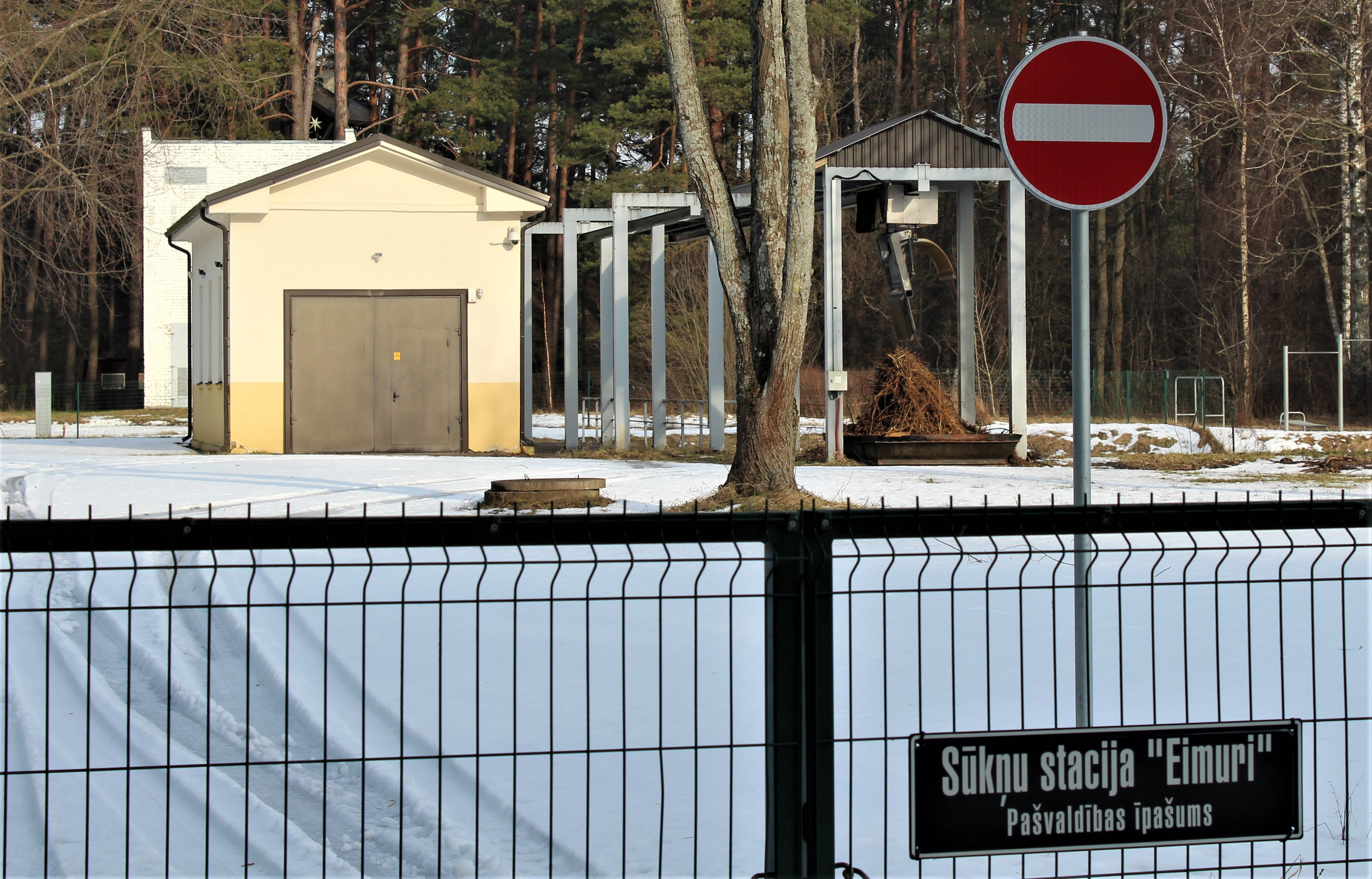

Eimuri is a village in Ādaži Parish of Ādaži Municipality in the Vidzeme region of Latvia. The village is located at the western part of the parish, 6 kilometers from Ādaži. Its population in February 2022 was 40.

During the Soviet occupation of Latvia, Eimuri was home to the Briljanti exemplary pig farm of the Ādaži Kolkhoz. Today, the area is used by the Dupleks-D ammunition factory and other businesses. Two craft breweries, Ārpus Brewing Co. and Labietis (Pagan Brews) are located in the village. The Ādaži Airfield is also located nearby.

Eimuri is adjacent to the village of the same name in neighboring Carnikava Parish.
