= Ľudovít Rajter =

Slovak conductor and composer (1906–2000)

- Rajter Lajos
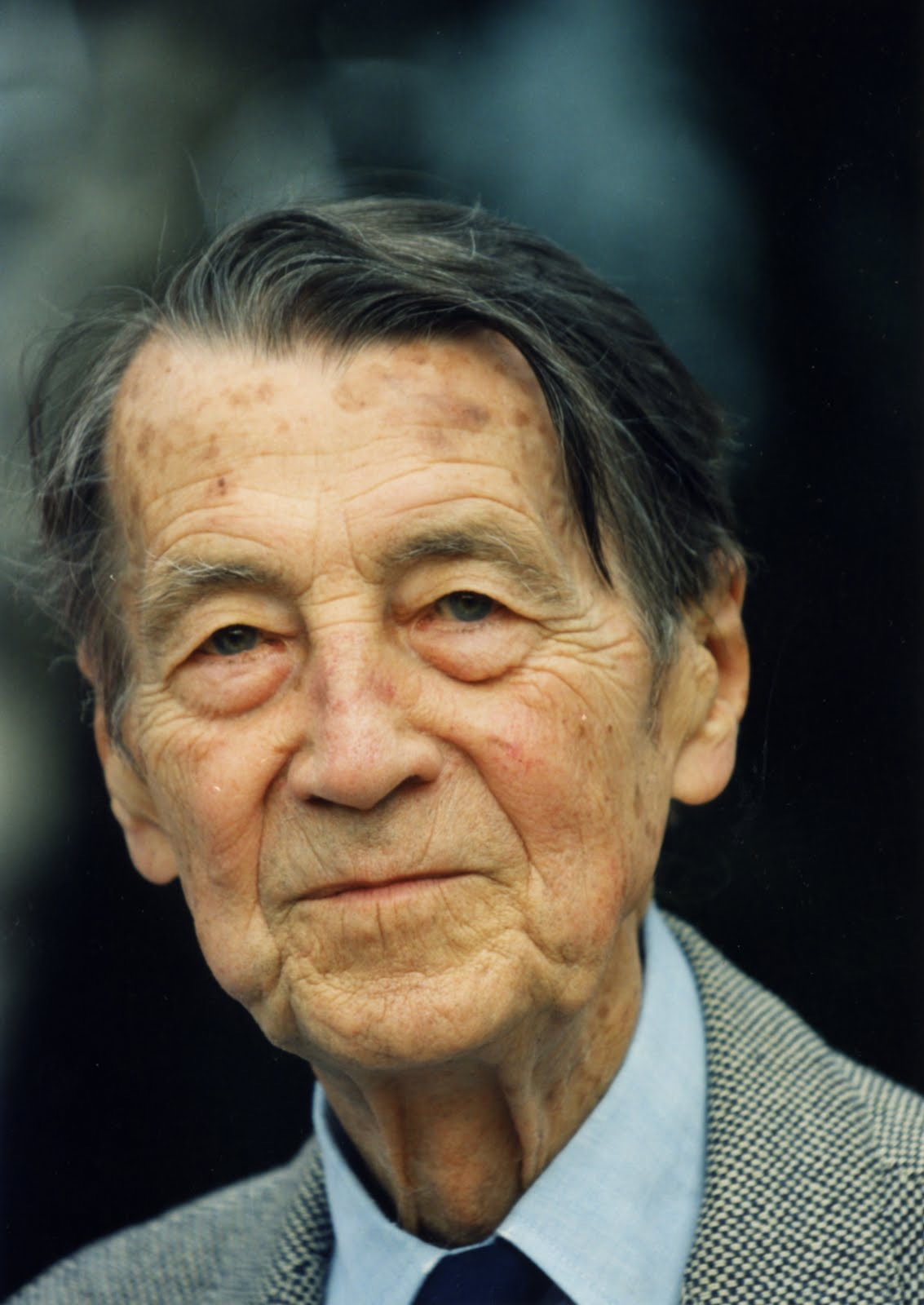
- Rajter in 1975
- Born: 30 July 1906; Pezinok, Austria-Hungary
- Died: 6 July 2000 (aged 93); Bratislava, Slovakia
- Occupation: Composer
- Partner: Alžbeta Rajterová
- Honours: See Below

Ľudovít Rajter (Hungarian: Rajter Lajos; 30 July 1906 – 6 July 2000) was a Slovak composer and conductor.

== Early life and education ==
Rajter's evangelical family had roots among the German-Hungarian and Dutch communities. His father was a teacher, cantor, and choral conductor in the Lutheran church. Rajter's family migrated from southern Germany to Hungary during the reign of Maria Theresa (1740–1780). At the time, the family surname was spelled "Raiter" or "Rayter". Rajter's family spoke Hungarian, German, and Slovak.

Rajter began his musical training with his father, Lajos Rajter Sr. (1880–1945). From 1915 to 1920, he studied with Alexander Albrecht at the Musical School for Slovakia (now Academy of Performing Arts in Bratislava). From 1924 to 1929, Rajter enrolled at the Academy of Music and Performing Arts in Vienna where he studied cello under Franz Schmidt, composition under Joseph Marx, and conducting under Clemens Krauss and Alexander Wunderer. Rajter then served as an assistant to Krauss until 1933.

== Early career ==
After completing his studies in Vienna, Rajter taught at the Municipal Music School in Bratislava and the Mozarteum Summer School in Salzburg.

In 1931, he moved to the Franz Liszt Academy of Music, located in Budapest, where he studied under Ernő Dohnányi. In January 1932, he appeared for the first time as a guest conductor on Hungarian Radio, and became its official conductor in 1934. In 1935, he became the first chief conductor of the national broadcaster in Budapest, a position he held until 1944.

During these years he also served as a professor at the Academy of Music in Budapest. Rajter conducted several European orchestras and premiered works by Hungarian composers, including Ernő Dohnányi's Symphonic Minuets.

== Later career ==
In 1946, Rajter returned to Czechoslovakia, and served as chief conductor of the Czechoslovak Radio Orchestra in Bratislava until 1949. That year, he co-founded (together with Václav Talich) the Slovak Philharmonic Orchestra, and became its first conductor. During the Stalinist period, the communist regime deemed Rajter "politically non-reliable," which led to a prohibition on his work as a conductor. After Stalin died in 1953, this restriction was lifted, and he remained with the Slovak Philharmonic Orchestra until 1961 when Ladislav Slovák succeeded him as chief conductor.

In 1966, Rajter led a conducting masterclass at the Mozarteum University in Salzburg during the Summer Academy.

In 1968, he returned as the chief conductor of the Czechoslovak Radio Symphony Orchestra, a position he held until his retirement in 1976. In 1970, he conducted Beethoven's complete cycle of nine symphonies for the first time in Bratislava, a project that earned him the Ján Levoslav Bella Prize the following year.

He taught at the newly founded Academy of Performing Arts in Bratislava from 1949 to 1976. After his rehabilitation in 1991, he was awarded the title of professor.

He remained active as a conductor well into his later years, receiving invitations to conduct foreign orchestras in the 1990s. In 1991, Hungary appointed Rajter an honorary member for life of the Symphony Orchestra in Szombathely.

== Albums (selection) ==
- Alexander Moyzes: Down The River Váh & Dances From The Hron Region, Slovak Philharmonic Orchestra (Supraphon, OPUS)
- Eugen Suchoň: Metamorfózy, Czech Philharmonic Orchestra (Supraphon, OPUS)
- Ján Cikker: Spomienky, Czech Philharmonic Orchestra (Supraphon, OPUS)
- Brahms: Symphonies 1 - 4, Slovak Philharmonic Orchestra (OPUS)
- Franz Schmidt: Symphonies 1 - 4, Czechoslovak Radio Symphony Orchestra (OPUS)
- Zemlinsky: Symphony No. 1 & Das Gläserne Herz, Czechoslovak Radio Symphony Orchestra (Marco Polo)
- Ludovit Rajter: Orchestral Works, Janáček Philharmonic Orchestra (CPO)

== Honors ==
- 1936: Dr.h.c. New York College of Music
- 1946: City of Bratislava award
- 1971: Prize of the Union of Slovak Composers
- 1987: The Gold Achievement Award of the publishing house OPUS, Bratislava (SK)
- 1989: National Artist of Czechoslovakia
- 1994: Bartók-Pásztory Award (Bartók-Pásztory-Díj)
- 1994: The Mayor of Bratislava Award
- 1996: Ján Levoslav Bella Prize
- 1997: Austrian Cross of Honour for Science and Art of the 1st Class
- 1997: Order of Ľudovít Štúr, 1st Class
- 1997: Honorary Cross for Science and Art of the Republic of Austria, 1st Class
- 1998: Crystal Wing
- 1999: Honorary chief conductor of the Slovak Philharmonic
- 2000: Honorary member of the Hungarian Academy of Arts
- 2005: Entry in the Golden Book of SOZA (Performing and Mechanical Rights Society)
- 2007: Pribina Cross of the first class / in memoriam (Pribinov kríž 1. triedy)
- 2011: Fra Angelico in memoriam Award
- 2017: Ján Cikker Price in memoriam (cena Jána Cikkera)
