= RoboRoach =

Canadian animated television series

- Genre: Adventure; Comedy; Science fiction comedy Action
- Created by: J.D. Smith; Lila Rose; Carolyn Hay
- Developed by: Andy Knight
- Directed by: Drew Edwards
- Voices of: Scott Thompson; Ted Dykstra
- Theme music composer: Paul Koffman; Tim Foy
- Opening theme: "RoboRoach" performed by Big Rude Jake
- Composer: Pure West
- Country of origin: Canada
- No. of seasons: 2
- No. of episodes: 52 (104 segments)

Production
- Executive producers: Lisa Olfman; Joy Rosen
- Producer: Julie Stall
- Running time: 22 minutes (11 minutes per segment)
- Production company: Portfolio Entertainment

Original release
- Network: Teletoon
- Release: January 8, 2002 – June 14, 2004

RoboRoach is a Canadian animated television series that aired on Teletoon in Canada, Animania HD in the United States, and Fox Kids internationally. It follows the story of a cockroach named Ruben and his brother Reginald. While scavenging for food, as seen in the opening, Ruben is caught and experimented on. His brother saves him, but when they jump into an electrical outlet, Ruben is transformed into a robot and cockroach cyborg called a roboroach. After that, he swears to use his powers only for the good of everyone and never for personal use, which is unfortunate for Reginald.

== Characters ==
=== Main ===
- Ruben "Rube" Roach (Scott Thompson), the second-born and younger of the Roach brothers, has been turned into a "super-bug" thanks to being captured and experimented on before he hopped into an electrical outlet and transformed into RoboRoach, gaining shapeshifting abilities and since that day serving as the superhero of Vexberg. He always thinks of others before himself and never accepts gifts of gratitude, and that's the reason why he and his brother live in poverty. Ruben is also quite childish, naïve and believes almost everything anyone tells him.
- Reginald "Reg" Roach (Ted Dykstra) is the firstborn and eldest of the Roach brothers who always tries to get rich, but always fails. He is overambitious and tries to use his brother's powers to obtain money, but Ruben always turns down reward offers because, as he says: "A good deed is its own reward!". That infuriates Reginald, and he is also quite selfish and bad/ill-tempered. This often causes him a lot of trouble. However, he is still Ruben's big brother regardless and there are times he can cast out his own greed and anger aside just for his big younger brother whenever he believes he might lose his brother and more, showing us he truly cares for his brother and loves him as much as Ruben does for him. His catchphrase is "Why me? Why me? Why, all the time, me?" with slight variations according to the episode.
- Mayor Mierworm is the mayor of Vexburg. She does not like Ruben or Reginald and thinks of them as menaces. Once she even tried to blame them for a crime they never committed, just to get rid of them. As a politician she is not very good, but seemingly Mayor Mierworm gets re-elected quite often.
- Skeeter Jettings is the main reporter in the series and can be found announcing the news on Reginald and Ruben's TV. His name is a spoof on Peter Jennings.
- The Police Chief is RoboRoach's friend and the chief of the police station. Also known for his giggle.
- Doc is the Roach brothers' personal physician.
- Sterling Überbucks is CEO and owner of his company "Überbucks Dynamic Concerns". He and his helper Toadie are always trying to get richer at the cost of anything. Sterling has a nephew Stewie Jr., an evil twin brother named Carling and a great-great-great-grandfather named Sterling Überrucks the Very 1st.

=== Villains ===
- Mandible Lecter, a dangerous murderer who kidnaps innocent bugs and eats them.
- Widow Black, a black widow who marries bugs.
- The Exterminator, a war-fanatic with a German accent who is considered to be a mercenary.
- F. Lee Brain, a mad scientist that is bent on conquering the world with the help of his henchman Slug.
- Ms. Conduct "The Disciplinarian", Ruben and Reginald's former teacher.

== Episodes ==
With Teletoon original airdates in parentheses:

=== Season 1 (2002) ===
1. Reg Bugs Out / Little Big Mouth (January 8, 2002)
2. Pains, Drains, and Robomobiles / Jungle Bugs (January 15, 2002)
3. Fitness Bug / Runaway Roaches (January 22, 2002)
4. Popsicle Pest / Weakened Gladiators (January 29, 2002)
5. Sugar Mommy / X-Pet (February 5, 2002)
6. Bedridden Bug / RoboRoach: The Movie (February 12, 2002)
7. Two Bugs and a Baby / Überland (February 19, 2002)
8. Santa's Bitter Helper / Flushed-Aways (February 26, 2002)
9. Robo Watch / Sins of the Teacher (March 5, 2002)
10. Rube Awakenings / Battling for Uberbucks (March 12, 2002)
11. Bug Tusslers / Death of a Salesbug (March 19, 2002)
12. Revenge of the Fleabrain / Ghost Bunglers (April 9, 2002)
13. Mite Makes Wrong / Good Deed Day (April 16, 2002)
14. The Flying Roachinis / Cowbugs (September 2, 2002)
15. Political Partying / Bugfoot Fetish (September 6, 2002)
16. Bugs with Gas / Insectizoids (September 9, 2002)
17. Vexburg 500 / Guilty Please (September 13, 2002)
18. Family Feud / Robo Reg (September 16, 2002)
19. Under the Rainbow / Bed Bug Walking (September 20, 2002)
20. Sluggies / Delivery Bugs (September 23, 2002)
21. Jockey Shorts / The RoboRoach Show (September 27, 2002)
22. The Big Bug Sleep / Prehistoric Pest (September 30, 2002)
23. Ruby's Slippers / The President's Brain Is Missing (October 4, 2002)
24. Club Dead / Omega Mites (October 7, 2002)
25. The Great Reginini / Dustmites Come Home (October 11, 2002)
26. The High Cost of Laughing / Loco Hero (October 14, 2002)

=== Season 2 (2003–04) ===
1. Shuttle Bugs / Rememberizing Rube (September 6, 2003)
2. Ship of Foods / Pipe Reams (September 7, 2003)
3. CopRoach Academy / Tooth for a Tooth (September 14, 2003)
4. Überpops / Ballwashers Championship (September 21, 2003)
5. Office Hours / Miss Vexburg (September 28, 2003)
6. The Dapper Dandies of Dusty Gulch / Of Lice and Men (October 5, 2003)
7. Spelunkheads / Giggling Island (October 12, 2003)
8. Reggie's Hero / Gourmet Rude (October 19, 2003)
9. Mystic Warbugs / X Hits the Spot (October 26, 2003)
10. The Miracle of Girth / The Purse of the Mummy (November 2, 2003)
11. A Pair au Pairs / Shocking Tales (November 9, 2003)
12. Reality Bytes / Debonairhead (November 23, 2003)
13. Elves' Night Off / Loose Sleuths (November 30, 2003)
14. Death Takes a Half Day / Übertrain (January 3, 2004)
15. The Sacrificial Ham / Bug Brother Is Watching (January 4, 2004)
16. Space Cadets / Love Bugs (January 11, 2004)
17. WereRoach / Remote Control Roach (January 18, 2004)
18. No Pain No Weight Gain / El Regidente (January 25, 2004)
19. Sins of the Teacher II / Robo Reunion (February 1, 2004)
20. Opposites Detract / Robo Nurse (February 8, 2004)
21. Night of the Living Beds / Superhero Sampler (March 7, 2004)
22. Reggie's Eleven / Easter Charade (March 14, 2004)
23. It's a Mad, Mad, Mad Reg / Gold Fever (March 21, 2004)
24. Spitting Images / Youth Juice (June 12, 2004)
25. The Living Bro / The Fly Who Loved Me (June 13, 2004)
26. Road to Ubugme / Ticking Time Bug (June 14, 2004)

== Production ==
The series is based on true stories about Japanese scientists who implanted cameras and mini-computers in cockroaches and sent them into disaster zones to look for life signs.

A 26-episode third season of the show was announced in early 2003, but was never produced. Disney Media Distribution owns the show's international rights.

== Notes ==
The show Extermination! in the episode "Battling for Uberbucks / Death of a Salesbug" is a play on the reality show Survivor. The episode "Revenge of the Fleabrain" parodies Superman. The episode "Ghost Bunglers" is based on the Ghostbusters film series.

The episode "The Fly Who Loved Me" is based on the 1977 film The Spy Who Loved Me.
