= Tod Fennell =

Canadian actor (born 1984)

- Born: October 18, 1984 (age 41); Montreal, Quebec, Canada
- Occupation: Actor
- Years active: 1991–present
- Website: www.todfennell.com

Tod Fennell (born October 18, 1984) is a Canadian film, voice, and television actor. He was born in Montreal, Quebec.

== Career ==
Fennell's passion for acting inspired him to attend the Montreal Children's Theater at age five. He speaks English and French.

Fennell had the lead in Nicholas Kendall's film Kayla (1997). Variety wrote about his performance: "In the central role, Fennell is memorable, managing to make the rather self-centered Sam interesting".

Fennell was a series regular on the children's television series Lassie (1997–1999).

Fennell portrayed Taro in the 2021 video game Kena: Bridge of Spirits.

== Filmography ==
=== Film ===
- Because Why (1993) – Zachary
- Brainscan (1994) – Young Michael
- Handel's Last Chance (1996) – Jamie O'Flaherty
- Kayla (1998) – Sam Mackenzie
- Ultimate G's: Zac's Flying Dream (2000) – Carl
- Levity (2003)
- The Reagans (2003) – Teenage Michael
- End of the Line (2007) – Conrad
- The Spiderwick Chronicles (2008) – Helen's Co-worker
- Wushu Warrior (2008) – Jonathan Elders
- Exploding Sun (2013) – Guard
- Warm Bodies (2013) Armed Patrol (uncredited)
- April and the Extraordinary World (2015) – Julius (voice)
- Racetime (2019) – Piers (English version, voice)
- Arthur, malédiction – Alex (English version, voice)

=== Television ===
- Million Dollar Babies (1994)
- Are You Afraid of the Dark? Mark/Jim Gregory (episode: "The Tale of the Forever Game" & "The Tale of the Silver Light: Parts 1, 2, & 3")
- Sirens (1995)
- Lassie (1997–1999) – Jeff Mackenzie
- My Hometown (1998)
- Goosebumps (1998) – Billy Deep (episode: "Deep Trouble: Parts 1 & 2")
- The Worst Witch (1998) – Spooky (episode: "Great Outdoors")
- Big Wolf on Campus (2002) – Kyle (episode: "Thanks")
- Mental Block (2003) – McHattie
- The 4400 (2007) – Troy Kennedy (episode: "Fear Itself")
- The Festival
- The Mysteries of Alfred Hedgehog
- Blue Mountain State (2010) – Evan (episode "Rivalry Weekend")
- The Art of More (2016) – Cliff Kerbis (episode "Hikor")
- 21 Thunder (2018)

=== Video games ===
- Kena: Bridge of Spirits (2021) – Taro
- Monster Hunter Stories 2: Wings of Ruin (2021) – Cheval
- Far Cry New Dawn (2019) – Bean
- The Division 2 (2019)
- Ghost Recon Breakpoint (2019)
- Assassin's Creed 3 (2012) – Mason Weems
- Assassin's Creed 2 (2009) – Bernardo Baroncelli
- Assassin's Creed: Rogue (2014) – George Washington
