= Mulroney: The Opera =

- Directed by: Larry Weinstein
- Written by: Dan Redican
- Produced by: Jessica Daniel; Larry Weinstein
- Music by: Alexina Louie
- Production company: Rhombus Media
- Distributed by: Alliance
- Release date: 16 April 2011
- Running time: 75 minutes
- Country: Canada
- Language: English
- Budget: $3.8 million (CAD)

Mulroney: The Opera is a satirical Canadian film about former prime minister Brian Mulroney. The film, budgeted at $3.8 million (CAD), is directed by Larry Weinstein, who previously worked on nine operas with Dan Redican and Alexina Louie.

== Cast ==
- Brian Mulroney: Rick Miller
- Mila Mulroney: Stephanie Mills
- Jean Chrétien: Colin Mochrie
- Pierre Trudeau: Wayne Best
- Ed Broadbent: Ted Dykstra
- Ronald Reagan: Joe Matheson
- Nancy Reagan: Janet-Laine Green
- John Allen Fraser: Dan Lett
- Robert Coates: Seán Cullen
- Kim Campbell: Joanne Boland
- John Turner: Geordie Johnson
- Col. Robert R. McCormick: Michael Murphy
- Fake Historian: Dan Redican
- Debate Moderator: Patrick McKenna
- Young Brian: Eamon Stocks

== Reception ==
The film received mixed reviews. Torontoist deemed it the "most recognizably Canadian comedy ever". Greg Quill of the Toronto Star panned the production as "a fiasco, a flame-out for sure, but an epic failure". The Globe and Mail praised the film for having "overwhelming ambition, hyperbole, pathos, satire and politics with clever writing, skilled acting, great voices and compelling music".
