= Vladimir Verbitsky =

Russian-Australian conductor (born 1943)

Vladimir Igorevich Verbitsky (Russian: Владимир Игоревич Вербицкий; born 1943) is a Soviet and Australian conductor.

He was born in Leningrad. He studied piano and conducting at the St. Petersburg Conservatory. He has been chief conductor of the Voronezh Philharmonic Orchestra since 1972, and conducts other Russian orchestras. From 1982 to 1984 he was the chief conductor of the Slovak Philharmonic. He has recorded widely.

Russian President Vladimir Putin has decorated Verbitsky with the award of People's Artist of Russia.

Verbitsky became an Australian citizen on 6 June 2009.

== Sources ==
- Saint-Petersburg Academic Philharmonic
- Maxima
- Jonathan Wentworth Associated Ltd.
