= Inauguration of Zuzana Čaputová =

2019 Presidential Inauguration of Zuzana Čaputová
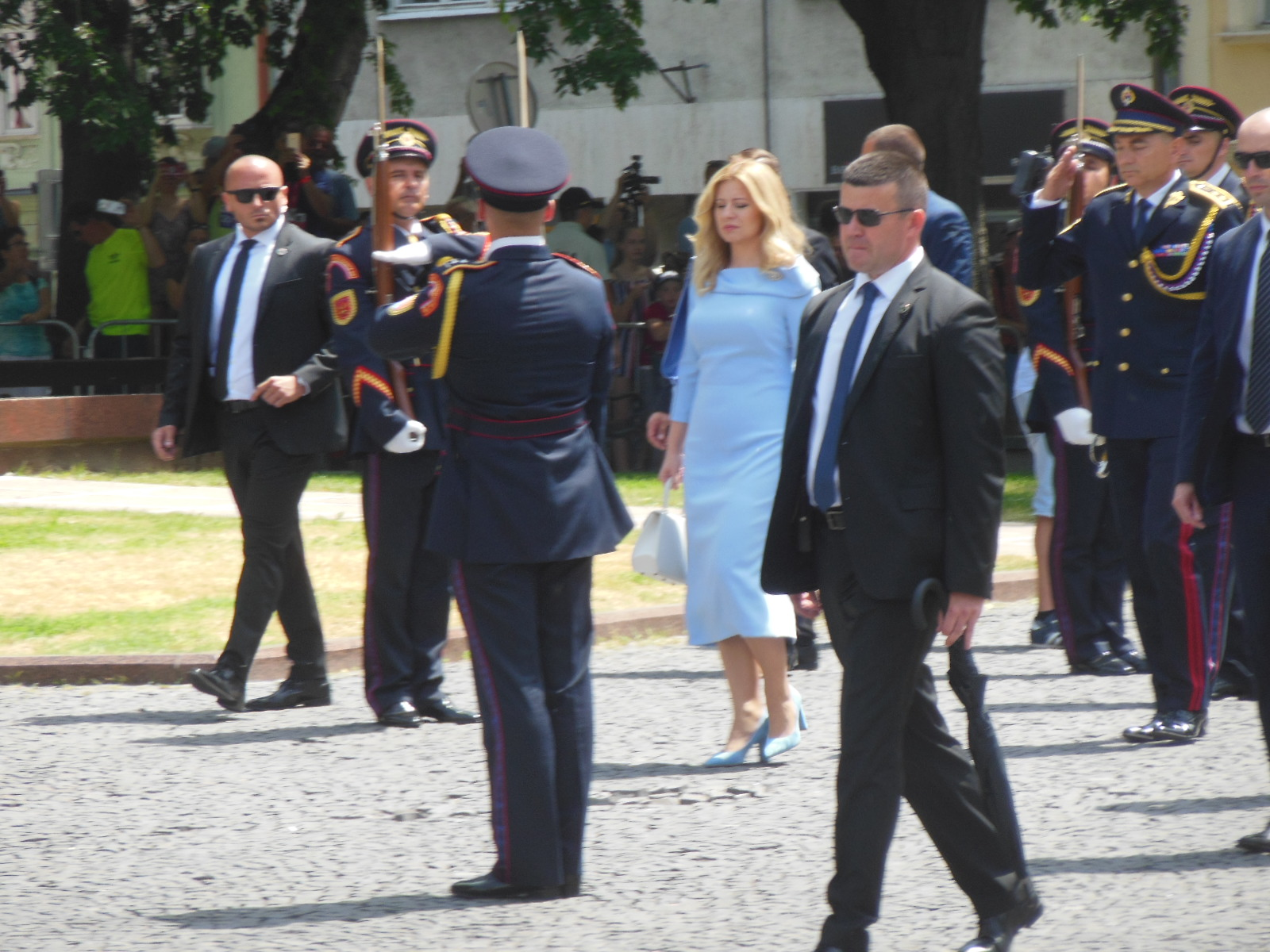
- Zuzana Čaputová at her inauguration
- Date: June 15, 2019; 7 years ago
- Time: 11:45 pm (CEST)
- Location: Slovak Philharmonic Bratislava, Slovakia
- Organized by: National Council of the Slovak Republic
- Participants: Zuzana Čaputová; 5th president of the Slovak Republic — Assuming office Andrej Danko; Speaker of the National Council — Leading meeting Ivan Fiačan; Head of the Constitutional court — Necessary for the oath

The inauguration of Zuzana Čaputová was held on Saturday 15 June 2019 at 11:45 AM in the Slovak Philharmonic in Bratislava the capital of Slovakia. It took place during a solemn session of the National Council, the highest law-making institution in Slovakia. Čaputová assumed office by taking an oath on the constitution and into the hands of the Chief Justice of The Constitutional Court of Slovakia, Ivan Fiačan.

== Inauguration in Reduta ==
The ceremony - a solemn meeting of the Slovak parliament led by its speaker, Andrej Danko, took place in the Reduta building of the Slovak Philharmonic, located at Eugen Suchoň Square, Old Town, Bratislava.

Čaputová was sworn-in at 12:07 pm, despite the fact that the Constitution of the Slovak Republic states that the new president is supposed to be inaugurated exactly at midday. This error arose due to the unscheduled address by Andrej Danko, as a speech given by the speaker has not been a tradition before.

The oath of the president of the Slovak Republic is described in Constitution of Slovakia (article 104, paragraph 1) as follows:

On my honor and conscience, I promise to be loyal to the Slovak Republic. I will take care of the welfare of the Slovak nation, national minorities and ethnic groups living in the Slovak Republic. I will carry out my duties in the interest of the citizens and will uphold and defend the Constitution and other laws.

— Constitution of Slovakia

Čaputová then signed the oath. the Chief Justice of Constitutional Court proclaimed that everything was in accordance with the law (in case of refusing to swear an oath or swearing it partially or with any personal reservation, the constitution commands an annulation of the presidential election) and declared Čaputová president of the Republic for a five year term. The national anthem Nad Tatrou sa blýska followed by a 21-gun salute sounding at the same time from the waterfront of the Danube, while the presidential standard was being raised on the top of the Grassalkovich Palace. After this, Čaputová delivered her inaugural speech.

== Following program ==
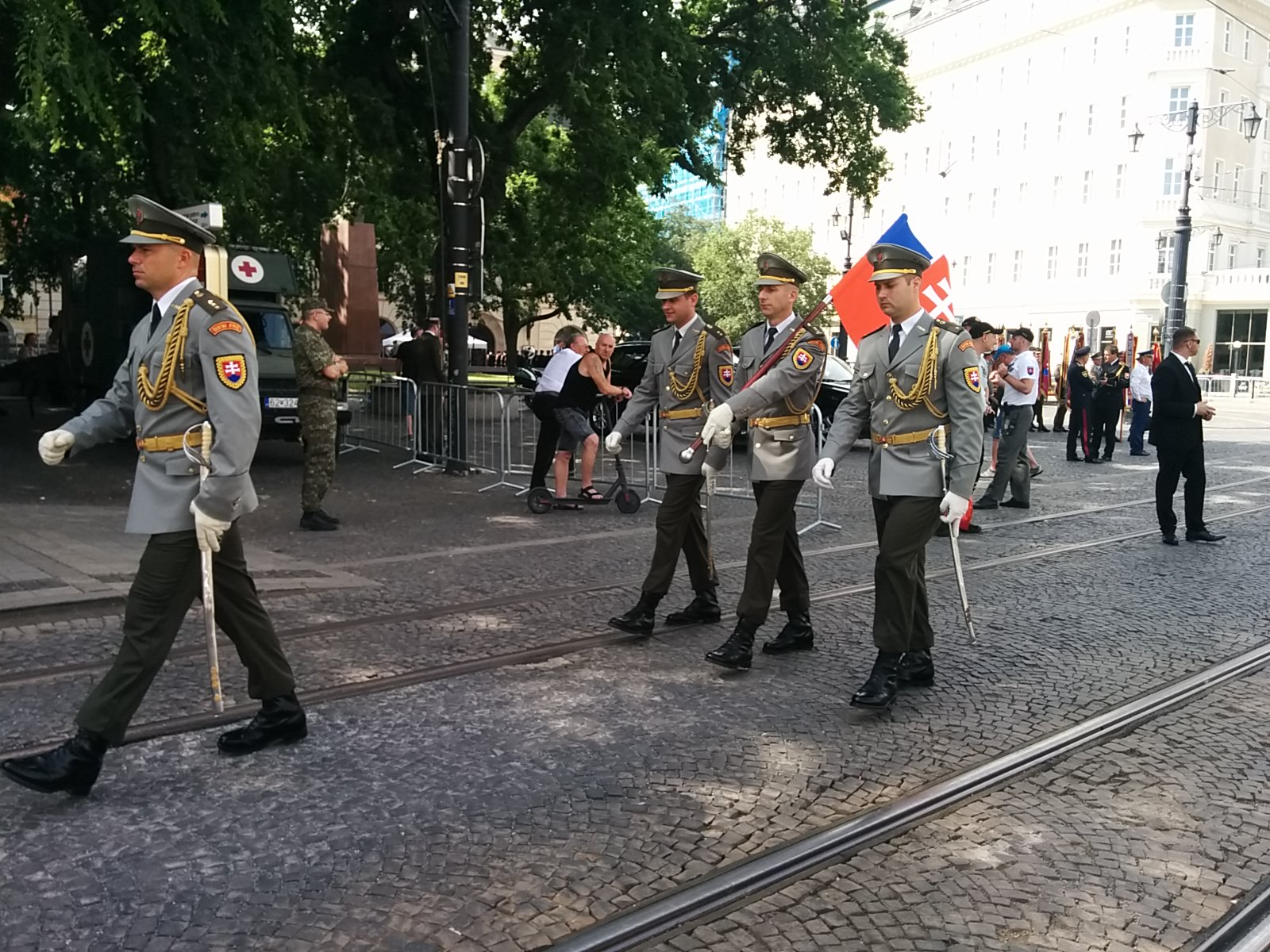
The Honour Guard of the Slovak Armed Forces during the inaugural military ceremony.

Zuzana Čaputová became the commander-in-chief of the Slovak Armed Forces immediately after the inauguration, the military parade was held in front of the Slovak National Theatre at the Hviezdoslav's square led by Chief of the General Staff of the Slovak Armed Forces, Lieutenant General Daniel Zmeko.

After the military parade, the President walked through streets of Bratislava to the St Martin's Cathedral. It was the first chance for citizens to see and meet the new president. The Te Deum was celebrated in the cathedral, led by Roman Catholic Archbishop Stanislav Zvolenský, with representatives of the Evangelical Church of the Augsburg Confession, the Reformed Church, the Eastern Orthodox Church, the Jewish Community of Bratislava and other churches and religious communions attending.

Čaputová then symbolically received administration of the palace and the office from previous president, Andrej Kiska. Immediately after, a lunch was served at the Presidential palace, attended by seniors from around Slovakia, with Čaputová serving the first course.

Her next steps led to the wreath laying ceremony at Freedom Memorial in Devín, and to the grave of the first president of Slovakia Michal Kováč at St Andrew's cemetery in Bratislava. The post-inauguration program was finalized with a private reception in Reduta.

== See also ==
- 2019 Slovak presidential election
- Zuzana Čaputová
