= Ted Dykstra =

Canadian playwright and actor (born 1961)

- Born: 1961 (age 64–65); Chatham-Kent, Ontario, Canada
- Occupations: Actor, playwright
- Years active: 1980–present
- Spouse(s): Melanie Doane; Diana Bentley
- Children: 3

Ted Dykstra (born 1961) is a Canadian playwright and actor.

== Early life ==
He was born in Chatham-Kent, Ontario in 1961 and grew up in St. Albert, Alberta.

== Career ==
He is a founding member of Soulpepper Theatre Company. His writing credits include Two Pianos Four Hands, Dorian, and Evangeline. His acting performances include Bach in Bach's Fight for Freedom and Ed Broadbent in Mulroney: The Opera, as well as some voice work. Dykstra voices Dad Tiger in Daniel Tiger's Neighborhood and Reg in RoboRoach.

In 2003, he formed an independent record label Actorboy Records with Gary Sinise. He was formerly married to Melanie Doane with two children, Theo and Rosie. He is currently married to Diana Bentley with one child, Henry.

=== Coal Mine Theatre ===
Dykstra and his wife Diana Bentley are co-directors of Coal Mine Theatre.

== Filmography ==
=== Television ===
Year	Title	Role	Notes
1980	Amber Waves		Television film
1985	The Littlest Hobo		TV series, 1 episode
1985	The Cuckoo Bird	Mike	Television film
1985	Home Free	Son	Television film
1986	Seeing Things	Jeffrey Tate	TV series, 1 episode
1989	Street Legal	Crown Davidson	TV series, 1 episode
1989	Final Notice	Gerald Arthur	Television film
1990	The Kissing Place	Terry	Television film
1991	Katts and Dog	Frank Tesh	TV series, 1 episode
1992; 2005	Heritage Minutes	Sergeant Major John Osborn / Additional cast	TV series, 2 episodes
1993	Life With Billy	Alan Ferrier	Television film
1994	RoboCop	Joe Avery	TV series, 2 episodes
1994–1996	Side Effects	Dr. Seymour Allen	TV series, 12 episodes
1995	Bach's Fight for Freedom	Bach	Television film
1999	Murder Most Likely	Undercover Officer	Television film
2002–2004	RoboRoach	Reg	TV series, 52 episodes
2003	Shattered City: The Halifax Explosion	Francis Mackey	TV series, 2 episodes
2004	Wonderfalls	Muse (Narrator)	TV series, 7 episodes
2005	Missing	Mr. Truman	TV series, 1 episode
2006	Angela's Eyes	David Larson	TV series, 1 episode
2008	The Englishman's Boy	Hank	Miniseries, 2 episodes
2011	Republic of Doyle	Jody Redmond	TV series, 1 episode
2011	Wingin' It	Beethoven	TV series, 1 episode
2012	Detentionaire	Narrator	TV series, 1 episode
2012–present	Daniel Tiger's Neighborhood	Dad Tiger	TV series, 114 episodes
2013	Hemlock Grove	Francis Pullman	TV series, 9 episodes
2013–2015	The Day My Butt Went Psycho!	The Great White Butt	26 episodes
2014	Remedy	Forrest Woods	TV series, 1 episode
2015	Beauty and the Beast	Hargrove	TV series, 1 episode
2016	Tactical Girls	Colonel McCullough	TV series, 1 episode
2016	Winston Steinburger and Sir Dudley Ding Dong	Narrator	TV series, 1 episode
2017	Reign	Lord Maxford	TV series, 1 episode
2017	The Mist	Philip Carlin	TV series, 1 episode
2017	Orphan Black	Doctor	TV series, 2 episodes
2018	Carter	Chuck Hancock	TV series, 1 episode
2018	The Daniel Tiger Movie: Won't You Be Our Neighbor?	Dad Tiger	Television film
2021	The Expanse: One Ship	Gareth	TV series, 1 episode
2021–2022	The Expanse	Gareth	TV series, 6 episodes
2023	Transplant	Eric	TV series, 1 episode
2024	Percy Jackson and the Olympians	Augustus	TV series, 1 episode
2024	Murdoch Mysteries	Charlie Hall	TV series, 1 episode

=== Film ===
Year	Title	Role	Notes
1986	The Boy in Blue	Hanlan Man #1	Cameo
1992	Giant Steps	Graeme Gaines	Main cast
1994	Soft Deceit	Don Froese	Main cast
2002	Black Swan	Clive	Main role
2008	Pavane	Jay	Short
2009	The Deaths of Chet Baker	Henk	Short
2011	Mulroney: The Opera	Ed Broadbent	Main cast
2017	Supers	Candy Clown	Short
2018	Fahrenheit 451	Van Gogh	Cameo
2020	Ludo	Ludo's Dad	Cameo
2021	2 Pianos 4 Hands	Ted	Direct-to-video film, co-director, writing
2022	Happy FKN Sunshine	Eddy	Main role

== Stage ==
Title
Bedroom Farce
The Norman Conquests
The Sunshine Boys
Billy Bishop Goes to War
The Glass Menagerie
Leaving Home
Salt-Water Moon
Of the Fields Lately
Jitters
Fool For Love
Under Milk Wood
The Dumb Waiter
Rosencrantz and Guildenstern Are Dead
The Kreutzer Sonata
American Buffalo
A Chorus of Disapproval
The Government Inspector
Twelfth Night
Evangeline
2 Pianos, 4 Hands
