= Kyle Labine =

Canadian actor (born 1983)

- Born: Jonathan Kyle Labine; April 7, 1983 (age 42); Brampton, Ontario, Canada
- Occupation: Actor
- Years active: 1990–2019
- Spouse: Sophie Ann Rooney (m. 2007)

Jonathan Kyle Labine (born April 7, 1983) is a Canadian former actor. His brothers Tyler Labine and Cameron Labine are also actors.

Labine grew up in Maple Ridge, British Columbia, where he attended Fairview Elementary and Maple Ridge Secondary School. He has been married to Sophie Ann Rooney since 2007.

== Filmography ==
=== Film ===
Year	Title	Role	Notes
1995	Bach's Fight for Freedom	Frederick Muller	
1996	Big Bully	Stevie	
2000	Mr. Rice's Secret	Jonathan	
2002	Spooky House	Dumb Dave	
2002	Halloween: Resurrection	Teen Party Guy	
2003	Freddy vs. Jason	Bill Freeburg	
2004	The Perfect Score	Dave	
2006	Crossed	JD	
2007	Blonde and Blonder	Porter	
2008	Shred	Mikey	Video
2008	Bollywood Beckons	Thief Todd	Short
2009	Revenge of the Boarding School Dropouts	Mikey	Direct to video
2011	388 Arletta Avenue	Co-Worker #1	
2013	Crystal Lake Memories: The Complete History of Friday the 13th	Himself	Documentary film
2019	Scary Stories to Tell in the Dark	Deputy Hobbs	

=== Television ===
Year	Title	Role	Notes
1990–92	Madeline	Pepito (voice)	
1990–96	Road to Avonlea	Davey Keith	Recurring role
1991	E.N.G.	Benji	Episode: "Ways and Means"
1995	Darkstalkers	Harry Grimoire (voice)	13 episodes
1996	Goosebumps	Evan Ross	2 episodes
1997	Dog's Best Friend	Sam Handel	Television film
1997	The Outer Limits	Joe	Episode: "Dark Rain"
1998	Dead Man's Gun	Billy Neuhouser	Episode: "Sheep's Clothing"
2000	Ratz	Rod	Television film
2000	Da Vinci's Inquest	Speed	Episode: "Do You Wanna Dance"
2002	I Was a Teenage Faust	Randy	Television film
2003	The Twilight Zone	Ben Jordan	Episode: "Into the Light"
2003	X-Men: Evolution	David Haller / Lucas (voice)	Episode: "Sins of the Son"
2004	Crazy Canucks	Dave Murray	Television film
2004	The L Word	Gus	Episode: "Losing It"
2005	Falcon Beach	Scott	Television film
2006	Falcon Beach	Scott	Episode: "Starting Over"
2007	Flash Gordon	Craig	Episode: "Conspiracy Theory"
2007–08	Grand Star	Kurt Masters	Main role
2008	Ogre	Terry	Television film
2008	Reaper	Kendall	Episode: "Acid Queen"
2008	Samurai Girl	Otto	TV miniseries
2010	Shattered	Blake Johnson	Episode: "The Sins of Fathers"
2012	Lost Girl	Tony	Episode: "Table for Fae"
2012	King	Scott Spivak	Episode: "Aurora O'Donnell"
2012	Alphas	Eddie	Episode: "The Devil Will Drag You Under"
2013	Murdoch Mysteries	Russell Bowes	Episode: "Murdoch and the Cloud of Doom"
