= David Devine (director) =

- Born: Toronto, Ontario, Canada
- Education: Victoria College; UCLA School of Theater, Film and Television
- Occupations: Film director; producer; original content creator
- Years active: 1982–present
- Spouse: Jane Devine
- Children: 1 daughter

David Devine is a film director and producer, specialising in children's films. He was the co-founder and CEO of Devine Entertainment between 1994 and 2009, where he created original content for film, television and digital media. David’s films have been sold into 110 countries and have been watched by over 150 Million people.

Devine had his first success directing and producing Raffi's concert videos for Disney and dvd release. Subsequent highlights of his producer/director career include Beethoven Lives Upstairs, Einstein: Light to the Power of Two, Galileo: On the Shoulders of Giants, Degas and the Dancer, Edison: The Wizard of Light for HBO and Bailey's Billion$ for theatrical release. Devine has also been a hands-on creator and producer of 16 symphonic soundtracks for his films and six CDs distributed on the Sony Classical label. As Producer, his CDs include 82 member symphony recordings of Bach, Strauss, Handel, Bizet, Rossini and Liszt. Devine has been focused on addressing important creative, social and cultural issues in his films and digital media throughout his directing and producing career.

His 19 HBO Original films have received 11 nominations for Emmy Awards (winning five) and 26 nominations for The Canadian Screen Awards Gemini Awards (winning six) amongst a total of 100 other worldwide film awards. By December 2025, his films had been broadcast in over 110 countries including Canada, the USA, Central and South America, Western and Eastern EUROPE, China, Japan, Russia, 32 Middle Eastern countries with 4 million DVDs sold - 90% in the USA. Since 2004, 1,000,000 of these DVDs have been used by teachers in elementary and middle school classrooms in the U.S. and Canada and over 800,000 DVDs have been sold to U.S. parents of elementary and middle school aged home schoolers. Sales continue digitally via streaming online delivery and DVDs sold on Amazon.com.

== Early life ==
David Devine was born in Toronto, Ontario. He is the son of Hugh Brian and Beverley (née Brown) Devine. His father emigrated from Belfast to Toronto. He attended Northview Heights Collegiate Institute. In the early 1970’s. he showed an aptitude for playing music.

Devine attended Victoria College in the University of Toronto, where he studied with his literary hero, Professor Northrop Frye. Devine graduated with an Honors B.A. in 1976. As a student he was the editor of the University Newspaper, The Strand.

He started his career working for CBC Television as an investigative researcher on the television shows: The Ombudsman and The Fifth Estate. He then returned to university to pursue his graduate degree at the UCLA School of Theater, Film and Television, graduating with an MFA in Film Production and Directing. Devine attended lectures with Eugène Ionesco at the UCLA Theatre school. He also attended classes at the UCLA Graduate School of Management (Now The UCLA Anderson School of Management) studying entertainment business with Peter Guber, Sir Alan Parker, Lord David Puttnam and Robert Bookman. Devine's Project Three film at UCLA, co-produced and co-directed with creative partner Lon Diamond, starred Robin Williams and David Letterman. David's UCLA thesis film, Jeeves Takes Charge, was optioned from Sir Andrew Lloyd Webber and choreographed by Gillian Lynne and rehearsed at the RSC in Stratford-upon- Avon.

== Film career ==
Upon graduating, Devine's first break was working as John Candy's Associate Producer for Big City Comedy, produced by NBC/CTV Television Network and the Osmond Family. He followed this success with producing and directing "the making of" the comedy film, Strange Brew on set with Rick Moranis and Dave Thomas (actor). Devine was then invited to direct two immersive rock-and-roll satellite specials for Michael Cohl and Bill Ballard starring Brian Setzer and the Stray Cats and the Chris De Burgh band.

David later Produced, Directed and Edited the One Hour Television Special ‘Indian Time’ - an all indigenous Comedy and Music Special filmed in Winnipeg, Manitoba which won The Best Variety/Music Special of the year in Canada.

David then produced and directed the successful classic children's Raffi videos, A Young Children's Concert with Raffi and Raffi and the Rise and Shine Band.

He next directed and produced the children's film drama, Beethoven Lives Upstairs, and won the Prime Time Emmy Award for Outstanding Children's Program.

Devine subsequently created a NASDAQ and TSX publicly traded company, Devine Entertainment, which established itself as a multiple Emmy Award and Gemini Award winning corporation. HBO Original Programming led by Sheila Nevins requested David to create original dramatic entertainment for the 7 to 12 year-old niche market. During this time, David managed companies in four different countries and utilized over 1000 creative employees making 19 HBO Original films over 13 years. David has always worked closely with his co-producing partner, Richard Mozer, who he met in 1977 when Devine started film classes at UCLA and Mozer started film classes at the USC School of Cinematic Arts. David Devine's first choice for filming was Beethoven Lives Upstairs in Prague where the Miloš Forman (Amadeus) film crew was hired nearly intact. The next six HBO films were shot in the Český Krumlov Castle and the Jindřichův Hradec Castle, both in Bohemia, as well as in the town of Telč and Kroměříž in Moravia. The films were produced and financed by Devine Entertainment, Sony Classical, HBO Original Films of New York with The Family Channel of Toronto. Further locations were found throughout Czechia and Slovakia as well as Istria in Croatia. Even a Roman Coliseum was rented in Pula, Croatia. Devine oversaw symphonic music production for all of the films and produced 6 classical CD recordings distributed by Sony Classical of New York, led by Peter Gelb. One of his loves was directing the ballet sequences with principal dance members of the National Ballet of Canada and the Czech National Ballet for his films, Rossini's Ghost, Bizet's Dream and Degas and the Dancer. Choreography for Rossini's Ghost and Bizet's Dream were by Stelio Calagias.

A further six films were made back in Czechia and Slovakia, as well as the castle owned by Desmond Guinness in Dublin, Ireland. Devine also rented the entire piazza in Feltre, Italy for his film Leonardo: A Dream of Flight. His next film Galileo: On the Shoulders of Giants was filmed in the castle of Monselice, the Padova Anatomical theatre—the first medical theatre to teach dissection built in 1596 and the Doge's Palace, Venice. Sales continued worldwide and the films were licensed again in Canada by YTV and subsequently TVO, TFO and Radio Canada. By this time, broadcast sales crossed over the 90 country mark. In all, Devine's HBO Original films on Great Composers, Inventors and Artists utilized locations in 6 countries comprising 5 palaces and 8 castles.

Seeking to expand sales and distribution of the children's films, Devine Distribution was formed to distribute directly to Canadian and U.S. parents and their children, Canadian schools and libraries and U.S. schools and libraries. Over 1,000,000 DVDs have been sold directly to US and Canadian teachers and librarians.

Devine produced and directed the family feature film aimed at the 4-7 year olds, Bailey's Billion$. The film had a theatrical debut in Canada, the US and Russia and has sold 450,000 DVD copies. It is currently being broadcast on television in 24 foreign countries and is a consistent VOD entertainment on Canadian Specialty Channels.

David acted as Executive Producer to the prime time dramatic mini-series, Across the River to Motor City for Educated Pictures. It was shown in prime time in Canada for the CHUM Group. It was nominated for 7 Gemini Awards including best mini-series. Also in 2008, Devine Distribution bought the rights to a 4 DVD collection on the history of music starring and hosted by Wynton Marsalis called Marsalis on Music.

In 2023, David developed the feature film screenplay, The Runner for production in the summer of 2027.

The Runner is based on Billy Sherring - the only Canadian to ever win the Olympic gold medal in the Marathon at the 1906 Athens Games.

Devine has also directed 5 films on Holocaust survivors living in Canada produced by his business partner, Richard Mozer, for Naomi Azrieli and David Azrieli's Foundation.

== The Madcap Learning Adventure ==
David was the President and Founder of The Madcap Learning Adventure from 2012 to 2017. Members of the Board of Directors included Sir Ken Robinson, Sir Michael Barber and MIT's Dr. Peter Senge. The company's primary objective was to deliver learning outcomes for students and teachers mainly in U.S. K-12 schools. Madcap's goal was to provide the complete curriculum and make it available to all students on their cell phone or pad or any other device all days at any time to improve learning at a vast rate.

The Madcap Learning Adventure's initial funding came from the Bill & Melinda Gates Foundation and Pearson Education. Madcap was a digital and interactive education knowledge company which produced pedagogical resources for teachers and film, animation and interactive non-linear content modules for K-12 students. Modular prototypes were delivered from a web portal by streaming broadband to all forms of mobile devices.

Testing in the classroom took place in Brunswick, Maine and in Toronto, Ontario and results were published in a 98-page Independent pilot study conducted by the University of Maine's Graduate School of Education.

The Madcap Learning Adventures' digital proof-of-concept results confirmed vastly improved student learning outcomes when used instead of textbooks. Madcap could not create the desired sales needed to cause further growth because all textbook companies chose to continue to sell textbooks rather than advancing into 21st Century digital learning. The company closed in mid 2017.

== Filmography ==
Year	Title		Credited as		Notes
Year	Series	Title	Director	Producer	Notes
1985	A Young Children's Concert with Raffi		Yes	Yes	
1988	Raffi in Concert with the Rise and Shine Band		Yes	Yes	
1989	Indian Time		Yes	Yes	
1992	Beethoven Lives Upstairs		Yes	Yes	
1994	Composers' Specials	Bizet's Dream	Yes	Yes	also as writer
1995	Composers' Specials	Strauss: The King of 3/4 Time	No	Yes	also as writer
1995	Composers' Specials	Bach's Fight for Freedom	No	Yes	also as writer
1996	Inventors' Specials	Einstein: Light to the Power of 2	Yes	Yes	also Story by
1996	Composers' Specials	Rossini's Ghost	Yes	Yes	also as writer
1996	Composers' Specials	Liszt's Rhapsody	No	Yes	also as writer
1996	Inventors' Specials	Leonardo: A Dream of Flight	No	Yes.	also Story by
1996	Composers' Specials	Handel's Last Chance	No	Yes	also as writer
1997	Inventors' Specials	Marie Curie: More Than Meets the Eye	No	Yes	also Story by
1997	Inventors' Specials	Newton: A Tale of Two Isaacs	No	Yes	also Story by
1997	Inventors' Specials	Galileo: On the Shoulders of Giants	Yes	Yes	also story by
1998	Artists' Specials	Degas and the Dancer	Yes	Yes	also story by
1998	Inventors' Specials	Edison: The Wizard of Light	Yes	Yes	also story by
1999	Artists' Specials	Rembrandt: Fathers & Sons	Yes	Yes	also Story by
1999	Artists' Specials	Winslow Homer: An American Original	No	Yes	also Story by
1999	Artists' Specials	Monet: Shadow and Light	Yes	Yes	also Story by
1999	Artists' Specials	Mary Cassatt: An American Impressionist	No	Yes	also Story by
1999	Artists' Specials	Goya: Awakened in a Dream	No	Yes	also Story by
2005	Bailey's Billion$		Yes	Yes	

== Selected film honors and awards ==
A Young Children's Concert with Raffi

- 1986 Gold Parents' Choice Award – Best Children's Television
- Classic Parents' Choice Award – Best Children's Program of the Decade
- 1986 American Library Association Honor for Best Children's Program

Raffi in Concert with the Rise and Shine Band

- 1990 Gemini Award for Best Children's or Youth Program or Series
- 1990 Grammy Award Nomination for Best Children's CD

Beethoven Lives Upstairs

- 4 nominations in the Gemini Awards including Best Film
- 1993 Primetime Emmy Award for Outstanding Children's Program
- American Library Association Honor for Best Children's Film
- Selected for the Permanent Collection at the Paley Center for Media, New York.
- Winner of the New England Film & Video Festival, Boston
- Winner of the Monitor Award for Best Director – Children's Program, David Devine
- Award of Excellence presented by the United States National Board of Review
- American Film Association Blue Ribbon Winner – Best Original Children's Program
- 2 United States International Film and Video Festival Gold Camera Awards for – Best Director and Best Children's Film
- The Dove Foundation – Best Children's Film

Bizet's Dream

- 1997 Award for Excellence from the Alliance for Children and Television

Handel's Last Chance

- 1997 Gemini Award for Best Children's or Youth Program or Series

The Composers' Specials

- 2000 American Library Association recommendation to all public schools and libraries
- 1996 CableACE Award – Best Children's Series
- Kids First! Awards – Best Children's films – from the Coalition for Quality Children's films in the United States

Einstein: Light to the Power of Two

- 1998 Parents' Choice Award
- 1998 Award of Excellence for Best Drama from the Alliance for Children and Television
- 1997 2 - Chicago International Children's Film Festival – Best Live Action Children's Film and Best Director – David Devine
- 1998 Chicago International Film Festival Scifest – Youth Jury Winner for Most Inspiring Film
- 1998 Chicago International Film Festival Scifest – (APASE Award) (Association for the Advancement of Science in Education)

Leonardo: A Dream of Flight

- 1998 Gemini Award for Best Writing in a Children's or Youth Program or Series
- 1998 Parents' Choice Award Recommendation

Galileo: On the Shoulders of Giants

- Daytime Emmy Award for Outstanding Cinematography
- Daytime Emmy Award for Outstanding Writing For A Children's Series
- 2 other nominations in the 26th Daytime Emmy Awards including Outstanding Children's Special
- U.S. International Film and Video Festival - Gold Camera Award for Best Children's Program
- U.S. Film and Video Festival – Best Director - David Devine

Edison: The Wizard of Light

- 2005 Gemini Award for Best Children's or Youth Program or Series (+1 nomination)
- Daytime Emmy Award for Outstanding Sound Mixing (+4 nominations; including Outstanding Children's Special)
- 2005 Winner of the First Place Gold Camera Award at the U.S. International Film and Video Festival for Best Children's Production

Degas and the Dancer

- 2007 Parents' Choice Award for Best Children's Program
- Booklist Magazines' Best Video of the Year
- 2007 – Winner of the Notable Children's Video Award
- Winner of the 2007 Humanitas Prize for Live Action Family Television
- 2007 – Winner of the Yorkton Film and Video Festival's Best Children's Program

Mary Cassatt: American Impressionist

- Daytime Emmy Award for Outstanding Single Camera Editing
- Nomination for Outstanding Directing in a Children's Special in the 27th Daytime Emmy Awards

Rembrandt: Fathers and Sons

- 2008 Kids First! All Star Rating from the U.S. Coalition for Quality Children's Media
- 2008 Oppenheim Toy Portfolio Gold Camera Award for Video/DVD

Monet: Shadow and Light

- 2009 Kids First! Finalist for Best Children's Video of the Year

Bailey's Billion$

- 2009 Directors Guild of Canada Nomination

Across the River to Motor City

- 7 nominations in the 23rd Gemini Awards
