= Peter Feranec =

Slovak conductor

Peter Feranec (born 1964, Bratislava) is a Slovak conductor. In 1995, he became the first foreign-born, as well as the youngest, person to be appointed Chief Conductor at the Bolshoi Theatre. From 2007 to 2009, he was the Principal Conductor of the Slovak Philharmonic. In June 2009 he has been appointed Music Director and Chief Conductor of the Mikhailovsky Theatre. In 2011 he became musical director of the Janáček Opera in Brno.
