= Frida Kern =

Austrian composer

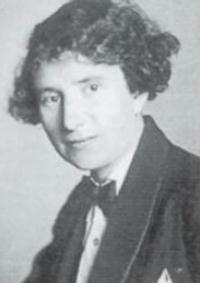
- Frida Kern
- Born: 9 March 1891; Vienna, Austria
- Died: 23 December 1988 (aged 97); Linz, Austria
- Known for: Austrian composer

Frida Kern (née Seitz) (9 March 1891 — 23 December 1988) was an Austrian composer. She was born in Vienna and grew up in Linz, studying piano with Anna Zappa, and later at the Linz Music Academy with August Göllerich.

== Biography ==
Kern was born on 9 March 1891 in Vienna, Austria. In 1896, her family relocated to Linz where she grew up at. She married Max Kern in 1909 and began composing in 1911. In 1923 she entered the Vienna Academy where she studied composition with Franz Schmidt and conducting with Robert Heger. She continued her studies with Eusebius Mandyczewski and Alexander Wunderer, graduating in 1927. Kern established a women's orchestra which toured Europe and North Africa, and in 1942 took a teaching position at the music school in Vienna. In 1960 she was honored by the Austrian Republic. She died in Linz on 23 December 1988.

== Works ==
Selected works include:

- Die vier Geigerlein (Vier kleine Vortragsstucke) (1891–1988) For 4 violins
- Flotenserenade op. 62 (1891–1988) For flute and piano
- Scherzo (1891–1988) For Horn and Piano
- Spanischer Tanz Nr. 1 aus op. 24 (1891–1988) For Bassoon and Piano or Violoncello and Piano
- Vier Stucke fur Blaserquintett op. 25 (1891–1988) for Wind Quintet

Her music has been recorded and issued on CD, including:

- Frida Kern
