= Alexander Wunderer =

Austrian musician

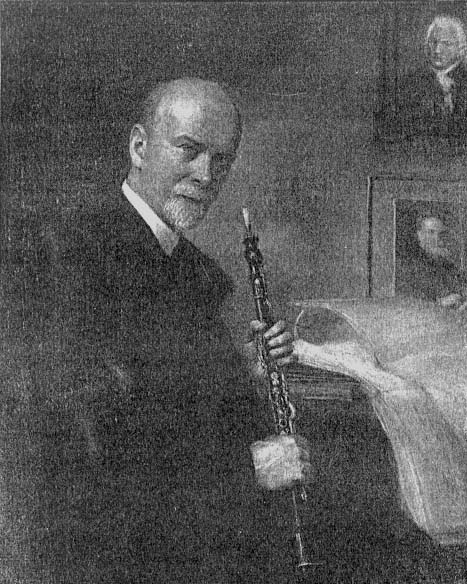
Alexander Wunderer

Alexander Wunderer (11 April 1877 – 29 December 1955) was an Austrian oboist, orchestra leader and composer.

== Life ==
Wunderer was born on 11 April 1877 in Vienna, Austria-Hungary. He served as a professor at the State Music Academy in Vienna, where he taught students including Frida Kern, Ľudovít Rajter and Herbert von Karajan. He played as principal oboist with the Vienna Philharmonic and later served as executive director and manager of the orchestra.

Wunderer died on 29 December 1955 in Zinkenbach in what is today the municipality of St. Gilgen.

== Selected works ==
- 24 Etüden in allen Tonarten (24 etudes in all keys) for oboe (1924)
- Sonata for viola and piano, Op. 21 (1946)
- Duet for 2 violas (1948)
- Zinkenbacher-Variationen, Theme and 10 Variations for piano, Op. 24 (published 1952)
- Aufbruch zur Jagd und Hallali
- Ländler for 4 horns
- Ländler Trio No. 1 for oboe, bassoon and piano
- Waldruhe
