= Ādaži Airfield =

Airport in Latvia

Ādaži Airfield Ādažu lidlauks
- IATA: none; ICAO: EVAD

Summary
- Airport type: Public
- Operator: Ādaži Airpark
- Location: Eimuri, Ādaži Parish, Latvia
- Elevation AMSL: 36 ft / 11 m
- Coordinates: 57°05′54.6″N 24°15′58.32″E

Map
- Location of airport in Latvia

Runways
Direction	Length		Surface
Direction	m	ft	Surface
15/33	396	1,300	Asphalt

Ādaži Airfield (Latvian: Ādažu lidlauks) (ICAO: EVAD) is an airfield in Latvia. It is situated near Eimuri, Ādaži Parish, 30 km (19 mi) north of Riga.

The first private certified airfield in Latvia, which may receive up to 60 small private planes. The range of services includes training of ultra-light plane pilots, maintenance and repair works for planes, trade and rent of planes, as well as advertising flights.

== History ==
Ādaži Airfield was built in 1973 for the agricultural needs of Ādaži Kolkhoz. An asphalt runway was built, measuring 450 meters long and 20 meters wide. It was also equipped with an apron, hangar, fuel and technical/maintenance stations and a storage for mineral fertilization. At the time, the Ādaži Kolkhoz took a major role on agriculture in the Soviet Union.

After Latvia gained independence in 1991, agricultural aviation declined, leading to the abandonment of Ādaži Airfield. The Ministry of Transport also saw that it was unnecessary to maintain the airfield due to financial costs. It was returned to its original owners, and subsequently went through multiple stages of ownership, all of which were uninterested in the development of the aerodrome. By 1994, about 100 small agricultural airfields, including Ādaži, were disused and left to degrade. However, in 2003, aviation enthusiasts acquired the aerodrome, and began repairing the runway. Nearby fields were also leveled, and a hangar and office was installed.
