= Bailey's Billion$ =

- Theatrical release poster
- Directed by: David Devine
- Written by: Heather Conkie; Mary Walsh
- Starring: Dean Cain; Laurie Holden; Jennifer Tilly; Tim Curry; Jon Lovitz
- Cinematography: Gavin Finney
- Music by: Lou Pomanti
- Production companies: MoVision Entertainment; Arclight Films; Spice Factory; The Nightingale Company; Devine Entertainment; Movie Central; Comanca Films
- Distributed by: Echo Bridge Entertainment; Odeon Films (Canada)
- Release date: August 2005
- Running time: 90 minutes
- Country: Canada
- Language: English

Bailey's Billion$ is a 2005 Canadian family comedy film produced and directed by David Devine and starring Dean Cain, Laurie Holden, Jennifer Tilly, Tim Curry, and Jon Lovitz.

== Plot ==
A talking Golden Retriever named Bailey inherits a fortune from his deceased owner, Constance Pennington. He becomes the target of a dog-napping plot by Constance's nephew Caspar and his wife Dolores. The scheme is ultimately foiled.

== Cast ==
- Dean Cain as Theodore Maxwell
- Laurie Holden as Marge Maggs
- Jennifer Tilly as Dolores Pennington
- Tim Curry as Caspar Pennington
- Jon Lovitz as Bailey (voice)
- Melissa DiMarco as Tessa (voice)
- Max Baker as Don Donald
- Sheila McCarthy as Peggy Delaney
- Kenneth Welsh as Mouse Delaney
- Angela Vallee as Samantha Maggs
- Munro Chambers as Max Rizzo
- Eugene Lipinski as Leo
- Jackie Burroughs as Constance Pennington
- Richard Waugh as Harry Innis
