= What's New (Canadian TV program) =

- Genre: News
- Presented by: Harry Mannis (1972–1979); Sandy Lane (1972–1979); David Schatzky (1979–1980); Wayne Thompson (1980–1982); Marie-Claude Lavalleé (1980–1981); Lon Appleby (1980–1981); Sara Welch (1981–1982); Suhana Meharchand (1987–1989)
- Country of origin: Canada
- Original language: English
- No. of seasons: 17+

Production
- Executive producers: Ray Hazzan (1972–1977); Sybel Sandorfy (1978–1982); Wayne Thompson (1981–1982)
- Running time: 30 minutes

Original release
- Network: CBC Television
- Release: 14 September 1972 – 1989

What's New is a Canadian news and current affairs television program for youth that aired on CBC Television from 1972 until at least 1989.

== Premise ==
This program provided a summary of news items and features for a secondary school youth audience. Puppetry by Noreen Young was included on some segments for satiric sketches.

== Scheduling ==
This half-hour program was broadcast for ten seasons as follows:

Day	Time	Season run	Notes
Thursdays	5:00 p.m.	14 September 1972 to 31 March 1973	
Thursdays	5:00 p.m.	13 September 1973 to 30 May 1974	
Fridays	10:00 a.m.	2 November to 7 December 1973	
Thursdays	5:00 p.m.	26 September 1974 to 29 May 1975	
Fridays	10:00 a.m.	1 November 1974 to 30 April 1975	rebroadcast
Thursdays	5:00 p.m.	11 September 1975 to April 1976	
Thursdays	4:30 p.m.	8 April to 27 May 1976	
Fridays	10:00 a.m.	8 April to 27 May 1976	rebroadcast
Thursdays	5:00 p.m.	7 October 1976 to April 1977	
Fridays	10:00 a.m.	7 October 1976 to April 1977	
Thursdays	4:30 p.m.	7 April to 26 May 1977	
Fridays	10:00 a.m.	8 April to 27 May 1977	rebroadcast
Thursdays	4:30 p.m.	6 October 1977 to 25 May 1978	
Fridays	10:00 a.m.	7 October 1977 to 26 May 1978	
Thursdays	4:30 p.m.	14 September 1978 to 24 May 1979	
Fridays	10:00 a.m.	14 September 1978 to 24 May 1979	rebroadcast
Fridays	10:00 a.m.	12 October 1979 to 30 May 1980	
Saturdays	11:30 a.m.	13 October 1979 to 31 May 1980	rebroadcast
Thursdays	4:00 p.m.	16 October 1980 to 7 May 1981	
Fridays	10:00 a.m.	17 October 1980 to 8 May 1981	rebroadcast
Saturdays	12:00 p.m.	16 October 1980 to 7 May 1981	rebroadcast
Thursdays	4:00 p.m.	15 October 1981 to 27 May 1982	
