= Monument to the Victims of All Wars =

Monument in Ljubljana, Slovenia

Coordinates: 46°3′2.70″N 14°30′14.03″E

The Monument to the Victims of All Wars (Slovene: Spomenik žrtvam vseh vojn, also Spomenik vsem žrtvam vojn (in z vojnami povezanim žrtvam na območju RS), 'Monument to the Victims of All Wars and Victims Connected with Wars in Slovenia') is a monument in Ljubljana, Slovenia.

== History ==
The monument was commissioned in 2013 by Slovenia's Ministry of Labor, Family, Social Affairs, and Equal Opportunities to commemorate those fallen in wars and those that were affected by wars in any way. The monument is planned for installation along Šubic Street (Šubičeva cesta) and north of Star Park (Park Zvezda) at South Square (Južni trg), which had been a projected but unimplemented urban planning project. The monument is intended to be a key step in reconciliation of the Slovenian nation over divisions from the Second World War, and the space is conceived as the first step in regulating the entire area between Congress Square (Kongresni trg) and the Knafelj Passage (Knafljev prehod).

=== Construction ===
Site preparation started in June 2015, when the wall was razed between the Casino Building (Kazina) and the building at Congress Square no. 3. The display area was opened on June 23, 2015, with a temporary model of the monument enclosed in a glass display case. The permanent monument was scheduled for installation in 2016.

=== Vandalism ===
On June 18, 2015, the temporary model of the monument was vandalized with graffiti. The model was vandalized again with communist slogans and red stars on July 27, 2015, and once more on September 26, 2015, with communist slogans, red stars, and parts of a pig carcass. The monument was vandalized yet again with a political slogan on April 17, 2018.
