= Bystrík Režucha =

Slovak conductor (1935–2012)

Bystrík Režucha (14 January 1935 in Bratislava – 16 August, 2012) was a Slovak conductor. He was a chief conductor of the Slovak Philharmonic Orchestra.

Bystrík Režucha studied conducting at the Academy of Music in Bratislava with Ľudovít Rajter then later in Leipzig. He appeared first as second regular conductor of the Czechoslovak Radio in Bratislava, and he contributed to the creation of Slovakia's second largest orchestra, the Košice State Philharmonic. Režucha became its first chief conductor from the foundation in 1968 until 1981. Between 1984 and 1989 he was music director of the Slovak Philharmonic Orchestra.

Bystrík Režucha became a renowned teacher, being professor at his alma mater (Academy of Music, Bratislava) and guest lecturer at the Universities of Michigan and Massachusetts in the USA. For the 50th jubilee anniversary of the Slovak Philharmonic in 1999, he received the title of conductor emeritus. He appeared on many concert stages all over the world, not only in Europe but also in the USA, Mexico, Cuba, Venezuela, Japan, Korean Republic and Singapore. During his tenures at the Slovak Radio and later at the Slovak Philharmonic, Bystrík Režucha made a significant amount of recordings of the standard repertoire in LP and CD.
