= Michael Pacek =

Canadian film editor

- Occupation: Film editor

Michael Pacek is a Canadian film editor. Pacek has been nominated for three Genie Awards for film editing. He won two Genie Awards for his work on Bruce McDonald's Dance Me Outside (1994).

Pacek is a member of the Canadian Cinema Editors honours society.

== Recognition ==
- 1996 Winner, Genie Award for "Best Achievement in Editing" - Dance Me Outside (1994)
- 1996 Winner, Genie Award for "Best Achievement in Sound Editing" - Dance Me Outside (1994) (Shared with Steve Munro, Andy Malcom, Peter Winniger, Michael Werth)
- 1992 Genie Award for "Best Achievement in Film Editing" - Highway 61 (1991) - Nominated
