= Postal codes in Latvia =

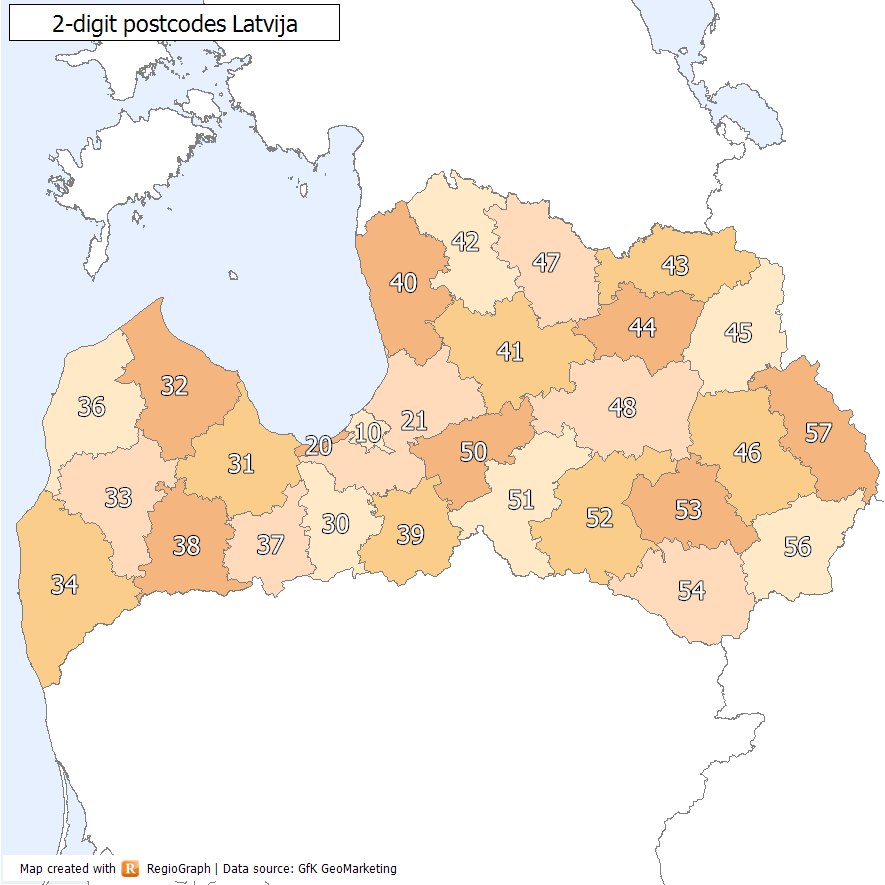
2-digit postcode areas Latvia (defined through the first two postcode digits).

Postal codes in Latvia are 4 digit numeric and use a mandatory ISO 3166-1 alpha-2 country code (LV) in front, i.e. the format is “LV-NNNN”. The first two digits of the postcode are determined by which administrative district the address is located within, for example the capital city of Riga is 10. Then the district is further divided, for example the 3rd and 4th numerals for Skonto Stadium in Riga are also 10, so it is in the postal address of LV-1010.

== See also ==
- ISO 3166-2:LV
- Subdivisions of Latvia
