= Ondrej Lenárd =

Slovak conductor (born 1942)

Ondrej Lenárd (9 September 1942, Korompa, Hungary [now Krompachy, Slovakia]) is a Slovak conductor. He was principal conductor of the Czecho-Slovak Radio Symphony Orchestra from 1977 to 1990 and of the Slovak Philharmonic Orchestra from 1991 to 2001, where his concert work included performances of Ján Levoslav Bella's Wieland der Schmied. His recordings include a Marco Polo issue of the Symphony No. 1 of Havergal Brian, and a Naxos recording of the complete Nutcracker. In 2013 he was the conductor of the 70th anniversary concert held at the Hungarian State Opera of the famed Hungarian soprano Éva Marton, which featured Grace Bumbry and Jonas Kaufmann. In 2019, he became chief conductor for the Slovak Radio Symphony Orchestra.

== Discography ==
- Eugen Suchoň: Krútňava
- Antonín Dvořák: Symphony No. 9 "New World" (1988, Gold Fidelity, Pacific Music Co., Ltd.)
- Pavol Habera: Svet lásku má (1996, Polygram)
- Pyotr Ilyich Tchaikovsky: Swan Lake (1989 Naxos)
