= Gemini Awards =

Canadian television award

Gemini Award
- Awarded for: Best television productions in Canada
- Country: Canada
- Presented by: Academy of Canadian Cinema and Television
- First award: 1986
- Final award: 2011
- Website: http://www.geminiawards.ca/
- Related: Canadian Screen Awards; Prix Gémeaux

The Gemini Awards were awards given by the Academy of Canadian Cinema & Television between 1986–2011 to recognize the achievements of Canada's English-language television industry. The Gemini Awards are analogous to the Emmy Awards given in the United States and the BAFTA Television Awards in the United Kingdom. First held in 1986 to replace the ACTRA Award, the ceremony celebrated Canadian television productions with awards in 87 categories, along with other special awards such as lifetime achievement awards. The Academy had previously presented the one-off Bijou Awards in 1981, inclusive of some television productions.

The awards' name was an allusion to Castor and Pollux, a mythological pair of twins; this was in reference to Canada's linguistic duality of English and French, with the Academy's separate awards presentation for French-language television production named the Gémeaux Awards. The statuette, designed by Toronto artist Scott Thornley, evoked twins through a design that essentially created two faces at the front and back of the statuette.

In April 2012, the Academy of Canadian Cinema & Television announced that the Gemini Awards and the Genie Awards would be discontinued and replaced by a new award ceremony dedicated to all forms of Canadian media, including television, film, and digital media, dubbed the "Canadian Screen Awards." The inaugural Canadian Screen Awards were held on 4 March 2013.

== Award categories ==
- Best News Information Series
- Best News Magazine Segment
- Best News Special Event Coverage
- Best Reportage
- Best Newscast
- Gemini Humanitarian Award
- Best Sports Play-by-Play or Analyst
- Best Live Sporting Documentary's Best Direction in a Live Sporting Event
- Best Sports Program or Series
- Outstanding Technical Achievement Award
- Best Writing in an Information or Series
- Best Sound in an Information/Documentary Program or Series
- Best Photography in Information Program or Series
- Best Picture Editing in an Information Program or Series
- Best Direction in a News Information Program or Series
- Best Host or Interviewer in a News Information Program or Series
- Academy Achievement Award
- Best Science, Technology, Nature, Environment or Adventure Documentary Program
- Best Biography Documentary Program
- Best Original Music Score for a Documentary Program or Series
- Best History Documentary Program
- Best Performing Arts Program or Series or Arts Documentary Program or Series
- Gordon Sinclair Award for Broadcast Journalism
- Best Direction in a Documentary's Program
- Best Direction in a Documentary Series
- Best Picture Editing in a Documentary Program or Series
- Best Photography in a Documentary Program or Series
- Best Writing in a Documentary Program or Series
- Best Documentary Series
- Best Writing in a Children's or Youth Program or Series
- Best Direction in a Children's or Youth Program or Series
- Best Performance in a Children's or Youth Program or Series
- Best Children's or Youth Fiction Program or Series
- Best Children's or Youth Non-Fiction Program or Series
- Best Original Music Score for an Animated Program or Series
- Best Animated Program or Series
- Best Pre-School Program or Series
- Most Popular Website
- Canada Award
- Best Production Design or Art Direction in a Non-Dramatic Program or Series
- Best Lifestyle/Practical Information Segment
- Best Direction in a Lifestyle/Practical Information Program or Series
- Best Cross Platform Project
- Best General/Human Interest Series
- Best Host in a Lifestyle/Practical Information, or Performing Arts Program or Series
- Best Lifestyle/Practical Information Series
- Best Host or Interviewer in a General/Human Interest or Talk Program or Series
- Best Talk Series
- Best Reality Program or Series
- Best Performance by an Actor in a Featured Supporting Role in a Dramatic Series
- Best Writing in a Dramatic Series
- Best Direction in a Dramatic Series
- Best Picture Editing in a Dramatic Program or Series
- Best Sound in a Dramatic Series
- Best Production Design or Art Direction in a Dramatic Program or Series
- Best Performance by an Actress in a Featured Supporting Role in a Dramatic Series
- Best Sound in a Comedy, Variety, or Performing Arts Program or Series
- Best Picture Editing in a Comedy, Variety or Performing Arts Program or Series
- Best Photography in a Comedy, Variety or Performing Arts Program or Series
- Best Direction in a Variety Program or Series
- Best Direction in a Performing Arts Program or Series
- Best Direction in a Comedy Program or Series
- Best Performance or Host in a Variety Program or Series
- Best Performance in a Performing Arts Program or Series
- Best Individual Performance in a Comedy Program or Series
- Best Music, Variety Program or Series
- Best TV Movie
- Best Achievement in Make-Up
- Best Costume Design
- Best Achievement in Casting
- Best Visual Effects
- Best Original Music Score for a Program or Mini-Series
- Best Original Music Score for a Dramatic Series
- Earle Grey Award
- Best Performance by an Actor in a Featured Supporting Role in a Dramatic Program or Mini-Series
- Best Performance by an Actress in a Featured Supporting Role in a Dramatic Program or Mini-Series
- Best Sound in a Dramatic Program
- Best Photography in a Dramatic Program or Series
- Best Performance by an Actor in a Guest Role Dramatic Series
- Best Performance by an Actress in a Guest Role Dramatic Series
- Best Performance by an Actor in a Leading Role in a Dramatic Program or Mini-Series
- Best Performance by an Actress in a Leading Role in a Dramatic Program or Mini-Series
- Best Host or Interviewer in a Sports Program or Sportscast
- Best Writing in a Dramatic Program or Mini-Series
- Best Direction in a Dramatic Program or Mini-Series
- Best Writing in a Comedy or Variety Program or Series
- Best Comedy Program or Series
- Best Performance by an Actress in a Continuing Leading Dramatic Role
- Best Performance by an Actor in a Continuing Leading Dramatic Role
- Best News Anchor
- Best Dramatic Mini-Series
- Best Dramatic Series
- Best Ensemble Performance in a Comedy Program or Series
- Viewers' Choice Award (Viewer's Choice Award for Lifestyle Host Gemini)
- Best Music Video

=== Special awards ===
- Academy Achievement Award - general lifetime honour, inaugurated in 1996
- Donald Brittain Award - for the best political or social documentary
- Canada Award - began in 1988 as the Multiculturalism Award, this is award "honours excellence in mainstream television programming that reflects the racial and cultural diversity of Canada."
- Margaret Collier Award - lifetime writing honour
- John Drainie Award - broadcasting, not necessarily awarded every year
- Humanitarian Award - inaugurated in 2001, recipients to date:
  - (2001) Donald Martin
  - (2002) Wendy Crewson
  - (2003) Max Keeping
  - (2004) George R. Robertson
  - (2005) Royal Canadian Air Farce
- Gordon Sinclair Award for Broadcast Journalism - for television journalists who make outstanding contributions

== Dates and locations ==
#	Year	Date	Best Dramatic Series	Best Comedy Series	City	Venue	Host(s)	Broadcaster
1st	1986	4 December	Night Heat	Seeing Things	Toronto, Ontario	Metro Toronto Convention Centre	Eugene Levy, Andrea Martin, Dave Thomas	syndicated
2nd	1987	8 December	Night Heat	Seeing Things	Toronto, Ontario	Metro Toronto Convention Centre	Steve Smith	CBC
3rd	1988		Degrassi Junior High	None	Toronto, Ontario	Metro Toronto Convention Centre	Steve Smith	CBC
4th	1989		Degrassi Junior High	CODCO	Toronto, Ontario	Metro Toronto Convention Centre	Martin Short	CBC
5th	1990		E.N.G.	Material World	Toronto, Ontario	Metro Toronto Convention Centre	Ralph Benmergui	CBC
6th	1992		E.N.G.	CODCO	Toronto, Ontario	Metro Toronto Convention Centre	Cynthia Dale and Ralph Benmergui	CBC
7th	1993		E.N.G.	The Kids in the Hall	Toronto, Ontario	Metro Toronto Convention Centre	Sara Botsford and Greg Malone	CBC
8th	1994	6 March	E.N.G.	The Kids in the Hall	Toronto, Ontario	Metro Toronto Convention Centre	Valerie Pringle and Albert Schultz	CBC
9th	1995	5 March	Due South	This Hour Has 22 Minutes	Toronto, Ontario	Metro Toronto Convention Centre	Paul Gross and Tina Keeper	CBC
10th	1996	3 March	Due South	This Hour Has 22 Minutes	Toronto, Ontario	Metro Toronto Convention Centre	Albert Schultz	CBC
11th	1997	6 June	Due South	This Hour Has 22 Minutes	Toronto, Ontario	Metro Toronto Convention Centre	Albert Schultz	CBC
12th	1998 (1)	1 March	Traders	This Hour Has 22 Minutes	Toronto, Ontario	Metro Toronto Convention Centre	Cathy Jones and Steve Smith	CBC
13th	1998 (2)	4 October	Traders	This Hour Has 22 Minutes	Toronto, Ontario	Metro Toronto Convention Centre	Ronnie Edwards and Kenny Robinson	CBC
14th	1999	7 November	Da Vinci's Inquest	Made in Canada	Toronto, Ontario	Metro Toronto Convention Centre	Rick Mercer	CBC
15th	2000	30 October	Da Vinci's Inquest	This Hour Has 22 Minutes	Toronto, Ontario	John Bassett Theatre	Steve Smith	CBC
16th	2001	29 October	Da Vinci's Inquest	Made in Canada	Toronto, Ontario	Metro Toronto Convention Centre	Mike Bullard	CBC
17th	2002	4 November	Da Vinci's Inquest	An American in Canada	Toronto, Ontario	Metro Toronto Convention Centre	Seán Cullen	CBC
18th	2003	20 October	The Eleventh Hour	This Hour Has 22 Minutes	Toronto, Ontario	John Bassett Theatre	Seán Cullen	CBC
19th	2004	13 December	Da Vinci's Inquest	Trailer Park Boys	Toronto, Ontario	John Bassett Theatre	various presenters	CBC
20th	2005	19 November	The Eleventh Hour	Corner Gas	Toronto, Ontario	John Bassett Theatre	various presenters	Global
21st	2006	4 November	Slings & Arrows	Corner Gas	Richmond, British Columbia	River Rock Casino Resort	various presenters	Global
22nd	2007	28 October	Slings & Arrows	Corner Gas	Regina, Saskatchewan	Conexus Arts Centre	George Stroumboulopoulos	CBC
23rd	2008	28 November	Intelligence	This Hour Has 22 Minutes	Toronto, Ontario	The John Bassett Theatre	Jason Priestley	Showcase, E!
24th	2009	14 November	Flashpoint	Rick Mercer Report	Calgary, Alberta	Stampede Corral	Ron James	Showcase, Global
25th	2010	13 November	The Tudors	Less Than Kind	Toronto, Ontario	Winter Garden Theatre	Cory Monteith	Showcase, Global
26th	2011	7 September	The Borgias	Rick Mercer Report	Toronto, Ontario	Canadian Broadcasting Centre	Russell Peters	CBC

== See also ==
- Canadian television awards
