= Slovak Philharmonic =

Symphony orchestra based in Bratislava, Slovakia

Coordinates: 48°08′28″N 17°06′37″E

- Orchestra
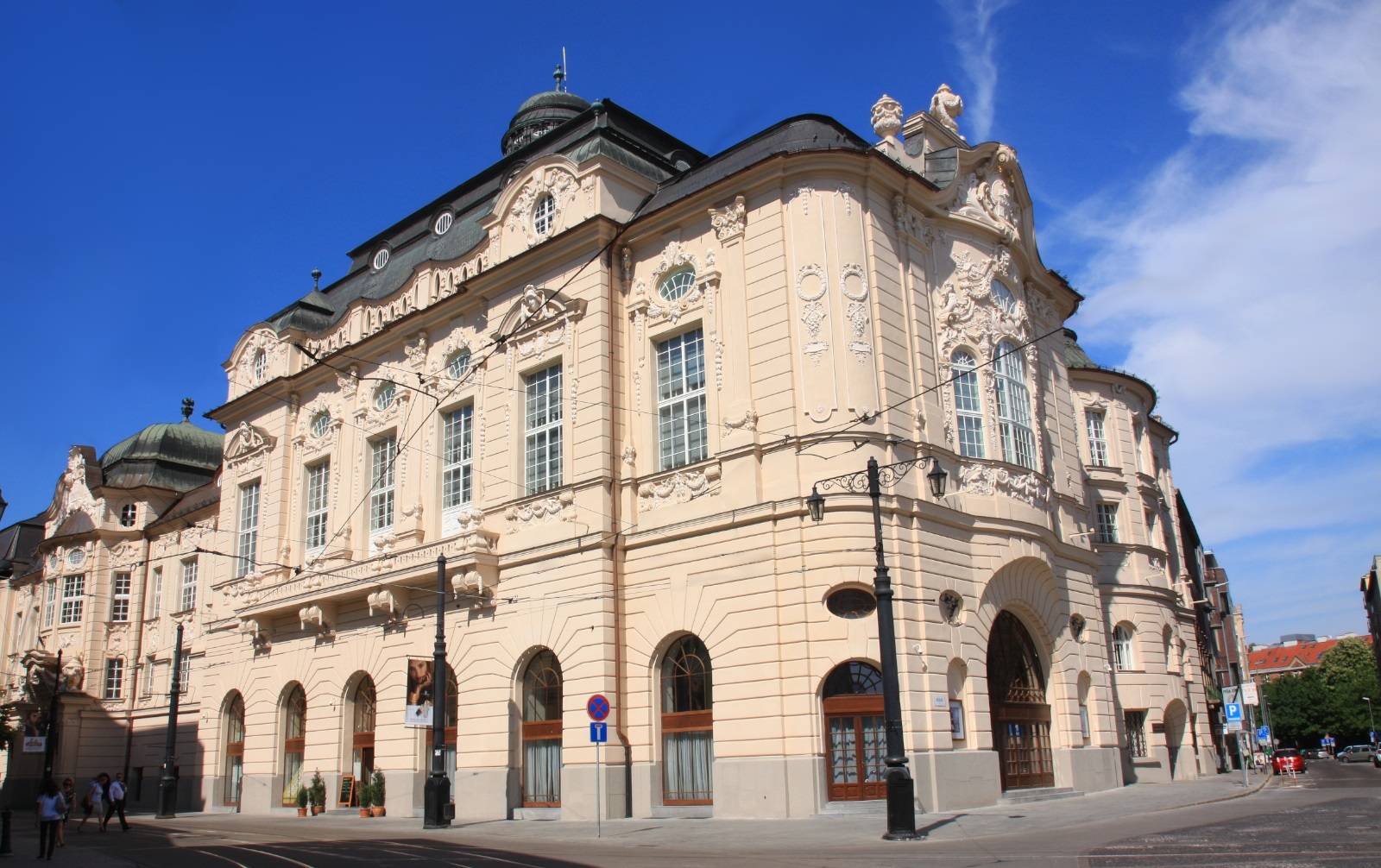
- Reduta
- Founded: 1949
- Location: Bratislava, Slovakia
- Concert hall: Reduta Bratislava Concert Hall
- Principal conductor: Daniel Raiskin
- Website: filharmonia.sk

The Slovak Philharmonic or Slovak State Philharmonic (Slovenská filharmónia) is a Slovak symphony orchestra based in Bratislava. Founded in 1949, the orchestra has resided since the 1950s in the Baroque-era Reduta Bratislava concert hall constructed in 1773.

The current chief conductor of the orchestra is Daniel Raiskin, since the start of the 2020–2021 season.

== Principal conductors ==
- Václav Talich (1949–1952)
- Ľudovít Rajter (1949–1952)
- Tibor Frešo (1952–1953)
- Ľudovít Rajter (1953–1976)
- Ladislav Slovák (1961–1981)
- Libor Pešek (1981–1982)
- Vladimir Verbitsky (1982–1984)
- Bystrík Režucha (1984–1989)
- Aldo Ceccato (1990–1991)
- Ondrej Lenárd (1991–2001)
- Jiří Bělohlávek (2003–2004)
- Vladimír Válek (2004–2007)
- Peter Feranec (2007–2009)
- Emmanuel Villaume (2009–2016)
- James Judd (2017–2020)
- Daniel Raiskin (2020–present)
