= 1940 in music =

This is a list of notable events in music that took place in the year 1940.

== Specific locations ==
- 1940 in British music
- 1940 in Norwegian music

== Specific genres ==
- 1940 in country music
- 1940 in jazz

== Events ==
- January 30 – Soprano Sophie Wyss gives the first complete performance of Benjamin Britten's Les Illuminations, with Boyd Neel conducting his Orchestra at the Wigmore Hall, London.
- February 24 – Frances Langford records When You Wish Upon a Star
- March 28 – Antonio Brosa gives the first performance of Britten's Violin Concerto with the New York Philharmonic conducted by John Barbirolli in Carnegie Hall, New York.
- April 26 – Woody Guthrie records most of his Dust Bowl Ballads at RCA Victor studios in Camden, New Jersey.
- May 27 – Quartetto Egie perform in public for the first time.
- July 20 – Billboard magazine publishes its first "Music Popularity Chart".
- August – Edmundo Ros forms his own rumba band.
- November 9 – Joaquín Rodrigo's Concierto de Aranjuez is premièred in Barcelona.
- November 13 – Première of the Walt Disney animated film Fantasia in the United States set to classical music conducted by Leopold Stokowski.
- November 23 – Dmitri Shostakovich's Piano Quintet is premièred at the Moscow Conservatory with the composer at the piano.
- December 6 – Arnold Schoenberg's Violin Concerto is premièred.
- December 19 – Bandleader Hal Kemp's car is involved in a head-on collision. Kemp suffers a broken leg and multiple broken ribs, one of which eventually punctures a lung, causing his death a few days later.
- Quartetto Egie becomes Quartetto Ritmo after a line-up change.
- Heino Eller becomes professor of composition at the Tallinn Conservatory.
- Alfredo Antonini and John Serry Sr. appear at the CBS network in Viva America for Voice of America.
- 16-year-old Doris Day joins Les Brown's band.
- Gesang Martohartono, the legendary Kroncong musician from Indonesia, releases his most popular composition, "Bengawan Solo".

== Albums released ==
- Dust Bowl Ballads – Woody Guthrie
- Selections from George Gershwin's Folk Opera Porgy and Bess – Various Artists
- Bing Crosby
  - Star Dust
  - Favorite Hawaiian Songs
  - Ballad for Americans
- Christmas Music – Bing Crosby, Kenny Baker, Men About Town

== Top popular recordings ==
The following songs appeared in The Billboard's 'Best Selling Retail Records' chart during 1940. Each week fifteen points were awarded to the number one record, then nine points for number two, eight points for number three, and so on. The total points a record earned determined its year-end rank. Regional charts determined the 11–25 rankings each week, and records that failed to score on the main chart were ranked by highest position. Additional information was obtained from the "Discography of American Historical Recordings" website, Joel Whitburn's Pop Memories 1890–1954 and other sources as specified.

Rank	Artist	Title	Label	Recorded	Released	Chart positions
1	Artie Shaw and His Orchestra	"Frenesi"	Victor 26542	March 3, 1940	March 29, 1940	US BB 1940 #1, US #1 for 13 weeks, 29 total weeks, Grammy Hall of Fame 2000, 1,000,000 sold
2	Tommy Dorsey and His Orchestra (Vocal Frank Sinatra	"I'll Never Smile Again"	Victor 26628	April 23, 1940	June 7, 1940	US BB 1940 #2, US #1 for 12 weeks, 20 total weeks, 1,000,000 sold
3	Bing Crosby	"Only Forever"	Decca 3300	July 3, 1940	August 1940	US BB 1940 #3, US #1 for 9 weeks, 22 total weeks
4	Glenn Miller and his Orchestra	"Tuxedo Junction"	Bluebird 10612	February 5, 1940	February 23, 1940	US BB 1940 #4, US #1 for 9 weeks, 19 total weeks, 1,000,000 sold
5	Glenn Miller and his Orchestra	"The Woodpecker Song"	Bluebird 10598	January 29, 1940	February 9, 1940	US BB 1940 #5, US #1 for 7 weeks, 16 total weeks
6	Glenn Miller and his Orchestra	"When You Wish Upon a Star"	Bluebird 10570	January 6, 1940	January 19, 1940	US BB 1940 #6, US #1 for 5 weeks, 16 total weeks
7	Glenn Miller and his Orchestra	"Careless"	Bluebird 10520	November 18, 1939	December 8, 1939	US BB 1940 #7, US #1 for 5 weeks, 13 total weeks
8	Tommy Dorsey and His Orchestra (Vocal Jack Leonard)	"All the Things You Are"	Victor 26401	October 20, 1939	November 3, 1939	US BB 1940 #8, US #1 for 2 weeks, 13 total weeks
9	Tommy Dorsey and His Orchestra (Vocal Jack Leonard)	"Indian Summer"	Victor 26390	September 27, 1939	October 20, 1939	US BB 1940 #9, US #1 for 1 week, 16 total weeks
10	Glenn Miller and His Orchestra (Vocal Ray Eberle)	"Fools Rush In (Where Angels Fear to Tread)"	Bluebird 10728	March 31, 1940	May 24, 1940	US BB 1940 #10, US #1 for 3 weeks, 15 total weeks
11	Benny Goodman and His Orchestra (Vocal Mildred Bailey)	"Darn That Dream"	Columbia 35331	December 3, 1939	January 4, 1940	US BB 1940 #11, US #1 for 1 week, 11 total weeks
12	The Ink Spots	"Maybe"	Decca 3258	June 11, 1940	July 1940	US BB 1940 #12, US #2 for 6 weeks, 17 total weeks
13	Glenn Miller and His Orchestra (Vocal Ray Eberle)	"Blueberry Hill"	Bluebird 10768	June 13, 1940	July 1940	US BB 1940 #13, US #2 for 4 weeks, 19 total weeks
14	Will Bradley and His Orchestra	Beat Me Daddy, Eight to the Bar	Columbia 35530	May 21, 1940	June 28, 1940	US BB 1940 #14, US #2 for 1 week, 21 total weeks
15	Bing Crosby	"Trade Winds"	Decca 3299	March 19, 1940	April 1940	US BB 1940 #15, US #2 for 2 weeks, 18 total weeks
16	Jimmy Dorsey and His Orchestra	The Breeze and I	Decca 3150	April 18, 1940	May 1940	US BB 1940 #16, US #2 for 6 weeks, 11 total weeks, 1,000,000 sold
17	The Ink Spots	"We Three (My Echo, My Shadow and Me)"	Decca 3379	July 16, 1940	September 1940	US BB 1940 #17, US #3 for 1 week, 15 total weeks
18	Bing Crosby	"Sierra Sue"	Decca 3133	March 22, 1940	April 1940	US BB 1940 #18, US #3 for 1 week, 14 total weeks
19	Bob Crosby and His Orchestra	"With the Wind and the Rain in Your Hair"	Decca 3018	February 13, 1940	March 1940	US BB 1940 #19, US #2 for 3 weeks, 14 total weeks
20	Tony Martin	"It's a Blue World"	Decca 2932	December 19, 1939	January 1940	US BB 1940 #20, US #2 for 2 weeks, 13 total weeks
21	Glenn Miller and His Orchestra (Vocal Ray Eberle)	"Say It"	Bluebird 10631	February 24, 1940	March 8, 1940	US BB 1940 #21, US #2 for 2 weeks, 11 total weeks

== Published popular music ==
- "Ain't It A Shame About Mame" words: Johnny Burke, music: James V. Monaco
- "All Over The Place" w. Frank Eyton m. Noel Gay. Introduced by Tommy Trinder in the film Sailors Three
- "All This And Heaven Too" w. Eddie De Lange m. Jimmy Van Heusen, First recorded by Charlie Barnet and His Orchestra
- "Along The Santa Fe Trail" w. Al Dubin & Edwina Coolidge m. Will Grosz
- "April Played The Fiddle" w. Johnny Burke m. James V. Monaco
- "The Bad Humour Man" w. Johnny Mercer m. Jimmy McHugh
- "Beat Me Daddy, Eight to the Bar" w.m. Don Raye, Hughie Prince & Eleanore Sheehy
- "Because Of You" w. Arthur Hammerstein m. Dudley Wilkinson
- "Bengawan Solo" – Gesang Martohartono
- "Bewitched, Bothered and Bewildered" w. Lorenz Hart m. Richard Rodgers
- "Bless 'Em All" w.m. Jimmie Hughes, Frank Lake & Fred Godfrey
- "Blow, Blow, Thou Winter Wind" Arthur Young, William Shakespeare, Evans
- "Blueberry Hill" w.m. Al Lewis, Larry Stock & Vincent Rose
- "Boog It" w.m. Jack Palmer, Cab Calloway & R. "Buck" Ram
- "The Breeze And I" w. Al Stillman m. Ernesto Lecuona
- "Buds Won't Bud" w. E. Y. Harburg m. Harold Arlen
- "Cabin In The Sky" w. John Latouche m. Vernon Duke
- "The Call Of The Canyon" w.m. Billy Hill
- "Can't Get Indiana Off My Mind" w. Robert De Leon m. Hoagy Carmichael
- "Concerto For Cootie" m. Duke Ellington
- "Contrasts" m. Jimmy Dorsey
- "Cotton Tail" m. Duke Ellington
- "Den Of Iniquity" w. Lorenz Hart m. Richard Rodgers
- "Devil May Care" w. Johnny Burke m. Harry Warren
- "Do It the Hard Way" w. Lorenz Hart m. Richard Rodgers. Introduced by June Havoc, Claire Anderson and Jack Durant in the musical Pal Joey
- "Dolores" w. Frank Loesser m. Louis Alter
- "Down the Road a Piece" w.m. Don Raye
- "Falling Leaves" w. Mack David m. Frankie Carle
- "Ferry Boat Serenade" w. (Eng) Harold Adamson (Ital) Mario Panzeri m. Eldo Di Lazzaro
- "Flamingo" w. Edmund Anderson m. Ted Grouya
- "Fools Rush In (Where Angels Fear to Tread)" w. Johnny Mercer m. Rube Bloom
- "Friendship" w.m. Cole Porter
- "Give a Little Whistle" w.m. Ned Washington & Leigh Harline, from the film Pinocchio
- "Harlem Nocturne" w. Dick Rogers m. Earle Hagen
- "Hear My Song, Violetta" w. (Ger) Ermenegildo Carosio & Othmar Klose (Eng) Buddy Bernier & Bob Emmerich m. Rudolf Luckesch & Othmar Klose
- "Hi-Diddle-Dee-Dee" w.m. Ned Washington & Leigh Harline, from the film Pinocchio
- "High On A Windy Hill" w.m. Joan Whitney & Alex Kramer
- "Honey in the Honeycomb" w. John Latouche m. Vernon Duke. Introduced by Katherine Dunham in the musical Cabin in the Sky. Performed in the 1943 film version by Ethel Waters and Lena Horne.
- "How High the Moon" w. Nancy Hamilton m. Morgan Lewis. Introduced by Alfred Drake and Frances Comstock in the revue Two for the Show.
- "I Concentrate on You" w.m. Cole Porter. Introduced by Douglas McPhail (and danced to by Eleanor Powell and Fred Astaire) in the film Broadway Melody of 1940
- "I Could Make You Care" w. Sammy Cahn m. Saul Chaplin. Introduced by Rosemary Lane in the film Ladies Must Live.
- "I Haven't Time To Be A Millionaire" w. Johnny Burke m. James V. Monaco
- "I Hear A Rhapsody" w.m. George Fragos, Jack Baker & Dick Gasparre
- "I Hear Music" w. Frank Loesser m. Burton Lane
- "I'm Gonna Move to the Outskirts of Town" w.m. William Weldon & Andy Razaf
- "I'm Looking For A Guy Who Plays Alto And Baritone And Doubles On A Clarinet And Wears A Size 37 Suit" w.m. Ozzie Nelson
- "I'm Stepping Out With A Memory Tonight" w. Herb Magidson m. Allie Wrubel
- "Imagination" w. Johnny Burke m. Jimmy Van Heusen
- "Is You Is Or Is You Ain't My Baby?" w.m. Billy Austin & Louis Jordan
- "It Never Entered My Mind" w. Lorenz Hart m. Richard Rodgers
- "It Shows You What Love Can Do" w. Sammy Cahn m. Saul Chaplin. Introduced by Rosemary Lane in the film Ladies Must Live.
- "It Was A Lover And His Lass" w. William Shakespeare m. Arthur Young
- "It's a Great Day for the Irish" w.m. Roger Edens
- "It's A Lovely Day Tomorrow" w.m. Irving Berlin
- "It's Always You" w. Johnny Burke m. Jimmy Van Heusen
- "I've Got No Strings" w.m. Ned Washington & Leigh Harline, from the film Pinocchio
- "Java Jive" w. Milton Drake m. Ben Oakland
- "Just A Little Bit South Of North Carolina" w.m. Sunny Skylar, Bette Cannon & Arthur Shaftel
- "The Last Time I Saw Paris" w. Oscar Hammerstein II m. Jerome Kern
- "Let The People Sing" w.m. Noel Gay, Ian Grant & Frank Eyton
- "Let There Be Love" w. Ian Grant m. Lionel Rand
- "Let's Be Buddies" w.m. Cole Porter
- "Louisiana Purchase" w.m. Irving Berlin
- "Make It Another Old-Fashioned, Please" w.m. Cole Porter. Introduced by Ethel Merman in the musical Panama Hattie
- "Make-Believe Island" w. Charles Kenny & Nick Kenny m. Will Grosz & Sam Coslow
- "Mamma" w. B. Cherubini m. C. A. Bixio
- "Mister Meadowlark" w. Johnny Mercer m. Walter Donaldson
- "Never No Lament" m. Duke Ellington
- "A Nightingale Sang in Berkeley Square" w. Eric Maschwitz m. Manning Sherwin. Introduced in the revue New Faces by Judy Campbell.
- "On Behalf Of The Visiting Firemen" w. Johnny Mercer m. Walter Donaldson
- "Only Forever" w. Johnny Burke m. James V. Monaco
- "Our Love Affair" w. Arthur Freed m. Roger Edens
- "Outside Of That, I Love You" Irving Berlin
- "The Pessimistic Character" w. Johnny Burke m. James V. Monaco
- "Playmates" w.m. Saxie Dowell
- "Polka Dots and Moonbeams" w. Johnny Burke m. Jimmy Van Heusen
- "Remind Me" w. Dorothy Fields m. Jerome Kern. Introduced by Allan Jones in the film One Night in the Tropics
- "Room 504" w.m. Erich Maschwitz & George Posford
- "San Antonio Rose" w.m. Bob Wills
- "Say It (Over And Over Again)" w. Frank Loesser m. Jimmy McHugh
- "Scrub Me Mama With A Boogie Beat" w.m. Don Raye
- "Six Lessons From Madame La Zonga" w. Charles Newman m. James V. Monaco
- "Sometime" m. Glenn Miller & Chummy MacGregor w. Mitchell Parish
- "The Stars Remain" w. Henry Myers m. Jay Gorney. From the musical Meet the People.
- "Summit Ridge Drive" m. Artie Shaw
- "Taking A Chance On Love" w. John Latouche & Ted Fetter m. Vernon Duke
- "There'll Always Be an England" w.m. Ross Parker & Hughie Charles
- "Trade Winds" w. Charles Tobias m. Cliff Friend
- "Two Dreams Met" w. Mack Gordon m. Harry Warren
- "Waltzing In The Clouds" w. Gus Kahn m. Robert Stolz
- "We Could Make Such Beautiful Music" w. Robert Sour m. Henry Manners
- "We Three" w.m. Nelson Cogane, Sammy Mysels & Dick Robertson
- "Well, Did You Evah?" w.m. Cole Porter
- "When The Swallows Come Back To Capistrano" w.m. Leon René
- "When You Wish Upon a Star" w.m. Ned Washington & Leigh Harline. Introduced by Cliff Edwards in the animated film Pinocchio
- "Whispering Grass" w. Fred Fisher m. Doris Fisher
- "The Woodpecker Song" w. (Eng) Harold Adamson (Ital) C. Bruno m. Eldo di Lazzaro
- "Worried Mind" w.m. Jimmie Davis & Ted Daffan
- "Yes, Indeed!" w.m. Sy Oliver
- "Yes, My Darling Daughter" w.m. Jack Lawrence
- "You and Your Kiss" w. Dorothy Fields m. Jerome Kern. Introduced by Allan Jones in the film One Night in the Tropics.
- "You Are My Sunshine" w.m. Jimmie Davis & Charles Mitchell
- "You Stepped Out Of A Dream" w. Gus Kahn m. Nacio Herb Brown
- "Zip" w. Lorenz Hart m. Richard Rodgers. In the role of reporter Melba Snyder in the Broadway production of Pal Joey, Jean Casto explained that the musings of a striptease artiste may be on a somewhat higher intellectual plane than those of her devotees.

== Classical music ==
=== Premieres ===
Composer	Composition	Date	Location	Performers
Britten, Benjamin	Les Illuminations	1940-01-30	London	Wyss / Neel String Orchestra – Neel
Britten, Benjamin	Violin Concerto	1940-03-29	New York City	Brosa / New York Philharmonic – Barbirolli
Carpenter, John Alden	Symphony No. 1 (2nd version)	1940-10-24	Chicago	Chicago Symphony – Stock
Chávez, Carlos	Xochipilli-Macuilxóchitl	1940-05-16	Museum of Modern Art, New York City	Ensemble – Chávez
Creston, Paul	Symphony No. 1	1940-02-22	New York City	NYA Symphony – Mahler
Ginastera, Alberto	Malambo for piano	1940-09-11	Montevideo, Uruguay	Balzo
Ginastera, Alberto	Three Pieces for Piano	1940-10-16	Montevideo, Uruguay	Balzo
Hartmann, Karl Amadeus	Concerto funebre	1940-02-29	St. Gallen, Switzerland	Neracher / St. Gallen Chamber Orchestra – Klug
Hindemith, Paul	Violin Concerto (1939)	1940-03-14	Amsterdam	Concertgebouw Orchestra
Khachaturian, Aram	Violin Concerto	1940-11-16	Moscow	Oistrakh / USSR State Symphony – Gauk
Krenek, Ernst	Little Concerto for Piano, Organ and Chamber Orchestra	1940-05-23	Poughkeepsie, New York	Williams, Geer / Vassar Orchestra – Krenek
Krenek, Ernst	Symphonisches Stück	1940-06-11	Basel	Basel Chamber Orchestra – Sacher
Larsson, Lars-Erik	God in Disguise	1940-04-01	Stockholm	Torlind, Hasslo, Molander / Swedish Radio Symphony – Larsson
Lilburn, Douglas	Aotearoa, overture	1940-04-15	London	Sadler's Welles Orchestra – Braithwaite
Milhaud, Darius	Symphony No. 1	1940-10-17	Chicago	Chicago Symphony – Milhaud
Myaskovsky, Nikolai	Symphony No. 20	1940-11-28	Moscow	USSR Radio Symphony – Golovanov
Piston, Walter	Violin Concerto No. 1	1940-03-18	New York City	Posselt / National Orchestral Association – Barzin
Price, Florence	Symphony No. 3 (Price)	1940-11-06	Little Rock, US	Detroit Civic Orchestra – Valter Poole
Prokofiev, Sergei	Piano Sonata No. 6	1940-04-08	Moscow	Prokofiev
Rodrigo, Joaquín	Concierto de Aranjuez	1940-11-09	Barcelona	Saenz de la Maza / Barcelona Philharmonic – Mendoza-Lasalle
Schoenberg, Arnold	Chamber Symphony No. 2	1940-12-15	New York City	Friends of New Music Orchestra – Stiedry
Schoenberg, Arnold	Violin Concerto (finished 1936)	1940-12-06	Philadelphia	Krasner / Philadelphia Orchestra – Stokowski
Shostakovich, Dmitri	Piano Quintet	1940-11-23	Moscow	Shostakovich, Beethoven Quartet
Shostakovich, Dmitri	Four Romances on Verses by Pushkin	1940-12-08	Moscow	Baturin, Shostakovich
Strauss, Richard	Japanese Festival Music	1940-12-14	Tokyo	Tokyo Broadcast Orchestra – Fellmer
Stravinsky, Igor	Symphony in C	1940-11-07	Chicago	Chicago Symphony – Stravinsky
Tippett, Michael	Concerto for Double String Orchestra	1940-04-21	London	South London Orchestra – Tippett
Webern, Anton	Fünf Lieder, Op. 4 (1909)	1940-02-10	Basel, Switzerland	Gradmann-Lüscher, Schmid

=== Compositions ===
- Granville Bantock – Celtic Symphony
- Samuel Barber – Violin Concerto
- Lennox Berkeley – Symphony No. 1
- Benjamin Britten – Sinfonia da Requiem
- Carlos Chávez –
  - Concerto for piano and orchestra
  - Xochipilli-Macuilxóchitl
- Aaron Copland – Episode, Music for Our Town
- Paul Creston – Symphony No. 1
- David Diamond – Concerto for Small Orchestra, String Quartet No. 1
- Hanns Eisler – Chamber Symphony
- George Enescu – Piano Quintet in A minor, Op. 29
- Evaristo Fernández Blanco – Dramatic Overture
- John Fernström – Symphony No. 6, Op. 51
- Vivian Fine – Suite in E Flat
- Jakov Gotovac – Guslar, Op. 22
- Roy Harris – Folksong Symphony
- Paul Hindemith – Cello Concerto, Symphony in E-flat
- Aram Khachaturian – Violin Concerto
- Gideon Klein – String Quartet, Op. 2
- László Lajtha – Cello Concerto
- Igor Markevitch – Lorenzo il Magnifico
- Frank Martin – Ballade for Trombone and Piano
- Olivier Messiaen – Quatuor pour la fin du temps (Quartet for the End of Time)
- Darius Milhaud – String Quartet No. 10
- Gösta Nystroem – Viola Concerto
- Willem Pijper – Six Adagios, for orchestra
- Walter Piston – Suite from The Incredible Flutist
- Sergei Rachmaninoff – Symphonic Dances
- Roger Sessions – From My Diary, for piano
- Igor Stravinsky – Symphony in C
- Eduard Tubin – Prelude Solennel
- William Walton – The Wise Virgins (ballet)
- Heitor Villa-Lobos – Five Preludes for guitar

== Opera ==
- Luigi Dallapiccola – Volo di notte, Florence, Teatro della Pergola, May 18.
- Sergei Prokofiev – Semyon Kotko (libretto by Prokofiev and Valentin Kataev), Moscow, Stanislavsky Opera Theatre, 23 June 1940.
- Geirr Tveitt – Dragaredokko (score lost: only a piano transcription exists)

== Film ==
- Aaron Copland – Our Town (1940 film)
- Leigh Harline – Pinocchio (1940 film)
- Erich Korngold – The Sea Hawk (1940 film)
- Miklós Rózsa – The Thief of Bagdad (1940 film)
- Dmitri Shostakovich – The Adventures of Korzinkina
- Franz Waxman – Rebecca

== Musical theatre ==
- Apple Sauce (Music and Lyrics: Michael Carr & Jack Strachey). London production opened at the Holborn Empire on August 27 and moved to the London Palladium on March 5, 1941, when the Holburn Empire was destroyed in the blitz. Total run 462 performances.
- The Beggar's Opera (Music and Lyrics: John Gay adapted by Frederic Austin). London revival opened at the Haymarket Theatre on March 5.
- Cabin in the Sky (Music: Vernon Duke Lyrics: John Latouche Book: Lynn Root). Broadway production opened on October 25 at the Martin Beck Theatre and ran for 156 performances
- Higher and Higher (Music: Richard Rodgers Lyrics: Lorenz Hart Book: Gladys Hurlbut and Joshua Logan) opened at the Shubert Theatre on April 4 and ran for 84 performances. It returned to the same theatre on August 5 for a further 24 performances.
- Hold On To Your Hats (Music: Burton Lane Lyrics: E. Y. Harburg Book: Eddie Davis, Guy Bolton and Matt Brooks). Broadway production opened at the Shubert Theatre on September 11 and ran for 158 performances
- Keep Off The Grass (Music: Jimmy McHugh Lyrics: Al Dubin and Howard Dietz). Broadway revue opened at the Broadhurst Theatre on May 23 and ran for 44 performances
- Louisiana Purchase (Music and Lyrics: Irving Berlin Book: Morrie Ryskind). Broadway production opened on May 28 at the Imperial Theatre and ran for 444 performances
- Meet the People Broadway production opened at the Mansfield Theatre on December 25 and ran for 160 performances.
- New Faces London revue opened at the Comedy Theatre on April 11 and moved to the Apollo Theatre on March 14, 1941.
- Pal Joey (Music: Richard Rodgers Lyrics: Lorenz Hart Book: John O'Hara) – Broadway production opened on December 25 at the Ethel Barrymore Theatre and ran for 374 performances
- Panama Hattie (Music and Lyrics: Cole Porter Book: Herbert Fields and B. G. DeSylva). Broadway production opened on October 30 at the 46th Street Theatre and ran for 501 performances
- Two for the Show Broadway revue opened at the Booth Theatre on February 11 and ran for 124 performances
- Walk With Music (Music: Hoagy Carmichael Lyrics: Johnny Mercer Book: Guy Bolton, Parke Levy and Alan Lipscott). Broadway production opened on June 4 at the Ethel Barrymore Theatre and ran for 55 performances
- The White Horse Inn (Music: Ralph Benatzky Lyrics and Book: Harry Graham). London revival opened on March 20 at the London Coliseum and ran for 268 performances until ended by bombing raids.

== Musical films ==
- The Boys from Syracuse, based on the 1938 Broadway play, starring Allan Jones, Irene Hervey, Martha Raye and Rosemary Lane
- Broadway Melody of 1940, starring Fred Astaire and Eleanor Powell
- Canto de amor, Argentine musical directed by Julio Irigoyen
- El Cantor de Buenos Aires, Argentine musical
- Gül Baba, Hungarian musical starring Sándor Kömíves and Zita Szeleczky
- If I Had My Way, starring Bing Crosby and Gloria Jean
- Irene, starring Anna Neagle, Ray Milland and Billie Burke
- It All Came True starring Ann Sheridan and Humphrey Bogart
- La canción del milagro, Mexican musical drama starring José Mojica
- Lillian Russell (film), starring Alice Faye, Don Ameche, Henry Fonda and Eddie Foy Jr.
- Little Nellie Kelly, starring Judy Garland, George Murphy and Charles Winninger. Directed by Norman Taurog.
- New Moon, starring Jeanette MacDonald and Nelson Eddy. Directed by Robert Z. Leonard.
- A Night at Earl Carroll's, released December 6
- No, No, Nanette, starring Anna Neagle, Richard Carlson, Victor Mature, Roland Young, Helen Broderick, Zasu Pitts and Eve Arden
- One Night in the Tropics, starring Allan Jones, Nancy Kelly, Bud Abbott and Lou Costello. Directed by A. Edward Sutherland.
- Pinocchio Walt Disney animated film
- Spring Parade, starring Deanna Durbin remake of 1934 film
- Too Many Girls, based on 1939 Broadway musical, starring Lucille Ball, Richard Carlson, Frances Langford, Ann Miller, Eddie Bracken and Desi Arnaz.
- Two Girls on Broadway, remake of 1929 film The Broadway Melody, starring Lana Turner, Joan Blondell and George Murphy.
- Young People, starring Shirley Temple. Directed by Allan Dwan.

== Births ==
- January 1 – László Sáry, Hungarian composer and pianist (died 2026)
- January 9 – Al Downing, American singer-songwriter and pianist (died 2005)
- January 11 – Sydney Devine, Scottish singer (died 2021)
- January 18 – Lindsay L. Cooper, Scottish jazz string player (died 2001)
- January 19 – Rudolf Jansen, Dutch pianist (died 2024)
- January 22 – Addie "Micki" Harris, American R&B vocalist (The Shirelles) (died 1982)
- January 23
  - Jimmy Castor, African-American funk, R&B and soul saxophonist (died 2012)
  - Joe Dowell, American singer (died 2016)
  - Johnny Russell, American singer-songwriter and guitarist (died 2001)
- January 28 – Trebor Jay Tichenor, American pianist and composer (died 2014)
- January 30 – David C. Johnson, American composer, flautist and live-electronic performer
- February 2 – Alan Caddy, English musician (The Tornados) (died 2000)
- February 3 – Angelo D'Aleo, American singer (Dion and the Belmonts)
- February 10
  - Jimmy Merchant, American singer (Frankie Lymon & The Teenagers)
  - Kenny Rankin, American jazz and pop singer-songwriter (died 2009)
- February 11 – Bobby 'Boris' Pickett, American singer (died 2007)
- February 12 – Gilda Cruz-Romo, Mexican operatic soprano (died 2025)
- February 19 – Smokey Robinson, American soul singer (The Miracles)
- February 20 – Barbara Ellis, American pop singer (The Fleetwoods)
- February 25 – Jesús López Cobos, Spanish conductor (died 2018)
- February 28 – Joe South, American singer songwriter (died 2012)
- February 29 – Gretchen Christopher, pop singer (The Fleetwoods)
- March 2 – Juraj Beneš, composer (died 2004)
- March 10 – Dean Torrence (Jan and Dean)
- March 12 – Al Jarreau, singer (died 2017)
- March 13 – Daniel Bennie (The Reflections)
- March 15 – Phil Lesh, rock bass guitarist (Grateful Dead) (died 2024)
- March 16 – Rock-Olga (Birgit Jacobsson), rock singer (died 2010)
- March 25
  - Anita Bryant, singer (died 2024)
  - Mina, singer
- March 27 – Derrick Morgan, ska musician
- March 29
  - Ray Davis, funk bass singer (Parliament, Funkadelic) (died 2005)
  - Astrud Gilberto, bossa nova singer (died 2023)
- April 1 – Annie Nightingale, radio music presenter (died 2024)
- April 12 – Herbie Hancock, jazz pianist and composer
- April 13 – Lester Chambers, soul rock singer (The Chambers Brothers)
- April 17 – Billy Fury, singer (died 1983)
- April 24 – Bayan Northcott, music critic and composer (died 2022)
- April 26 – Giorgio Moroder, record producer
- May 3
  - Conny Plank, sound engineer (died 1987)
  - Leif Rygg, Hardanger fiddle player (died 2018)
- May 8
  - Ricky Nelson, singer and actor (The Nelsons) (died 1985)
  - Toni Tennille (Captain & Tennille)
- May 15
  - Lainie Kazan, American actress and singer
  - Lena Martell, Scottish singer (died 2026)
- May 19 – Mickey Newbury, songwriter (died 2002)
- May 21 – Tony Sheridan, rock singer-songwriter and guitarist (died 2013)
- May 26 – Levon Helm, American rock vocalist/drummer (The Band) (died 2012)
- June 7 – Tom Jones, singer
- June 8
  - Sherman Garnes (Frankie Lymon & The Teenagers) (died 1977)
  - Nancy Sinatra, singer
- June 13 – Bobby Freeman, soul singer (died 2017)
- June 23
  - Adam Faith, born Terry Nelhams, pop singer, screen actor and financial journalist (died 2003)
  - Stuart Sutcliffe, rock bass guitarist (The Beatles) and artist (died 1962)
  - Diana Trask, Australian-born country and pop singer
- July 4
  - Helen Quach, Vietnamese-born orchestral conductor (died 2013)
  - Dave Rowberry, rock pianist and songwriter (The Animals) (died 2003)
- July 6 – Jeannie Seely, American singer-songwriter and actress
- July 7 – Ringo Starr, rock drummer (The Beatles)
- July 13 – Patrick Stewart, English-American actor (died 2026)
- July 16 – Tony Jackson, singer and bass guitarist (The Searchers) (died 2003)
- July 22 – Thomas Wayne, American singer (died 1971)
- August 10 – Bobby Hatfield, singer (The Righteous Brothers) (died 2003)
- August 12 – Tony Allen, Afrobeat drummer (died 2020)
- August 14 – Dash Crofts, Seals and Crofts
- August 19
  - Roger Cook, songwriter
  - Johnny Nash, reggae singer (died 2020)
- August 31 – Wilton Felder, jazz saxophonist (The Crusaders) (died 2015)
- September 2 – Jimmy Clanton, singer
- September 6 – Jackie Trent, born Yvonne Burgess, songwriter (died 2015)
- September 9 – Joe Negroni (Frankie Lymon & The Teenagers) (died 1978)
- September 10 – Dickie Rock, singer
- September 17 – Lamonte McLemore, vocalist (The 5th Dimension)
- September 19 – Bill Medley, singer (The Righteous Brothers)
- September 30 – Dewey Martin, rock drummer (Buffalo Springfield) (died 2009)
- October 1 – Atarah Ben-Tovim, flautist and children's concert promoter (died 2022)
- October 8 – Fred Cash, soul singer (The Impressions)
- October 9 – John Lennon, rock singer-songwriter (murdered 1980)
- October 14 – Cliff Richard, singer
- October 17 – Stephen Kovacevich, pianist
- October 18 – Cynthia Weil, songwriter (died 2023)
- October 19 – Larry Chance, doo-wop singer (The Earls)
- October 21
  - Jimmy Beaumont, doo-wop singer (The Skyliners) (died 2017)
  - Manfred Mann, born Manfred Lubowitz, rock keyboardist and singer-songwriter (Manfred Mann)
- October 23 – Ellie Greenwich, songwriter (died 2009)
- October 31 – Eric Griffiths, skiffle guitarist (The Quarrymen) (died 2005)
- November 2 – Hugo Raspoet, folk singer (died 2018).
- November 4 – Delbert McClinton, singer-songwriter
- November 17 – Luke Kelly, folk musician (The Dubliners) (died 1984)
- November 25 – Percy Sledge, singer (died 2015)
- November 28 – Bruce Channel, singer
- November 29
  - Seán Cannon, Irish folk musician
  - Mark James, born Francis Zambon, songwriter (died 2024)
  - Chuck Mangione, flugelhorn player and composer (died 2025)
- December 9 – Clancy Eccles, Jamaican ska/reggae singer (died 2005)
- December 11 – David Gates, American singer-songwriter (Bread)
- December 12 – Dionne Warwick, American singer
- December 19 – Phil Ochs, American protest singer (died 1976)
- December 21
  - Ray Hildebrand, American singer (Paul & Paula)
  - Frank Zappa, American guitarist and composer (died 1993)
- December 23
  - Tim Hardin, American folk singer (died 1980)
  - Jorma Kaukonen, American guitarist (Jefferson Airplane, Hot Tuna)
  - Eugene Record, American singer (The Chi-Lites) (died 2005)
- December 28
  - Lonnie Liston Smith, American jazz and funk musician
  - Kurt Widmer, Swiss opera singer and voice coach (died 2023)

== Deaths ==
- January 7
  - Carl Boberg, hymn-writer, 80
  - Effie Crockett, composer of "Rock-a-Bye Baby", 83
- February 2 – Nikolay Kedrov Sr., composer, 68
- February 4 – Albert Ham, English and Canadian organist, choral conductor, and composer, 81
- February 17 – Gus Elen, music hall singer, 77
- February 28 – Arnold Dolmetsch, musical instrument maker, 82
- March 18 – Lola Beeth, operatic soprano, 78
- March 25 – Nonna Otescu, composer, 51
- April 9 – Rosa Newmarch, music writer, 82
- April 18 – Florrie Forde, Australian-born English music hall singer, 64
- April 28 – Luisa Tetrazzini, soprano, 68
- May 23 – Andrey Rimsky-Korsakov, musicologist, 61
- May 29 – Mathilda Grabow, operatic soprano, 88
- June 8 – Frederick Converse, composer, 69
- June 19 – Albert Reiss, operatic tenor, 70
- June 20
  - Jehan Alain, organist and composer, 29 (killed in action)
  - Emma Nevada, operatic soprano, 81
- July 10 – Sir Donald Francis Tovey, musicologist and composer, 64
- August 8
  - Alessandro Bonci, operatic tenor, 70
  - Johnny Dodds, jazz musician, 48 (heart attack)
- August 10 – Alessandro Bonci, lyric tenor, 70
- August 16 – Eduard Sõrmus, Estonian violinist, 62
- August 21 – Paul Juon, composer and teacher, 68
- August 29 – Arthur De Greef, pianist and composer, 77
- September 2 – Giulio Gatti-Casazza, director of the Metropolitan Opera, 71
- September 30 – Walter Kollo, operetta composer, 62
- October 5 – Silvestre Revueltas, composer, 40 (pneumonia)
- November 6 – Ivar F. Andresen, operatic bass, 44
- November 12 – Alejandro García Caturla, composer, 34
- November 22 – Jorge Bravo de Rueda, pianist and composer, 45
- November 23 – Billy Jones, US singer, 51
- December 3 – Walborg Lagerwall, Swedish cellist, 89
- December 5 – Jan Kubelik, violinist, 60
- December 11 – J. Harold Murray, baritone, 49 (nephritis)
- December 15 – Blanche Marchesi, mezzo-soprano and voice teacher, 77
- December 16 – William Wallace, composer, 80
- December 21 – Hal Kemp, jazz musician and bandleader, 36 (complications following car accident)
- December 24 – Billy Hill, songwriter, 41
- date unknown – Marguerite Ugalde, operatic mezzo-soprano (born 1862)
