= Op. 84 =

In music, Op. 84 stands for Opus number 84. Compositions that are assigned this number include:

- Aleš – The Jacobin
- Beethoven – Egmont
- Dvořák – The Jacobin
- Elgar – Piano Quintet
- Prokofiev – Piano Sonata No. 8
- Schumann – Beim Abschied zu singen for chorus & winds
- Strauss – Japanese Festival Music
