= Cabin in the Sky (film) =

1943 American musical film with an all-Black cast, directed by Vincente Minnelli

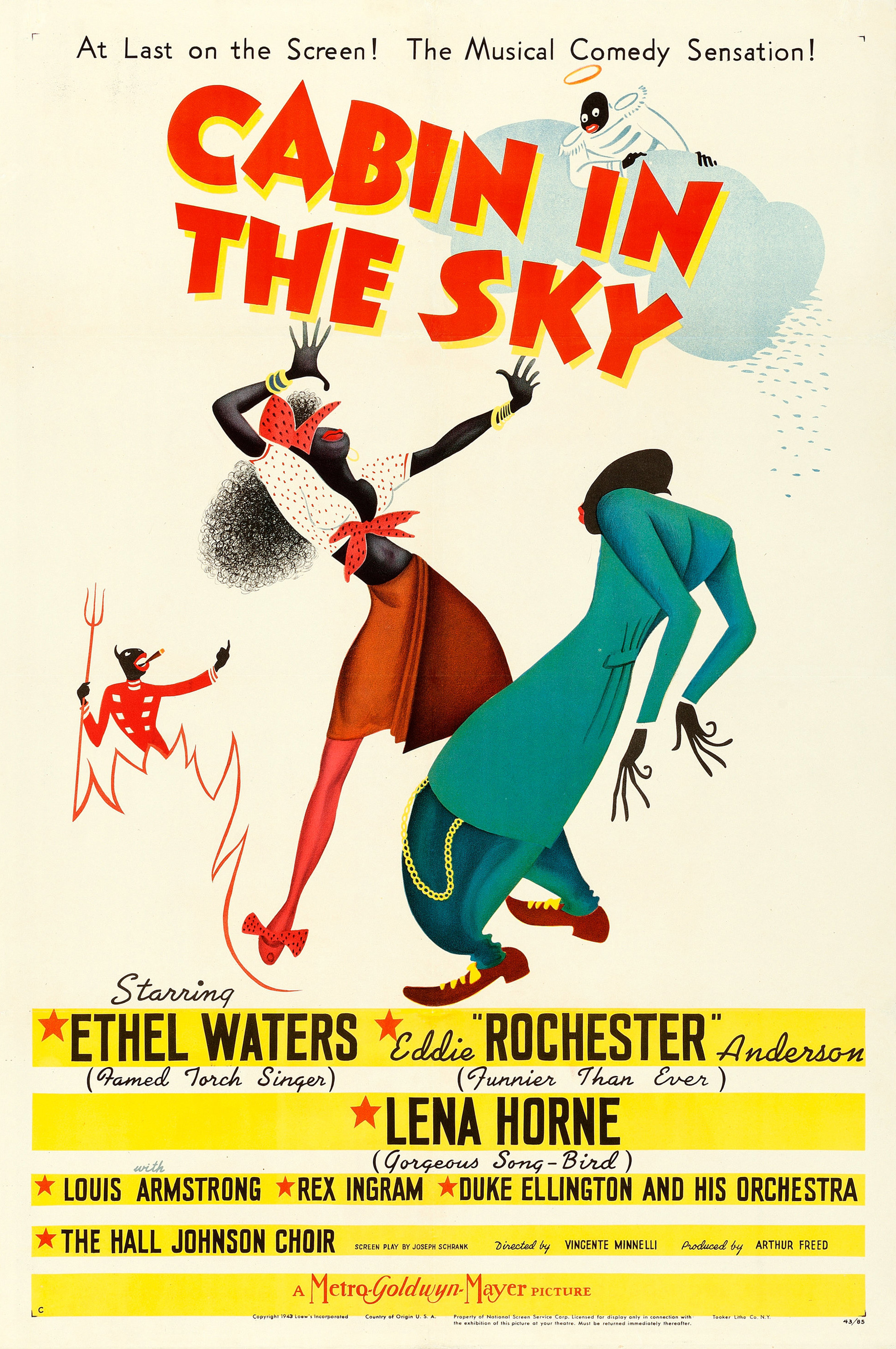
- Theatrical release poster by Al Hirschfeld
- Directed by: Vincente Minnelli; Busby Berkeley ("Shine" sequence, uncredited)
- Written by: Marc Connelly (uncredited); Lynn Root (play); Joseph Schrank
- Based on: Cabin in the Sky; 1940 musical by Vernon Duke; John La Touche
- Produced by: Arthur Freed; Albert Lewis
- Starring: Ethel Waters; Eddie "Rochester" Anderson; Lena Horne; Rex Ingram; Louis Armstrong
- Cinematography: Sidney Wagner
- Edited by: Harold F. Kress
- Music by: Roger Edens; Georgie Stoll; George Bassman; Hall Johnson
- Production company: Metro-Goldwyn-Mayer
- Distributed by: Loew's, Inc.
- Release date: April 9, 1943
- Running time: 98 minutes
- Country: United States
- Language: English
- Budget: $679,000
- Box office: $1,953,000

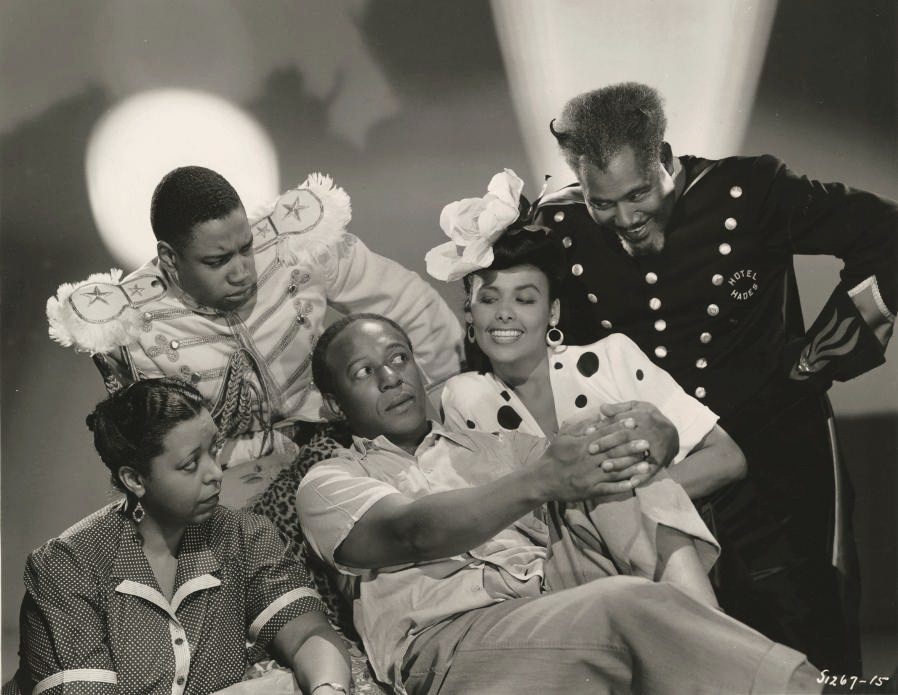
L-R: Ethel Waters, Kenneth Spencer, Eddie Anderson, Lena Horne, and Rex Ingram

Cabin in the Sky is a 1943 American musical film based on the 1940 Broadway musical of the same name. The first feature film directed by Vincente Minnelli, Cabin in the Sky features an all-black cast and stars Ethel Waters, Eddie "Rochester" Anderson and Lena Horne. Waters and Rex Ingram reprise their roles from the Broadway production as Petunia and Lucifer Junior, respectively. The film was Horne's first and only leading role in an MGM musical. Louis Armstrong is also featured in the film as one of Lucifer Junior's minions, and Duke Ellington and his Orchestra have a showcase musical number in the film.

In 2020, the film was selected for preservation in the United States National Film Registry by the Library of Congress as being "culturally, historically, or aesthetically significant."

== Plot ==
Little Joe is a well-meaning yet weak man, whose attempts at redemption are cut short when he is killed over gambling debts by big-shot Domino Johnson. On his deathbed, Little Joe is resurrected by angelic powers and given six months to redeem his soul and become worthy of entering Heaven—otherwise he will be condemned to Hell. Secretly guided by "The General" (the Lord's Angel), Little Joe gives up his shiftless ways and becomes a hardworking, generous, and loving husband to his wife Petunia, whom he had previously neglected.

Demon Lucifer Jr. (the son of Satan himself) is determined to drag Little Joe to Hell and attempts to do so in many ways, including by arranging for Joe to become wealthy by winning a lottery; reintroducing Joe to a beautiful gold-digger, Georgia Brown; and manipulating the marital discord between Joe and Petunia. His tactics work: Little Joe abandons his wife for Georgia, and the two embark on a life of hedonistic pleasure.

As Little Joe and Georgia celebrate at a nightclub one evening, Petunia joins them, determined to win Joe back. Little Joe fights with Domino for Petunia, and Petunia, anguished at this turn of events, prays to God to destroy the nightclub. A tornado appears and leaves the nightclub in ruins, as Joe and Petunia lie dead in the ruins after being shot by Domino. Just as it appears that Joe's soul is lost forever, the angelic General informs him that Georgia Brown was so affected by the tragedy that she has donated all the money that Joe had lavished upon her to the church. On this technicality, Little Joe is allowed to go to Heaven with Petunia.

As the two climb the "Celestial Stairs", Joe suddenly wakes in his own bed. Joe had not been killed in the fracas, only wounded. All his dealings with angels and demons were only a fever dream. Now reformed, Little Joe begins a new happy life with Petunia.

== Cast ==
- Ethel Waters as Petunia Jackson
- Eddie "Rochester" Anderson as Little Joe Jackson
- Lena Horne as Georgia Brown
- Louis Armstrong as The Trumpeter
- Rex Ingram as Lucius / Lucifer Jr.
- Kenneth Spencer as The General / Rev. Green
- "Bubbles" John W. Sublett as Domino Johnson
- Oscar Polk as The Deacon / Fleetfoot
- Mantan Moreland as First Idea Man
- Willie Best as Second Idea Man
- Fletcher Rivers as Third Idea Man (as Moke Fletcher Rivers, Rivers and Leon James were a comedy team named Moke and Poke
- Leon James Poke as Fourth Idea Man (as Poke Leon James)
- Bill Bailey as Bill
- "Buck" Ford L. Washington as Messenger Boy
- Butterfly McQueen as Lily
- Ruby Dandridge as Mrs. Kelso
- Nicodemus as Dude
- Ernest Whitman as Jim Henry
- Duke Ellington and his Orchestra
- The Hall Johnson Choir

== Production ==
According to notes within the reissue of the CD soundtrack, Freed and Minnelli sought input from black leaders before production began on the film.

The script was submitted before production to the NAACP. In a letter to the editor in The New York Times, a writer of the film said he received a letter "congratulating [them] on the treatment of this black fable, which avoided clichés and racial stereotypes."

Stock footage of Arnold Gillespie's famous muslin-sock tornado from The Wizard of Oz was reused in this film for the scene where the cyclone destroys the nightclub.

== Songs ==
1. "Little Black Sheep" (music by Harold Arlen, lyrics by Yip Harburg) – Ethel Waters and Chorus
2. "Old Ship of Zion" – Chorus
3. "Happiness is a Thing Called Joe" (by Arlen and Harburg) – Ethel Waters
4. "Cabin in the Sky" (music by Vernon Duke, lyrics by John La Touche (lyricist)) – Ethel Waters & Eddie "Rochester" Anderson
5. "Taking a Chance on Love" (music by Duke, lyrics by La Touche and Ted Fetter) – Ethel Waters
6. "Life is Full of Consequence" (by Arlen and Harburg) – Lena Horne & Eddie "Rochester" Anderson
7. "Things Ain't What They Used To Be" (by Mercer Ellington) – Duke Ellington and his orchestra
8. "Going Up" (by Duke Ellington) – Duke Ellington and his orchestra
9. "Shine" – "Bubbles" John W. Sublett (video via YouTube)
10. "Honey in the Honeycomb" (by Duke and La Touche) – Lena Horne
11. "Honey in the Honeycomb (Reprise)" – Lena Horne & Ethel Waters

=== Deleted songs ===
One musical number, in which Horne sings a reprise of "Ain't It the Truth" (by Arlen and Harburg) while taking a bubble bath, was cut from the film prior to release, though it later appeared in a 1946 Pete Smith short subject entitled Studio Visit. According to Horne speaking in the documentary That's Entertainment! III (1994) (in which the excised performance was also featured), the consensus was thought to be that the showing of a black woman singing in a bath went beyond the bounds of moral decency in 1943. A second non-bubble bath (and third overall) performance of this song by Louis Armstrong was also cut from the final print, resulting in Armstrong having no solo musical number in the film. Armstrong's recording of "Ain't it the Truth" survives and is included on the later CD release of the film's original soundtrack. The song's authors and Lena Horne collaborated on their Broadway musical Jamaica starring Horne, in which they recycled the song as part of the score as a solo for her.

== Film promotion ==
MGM held a trade show of the film on February 9, 1943, in Denver, Salt Lake City, and San Francisco. Another show was held on February 11 in Portland, Los Angeles and Seattle.

For promotional purposes, records were produced for two musical numbers: "Cabin in the Sky" and "Taking a Chance on Love."

Marian McCullough from Loews in Dayton had cooperated with local hotels to place a sign at each registry desk that read, "Ps-s-t! If they don't have a room, come over to Loew's....We have a great big "Cabin in the Sky."

The Orpheum Theatre in Springfield, Illinois placed advertisements in the classified section of newspapers that read, "This Cabin for Rent, and with it goes plenty of entertainment for all." The ad came with a small cutout of a cabin.

Jack Matlack's campaign at the Broadway theater in Portland had the theater staff in blackface and gingham-dressed.

=== Showmen's Trade Review ===
At a screening of the film, Showmen's Trade Review gathered and listed possible ideas for theaters to promote the film. Newspapers and radios were encouraged to hold contests where viewers were to submit, dreams, recipes that use inexpensive ingredients, the furnishing and construction of their ideal "Cabin in the Sky," or incidents they have personally experienced using "luck charms." A "Go to Church Sunday" campaign included offering discounts on tickets for congregations to bring in new worshipers. For the stage, choral groups or amateur night with comedy, singing and dancing nights were suggested. For the lobby, a trio of boys singing and dancing where boys could throw large, 12-inch square dice was suggested. To play on Eddie Rochester Anderson's difficulty with his necktie in the film, it was suggested to borrow mannequins and hold a tie tying contest where the top ten fastest contestants gain free admission.

While the article did suggest that these activities were held using people of color, it closed out by emphasizing that focus of an all-black cast should not be used as the main selling points as it would sell "through confidence that it will be enthusiastically received by [the] customers."

== Reception ==
In the 1940s, movie theaters in many cities, particularly in the southern United States, refused to show films with prominent black performers. On July 29, 1943, in Mt. Pleasant, Tennessee, the film was pulled after the first 30 minutes on orders from the local sheriff. A crowd gathered outside the theater and someone threatened to "pull the switch."

The film was nominated for an Academy Award for Best Original Song for "Happiness Is a Thing Called Joe" sung by Ethel Waters.

According to MGM records the film made $1,719,000 in the US and Canada and $234,000 elsewhere, resulting in a profit of $587,000.

After years of unavailability, Warner Home Video (via Turner Entertainment Co.) released Cabin in the Sky on DVD on January 10, 2006. Warner Archive Collection released this film for the first time on Blu-ray, sourced from the latest 4K scan of the best preservation elements, in January 2024.

On Rotten Tomatoes, the film holds a rating of 81% from 47 reviews and an average rating of 7.2/10. The website's critics consensus reads, "Cabin in the Sky's racial stereotypes are impossible to ignore – but so are its irresistible musical numbers and brilliantly talented cast."

== See also ==
- List of films about angels
