= Rex Ingram =

Rex Ingram may refer to:

- Rex Ingram (director) (1892–1950), Irish film director, producer, writer and actor
- Rex Ingram (actor) (1895–1969), American film and stage actor
