= The Adventures of Huckleberry Finn (1939 film) =

1939 film by Richard Thorpe

- Theatrical release poster
- Directed by: Richard Thorpe
- Written by: Hugo Butler; Waldo Salt (uncredited dialogue)
- Based on: Adventures of Huckleberry Finn; 1884 novel by Mark Twain
- Produced by: Joseph L. Mankiewicz
- Starring: Mickey Rooney; Walter Connolly; William Frawley; Rex Ingram
- Cinematography: John F. Seitz
- Edited by: Frank E. Hull; Harold F. Kress (sup.)
- Music by: Franz Waxman
- Color process: Black and white
- Production company: Metro-Goldwyn-Mayer
- Distributed by: Loew's Inc.
- Release date: February 10, 1939
- Running time: 92 minutes
- Country: United States
- Language: English

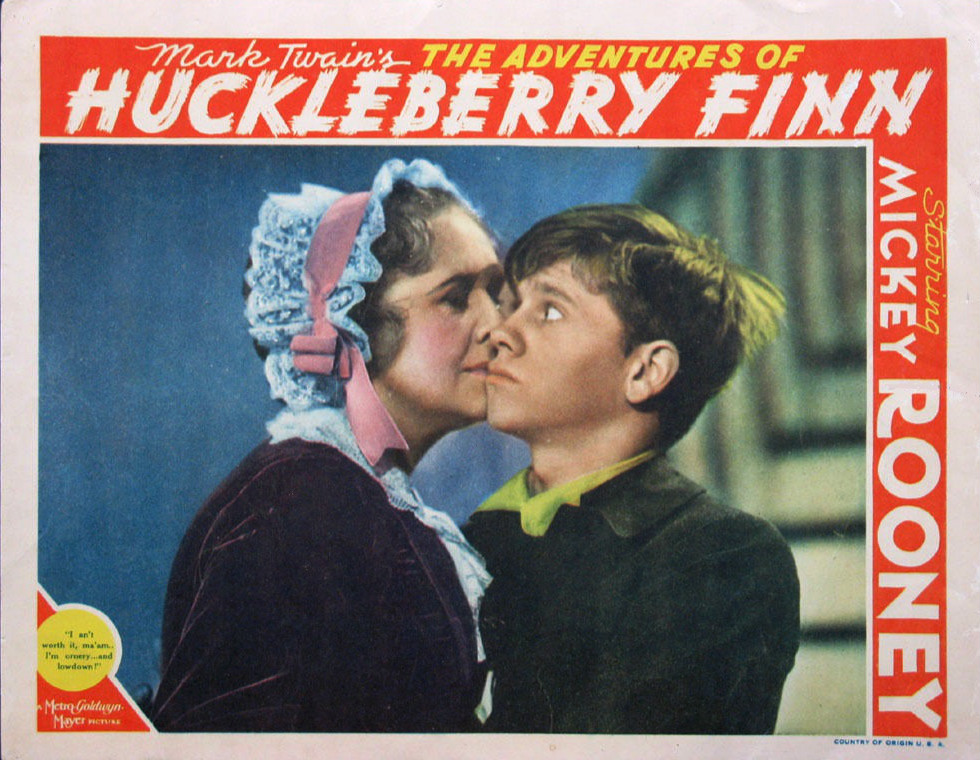
Elisabeth Risdon and Mickey Rooney

The Adventures of Huckleberry Finn is a 1939 Metro-Goldwyn-Mayer film adaptation of Mark Twain's 1884 novel of the same name, starring Mickey Rooney in the title role. The supporting cast features Walter Connolly, William Frawley and Rex Ingram.

== Plot ==
In an 1840s schoolroom in St. Petersburg, Mo., a schoolteacher warns her students about associating with Huckleberry Finn, whom she calls "a very unhappy boy." After school, Ben, Joe, Sam, Harry and Elliot find Huck at the fishing hole, relaxed and carefree. The boys warn him that the teacher plans to visit the Widow Douglas, Huck’s guardian, to tell her Huck will not get promoted because of his poor attendance. One of the boys suggests Huck should run away and live with his Pap, but Huck rejects the idea. The boys look on enviously as Huck puffs on his corncob pipe. Elliot persuades Huck to let him try smoking it but, after a few whiffs, he becomes ill. The kindly Widow gives Huck a new knife as a present for his forthcoming promotion, which makes Huck feel guilty. After supper, Huck meets up with Jim, the Widow’s slave and Huck's friend, who longs to be reunited with his wife, who is now far away in Illinois. Huck smokes his pipe in secret until Miss Watson, the Widow's stern sister, calls him in for Bible reading. Huck tries to hide the still-burning pipe in his pocket, but the deception is revealed when his jacket catches fire. The Widow takes Huck aside and sympathetically listens to his explanations until Huck retires to bed. But waiting in Huck’s bedroom is his vicious, desperate father, who plans to strong-arm the Widow into paying $800 to retain custody of Huck. Soon afterward, Huck tries to leave town but is captured by his Pap and imprisoned in a shabby cabin.

When his Pap is out, Huck stages his own murder and steals away to Jackson’s Island in a skiff. There, he is surprised to meet Jim, who has run off from the Widow’s house because he overheard the Widow talking about selling him to raise the $800. Huck disguises himself as a girl to go into town where he learns Jim has been accused of murdering Huck and vigilantes are trying to track him down. Huck and Jim raft down the river and encounter an abandoned houseboat, where Jim finds the body of Huck’s Pap; Jim decides to keep the discovery a secret. They set a course for Cairo, Illinois, a free state where Jim will be safe.

Along the way, Huck and Jim help out two men thrown off a riverboat, a pair who claim to be the Duke of Bilgewater and Louis XVII, the rightful king of France. They are actually down-on-their-luck actors and con men who see an opportunity when they spot a notice promising a $1000 reward for an escaped slave matching Jim’s description. After an atrocious performance of Shakespeare’s “Romeo and Juliet” – with Huck as Juliet – provokes an angry reaction from the audience, Huck, the Duke and the Dauphin flee the theater and return to join Jim on the raft. Moving on the next town, the Duke and Dauphin enlist Huck’s aid in a plot to swindle two bereaved young women, Susan and Mary Jane Wilkes, out of a fortune by pretending to be their long-lost uncles. Captain Brandy, the best friend of the deceased, quickly sees through the masquerade, although the guileless Susan and Mary Jane refuse to believe the men are impostors. Captain Brandy makes a deal with Huck: If Huck will help expose the plan, Captain Brandy will take Jim and Huck to a free state aboard his steamship. The Duke and Dauphin try to get revenge on Huck by reporting Jim to the sheriff.

Jim finally confesses to Huck that the dead man aboard the houseboat was Huck’s Pap, a revelation that shocks and infuriates Huck. But the two are forced to reconcile when lawmen show up, eager to capture Jim. Just as it looks like Huck and Jim will make a clean getaway, Huck is bitten by a rattlesnake and Jim risks capture to take Huck to a doctor. While Huck recovers at the Wilkes home, Captain Brandy is forced to send Jim back to St. Petersburg to stand trial for murder. When Huck finds out about Jim’s situation, he begs Captain Brandy to take him home on the steamboat. Although flooding and rough waters make the journey perilous, the boat arrives in the nick of time and Huck saves Jim from a would-be lynching party. Huck also persuades the Widow to let Jim go free. She agrees, but only if Huck promises to attend school, wear shoes and stop smoking. Huck acquiesces and grudgingly relinquishes his corncob pipe to Captain Brandy. But the next day, as the Widow and Huck watch Jim sail away to freedom, it's revealed Huck has left behind his shoes on the dock – and has a corncob tucked in his back pocket.

== Cast ==
- Mickey Rooney as Huckleberry Finn
- Walter Connolly as the "King"
- William Frawley as the "Duke"
- Rex Ingram as Jim
- Lynne Carver as Mary Jane
- Jo Ann Sayers as Susan
- Minor Watson as Captain Brandy
- Elisabeth Risdon as the widow Douglas
- Victor Kilian as "Pap" Finn
- Clara Blandick as Miss Watson
- Harry Cording as Man Stealing Watermelon (uncredited)
- Frank Darien as Old Jailer (uncredited)

== Reception ==
Most critics found the film mediocre. B. R. Crisler of The New York Times felt that the picture was "more Mickey than Huckleberry" and called it an "average, workmanlike piece of cinematic hokum" that "affords little, if any, insight into the realistic boyhood world of which old Mark wrote with such imperishable humor." A reviewer for Variety magazine wrote that the adaptation "has not been able to catch the rare and sparkling humor and general sincerity of the author's original. Furthermore, young Rooney seems too mature and assured in manner and expression for his years. Although he troupes in fine style, the impression remains that it's a theatric presentation."

Film Daily called the treatment of the story "very flat and mechanical and uninteresting," adding, "Mickey Rooney does his best, and his fans may accept him as he appears and think he is great. To the lovers of Mark Twain it can only prove a disappointment." Harrison's Reports called it "just fairly good entertainment." John Mosher of The New Yorker called it "a perfunctory, commonplace job, pretty creaky and in the manner of those revival pieces some think quaint ... Aside from being a step for Mr. Rooney, this picture accomplishes nothing."

== See also ==
- List of films featuring slavery
