= Taking a Chance on Love =

Song
- Published: 1940 by Leo Feist, Inc.
- Composer: Vernon Duke
- Lyricists: John La Touche and Ted Fetter

"Taking a Chance on Love" is a popular song from the 1940 Broadway musical Cabin in the Sky. The piece is in 4/4 time. It was introduced by Ethel Waters playing the role of Petunia Jackson both on Broadway and later in the 1943 MGM musical Cabin in the Sky. The song was written by Vernon Duke with lyrics by John La Touche and Ted Fetter (see 1940 in music). It has become a standard. Several songs from the Broadway musical were released as a 3-record shellac set under the title "The Music of Cabin in the Sky featuring Ethel Waters" in 1940.

== Cover versions ==
Since the original recording, "Taking a Chance on Love" has become part of the American Songbook and has been sung and recorded by many prominent performers, including Hazel Scott in the Vincente Minnelli 1943 film I Dood It, Frank Sinatra, Ella Fitzgerald, Tony Bennett and Nancy Wilson on her 2006 Grammy Award-winning Turned to Blue album

In 1943, a reissue of the Benny Goodman cover featuring Helen Forrest (which was recorded and previously released in 1940) reached No. 1, as well as reaching No. 10 on the Harlem Hit Parade chart. Sammy Kaye also enjoyed chart success in 1943, reaching the No. 13 position.
