= The Bill Cosby Show =

American sitcom television series (1969–1971)

- Genre: Sitcom
- Created by: Ed. Weinberger; Bill Cosby; Michael Zagor
- Starring: Bill Cosby
- Theme music composer: Quincy Jones; Bill Cosby
- Opening theme: "Hikky Burr"
- Composer: Quincy Jones
- Country of origin: United States
- Original language: English
- No. of seasons: 2
- No. of episodes: 52

Production
- Producers: Marvin Miller; Ed. Weinberger
- Running time: 22–24 minutes
- Production companies: Jemmin, Inc.

Original release
- Network: NBC
- Release: September 14, 1969 – March 21, 1971

The Bill Cosby Show is an American sitcom television series that aired for two seasons on NBC's Sunday night schedule from 1969 until 1971 under the sponsorship of Procter & Gamble. There were 52 episodes made in the series. It marked Bill Cosby's first solo foray in television after his co-starring role with Robert Culp in I Spy.

The series also marked the first time an African American starred in their own eponymous comedy series.

== Synopsis ==
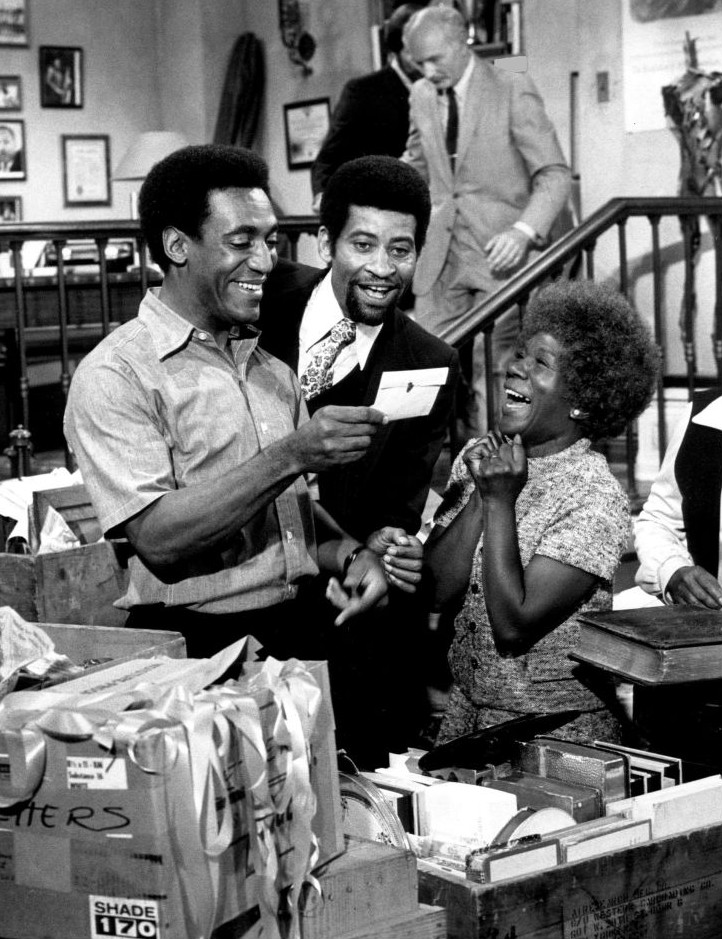
Cosby as Chet Kincaid with Rupert Crosse and Beah Richards, 1970.

Cosby played the role of Chet Kincaid, a physical education teacher at a Los Angeles high school, a bachelor, and an "average cool guy" trying to earn a living and help people out along the way. The show ran for two seasons, 52 episodes in all. While only a modest critical success, the series was nominated for two Primetime Emmys.

The Bill Cosby Show was a ratings hit, finishing eleventh in its first season. With the high school as the setting of most episodes, storylines involve life lessons, students and fellow teachers, family drama, a coach's purview, and a few challenging forays, such as a substitute teacher of algebra or English.

Cosby was lauded for having classic African American performers appear, such as Lillian Randolph (as Kincaid's mother) and Rex Ingram. Well-known stars who rarely did television appeared as well, including Henry Fonda and veteran comedians Mantan Moreland and Moms Mabley as Kincaid's feuding uncle and aunt.

The show's brass-heavy, funky theme song, "Hikky Burr", was written by Cosby and Quincy Jones, with Cosby providing the vocals. A new version of the theme was recorded for the second season.

The show did not use a laugh track; in that regard it was unique among half-hour situation comedies at the time. Cosby and NBC were at odds over his refusal to include a laugh track in the show. Cosby felt that viewers were intelligent enough to find the humor themselves, without being prompted.

While a few comedy dramas already aired without laugh tracks, few sitcoms went without, with most sitcoms filmed before a studio audience. The handful of non-drama sitcoms without a laugh track or studio audience prior to this included The Trouble with Father and The Beulah Show.

== Episodes ==
=== Season 1 (1969–70) ===
No. overall	No. in season	Title	Directed by	Written by	Original release date
1	1	"The Fatal Phone Call"	Harvey Hart	Dave Evans	September 14, 1969
While out jogging, Chet hears the telephone ringing inside a phone booth. He hesitates, but decides to answer. As a result, Chet ends up getting involved in a dispute between an auto mechanic and his wife. In an interesting twist, a case of mistaken identity in which Chet is involved brings this episode to a close. Guest star: Vic Tayback as Calvin the mechanic. Series Premiere
2	2	"Lullaby and Goodnight"	Tyler Barnes Grady	Ed. Weinberger	September 21, 1969
Chet is having difficulty sleeping at night, due to the new neighbour across the street whose dog won't stop barking.
3	3	"The Best Hook Shot in the World"	Harvey Hart	Ed. Weinberger	September 28, 1969
A short, but talented youngster with an unusual hook shot is determined to make the Holmes High School basketball team, where Chet is coach. He makes the team, after defeating Chet in a game of one on one. It's the day of the big game, Chet and the team pin their hopes on the little guy and his hook shot to win the game.
4	4	"A Girl Named Punkin"	Seymour Robbie	Lou Shaw, Ed. Weinberger	October 5, 1969
Chet does volunteer work for the local community center, a place for underprivileged children. He is having problems with Punkin, a young girl who is unresponsive and stays to herself. Chet eventually breaks through, and Punkin comes around. A touching scene where Chet tells Punkin a bedtime story and teaches her a lesson in love and caring at the same time is the high point of this episode.
5	5	"Rules Is Rules"	Jay Sandrich	John C. Lamonte	October 12, 1969
Chet goes to great lengths to obtain a valve needle which he needs in order to inflate basketballs for his gym class.
6	6	"Let X Equal a Lousy Weekend"	Jay Sandrich	Michael Elias, Frank Shaw	October 26, 1969
Chet is asked to be substitute teacher in an algebra class. Chet and the students have a difficult time arriving at the answer for one particular problem involving candy being sold at varying amounts per pound. Chet spends the weekend trying to solve the problem, he even visits a candy store to try to purchase the correct amounts of candy.
7	7	"To Kincaid, with Love"	Elliott Lewis	Paul Wayne (as Haskell Gray)	November 2, 1969
Chet is receiving attention from a female student of the high school. He thinks she has a crush on him, but the girl is actually trying to set Chet up with her mother.
8	8	"The Killer Instinct"	Herb Wallerstein	Lee Karson	November 9, 1969
Chet is having problems with a proud father who insists that his son make the high school football team. Trouble is, the kid just doesn't have what it takes and is not cut out to play football.
9	9	"The Substitute"	Jay Sandrich	Ed. Weinberger	November 16, 1969
Chet starts dating a substitute teacher from the high school, and has difficulty finding time to spend alone with her.
10	10	"Brotherly Love"	Ralph Senensky	Ed. Weinberger	November 23, 1969
Chet's brother Brian moves in with Chet after having an argument with his wife. Brian spoils Chet's plans for the evening, then hilarity ensues when they attempt to sleep in the same bed together.
11	11	"Going the Route"	Lee Philips	Dee Caruso, Gerald Gardner	November 30, 1969
Chet's nephew is in bed with a cold. Chet is asked and agrees to substitute for his nephew in the morning paper route.
12	12	"A Word from Our Sponsor"	Sid McCoy	Marvin Kaplan	December 7, 1969
Chet does a television commercial for a morning breakfast cereal, with disastrous results. Guest Stars: Alan Oppenheimer; Mike Farrell also makes a brief cameo appearance.
13	13	"A Christmas Ballad"	Ralph Senensky	Milton R.F. Brown	December 21, 1969
Chet helps a down on his luck old timer capture the spirit of Christmas. Guest star: Rex Ingram (in his final role)
14	14	"Home Remedy"	Richard Kinon	Ed. Weinberger	December 28, 1969
Chet is home with a cold, and is unable to rest because all his relatives come over offering their cure alls and remedies.
15	15	"Growing Growing Grown"	Ralph Senensky	Gail Parent, Kenny Solms	January 4, 1970
Chet is asked to chaperone at a high school dance. Chet's car is not available, so he ends up borrowing his brother's garbage truck to drive his date to the dance. At the dance, Chet teaches one student a lesson in the importance of physical appearance.
16	16	"The Elevator Doesn't Stop Here Anymore"	Coby Ruskin	Stan Daniels	January 11, 1970
Chet gets stuck inside an elevator at the high school along with one other faculty member and the school's cleaning lady. They entertain each other until help arrives. Guest stars: Henry Fonda as a faculty member, Elsa Lanchester as the school's cleaning lady.
17	17	"Lover's Quarrel"	Coby Ruskin	Milton R.F. Brown (uncredited), Ed. Weinberger	January 18, 1970
Chet tries to get his ever arguing aunt and uncle to stop fighting and treat each other with kindness and respect. Veteran actors Mantan Moreland and Jackie "Moms" Mabley guest star as the bickering old couple.
18	18	"The Worst Crook That Ever Lived"	Jay Sandrich	Steven Pritzker, Ed. Weinberger	January 25, 1970
Chet is asked to help straighten out Raymond, a youngster who has a penchant for stealing. In an effort to keep Raymond out of trouble, Chet finds a spot for him on his little league baseball team. But Raymond steals the money that Chet had saved up which was intended to buy uniforms for the team. In the end, Raymond realises what he did was wrong and returns the money to Chet.
19	19	"The Gumball Incident"	Jay Sandrich	Alan J. Levitt	February 1, 1970
Chet is wrongfully accused and arrested for breaking a gumball machine. Guest star: Tom Bosley as Cookie Maharg.
20	20	"Goodbye Cruel World"	Stanley Z. Cherry	Ed. Weinberger	February 8, 1970
Wally Cox guest stars in this episode as a shy man lacking in self confidence. With Chet's help, he builds up the nerve to ask a woman out on a date. She rejects him, and he wants to commit suicide. Chet helps to restore the man's confidence and self esteem.
21	21	"Driven to Distraction"	Coby Ruskin	Betty Bonaduce, Joseph Bonaduce	February 15, 1970
Drivers ed instructor Chet tries to teach a nervous student how to drive.
22	22	"The Blind Date"	Ralph Senensky	Warren S. Murray	March 1, 1970
Chet reluctantly agrees to go on a blind date, and ends up falling in love. Guest star: Cicely Tyson as Chet's love interest.
23	23	"How You Play the Game"	Coby Ruskin	Ed. Weinberger	March 8, 1970
Chet is in the running for the city handball championship. He defeats his semi final opponent, using psychological tactics. In the final match however, Chet has the tables turned on him and loses the match while being psyched out by his opponent. By losing, Chet teaches a player on the high school football team a lesson in good sportsmanship.
24	24	"The Return of Big, Bad, Bubba Bronson"	Bill Cosby	Rick Mittleman	March 22, 1970
Big Bronson, an old high school classmate of Chet's, is coming to town for a visit. Chet recalls having a past dispute with Bronson, and fears revenge. Chet meets ex prize fighter Hurricane Smith, and asks for some boxing lessons to prepare himself for Bronson's arrival. Guest Stars: Lou Gossett as Hurricane Smith, Don Pedro Colley as Big Bronson.
25	25	"This Mouth Is Rated X"	R. Robert Rosenbaum	Milton R.F. Brown (uncredited), Martin Ragaway, Ed. Weinberger	March 29, 1970
Chet is having problems with a player on the high school basketball team who uses profane language on the court during games.
26	26	"Really Cool"	Melvin Van Peebles	Bill Cosby, Milton R.F. Brown (uncredited), Ed. Weinberger	April 5, 1970
Chet is asked to tell a few stories about his life for a forthcoming article in the Holmes High School newspaper.

=== Season 2 (1970–71) ===
No. overall	No. in season	Title	Directed by	Written by	Original release date
27	1	"Anytime You're Ready, C.K."	Coby Ruskin	Ed. Weinberger	September 13, 1970
The Holmes High School football team is on a losing streak, so the team asks Chet if they can have game films to help determine what they're doing wrong. Chet borrows a movie camera from a friend, and films the team's practice sessions. Funny silent films result from Chet's experiments with trying out the camera. A side plot has Chet trying to help out a student and former player of the football team who can no longer play due to injury.
28	2	"Open House"	Jay Sandrich	Roland Wolpert	September 20, 1970
One of Chet's fellow teachers from the high school is a part time real estate agent. Chet spends a weekend helping him out, trying to sell a house. Chet sells the house, but the couple who put the house up for sale change their mind.
29	3	"Is There a Doctor in the Hospital?"	Coby Ruskin	Ed. Weinberger	September 27, 1970
Chet injures his back during his gym class, and needs to be taken to the hospital. Upon arrival, he has difficulty trying to obtain medical service, until a young patient staying at the hospital assists Chet and helps him find a doctor.
30	4	"There Must Be a Party"	Jay Sandrich	Gary Belkin	October 4, 1970
A female student at the high school is convinced she is destined to be an actress and is certain she will win an acting contest she has entered. Chet then tells her about the time he missed his own surprise birthday party to try to teach her a lesson about anticipation and being overconfident.
31	5	"The Old Man of 4-C"	Jay Sandrich	Ernest Kinoy	October 11, 1970
Will Geer guest stars in this episode as a lonesome elderly man looking for companionship. He befriends Chet, and becomes too demanding of Chet's time, but they end up compromising and spend some quality time together.
32	6	"The Lincoln Letter"	Sid McCoy	Martin Ragaway	October 18, 1970
Chet inherits a valuable letter which originally came from Abraham Lincoln. Only catch, the letter is misplaced and needs to be found.
33	7	"The Runaways"	Bill Cosby	Dorothy Cooper	October 25, 1970
Chet is sent out to track down and find a runaway boy. He succeeds, and they spend the day together. After sharing a few adventures, Chet helps the boy decide he should go back home.
34	8	"The Artist"	Ivan Dixon	Dorothy Cooper	November 1, 1970
Chet helps out a talented youngster who wants to become an artist. Chet disputes however, when the youngster chooses Chet as subject matter for his painting which will be on display at the art fair.
35	9	"March of the Antelopes"	Coby Ruskin	Michael Elias, Frank Shaw	November 8, 1970
Chet is in charge of a group of youngsters and is supposed to take them on an overnight camping trip. They set out to their destination, but mishaps occur, and they end up staying over at Chet's apartment.
36	10	"The Deluge: Part 1"	Coby Ruskin	Stanley R. Greenberg	November 15, 1970
A driving rainstorm is pounding the Los Angeles area. Chet's next door neighbor is due to have her baby and is unable to get to the hospital, streets are flooded. Chet helps out as the woman prepares to have her baby at home. Part one of a two part episode.
37	11	"The Deluge: Part 2"	Coby Ruskin	Stanley R. Greenberg	November 22, 1970
Conclusion of a two part episode. Chet helps an expectant mother deliver her baby at home during a driving rainstorm.
38	12	"Swann's Way"	Jay Sandrich	Ed. Weinberger	December 13, 1970
Don Knotts guest stars in this episode as a shifty repossessor who's trying to repossess Chet's television set.
39	13	"The Poet"	Ivan Dixon	Art Wallace	December 20, 1970
A male student at the high school enjoys writing poetry, but doesn't want his friends to find out, fearing ridicule. Chet (who has also written some poetry) tells the student he shouldn't be concerned with what other people think, to go ahead and do what he enjoys doing. Chet then gets in a bind when he is mistaken as the author of a poem he copied in his youth, and the poem is scheduled to be published in the school newspaper.
40	14	"Teacher of the Year"	Coby Ruskin	Martin Ragaway	December 27, 1970
Upon winning the award for Teacher of the Year, Chet has a difficult time convincing the other teachers to attend the banquet where he will receive the award.
41	15	"Each According to His Appetite"	Jay Sandrich	Robert Garland	January 3, 1971
Students at the high school organize a lockout of the teachers cafeteria, requesting that they have input over what foods go on the student menu. Chet helps the students and cafeteria manager reach a compromise. But when the same students have a grievance with Chet's gym class, Chet is not as willing to cooperate.
42	16	"Viva Ortega"	Luther James	Sandy Baron, Treva Silverman, Oliver Wolcott	January 10, 1971
Chet tutors a Mexican immigrant who is studying to become a United States citizen.
43	17	"Miraculous Martin"	Coby Ruskin	Robert Garland	January 17, 1971
Dick Van Dyke guest stars in this episode as Miraculous Martin, an out of work magician who's trying to stay sober and planning to get married.
44	18	"The Sesame Street Rumble"	Bill Cosby	Ed. Weinberger	January 24, 1971
Chet has a large television antenna installed so he can watch the big Rams/Packers football game. Many teachers from the high school come over to see the game, but Chet's television set goes out. Chet goes to his sister's and brother in law's place to try to borrow their television set, but Chet's little nephew Davey refuses to let him borrow it, insisting that he wants to watch Sesame Street. Bill Russell guest stars as one of the teachers.
45	19	"The Generation Gap"	Jay Sandrich	Art Wallace	January 31, 1971
Chet's mother is going out of town, so Chet's father comes to stay with him while she is away. As they spend time together, they discover that things have changed and they don't have as much in common anymore. Acting appearance by Kathy McKee
46	20	"Tobacco Road"	Coby Ruskin	Ed. Weinberger	February 7, 1971
Chet aids a fellow teacher from the high school who's trying to quit smoking. Herb Edelman guest stars as Mr. Maher, the teacher who's trying to kick the habit.
47	21	"A Dirty Business"	Coby Ruskin	John D.F. Black	February 14, 1971
Chet is at odds with a student at the high school who wants to be a spy. Because the student is a fast runner, Chet wants him to join up with the school's track team. But the student wants no part of it, preferring to remain out of the spotlight.
48	22	"The Barber Shop"	Coby Ruskin	Michael Elias, Frank Shaw	February 21, 1971
Chet visits the local barber shop for a haircut. While there, he gets involved in a dispute with the barber and another patron over baseball. The three of them end up going to a high rise hotel, where the barber claims he can catch a baseball dropped from a window of the hotel's top floor. Guest Star: Antonio Fargas as J.J. the barber, Isabel Sanford and Arthur French.
49	23	"The Power of a Tree"	Ivan Dixon	Michael Elias, Frank Shaw	February 28, 1971
Elsa Lanchester guest stars as an eccentric woman who recruits Chet to help save a tree from being cut down at a construction site.
50	24	"The Green-Eyed Monster"	Coby Ruskin	Michael Elias, Frank Shaw	March 7, 1971
A male student from the high school seeks Chet's advice regarding love and jealousy. As it turns out, Chet could use a lesson or two himself and does not seem to practice what he preaches. Kim Weston guest stars, and cast includes DeWayne Jessie (Otis Day).
51	25	"The Long Road Back"	Coby Ruskin	Art Wallace	March 14, 1971
John Marley guest stars in this episode as a wealthy, eccentric man who wants to relive his childhood. He seeks Chet's help to have his wish come true.
52	26	"The Saturday Game"	Allan Sherman	Art Wallace	March 21, 1971
In the series finale, a young Jewish boy joins Chet's little league baseball team. Saturday is the day of the big game, and the boy is forced to decide between playing in the game, or sitting out due to his religious beliefs, Saturday being the Jewish sabbath.

== Syndication ==
In September 1984, Cosby returned to NBC, with a similarly named sitcom titled The Cosby Show. The popularity of that sitcom led to reruns of this one being picked up on the CBN Cable Network.

In 2013, reruns of this series began being broadcast on the ASPIRE Television Network and Soul of the South Network. In July 2015, both networks ceased airing the series following allegations of sexual assaults made against Cosby.

== Home media ==
Shout! Factory has released both seasons of The Bill Cosby Show on DVD in Region 1.

Mill Creek Entertainment released a ten episode best of set entitled The Bill Cosby Show – The Best of Season 1 on March 22, 2011.
