= Dramatic Overture (Fernández Blanco) =

1940 tone poem by Evaristo Fernández Blanco

The Dramatic Overture by Evaristo Fernández Blanco is a tone poem written in 1940.

Subtitled Musical setting for a civic social war drama, it was conceived as a homage to the Republican effort in the Spanish Civil War after the war ended with the victory of the National faction and the establishment of a repressive dictatorship, and marked the composer's creative retirement for four decades. It was written in Viascón, a hamlet in Pontevedra where Fernández Blanco, a Republican cultural officer during the war, hid from reprisals. The work consists of three episodes titled Desolation, Action and Hommage to the heroes, respectively a gloomy introduction, a frantic ostinato march and a glorifying hymn including quotations from The Internationale and Whirlwinds of Danger.

The work was unperformable in Francoist Spain for political reasons, and it was only after General Franco died and the Spanish transition to democracy was carried out that it was premiered on 26 February 1983 by the RTVE Symphony under Enrique García Asensio's baton.

== Recordings ==
- Málaga Philharmonic – José Luis Temes. Verso Records, 2008.
