= Xochipilli (Chávez) =

1940 Aztec-inspired chamber work by Carlos Chávez

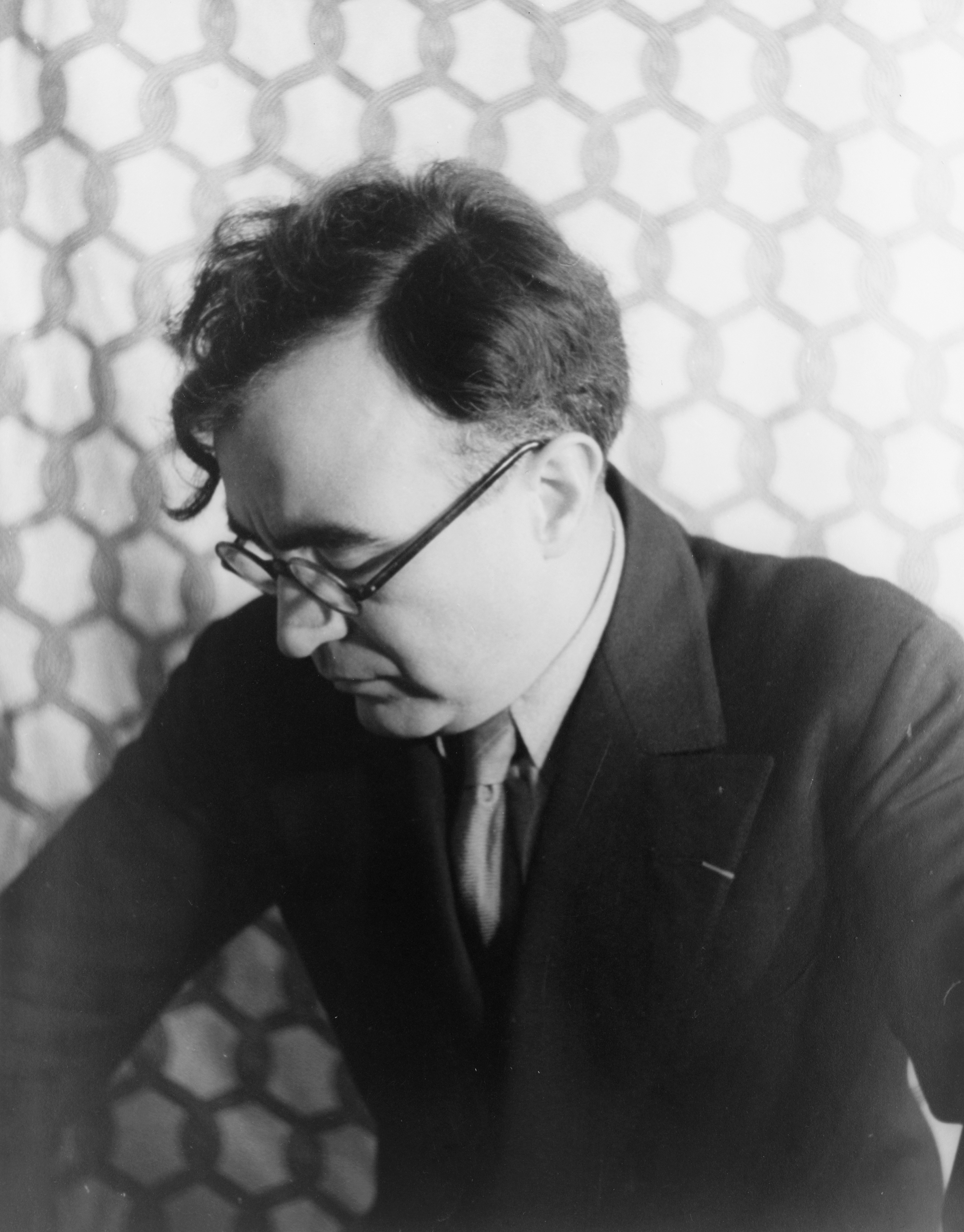
Chávez in 1937

Xochipilli, subtitled "An Imagined Aztec Music", is a short composition for four wind instruments and six percussionists by the Mexican composer Carlos Chávez, written in 1940. Its original title was Xochipilli-Macuilxóchitl, which is the double name of an Aztec god in two of his aspects, meaning "Flower Prince" and "Five Flower".

== History ==
In connection with an exhibition titled Twenty Centuries of Mexican Art, held in May 1940 at the Museum of Modern Art in New York City, the president of MoMA, Nelson Rockefeller, commissioned Chávez to assemble a programme of music for daily presentation, under the title Panorama of Mexican Music. In addition to arrangements of popular Mexican music from the recent past, Chávez composed Xochipilli-Macuilxóchitl to showcase pre-Columbian Aztec instruments. This score was completed on 12 May 1940. Chávez conducted the premiere at the opening performance of the Museum of Modern Art exhibit four days later, on 16 May 1940.

In 1964 Chávez revised the score for publication. At this time he shortened the title to Xochipilli, and added the (English) subtitle, "An Imagined Aztec Music".

== Instrumentation ==
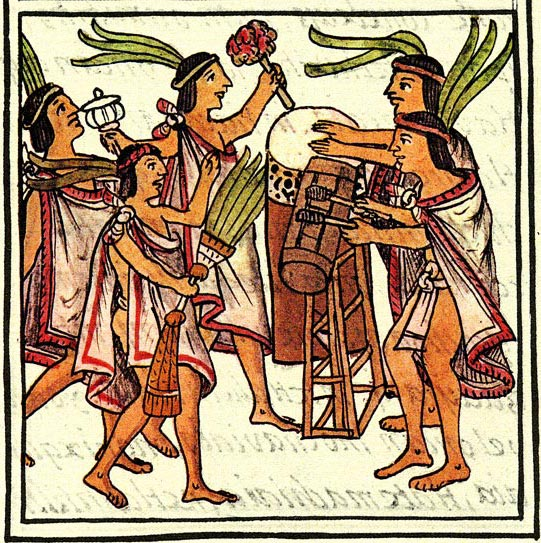
Aztec teponaztli (foreground) and huéhuetl (background)

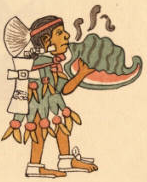
Aztec conch-shell trumpet

Xochipilli is scored for ten players: piccolo, flute, E♭ clarinet, trombone, and six percussionists playing a variety of instruments, many of Aztec origin: teponaztli, huéhuetl, omichicahuaztli. The piccolo and flute deputize for Aztec flutes of bone or clay, the E♭ clarinet represents the clay ocarina, and the trombone is used as a substitute for the Aztec conch-shell trumpet.

== Programme ==
In Aztec mythology, Xochipilli is the god associated with flowers, music, and dance, as is also Macuilxóchitl. "Their difference is esoteric. Macuilxochitl is the imperceptible god, an entity beyond the scope of human thought, a timeless being dwelling in the cosmos. Xochipilli is the embodiment of the same spirit on Earth, perceived in the visible, tangible, and edible world".

== Analysis ==
Xochipilli falls into three main sections, b. 1–83, 84–134, and 135–269, in an ABA' pattern. The two outer sections are in fast tempos (Allegro animato, = 100, and Vivo, = 104), surrounding a slow central section (Lento, = 58). Each of these parts is in turn subdivided into three subsections.

== Discography ==
- A Program of Mexican Music: Sponsored by the Museum of Modern Art. Blas Galindo (arr.), Sones de Mariachi; Carlos Chávez (arr.): La paloma azul; Carlos Chávez, Xochipili-Macuilxochitl and "Danza a Centeotl" (from Los cuatro soles); Luis Sandí (arr.), Yaqui music; Gerónimo Baqueiro Fóster (arr.), Huapango. Carlos Chávez conducting an orchestra of American and Mexican musicians and the chorus of the National Music League. Four-disc set, 78 rpm, 12 in. Columbia M-414 (set): 70332-D, 70333-D, 70334-D, 70335-D. New York: Columbia, 1940.
- Mexico: Its Cultural Life in Music and Art / Su Vida Cultural en la Música y el Arte. Carlos Chávez: "Danza a Centeotl" from Los cuatro soles; Xochipilli; Luis Sandi (arr.), El venado; Carlos Chávez (arr.), La paloma azul; Blas Galindo (arr.), Sones de mariachi; Gerónimo Baqueiro Fóster (arr.), La bamba. Mexican Orchestra and Chorus; Carlos Chávez, cond. LP recording, 1 disc, 12 in., 33⅓ in. New York: Columbia Records, 1964.
- Carlos Chávez: Chamber Works. Xochipilli: An Imagined Aztec Music; Suite for Double Quartet, from The Daughter of Colchis; Tambuco; Energía; Toccata for Percussion Instruments. La Camerata; Tambuco; Eduardo Mata (cond.). CD recording, 1 disc: stereo, 12 cm. Dorian DOR-90215. Troy, NY: Dorian Records, 1994.
- Carlos Chávez: Complete Chamber Music, Vol. 3. Xochipilli, an Imaginary Aztec Music; Toccata for percussion; Cuatro melodías tradicionales; Tambuco for percussion; Lamentaciónes; Cantos de México; Antígona, apuntes para la sinfonía; Tres Exágonos. Otros Tres Exágonos; Partita for solo timpani. Southwest Chamber Music. CD recording, 1 disc: stereo, 12 cm. Cambria CD 8853. Lomita, CA: Cambria Master Recordings, 2005.
