= Rex Ingram (actor) =

American actor (1895–1969)

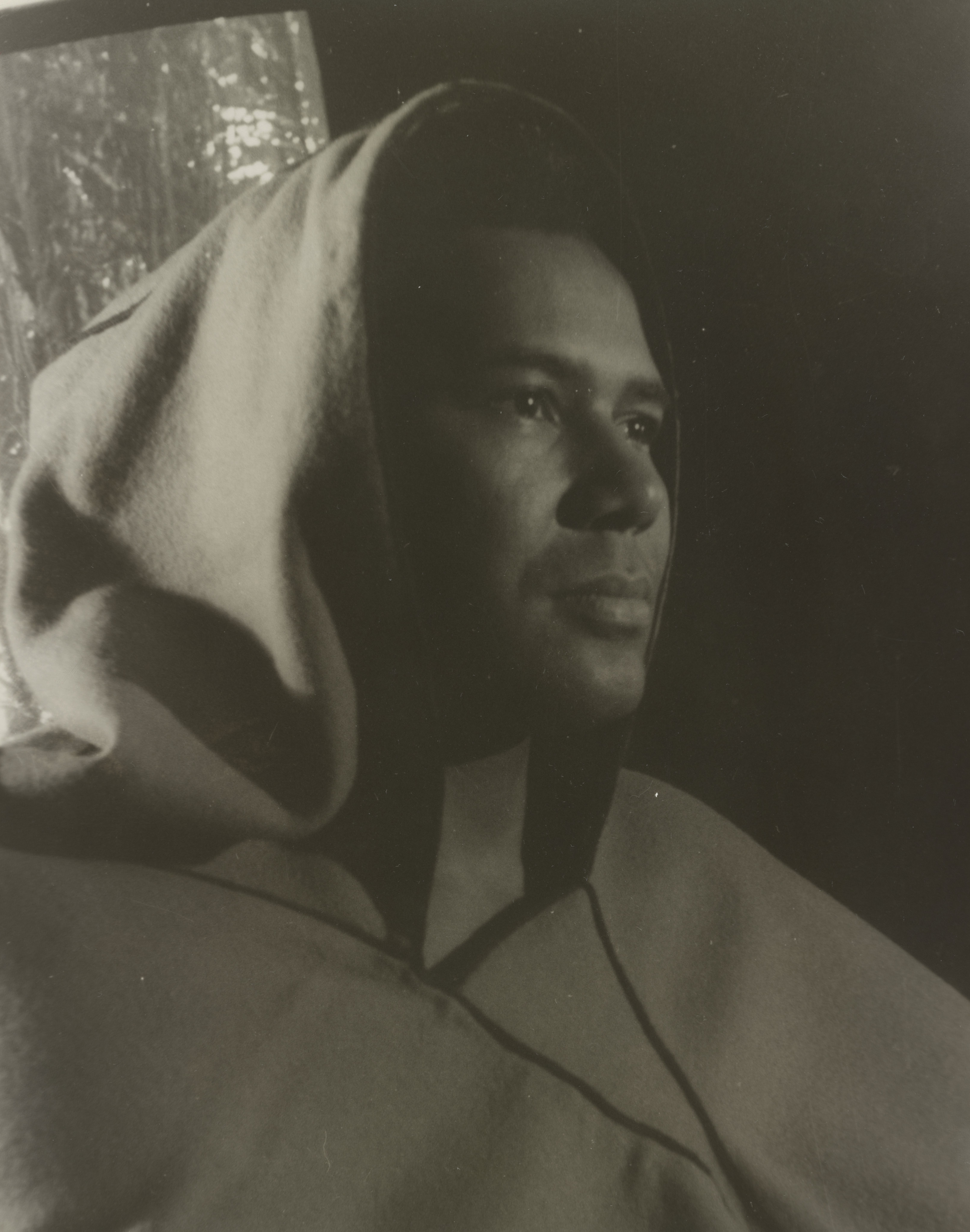
- Portrait by Carl Van Vechten, 1934
- Born: October 20, 1895; Cairo, Illinois, U.S.
- Died: September 19, 1969 (aged 73); Los Angeles, California, U.S.
- Occupation: Actor
- Years active: 1918–1969
- Spouses: Francine Everett (m. 1936; div. 1939) Lauwaune Kennard (m. 1941, divorced): Dena Guillory (m. 19??)

Rex Ingram (October 20, 1895 – September 19, 1969) was an American stage, film, and television actor.

== Early life ==
Ingram was born near Cairo, Illinois, on the Mississippi River; his father was a steamer fireman on the riverboat Robert E. Lee. Ingram graduated from the Northwestern University medical school in 1919 and was the first African-American man to receive a Phi Beta Kappa key from Northwestern University.

== Career ==
Ingram went to Hollywood as a young man where he was literally discovered on a street corner by the casting director for Tarzan of the Apes (1918), starring Elmo Lincoln. He made his (uncredited) screen debut in that film and had many other small roles, usually as a generic black native, such as in the Tarzan films.

With the arrival of sound, his presence and his powerful voice became assets, and he went on to memorable roles in The Green Pastures (1936), The Adventures of Huckleberry Finn (the 1939 MGM version, opposite Mickey Rooney), The Thief of Bagdad (1940—perhaps his best-known film appearance—as the genie), The Talk of the Town (1942), and Sahara (1943).

From 1929, he also appeared on stage, making his debut on Broadway. He appeared in more than a dozen Broadway productions, with his final role coming in Kwamina in 1961. He was in the original casts of Haiti (1938), Cabin in the Sky (1940), and St. Louis Woman (1946). He is one of the few actors to have played both God (in The Green Pastures) and the Devil (in Cabin in the Sky). In 1966 he played Tee-Tot in the movie Your Cheatin' Heart.

Ingram was arrested for violating the Mann Act in 1948. After pleading guilty to the charge of transporting a teenage girl to New York for immoral purposes, he was sentenced to eighteen months in jail. He served just ten months of his sentence, but the incident had a serious effect on his career for the next six years. In the interim, he invested in the Club Alabam, a nightclub in the Dunbar Hotel in South Central Los Angeles, with partners Joe Morris and Clarence Moore, reopening it as a jazz club.

In 1962, he became the first African-American actor to be hired for a contract role on a soap opera when he appeared on The Brighter Day. He had other minor work in television in the 1960s, appearing in one episode each of I Spy and The Bill Cosby Show, both of which starred Bill Cosby, who used his influence to land him the roles.

== Death ==
Two weeks after filming a guest spot on The Bill Cosby Show on September 5, 1969, Ingram died of a heart attack at the age of 73.

== Complete filmography ==
Year	Film	Role	Notes
1918	Tarzan of the Apes		Uncredited
1918	Salomé		Uncredited
1923	The Ten Commandments	Israelite Slave	Uncredited
1927	The King of Kings	Minor Role	Uncredited
1929	The Four Feathers	Fuzzy Wuzzy Native	Uncredited
1933	The Emperor Jones	Court Crier	Uncredited
1934	Harlem After Midnight		
1936	The Green Pastures	Adam / De Lawd / Hezdrel	
1939	The Adventures of Huckleberry Finn	Jim	
1940	The Thief of Bagdad	Djinn	
1941	Hoola Boola	Narrator	Short
1941	The Gay Knighties	Narrator	Short
1942	Jasper and the Watermelons		Voice, Short
1942	The Talk of the Town	Tilney	
1943	Cabin in the Sky	Lucifer Jr. / Lucius Ferry	
1943	Sahara	Sgt. Major Tambul	
1943	Fired Wife	Charles	
1944	Jasper's Paradise		Voice, Short
1944	Dark Waters	Pearson Jackson	
1945	Hot Lips Jasper		Voice, Short
1945	Jasper Tell		Voice, Short
1945	A Thousand and One Nights	Giant	
1945	Adventure	Preacher	
1946	John Henry and the Inky-Poo	John Henry / Narration	Voice, Short
1947	Shoe Shine Jasper		Voice, Short
1948	Moonrise	Mose	
1955	Tarzan's Hidden Jungle	Sukulu Chieftain	Uncredited
1956	Congo Crossing	Dr. Leopold Gorman	
1957	Hell on Devil's Island	Lulu	
1958	God's Little Acre	Uncle Felix	
1958	Anna Lucasta	Joseph Lucasta	
1959	Escort West	Nelson Water	
1959	Watusi	Umbopa	Alternative title: The Quest for King Solomon's Mines
1960	Elmer Gantry	Preacher	Uncredited
1960	Desire in the Dust	Burt Crane	
1964	Your Cheatin' Heart	Tee-Tot	
1967	Hurry Sundown	Professor Thurlow	
1968	Journey to Shiloh	Jacob	

== Partial television credits ==
Year	Series	Role	Notes
1956	Climax!	Petraca	1 episode
1958	Whirlybirds	Joe	1 episode
1959	Black Saddle	Alex Booth	1 episode
1961	The Rifleman	Thaddeus	1 episode
1962	Sam Benedict	Judge Larkin	1 episode
1965	I Spy	Dr. Bingham	1 episode
1966	Branded	Hannibal	1 episode
1967–1968	Daktari	Natoma; Chief Makuba	2 episodes
1968	Cowboy in Africa	Dr. Tom Merar	1 episode
1969	Gunsmoke	Juba	1 episode
1969	The Bill Cosby Show	George	Episode: A Christmas Ballad; posthumous release (final television appearance)
