= Juraj Beneš =

Slovak composer and pianist

Juraj Beneš (2 March 1940 in Trnava, Slovak State – 10 September 2004 in Bratislava, Slovakia) was a Slovak composer, teacher, and pianist.

== Career ==
He graduated from the university called Academy of Performing Arts in Bratislava (VŠMU) and was a pupil of Ján Cikker, who was one of the best known Slovak composers. Since 1983 Beneš taught at the same university.

Beneš's work followed current trends and spanned genres. He was best in composing operas such as Cisárove nové šaty (The Emperor's New Clothes), Skamenený (Petrified), and Hostina (Feast) and often employed the human voice together with unusual instrument combinations as in Tri ženské zbory (Three Women's Choir).
