= Evaristo Fernández Blanco =

Spanish composer (1902–1993)

Evaristo Fernández Blanco (Astorga, 6 March 1902 – Madrid, 22 October 1993) was a Spanish composer. He was a member of the Generation of '27, associated to the Group of Eight.

Fernández Blanco studied in Madrid under Conrado del Campo and in Vienna under Franz Schreker. Returning to Madrid in 1935, he aligned with the Republican faction and was named a representative of the government's Music Council. After the Republican defeat in 1939 he sought refuge from the White Terror in Viascón, a hamlet in Pontevedra where he composed his Dramatic Overture. In 1941 he moved to Barcelona, where he worked as a pianist in local zarzuela companies. Soon he stopped composing.

With the transition to democracy in the second half of the 1970s there was some interest in Fernández Blanco's music. In 1982 he composed his Suite of Old Dances on a commission for the RTVE Symphony Orchestra, marking his return to composition after four decades of silence.

In 2008 his complete orchestral works were recorded by the Málaga Philharmonic conducted by José Luis Temes and released by Verso Records.

== Selected works ==
=== Orchestral ===
- Sad Valse
- Mountain Impressions (1921)
- Symphonic Overture (1925)
- Exaltation, tone poem
- Two Leonese Dances (1932)
- Dramatic Overture (1940)
- Suite of Old Dances (1982)

=== Instrumental ===
- Piano Trio in C (1928)
- Perpetuum Mobile for piano
