= Ted Fetter =

American songwriter

Theodore Fetter (June 10, 1906 – March 13, 1996) was a Broadway lyricist who contributed material to such revues as The Show Is On (1936) and Billy Rose's Aquacade (1939), but is best remembered for co-writing the song "Taking a Chance on Love," introduced in the 1940 musical comedy Cabin in the Sky.

== Biography ==
Fetter started as an actor, appearing in the 1928 revival of Peter Pan and in Cole Porter's 1935 musical comedy, Jubilee. Fetter was Porter's second cousin and later wrote additional lyrics for some of Porter's songs. Beginning in 1936, he wrote lyrics for a number of revues, melodramas and burlesques in collaboration with composers, Richard Lewine, Hoagy Carmichael and Vernon Duke. In 1940, Duke was working on Cabin in the Sky with lyricist John Latouche and needed a new number for star Ethel Waters. He pulled out an old "trunk song" that he had written years earlier with Fetter, called "Fooling Around With Love". With Fetter's permission, Latouche revised the lyric as "Taking a Chance on Love" and the song was added to the show three days before the opening. According to Duke's autobiography, Passport to Paris, "If ever a song stopped the show, but cold, it was 'Taking a Chance on Love.'"

Fetter entered the television industry in the early 1950s as a television producer for Your Hit Parade and later worked for Jack Paar. In 1956 he moved to ABC, where he worked as national director of programs until 1968, after which he became an independent producer. From 1974 to 1979 he served as the curator of the Theater and Music Collection at the Museum of the City of New York.

Copies of the songs and shows Fetter wrote with Richard Lewine are available for research in the Billy Rose Collection of the New York Public Library.

Fetter died, aged 89, New York Hospital-Cornell Medical Center in Manhattan.

== Selected list of works ==
- 1936 "Now" (music by Vernon Duke); from The Show Is On
- 1937 Naughty Naught '00 (music by Richard Lewine)
- 1937 The Fireman's Flame (music by Richard Lewine)
- 1938 The Girl from Wyoming (music by Richard Lewine)
- 1939 Billy Rose's Aquacade (music by Dana Suesse)
- 1939 "After Tonight" (music by Glenn Miller)
