= Piano Concerto (Chávez) =

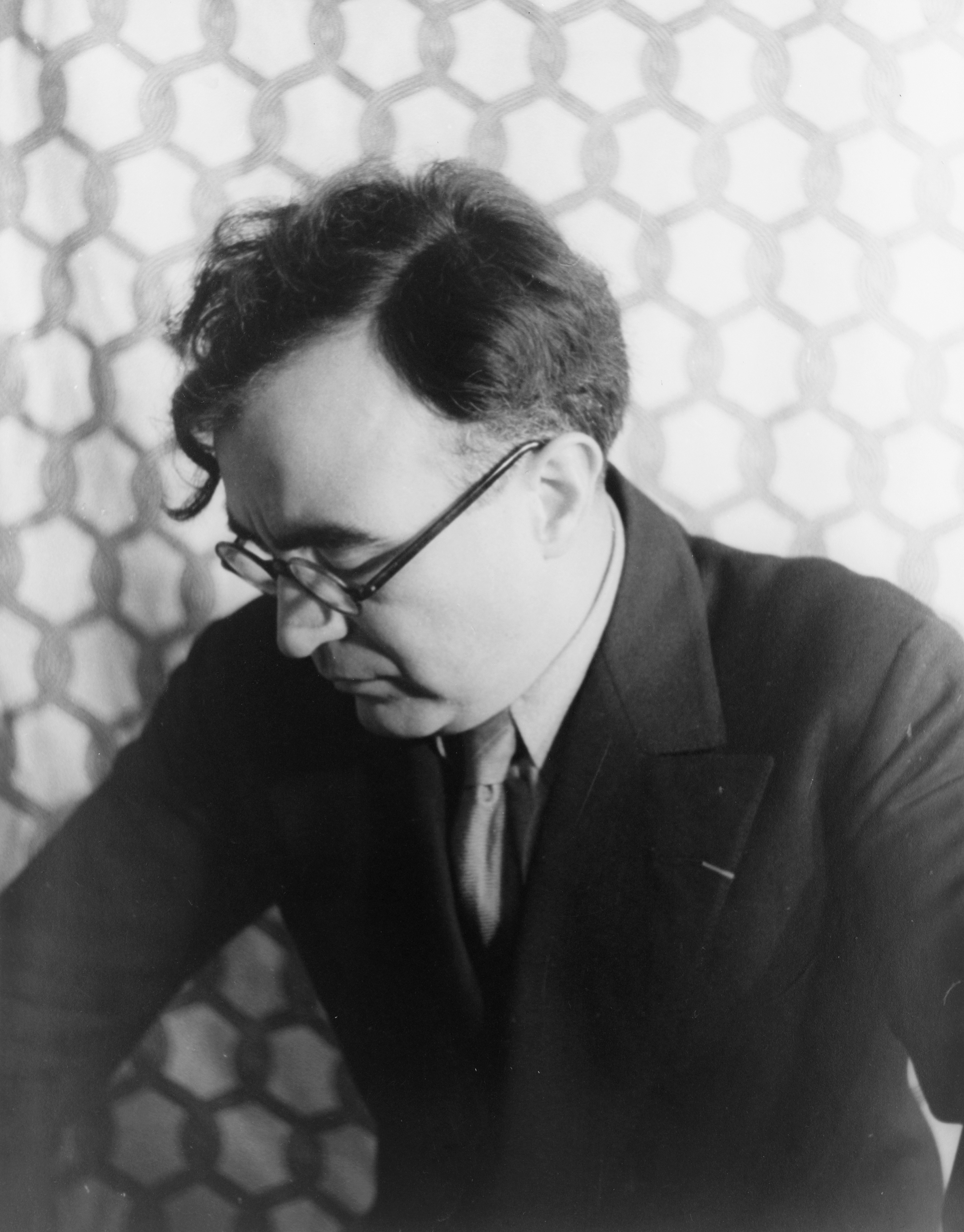
Carlos Chávez in 1937

Concerto for Piano with Orchestra is a piano concerto by the Mexican composer Carlos Chávez, written between 1938 and 1940.

== History ==
Early in 1938 Chávez received a grant from the John Simon Guggenheim Memorial Foundation, which provided support for the composition of a Piano Concerto. He set to work in the spring of 1938, finishing the short score by the end of the year. Resumption of work on the orchestration, however, was only possible in October 1940, and Chávez put the final touches on the score on 31 December of that year. The concerto was premiered by Eugene List with the New York Philharmonic Orchestra under the direction of Dimitri Mitropoulos on 1 January 1942. The European premiere was given by Tom Bromley and the BBC Symphony Orchestra conducted by Sir Adrian Boult on 6 September of the same year. The Mexican premiere did not take place until 13 August 1943, with Claudio Arrau and the Orquesta Sinfónica de México conducted by Chávez himself.

Chávez revised the score in 1969.

== Instrumentation ==
The concerto is scored for solo piano and an orchestra consisting of:

Woodwinds

piccolo
2 flutes
2 oboes
cor anglais
2 clarinets
2 bassoons
contrabassoon

Brass

4 horns
2 trumpets
bass trombone
tuba

Percussion

timpani

three percussionists
1. glockenspiel, side drum, suspended cymbal, woodblock
2. tenor drum, crash cymbals, maracas, claves
3. xylophone, tambourine, bass drum, large gong

Keyboards

celesta

Strings

harp

violins I
violins II
violas
cellos
double basses

== Analysis ==
The concerto has three movements, played without any breaks:

1. Largo non troppo – Allegro agitato – Largo non troppo
2. Molto lento – Poco meno lento – Andante tranquillo
3. Finale: Allegro non troppo

The first movement represents two-thirds of the entire concerto, and is in a modified sonata-allegro form with a thirty-bar introduction and a cadenza linking the end of the recapitulation to the coda. The movement is modal, predominantly in E Phrygian with excursions to F and G, eventually returning to E Phrygian but with a final cadence on the subdominant, A.

The second, slow movement has two main parts, which are preceded by an introduction and concluded with a canonic coda. Harmonically the movement is dominated by quartal harmonies, anchored over pedals of A (bridging from the first movement), D (beginning with and continuing through most of the second section), and G from b. 1221 to the end of the movement. Motivic material is closely related to that of the first movement.

The finale is characterized by rhythmic drive and intensity, using interrupting rests and short motives to create a sense of instability and tension. It falls into three sections with a coda. The first two parts present distinct thematic material, while the third part combines the substance of the first two parts while adding new material of its own. Harmonically, the movement is largely polymodal, moving in the concluding section to F♯ major.

== Discography ==
- Eugene List, piano; Vienna State Opera Orchestra, Carlos Chávez, cond. 1 sound disc: 33⅓ rpm. monaural, 12 in. Westminster WST 17030. New York: Westminster Records, 1963 (reissued on LP, Westminster Gold, stereo, WGS-8324. New York: ABC 1976). Reissued as part of Carlos Chávez: The Composer Conducts. CD recording, 2 discs: digital, stereo., monaural, 4¾ in. [Germany]: MCA Millennium Classics, 1996.
- María Teresa Rodríguez, piano; New Philharmonia Orchestra, Eduardo Mata, cond. Recorded 1978. LP recording 1 sound disc: 33⅓ rpm, stereo, 12 in. RCA Red Seal ARL1-3341. New York: RCA, 1979.
- Jorge Federico Osorio, piano; Mexico National Symphony Orchestra, Carlos Miguel Prieto, cond., recorded Sala Nezahualcóyotl, Centro Cultural Universitario UNAM, México, D.F. 7–9 March 2011. CD recording. 1 disc: 4¾ in., stereo. Chicago: Cedille Records, 2013.
- Carlos Chávez: Dos conciertos. Jorge Federico Osorio, piano; Pablo Roberto Diemecke, violin; Orquesta Sinfónica Nacional de México, Enrique Arturo Diemecke, conductor. CD recording, 1 disc, 4¾ in., stereo. Spartacus SDX27299. Clásicos Mexicanos. Mexico: Spartacus, 2001.
