= Henry Katzman =

American musician and painter

Henry Manners Katzman
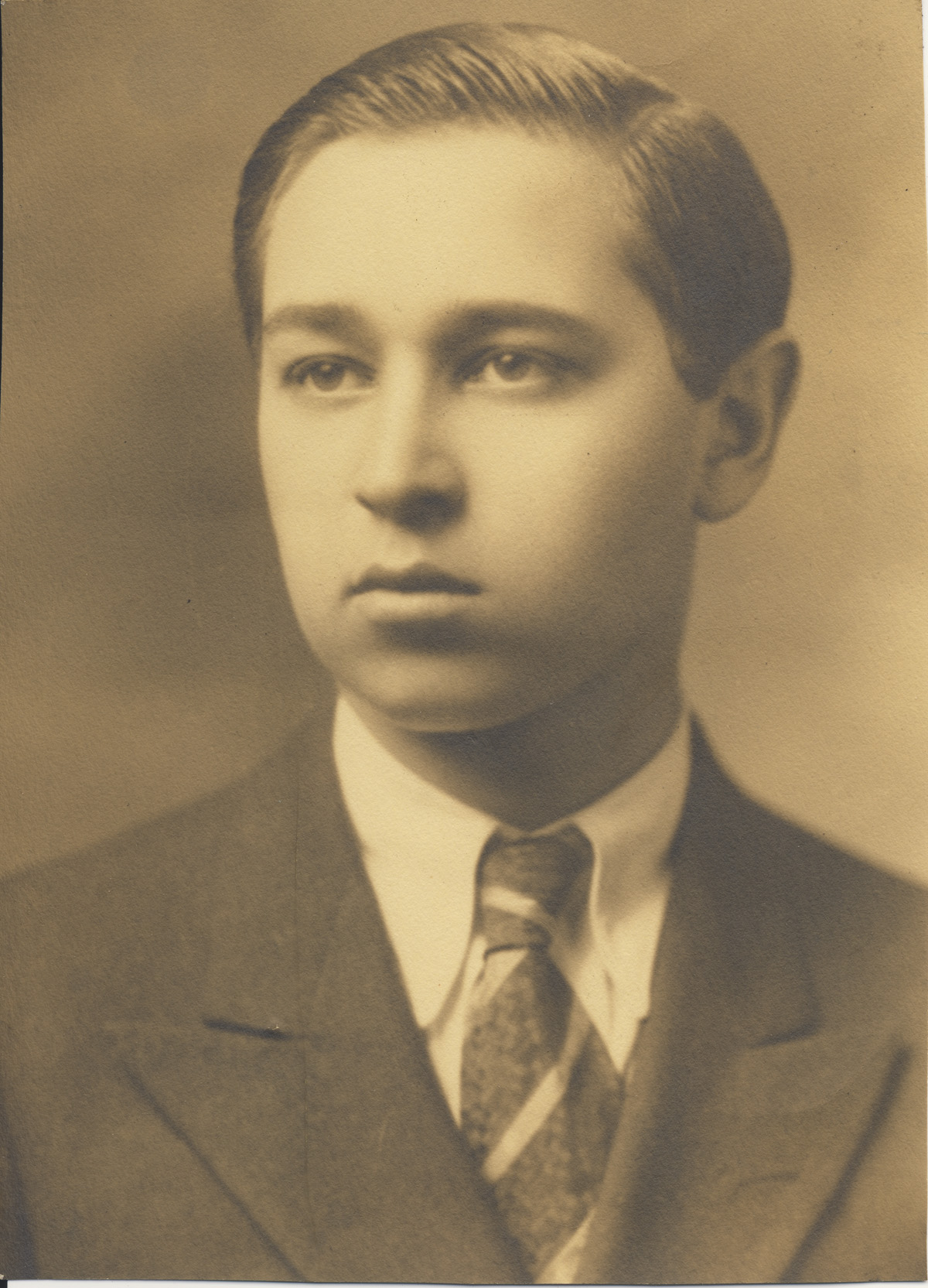
- Henry Katzman in his 20s

Background information
- Also known as: Henry Manners
- Born: Henry Katzman; March 2, 1912
- Died: May 11, 2001 (aged 89)
- Occupations: Composer, painter, musician

Henry Manners Katzman (March 2, 1912 – May 11, 2001) was an American musician, composer, painter, and one of the founders of Broadcast Music Incorporated (BMI).

The son of bandleader Louis Katzman, he grew up in New York City in a musical household and quickly took to the piano as his instrument of choice. He was one of the founders of BMI, which was established as an alternative to ASCAP, the leading music publisher of the day. ASCAP had focused solely on big band music and refused to publish works in such categories as blues, country, jazz, and folk. BMI's creation allowed for the expansion of American music, and helped pave the way for the eventual rise of rock, soul, and country music.

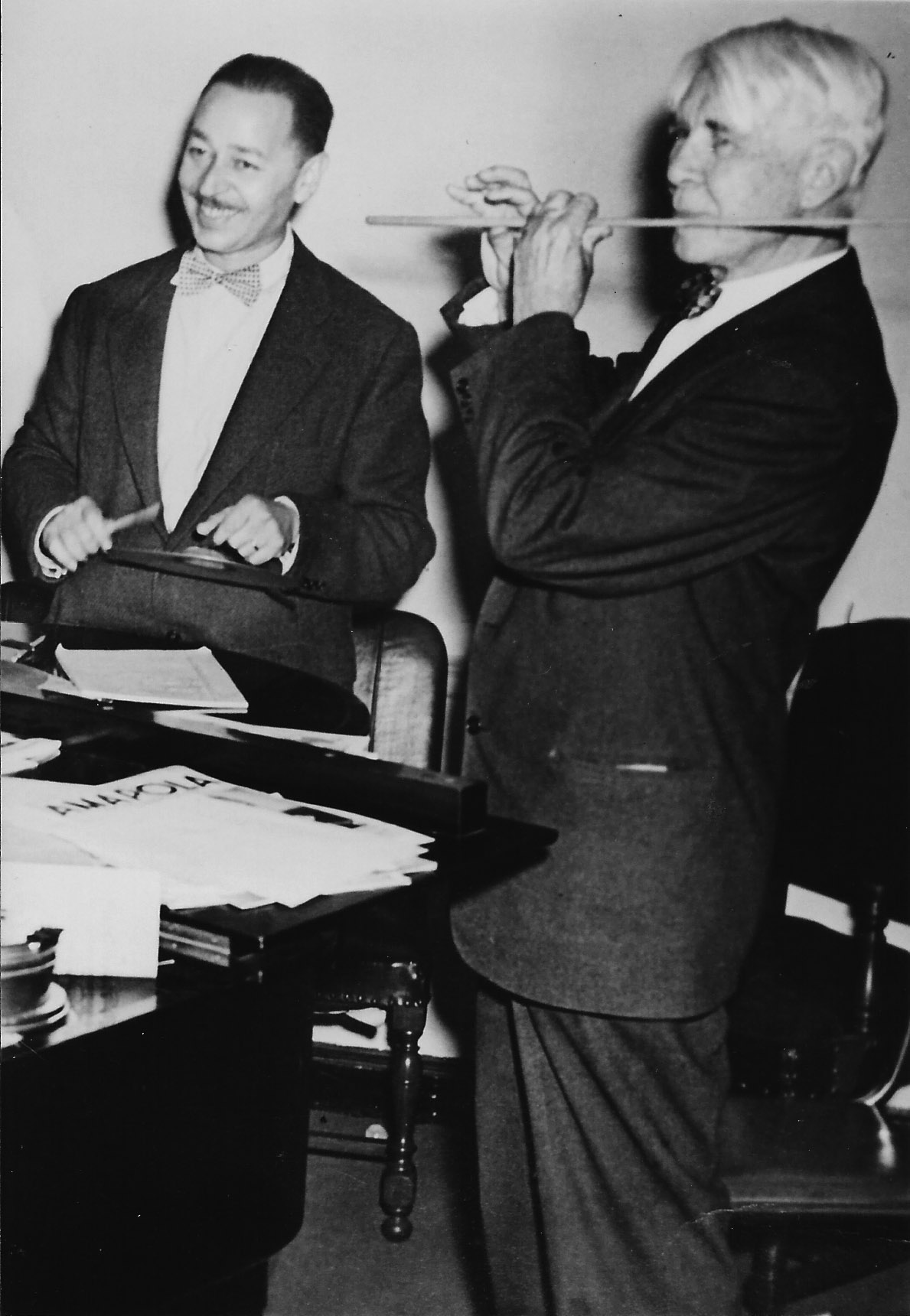
Henry Katzman and Carl Sandberg, September 1953.

In March 1940, BMI issued their very first contract, which was for "We Could Make Such Beautiful Music Together", with music composed by Katzman and lyrics by Robert Sour. Although this was the first song published by BMI, it has been frequently covered by a wide variety of artists, including vintage recordings by Barbara Lea, Judy Garland, and Liza Minnelli, and more recent recordings by Phil Woods and Bebo Valdés. Katzman composed over 65 other popular works, including "Delilah", "Starlight Sonata" (famously covered by a young Frank Sinatra), "Keep An Eye On Your Heart", "Mabel Mabel" (covered by Nat King Cole), and "Braggin'" (covered by Bob Dylan). He also composed soundtrack music, including "Thumper Song" and "Twitterpated" for the original Bambi animated film.

As a pianist, he played with George Gershwin and accompanied Irène Bordoni, Fred Allen, and Jan Peerce. He also volunteered with the Veterans Bedside Network, and was a long-time member of the Radio Pioneers.
