= Cabin in the Sky (musical) =

1940 musical

- Music: Vernon Duke
- Lyrics: John Latouche
- Book: Lynn Root
- Productions: 1940 Martin Beck Theatre

Cabin in the Sky is a musical with music by Vernon Duke, book by Lynn Root, and lyrics by John Latouche. The musical opened on Broadway in 1940. The show is described as a "parable of Southern Negro Life with echoes of Ferenc Molnár's Liliom (which would be turned into the musical Carousel) and Marc Connelly's The Green Pastures." Several songs from the Broadway musical were released as a 3-record shellac set under the title "The Music of Cabin in the Sky featuring Ethel Waters" in 1940.

== History ==
Lynn Root wrote the libretto and brought it to George Balanchine, "who was anxious to do it as his first assignment as director of an entire Broadway production." Balanchine took the script to Vernon Duke to compose the music. "On reading the script, my first impulse was to turn it down because as much as I admired the Negro race and its musical gifts, I didn't think myself sufficiently attuned to Negro folklore." However, Duke ended up taking up the project but insisted on "a lyricist with some direct contact with Southern Negroes." Duke talked to Ira Gershwin and E.Y. Harburg but they turned it down. (Gershwin was working on Lady in the Dark and Harburg thought the composer was "incapable of writing the kind of score the play required.)

Duke ended up picking John Latouche as his lyricist and the two began work in Virginia Beach. The two wanted to absorb aspects of the local black culture but "decided to stay away from pedantic authenticity and write our own kind of 'colored' songs."

The rehearsals for the show were rather interesting between the Russian trio (Duke, Balanchine and Boris Aronson - the designer) and the all-black cast. In his book Passport to Paris, Duke quotes George Ross' description from the Telegram: "Pit a threesome of turbulent Russians against a tempestuous cast of Negro players from Harlem and what have you got? Well, in this instance the result is a lingual ruckus approaching bedlam. At least half a dozen times at the rehearsal of Cabin in the Sky, Ethel Waters, Todd Duncan, Rex Ingram, J. Rosamond Johnson, Katherine Dunham and her dancers have paused in puzzlement while the argumentative trio of Muscovites disputed a difference of opinion in their native tongue. The Russian vowels and consonants fly as thick as borsht. After ten minutes of such alien harangue and retort, Miss Waters asks what it is all about. ‘George,’ Duke generally interprets, ‘just said the answer is yes!' and then rehearsals are resumed under the flag of truce until the next vocal flare-up."

Three days before the opening, Duke decided to replace the song "We'll Live All Over Again" after Waters expressed dissatisfaction with it. It was replaced with the showstopper "Taking a Chance on Love." The song was originally "Foolin' Around with Love" which he wrote with Ted Fetter. Latouche retitled it and wrote the reprises.

J. Rosamond Johnson, besides taking a small role, trained the singing chorus. Katherine Dunham led her dancers through their slithering paces, assisted in the choreography by George Balanchine.

== Productions ==
The musical premiered on Broadway at the Martin Beck Theatre on October 25, 1940 and closed on March 8, 1941 after 156 performances. The musical is based on the story Little Joe by Lynn Root.

Musicals Tonight! presented a staged concert of the musical at the 14th Street YMHA, New York City in October 2003.

The musical was presented in a staged concert by Encores! in February 2016, starring Chuck Cooper, Norm Lewis, and LaChanze.

== Synopsis ==
Act I

Little Joe is dying. Lucifer Jr prepares to bring his soul to hell (Little Papa Satan). Little Joe protests, and his wife Petunia’s praying causes the Lawd's General to appear (The General's Entrance). The General proclaims that Heaven will grant Little Joe six more months of life, and if he can redeem himself during that time, he will be let into heaven (The Man Upstairs). Little Joe becomes conscious again and Petunia rejoices (Taking a Chance on Love). During Joe's recovery, Lucifer Jr attempts to ruin Petunia and Little Joe by claiming that Little Joe owes him a large amount of money in gambling debts. Petunia says she will gamble with him to pay back the debt. She accuses him of cheating and chases him away. Little Joe comes out of the house, and for the first time is kind to Petunia. Petunia is ecstatic (Cabin in the Sky). The Pastor welcomes Little Joe back to the Church (Holy Unto the Lord/Dem Bones). In Hell, Lucifer Jr comes up with a plan to tempt Little Joe and delivers a broadcast to the other members of Hell (Do What You Wanna Do). He gives Little Joe a sweepstakes ticket, which Petunia lets Joe keep (Finale Act I).

Act II

The Act begins with a prologue with the Lawd’s General describing the nature of temptation (Fugue). Little Joe and Petunia are very happy and dream of moving far away where they can be alone (My Old Virginia Home on the Nile). Lucifer Jr sends Little Joe a dream featuring the alluring Queen of Sheba (Vision Ballet). The Lawd’s General tells Little Joe to throw away the ticket (It's Not So Bad to Be Good). Joe's former lover, Georgia Brown, shows up and vamps him (Love Me Tomorrow). Petunia walks in on this and throws Little Joe out (Love Turned the Light Out). Little Joe flees to a Cafe (Cafe Dance: Lazy Steps and Boogy Woogy). Georgia Brown follows him (Honey in the Honeycomb). Petunia also shows up and, in an attempt to win Joe back, demands $1000 and says she is leaving for "Savannah". In the resulting tumult, Petunia and Little Joe are killed. Both are let into Heaven as their deaths caused Georgia Brown to reform and join the church (Finale Act II).

== Musical numbers ==
Act I

Scene One: The Church

- "Wade in the Water" - Churchmembers
- "Little Papa Satan" - Lucifer Jr
- "The General's Entrance" - Lawd's General and Saints
- "The Man Upstairs (Pay Heed)" - Lawd's General and Saints
- "Taking a Chance on Love" - Petunia
- "Taking a Chance on Love (Encore)" - Petunia

Scene Two: Petunia and Little Joe's Home

- "Cabin in the Sky" - Petunia and Little Joe
- "Holy Unto the Lord/Dem Bones" - Petunia, Little Joe, Brother Green, J. Rosamond Johnson Singers, and Churchmembers

Scene Three: In Hell

- "Do What You Wanna Do" - Lucifier Jr and Imps

Scene Four: Petunia and Little Joe's Home

- "Finale Act I" - Orchestra

Act II

Scene One: Petunia and Little Joe's Home

- "Fugue" - Lawd's General and Saints
- "My Old Virginia Home on the Nile" - Petunia and Little Joe
- "Vision Ballet" - The Dunham Dancers
- "It's Not So Good To Be Bad" - Lawd's General
- "Love Me Tomorrow" - Georgia Brown and Little Joe
- "Love Turned the Light Out" - Petunia

Scene Two: The Cafe

- "Lazy Steps" - The Dunham Dancers
- "Boogy Woogy" - The Dunham Dancers
- "Honey in the Honeycomb" - Georgia Brown and Boys
- "Savannah" - Petunia
- "Death of Petunia and Little Joe" - Lawd's General

Scene Three: Before Heaven

- "Finale Act II: Cabin in the Sky (Reprise)" - Company

== Characters and original cast ==
The original Broadway characters and cast:

Character	Broadway (1940)
Petunia	Ethel Waters
Little Joe	Dooley Wilson
Lucifer Junior	Rex Ingram
Georgia Brown	Katherine Dunham
Lawd's General	Todd Duncan
Fleetfoot	Milton Williams
Dr. Jones	Louis Sharp
John Henry	J. Louis Johnson
Lily	Georgia Burke
Domino Johnson	Dick Campbell
Imps	Jieno Moxzer Harris
Sister Green	J. Rosamond Johnson

== Critical reception ==
The musical was very well received. Gerald Bordman wrote "Wisely, everyone involved in the show rejected the easy excesses and crassness so many musicals resorted to. Certainly they avoided turning the evening into a black minstrel show. Throughout the production a tasteful restraint, a sense of what as appropriate to the story, was maintained. This rare display of integrity made Cabin in the Sky an attractive enough evening to keep ticket buyers coming for 20 weeks."

Brooks Atkinson wrote "Vernon Duke has written racy music in several veins from song hits to boogie-woogie orgies. Mr Latouche has composed crisp and jaunty lyrics. As scene and costume designer, Boris Aronson has done his finest work, giving to pure imagination many vivid shapes and flaring colors. Put "Cabin In The Sky" down as a labor of love by a group of theatre people who have enjoyed working on something that is bursting with life."

Thomas S. Hischak wrote, "With enthusiastic reviews, an outstanding score, and a powerhouse cast of some of the finest African Americans in the business, it was surprising the musical did not run longer than twenty weeks."

However, not everyone liked the show. Critic Richard Watts, Jr. wrote in his review that the show was "merely a white man's self-conscious attempt to write a pseudo-folk fable of another race."

Cabin in the Sky proved to be the last major success of Duke's career.

The show was made into the 1943 film Cabin in the Sky, but as Denny Flinn stated in his 1997 book, Musical! "It is noble that Hollywood made a black musical at all, but there are too many interpolations to the John Latouche-Vernon Duke score."
