= Japanese Festival Music =

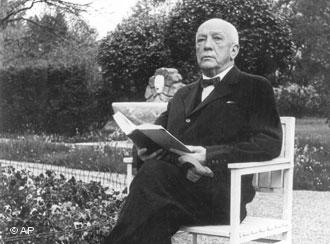
Richard Strauss, 1938

Japanese Festival Music, Op. 84 (1940), is a composition by Richard Strauss. The full title is Festmusik zur Feier des 2600jährigen Bestehens des Kaiserreichs Japan für großes Orchester (Japanische Festmusik).

== History ==
The Japanese government commissioned music from composers of six nations to mark the 2600th Anniversary Celebrations of the Japanese Empire. Other composers writing for the festivities included:

- Hisato Ohzawa who wrote his Symphony no. 3, "Symphony of the Founding of Japan"
- Jacques Ibert who wrote an Ouverture de fête "pour célébrer le 26e centenaire de la fondation de l'empire Nippon"
- Ildebrando Pizzetti who wrote a Symphony "In Celebrazione dell XXVIo Centenario della Fondazione dell'Impero Giapponese"
- Sándor Veress who wrote his first symphony, "Hungarian Greetings on the 2600th Anniversary of the Japanese Dynasty"
- Benjamin Britten's Sinfonia da Requiem was also commissioned in this process, but was ultimately rejected by the Japanese foreign ministry as an insult.

Japan's request for a composition from an American composer was turned down due to the deterioration of relations between the countries.

Joseph Goebbels assigned the Japanese commission to Germany's most prominent composer, Richard Strauss. Strauss, age 75, put aside composition on his opera Die Liebe der Danae to work on Japanese Festival Music while staying in the Italian Tyrol. He completed the work on April 22, 1940 and received 10,000 Reichsmarks for his effort.

== Instrumentation ==
Japanese Festival Music is written for a large orchestra 3 Flutes (piccolo), 2 oboes, English Horn, 4 clarinets, bass clarinet, 3 bassoons, contrabassoon, 8 French horns, 4 trumpets, 4 trombones, 2 Tubas, 14 tuned temple gongs, timpani, bass drum, cymbals, triangle, tam-tam, snare drum, tambourine, glockenspiel, two harps and strings. There is also an option for either an organ or an additional 3 trumpets, 4 trombones and 2 French horns.

== Structure ==
There are five sections:

- Meerszene (Seascape)
- Kirschblütenfest (Cherry Blossom Festival)
- Vulkanausbruch (Volcanic Eruption)
- Angriff der Samurai (Attack of the Samurai)
- Loblied auf den Kaiser (Hymn of the Emperor)

== Performance history ==
The première was at the Kabukiza Theatre, Tokyo on December 14, 1940. Helmut Fellmer, a music professor in Tokyo at the time, conducted the NHK Symphony Orchestra (augmented to 165 musicians for this occasion and called The Symphony Orchestra in Celebration of the 2600th Anniversary of the Japanese Imperial Dynasty). The audience for this occasion also heard the other three commemorative works. Fellmer conducted this orchestra again on December 19, 1940 for a recording on Nippon Columbia. The first European performance was in Stuttgart on October 27, 1941 with Hermann Albert conducting.

Japanese Festival Music is probably Richard Strauss's least programmed work and is often described as one of his weakest compositions. Norman Del Mar compared it to the Festliches Präludium (Festive Prelude for Orchestra and Organ) in which “a vast orchestra piles one towering climax upon another”. Strauss conducted the work for recording in late 1940 with the Bavarian State Opera Orchestra (possibly he recorded it before the Tokyo premiere); this recording was issued on CD in 1990 by Deutsche Grammophon in a 3-CD set of Strauss conducting his own works (catalogue number 429 925-2 GDO3), and four years later on Preiser 90205. The duration of the work is approximately fourteen minutes. The score was published by Oertel in Berlin in 1941 (on the cover is a crest of the chrysanthemum against a red background) and is obtainable from Boosey & Hawkes.

== See also ==
- Emperor Jimmu
