= Slovakia =

Country in Central Europe

Slovak Republic Slovenská republika
- Flag Coat of arms
- Anthem: "Nad Tatrou sa blýska" (Slovak) ("Lightning Over the Tatras")
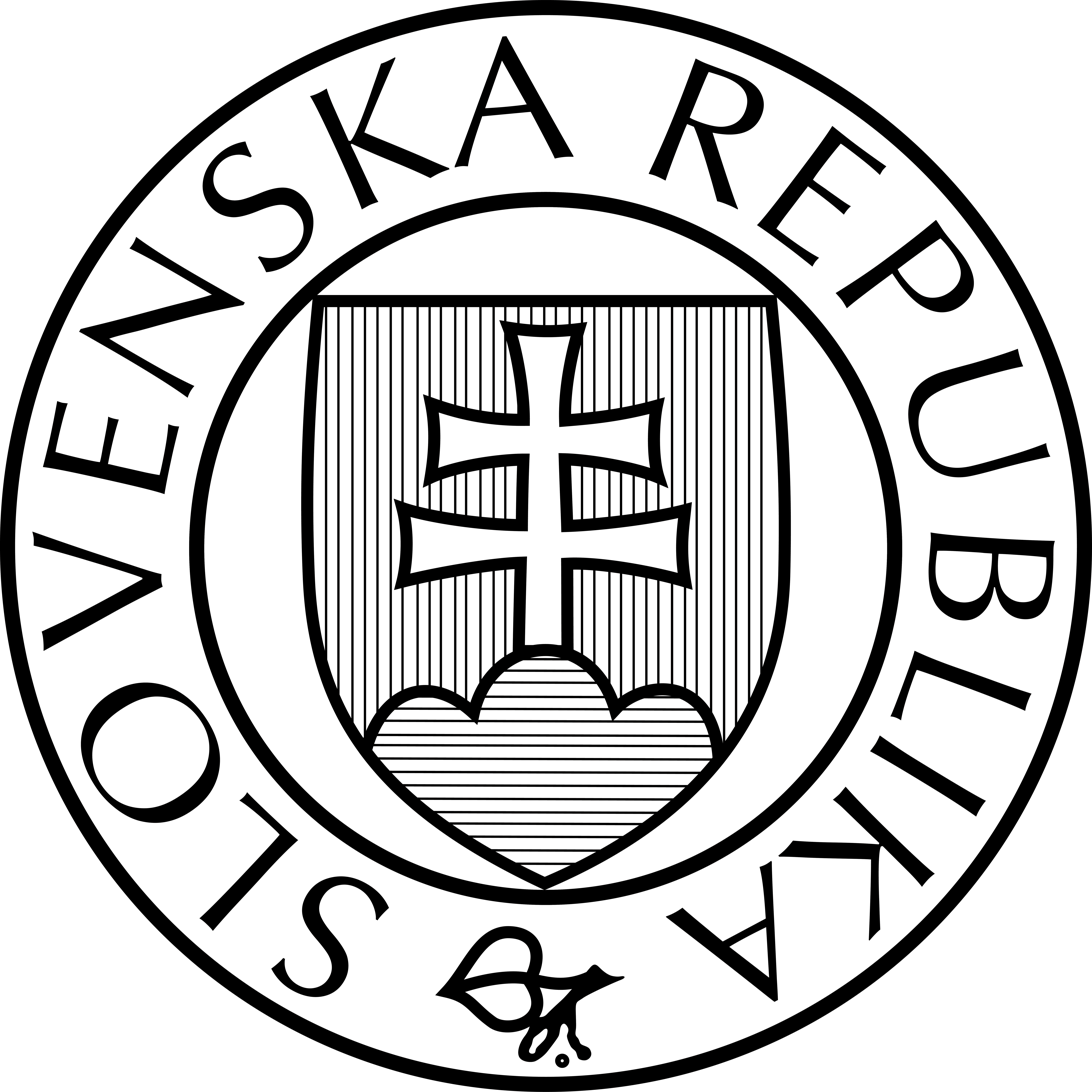
- National seal

- Location of Slovakia (dark green) – in Europe (green & dark grey) – in the European Union (green) – [Legend]
- Capital and largest city: Bratislava; 48°9′9″N 17°6′34″E
- Official languages: Slovak
- Regional and minority languages: Bulgarian, Czech, Croatian, Hungarian, German, Polish, Romani, Russian, Ruthenian, Serbian, Ukrainian
- Ethnic groups (2021) (Note: excluding the unspecified population which counts 295,558 people or 5.4%): 88.6% Slovaks; 8.2% Hungarians; 1.3% Romani; 1.9% others
- Religion (2021): 68.8% Christianity; 59.8% Catholicism; 7.6% Protestantism; 1.4% other Christian; 23.8% no religion; 0.9% other; 6.5% unspecified
- Demonym: Slovak
- Government: Unitary parliamentary republic
  - President: Peter Pellegrini
  - Prime Minister: Robert Fico
  - Speaker of the National Council: Richard Raši
- Legislature: National Council

Establishment history
  - Independence from Austria-Hungary (First Czechoslovak Republic): 28 October 1918
  - Treaty of Trianon: 4 June 1920
  - Second Czechoslovak Republic: 30 September 1938
  - First Slovak Republic: 14 March 1939
  - Third Czechoslovak Republic: 24 October 1945
  - Fourth Czechoslovak Republic: 25 February 1948
  - Czechoslovak Socialist Republic: 11 July 1960
  - Slovak Socialist Republic (within Czechoslovak Socialist Republic, change of unitary Czechoslovak state into a federation): 1 January 1969
  - Slovak Republic (change of name within established Czech and Slovak Federative Republic): 1 March 1990
  - Dissolution of Czechoslovakia: 1 January 1993

Area
  - Total: 49,035 km^{2} (18,933 sq mi) (127th)
  - Water (%): 0.72 (2015)

Population
  - 30 June 2026 estimate: ▼5,403,009 (121th)
  - 2021 census: ▲5,449,270
  - Density: 110/km^{2} (284.9/sq mi) (103rd)
- GDP (PPP): 2026 estimate
  - Total: ▲$269.179 billion (75th)
  - Per capita: ▲$49,761 (47th)
- GDP (nominal): 2026 estimate
  - Total: ▲$167.062 billion (58th)
  - Per capita: ▲$30,884 (44th)
- Gini (2022): ▼21.2 low inequality
- HDI (2023): ▲0.880 very high (44th)
- Currency: Euro (€) (EUR)
- Time zone: UTC+1 (CET)
  - Summer (DST): UTC+2 (CEST)
- Date format: DD/MM/YYYY
- Calling code: +421
- ISO 3166 code: SK
- Internet TLD: .sk and .eu
- Website slovensko.sk

Slovakia, (Note: /sloʊˈvækiə, -ˈvɑːk-/ Slovak: Slovensko [ˈslɔʋenskɔ]) officially the Slovak Republic, (Note: Slovak: Slovenská republika [ˈslɔʋenskaː ˈrepublika]) is a landlocked country in Central Europe. It is bordered by Poland to the north, Ukraine to the east, Hungary to the south, Austria to the west, and the Czech Republic to the northwest. Slovakia's mostly mountainous territory spans about 49,000 km^{2} (19,000 sq mi), hosting a population exceeding 5.4 million. The capital and largest city is Bratislava, while the second largest city is Košice.

The Slavs arrived in the territory of the present-day Slovakia in the 5th and 6th centuries. From the late 6th century, parts of modern Slovakia were incorporated into the Avar Khaganate. In the 7th century, the Slavs played a significant role in the creation of Samo's Empire. When the Avar Khaganate dissolved in the 9th century, the Slavs established the Principality of Nitra before it was annexed by the Principality of Moravia, which later became Great Moravia. When Great Moravia fell in the 10th century, the territory was integrated into the Principality of Hungary at the end of the 9th century, which later became the Kingdom of Hungary in 1000. In 1241 and 1242, after the Mongol invasion of Europe, much of the territory was destroyed, but was recovered largely thanks to Hungarian king Béla IV. During the 16th and 17th centuries, southern portions of present-day Slovakia were incorporated into provinces of the Ottoman Empire. The Ottoman-controlled areas were ceded to the Habsburgs by the turn of the 18th century. The Hungarian declaration of independence in 1848 was followed in the same year by the Slovak Uprising through the establishment of the Slovak National Council. While the uprising did not achieve its aim, it played an important role in cementing a Slovak national identity. The Hungarian wars of independence eventually resulted in a compromise that established the Austro-Hungarian Empire.

During World War I, the Czechoslovak National Council successfully fought for independence amidst the collapse of the Austro-Hungarian Empire, and the state of Czechoslovakia was proclaimed in 1918. The borders were set by the Treaty of Saint Germain in 1919 and by the Treaty of Trianon in 1920. Czechoslovakia incorporated the territory of present-day Slovakia which was entirely part of the Kingdom of Hungary. In the lead up to World War II, local fascist parties gradually came to power in the Slovak lands, and the first Slovak Republic was established in 1939 as a one-party clerical fascist client state under the control of Nazi Germany. In 1940, the country joined the Axis when its leaders signed the Tripartite Pact. Czechoslovakia was re-established after the country's liberation at the end of the war in 1945. Following the Soviet-backed coup of 1948, Czechoslovakia became a communist state within the Eastern Bloc, a satellite state of the Soviet Union behind the Iron Curtain and member of the Warsaw Pact. Attempts to liberalise communism culminated in the Prague Spring, which was suppressed by the Warsaw Pact invasion of Czechoslovakia in August 1968. In 1989, the Velvet Revolution peacefully ended Communist rule in Czechoslovakia. Slovakia became an independent democratic state on 1 January 1993 after the peaceful dissolution of Czechoslovakia, sometimes referred to as the Velvet Divorce.

Slovakia is a developed country with an advanced high-income economy. The country maintains a combination of a market economy with a comprehensive social security system, providing citizens with universal health care, free education, one of the lowest retirement ages in Europe and one of the longest paid parental leaves in the OECD. Slovakia is a member of the European Union, the eurozone, the Schengen Area, the United Nations, NATO, CERN, the OECD, the WTO, the Council of Europe, the Visegrád Group, and the OSCE. Slovakia is also home to eight UNESCO World Heritage Sites. Known as the "European Detroit" due to its dense concentration of automotive manufacturing, Slovakia is the world's largest per-capita car producer. The country manufactured a total of 1.08 million cars in 2023, with the automotive sector representing 44% of its total industrial output.

== Etymology ==
Slovakia's name means the "Land of the Slavs" (Slovensko in Slovak stemming from the older form Sloven/Slovienin). As such, it is a cognate of the words Slovenia and Slavonia. In medieval Latin, German, and even some Slavic sources, the same name has often been used for Slovaks, Slovenes, Slavonians, and Slavs in general. According to one of the theories, a new form of national name formed for the ancestors of the Slovaks between the 13th and 14th century, possibly due to foreign influence; the Czech word Slovák (in medieval sources from 1291 onward). This form slowly replaced the name for the male members of the community, but the female name (Slovenka), reference to the lands inhabited (Slovensko) and the name of the language (slovenčina) all remained the same, with their base in the older form (compare to Slovenian counterparts). Most foreign translations tend to stem from this newer form (Slovakia in English, Slowakei in German, Slovaquie in French, etc.).

In medieval Latin sources, terms: Slavus, Slavonia, or Slavorum (and more variants, from as early as 1029) have been used. In German sources, names for the Slovak lands were Windenland or Windische Lande (early 15th century), with the forms Slovakia and Schlowakei starting to appear in the 16th century. The present Slovak form Slovensko is first attested in the year 1675.

== History ==
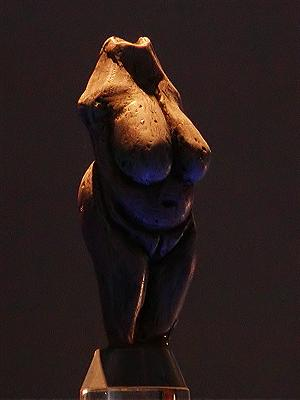
A Venus from Moravany nad Váhom, which dates back to 22,800 BC

The oldest surviving human artefacts from Slovakia are found near Nové Mesto nad Váhom and are dated at 270,000 BCE, in the Early Paleolithic era. These ancient tools, made by the Clactonian technique, bear witness to the ancient habitation of Slovakia.

Other stone tools from the Middle Paleolithic era (200,000–80,000 BCE) come from the Prévôt (Prepoštská) cave in Bojnice and from other nearby sites. The most important discovery from that era is a Neanderthal cranium (c. 200,000 BCE), discovered near Gánovce, a village in northern Slovakia.

Archaeologists have found prehistoric human skeletons in the region, as well as numerous objects and vestiges of the Gravettian culture, principally in the river valleys of Nitra, Hron, Ipeľ, Váh and as far as the city of Žilina, and near the foot of the Vihorlat, Inovec, and Tribeč mountains, as well as in the Myjava Mountains. The most well-known finds include the oldest female statue made of mammoth bone (22,800 BCE), the famous Venus of Moravany. The statue was found in the 1940s in Moravany nad Váhom near Piešťany. Numerous necklaces made of shells from Cypraca thermophile gastropods of the Tertiary period have come from the sites of Zákovská, Podkovice, Hubina, and Radošina. These findings provide the most ancient evidence of commercial exchanges carried out between the Mediterranean and Central Europe.

=== Bronze Age ===
During the Bronze Age, the geographical territory of modern-day Slovakia went through three stages of development, stretching from 2000 to 800 BCE. Major cultural, economic, and political development can be attributed to the significant growth in production of copper, especially in central Slovakia (for example in Špania Dolina) and northwest Slovakia. Copper became a stable source of prosperity for the local population.

After the disappearance of the Čakany and Velatice cultures, the Lusatian people expanded building of strong and complex fortifications, with the large permanent buildings and administrative centres. Excavations of Lusatian hill forts document the substantial development of trade and agriculture at that period. The richness and diversity of tombs increased considerably. The inhabitants of the area manufactured arms, shields, jewellery, dishes, and statues.

=== Iron Age ===
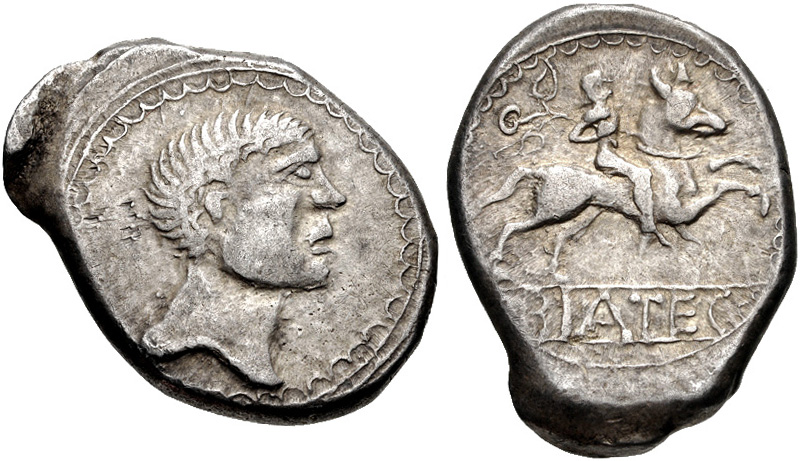
Biatec, presumably a king, who appeared on the Celtic coins minted by the Boii at the current location of Bratislava, 1st century B.C.

==== Hallstatt Period ====
The arrival of tribes from Thrace disrupted the people of the Kalenderberg culture, who lived in the hamlets located on the plain (Sereď) and in the hill forts like Molpír, near Smolenice, in the Little Carpathians. During Hallstatt times, monumental burial mounds were erected in western Slovakia, with princely equipment consisting of richly decorated vessels, ornaments and decorations. The burial rites consisted entirely of cremation. Common people were buried in flat urnfield cemeteries.

A special role was given to weaving and the production of textiles. The local power of the "Princes" of the Hallstatt period disappeared in Slovakia during the century before the middle of first millennium BCE, after strife between the Scytho-Thracian people and locals, resulting in abandonment of the old hill-forts. Relatively depopulated areas soon caught the interest of emerging Celtic tribes, who advanced from the south towards the north, following the Slovak rivers, peacefully integrating into the remnants of the local population.

==== La Tène Period ====
From around 500 BCE, the territory of modern-day Slovakia was settled by Celts, who built powerful oppida on the sites of modern-day Bratislava and Devín. Biatecs, silver coins with inscriptions in the Latin alphabet, represent the first known use of writing in Slovakia. At the northern regions, remnants of the local population of Lusatian origin, together with Celtic and later Dacian influence, gave rise to the unique Púchov culture, with advanced crafts and iron-working, many hill-forts and fortified settlements of central type with the coinage of the "Velkobysterecky" type (no inscriptions, with a horse on one side and a head on the other). This culture is often connected with the Celtic tribe mentioned in Roman sources as Cotini.

==== Roman Period ====
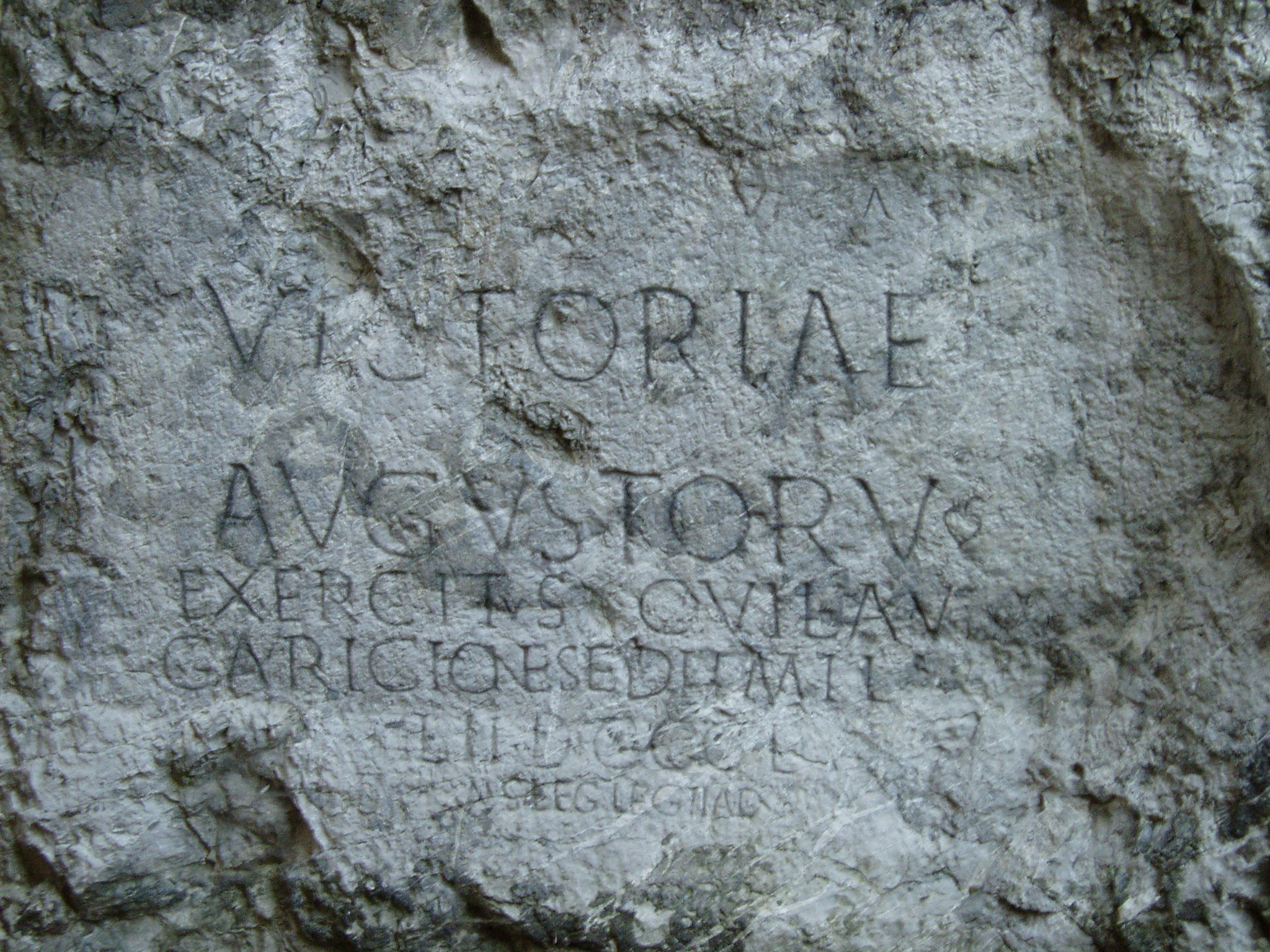
A Roman inscription at the castle hill of Trenčín (178–179 AD)

From 2 CE, the expanding Roman Empire established and maintained a series of outposts around and just south of the Danube, the largest of which were known as Carnuntum (whose remains are on the main road halfway between Vienna and Bratislava) and Brigetio (present-day Szőny at the Slovak-Hungarian border). Such Roman border settlements were built on the present area of Rusovce, currently a suburb of Bratislava. The military fort was surrounded by a civilian vicus and several farms of the villa rustica type. The name of this settlement was Gerulata. The military fort had an auxiliary cavalry unit, approximately 300 horses strong, modelled after the Cananefates. The remains of Roman buildings have also survived in Stupava, Devín Castle, Bratislava Castle Hill, and the Bratislava-Dúbravka suburb.

Near the northernmost line of the Roman hinterlands, the Limes Romanus, there existed the winter camp of Laugaricio (modern-day Trenčín) where the Auxiliary of Legion II fought and prevailed in a decisive battle over the Germanic Quadi tribe in 179 CE during the Marcomannic Wars. The Kingdom of Vannius, a kingdom founded by the Germanic Suebi tribes of Quadi and Marcomanni, as well as several small Germanic and Celtic tribes, including the Osi and Cotini, existed in western and central Slovakia from 8–6 BCE to 179 CE.

=== Great invasions from the fourth to seventh centuries ===
In the second and third centuries CE, the Huns began to leave the Central Asian steppes. They crossed the Danube in 377 CE and occupied Pannonia, which they used for 75 years as their base for launching looting-raids into Western Europe. However, Attila's death in 453 brought about the disappearance of the Hunnic empire. In 568, a Turko-Mongol tribal confederacy, the Avar Khaganate, conducted its invasion into the Middle Danube region. The Avars occupied the lowlands of the Pannonian Plain and established an empire dominating the Carpathian Basin.

In 623, the Slavic population living in the western parts of Pannonia seceded from their empire after a revolution led by Samo, a Frankish merchant. After 626, the Avar power started a gradual decline but its reign lasted to 804.

=== Avars ===
In 568, the Avars, under Khagan Bayan I established an empire in the Carpathian Basin that lasted for 250 years.

=== Slavic states ===
The Slavic tribes settled in the territory of present-day Slovakia in the fifth century. Western Slovakia was the centre of Samo's empire in the seventh century. A Slavic state known as the Principality of Nitra arose in the eighth century and its ruler Pribina had the first known Christian church of the territory of present-day Slovakia consecrated by 828. Together with neighbouring Moravia, the principality formed the core of the Great Moravian Empire from 833. The high point of this Slavonic empire came with the arrival of Saints Cyril and Methodius in 863, during the reign of Duke Rastislav, and the territorial expansion under King Svätopluk I.

==== Great Moravia (830–before 907) ====
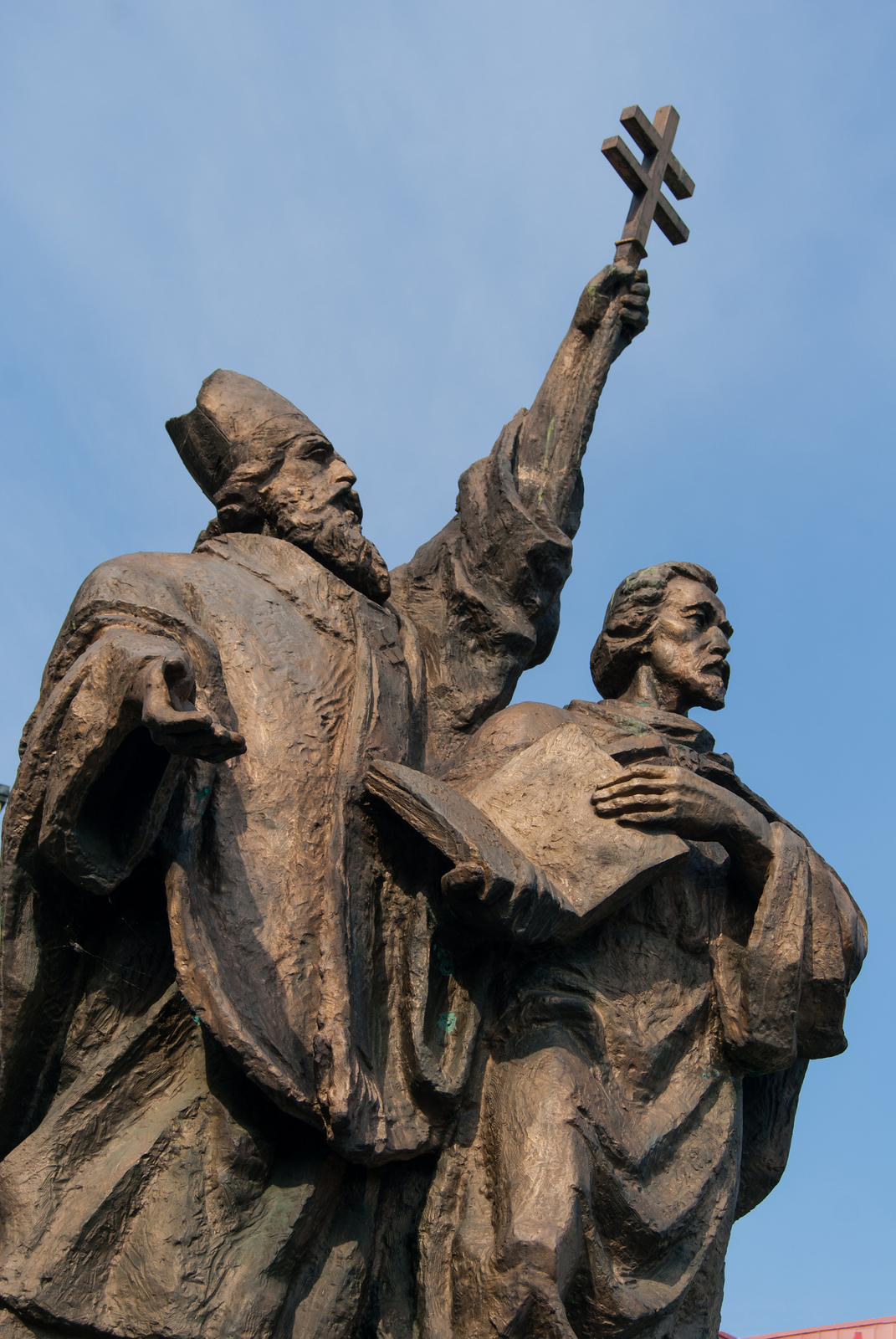
A statue of Saint Cyril and Saint Methodius in Žilina. In 863, they introduced Christianity to what is now Slovakia.

Great Moravia arose around 830 when Mojmír I unified the Slavic tribes settled north of the Danube and extended the Moravian supremacy over them. When Mojmír I endeavoured to secede from the supremacy of the king of East Francia in 846, King Louis the German deposed him and assisted Mojmír's nephew Rastislav (846–870) in acquiring the throne. The new monarch pursued an independent policy: after stopping a Frankish attack in 855, he also sought to weaken the influence of Frankish priests preaching in his realm. Duke Rastislav asked the Byzantine Emperor Michael III to send teachers who would interpret Christianity in the Slavic vernacular.

In 862, Prince Rastislav of Moravia rebelled against the Franks, and after hiring Hungarian troops, won his independence; this was the first time that Hungarians expeditionary troops entered the Carpathian Basin.

On Rastislav's request, two brothers, Byzantine officials and missionaries Saints Cyril and Methodius came in 863. Cyril developed the first Slavic alphabet and translated the Gospel into the Old Church Slavonic language. Rastislav was also preoccupied with the security and administration of his state. Numerous fortified castles built throughout the country are dated to his reign and some of them (e.g., Dowina, sometimes identified with Devín Castle) are also mentioned in connection with Rastislav by Frankish chronicles.

During Rastislav's reign, the Principality of Nitra was given to his nephew Svätopluk as an appanage. The rebellious prince allied himself with the Franks and overthrew his uncle in 870. Similarly to his predecessor, Svätopluk I (871–894) assumed the title of the king (rex). During his reign, the Great Moravian Empire reached its greatest territorial extent, when not only present-day Moravia and Slovakia but also present-day northern and central Hungary, Lower Austria, Bohemia, Silesia, Lusatia, southern Poland and northern Serbia belonged to the empire, but the exact borders of his domains are still disputed by modern authors. Svatopluk also withstood attacks of the Magyar tribes and the Bulgarian Empire, although sometimes it was he who hired the Magyars when waging war against East Francia.

In 880, Pope John VIII set up an independent ecclesiastical province in Great Moravia with Archbishop Methodius as its head. He also named the German cleric Wiching the bishop of Nitra.

Certain and disputed borders of Great Moravia under Svatopluk I (according to modern historians)

After the death of Prince Svatopluk in 894, his sons Mojmír II (894–906?) and Svatopluk II succeeded him as the Prince of Great Moravia and the Prince of Nitra respectively. However, they started to quarrel for domination of the whole empire. Weakened by an internal conflict as well as by constant warfare with Eastern Francia, Great Moravia lost most of its peripheral territories.

It is not known what happened with both Mojmír II and Svatopluk II because they are not mentioned in written sources after 906. In three battles (4–5 July and 9 August 907) near Bratislava, the Magyars routed Bavarian armies. Some historians put this year as the date of the break-up of the Great Moravian Empire, due to the Hungarian conquest; other historians take the date a little bit earlier (to 902).

Great Moravia left behind a lasting legacy in Central and Eastern Europe. The Glagolitic script and its successor Cyrillic were disseminated to other Slavic countries, charting a new path in their sociocultural development.

=== Grand Principality of Hungary (895–1000) ===
Foundation of the Hungarian state is connected to the Hungarian conquerors, who arrived from the Pontic steppes as a confederation of seven tribes. The Hungarians arrived in the frame of a strong centralized steppe-empire under the leadership of Grand Prince Álmos and his son Árpád, they became founders of the Árpád dynasty, the Hungarian ruling dynasty and the Hungarian state. The Árpád dynasty claimed to be a direct descendant of the great Hun leader Attila. The Hungarians took possession of the Carpathian Basin in a pre-planned manner, with a long move-in between 862 and 895. Their armies' advance may have been promoted by continuous wars among the countries of the region whose rulers still hired them occasionally to intervene in their struggles.

Just a few decades after the collapse of the Avar Khaganate in 822, once again a steppe empire, the Hungarian Grand Principality united the Carpathian Basin under its rule. Only the East Frankish Empire had such military power that it could intervent in the formation of the new order. His leadership also wanted to eliminate the new steppe state because the East Frankish Empire lost Pannonia and its Christian Avar taxpayers, and his territory was hit by increasing attacks by the Hungarians, especially Bavaria, which was then the eastern province of the Eastern Frankish Kingdom. In 907, three East Francian armies led by Luitpold, Margrave of Bavaria, which entered the Hungarian territory in order to expel the Hungarians from the Carpathian Basin, is annihilated by the Hungarian army at the Battle of Pressburg. Luitpold, Margrave of Bavaria, Dietmar I, Archbishop of Salzburg, Prince Sieghard, 19 counts, 2 bishops, and 3 abbots are killed in the battle, together with the majority of the soldiers. The Hungarians secured the lands they gained during the Hungarian conquest of the Carpathian Basin, and prevented a future German invasion, the Germans did not launch an imperial scale campaign against Hungary for 123 years until 1030.

=== The Kingdom of Hungary, the Habsburg Monarchy and the Ottoman Empire (1000–1918) ===
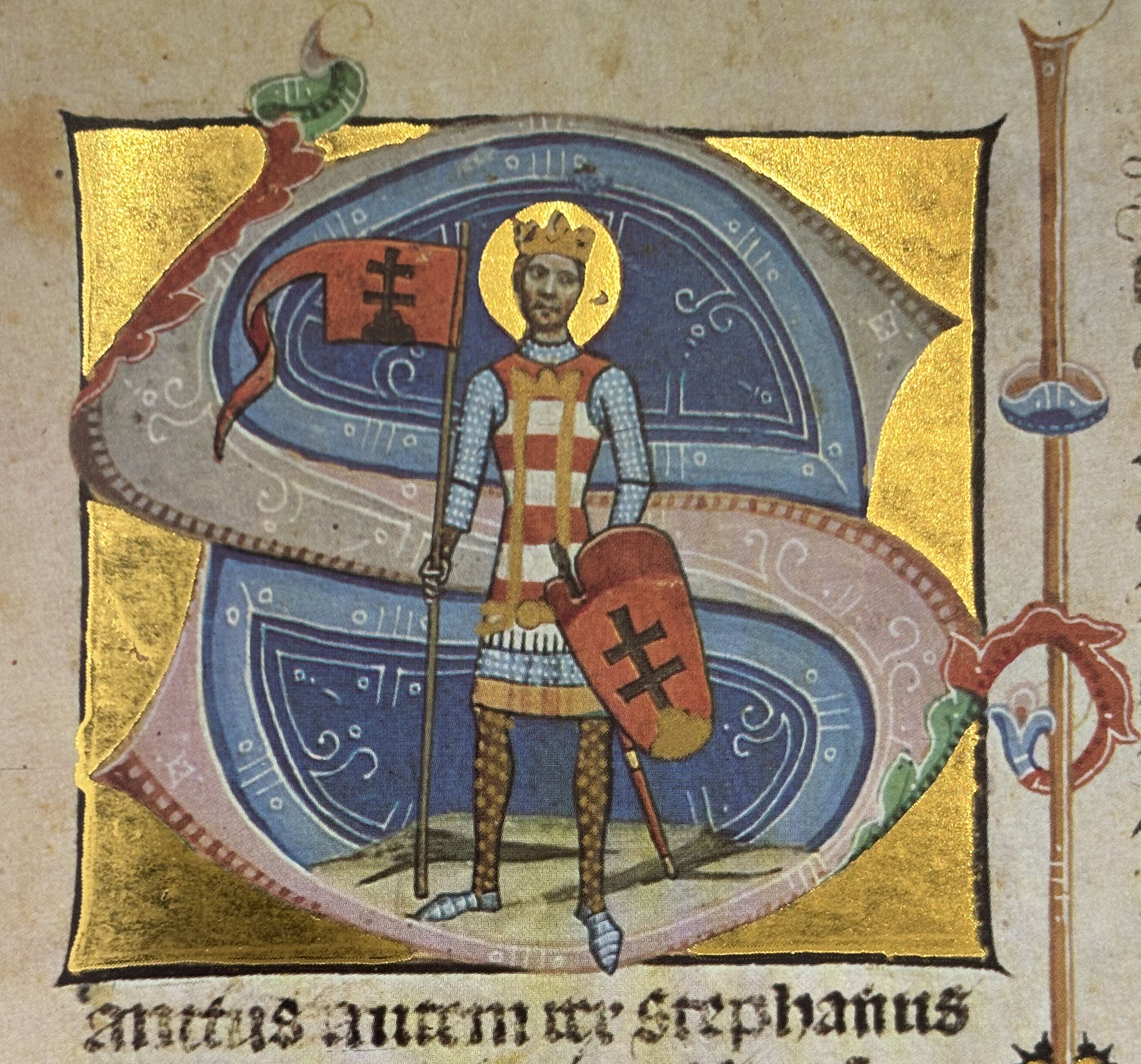
Stephen I, King of Hungary

In 972, the ruling prince Géza of the Árpád dynasty officially started to integrate Grand Principality of Hungary into Christian Western Europe. His son Saint Stephen I became the first King of Hungary after defeating his pagan uncle Koppány. Under Stephen, Hungary was recognised as a Catholic Apostolic Kingdom. Applying to Pope Sylvester II, Stephen received the insignia of royalty (including probably a part of the Holy Crown of Hungary) from the papacy.

In the years 1001–1002 and 1018–1029, Slovakia was part of the Kingdom of Poland, having been conquered by Boleslaus I the Brave. After the territory of Slovakia was returned to Hungary, a semi-autonomous polity continued to exist (or was created in 1048 by king Andrew I) called Duchy of Nitra. Comprising roughly the territory of Principality of Nitra and Bihar principality, they formed what was called a tercia pars regni, third of a kingdom.

This polity existed up until 1108/1110, after which it was not restored. After this, up until the collapse of Austria-Hungary in 1918, the territory of Slovakia was an integral part of the Hungarian state. The ethnic composition of Slovakia became more diverse with the arrival of the Carpathian Germans in the 13th century and the Jews in the 14th century.

A significant decline in the population resulted from the invasion of the Mongols in 1241 and the subsequent famine. After the invasion, much of the territory was destroyed, but was recovered largely thanks to Hungarian king Béla IV. However, in medieval times the area of Slovakia was characterised by German and Jewish immigration, burgeoning towns, construction of numerous stone castles, and the cultivation of the arts. The arrival of German element sometimes proved a problem for the autochthonous Slovaks (and even Hungarians in the broader Hungary), since they often quickly gained most power in medieval towns, only to later refuse to share it. Breaking of old customs by Germans often resulted in national quarrels. One of which had to be sorted out by the king Louis I. with the proclamation Privilegium pro Slavis (Privilege for Slovaks) in the year 1381. According to this privilege, Slovaks and Germans were to occupy each half of the seats in the city council of Žilina and the mayor should be elected each year, alternating between those nationalities. This would not be the last such case.

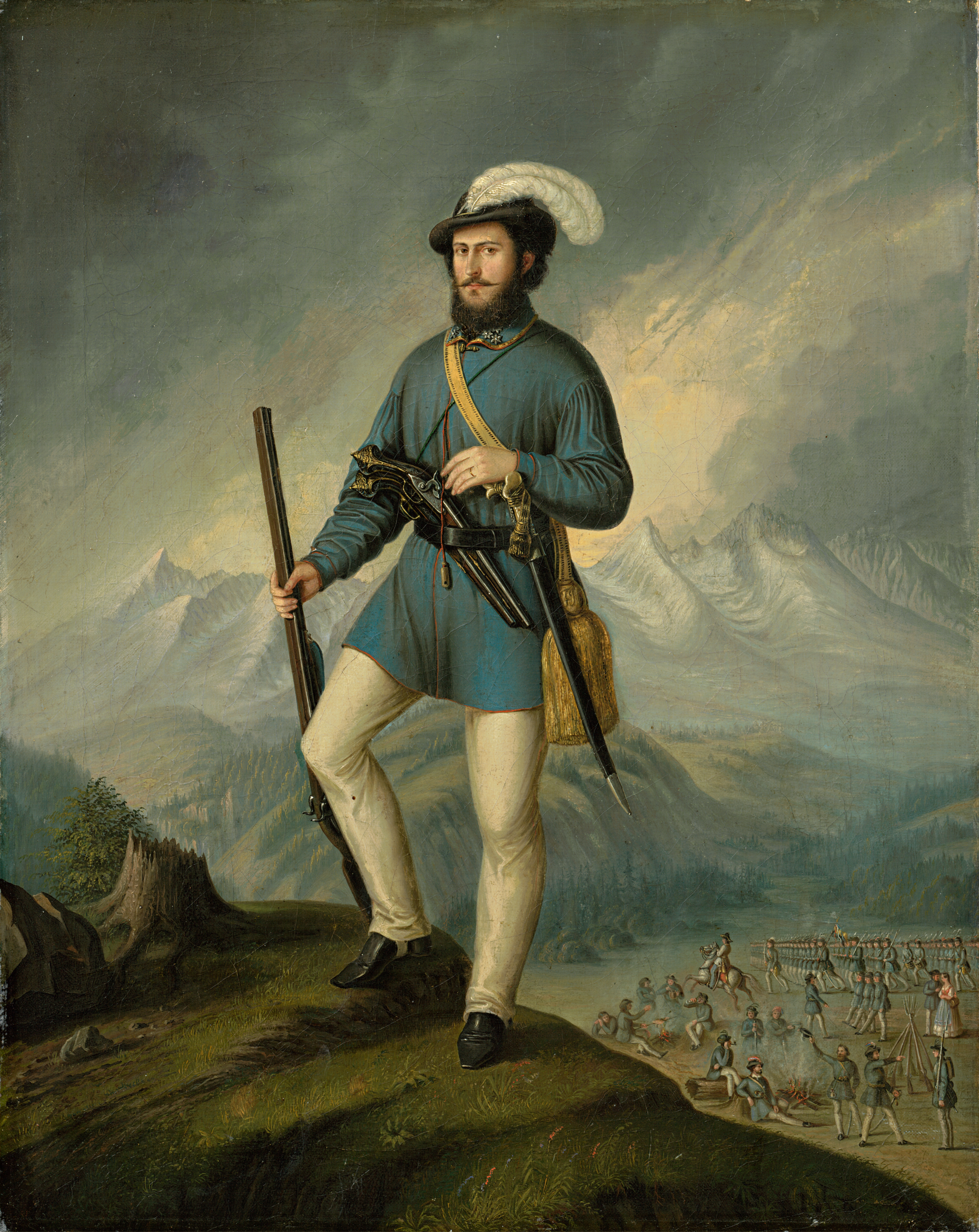
One of the commanders of a Slovak volunteers' army captain Ján Francisci-Rimavský during the fight for independence from the Kingdom of Hungary

In 1465, King Matthias Corvinus founded the Hungarian Kingdom's third university, in Pressburg (Bratislava), but it was closed in 1490 after his death. Hussites also settled in the region after the Hussite Wars.

Owing to the Ottoman Empire's expansion into Hungarian territory, Bratislava was designated the new capital of Hungary in 1536, ahead of the fall of the old Hungarian capital of Buda in 1541. It became part of the Austrian Habsburg monarchy, marking the beginning of a new era. The territory comprising modern Slovakia, then known as Upper Hungary, became the place of settlement for nearly two-thirds of the Magyar nobility fleeing the Turks and became far more linguistically and culturally Hungarian than it was before. Partly thanks to old Hussite families and Slovaks studying under Martin Luther, the region then experienced a growth in Protestantism. For a short period in the 17th century, most Slovaks were Lutherans. They defied the Catholic Habsburgs and sought protection from neighbouring Transylvania, a rival continuation of the Magyar state that practised religious tolerance and normally had Ottoman backing. Upper Hungary, modern Slovakia, became the site of frequent wars between Catholics in the west territory and Protestants in the east, as well as against Turks; the frontier was on a constant state of military alert and heavily fortified by castles and citadels often manned by Catholic German and Slovak troops on the Habsburg side. By 1648, Slovakia was not spared the Counter-Reformation, which brought the majority of its population from Lutheranism back to Roman Catholicism. In 1655, the printing press at the Trnava university produced the Jesuit Benedikt Szöllősi's Cantus Catholici, a Catholic hymnal in Slovak that reaffirmed links to the earlier works of Cyril and Methodius.

The Ottoman wars, the rivalry between Austria and Transylvania, and the frequent insurrections against the Habsburg monarchy inflicted a great deal of devastation, especially in the rural areas. In the Austro-Turkish War (1663–1664) a Turkish army led by the Grand Vizier decimated Slovakia. In 1682, the Principality of Upper Hungary, a short-lived Ottoman vassal state, was established in the territory of modern Slovakia. Prior to this, regions on its southern rim were already encompassed in the Egri, Budin and Uyvar eyalets. Thököly's kuruc rebels from the Principality of Upper Hungary fought alongside the Turks against the Austrians and Poles at the Battle of Vienna of 1683 led by John III Sobieski. As the Turks withdrew from Hungary in the late 17th century, the importance of the territory composing modern Slovakia decreased, although Pressburg retained its status as the capital of Hungary until 1848 when it was transferred back to Buda.

During the revolution of 1848–49, the Slovaks started uprising, supporting the Austrian Emperor, hoping for independence from the Hungarian part of the Dual Monarchy and greater autonomy within the empire. They failed to achieve their aim, but the conflict resulted in Slovak rights for language in certain administrative and educational areas.

Thereafter, relations between the nationalities deteriorated (see Magyarisation), culminating in the secession of Slovakia from Hungary after World War I.

=== Czechoslovak independence (1918–1939) ===
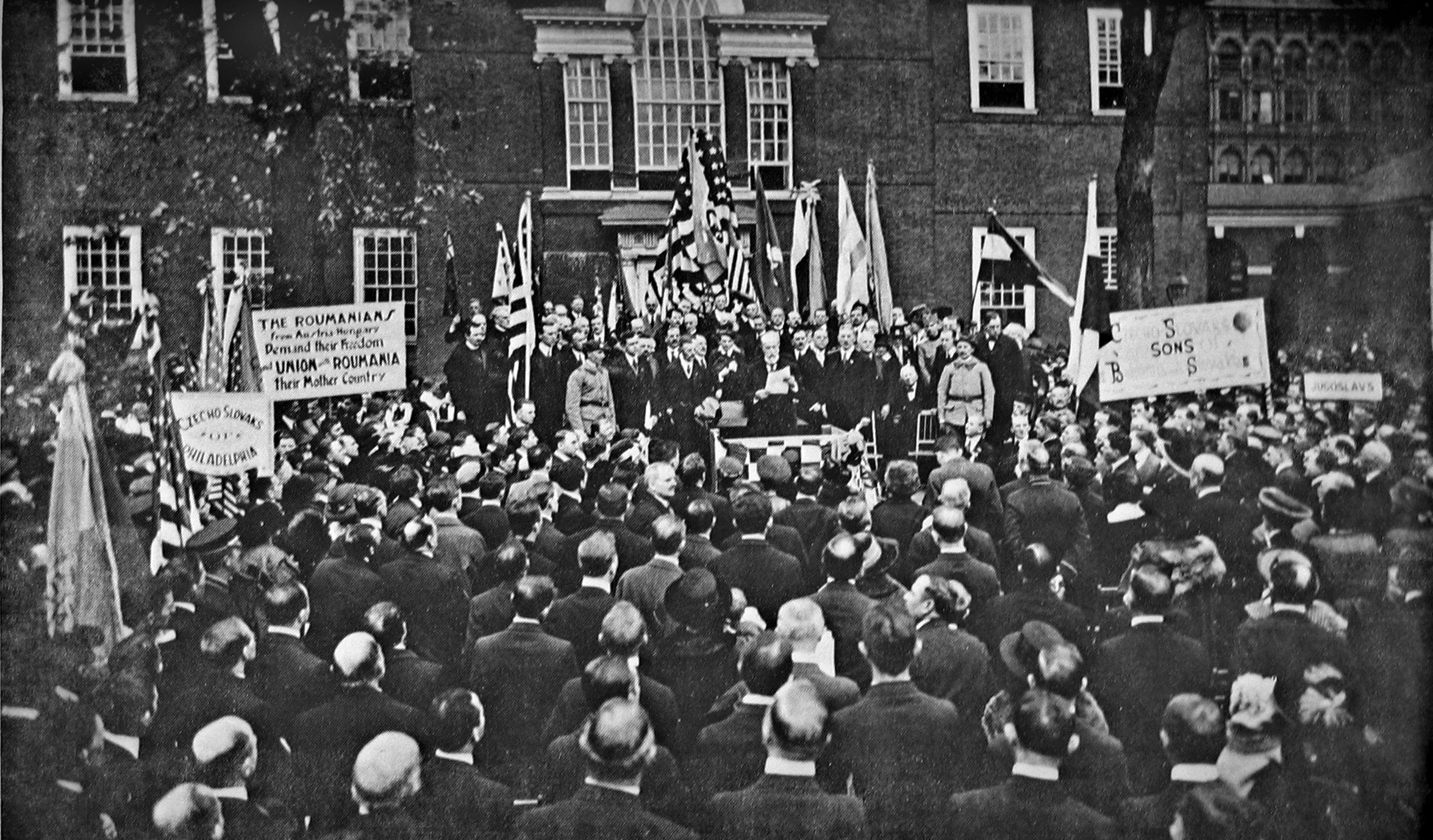
Czechoslovak declaration of independence by Tomáš Garrigue Masaryk in the United States, 1918

On 18 October 1918, Tomáš Garrigue Masaryk, Milan Rastislav Štefánik and Edvard Beneš declared in Washington, D.C. the independence for the territories of Bohemia, Moravia, Silesia, Upper Hungary and Carpathian Ruthenia from the Austro-Hungarian Empire and proclaimed a common state, Czechoslovakia.

During the chaos following the break-up of Austria-Hungary, Czechoslovakia was formed with numerous Czechs, Germans, Slovaks, Hungarians and Ruthenians. The borders were set by the Treaty of Saint Germain in 1919 and Treaty of Trianon in 1920. By the treaties following the World War I, Czechoslovakia emerged as a sovereign European state.

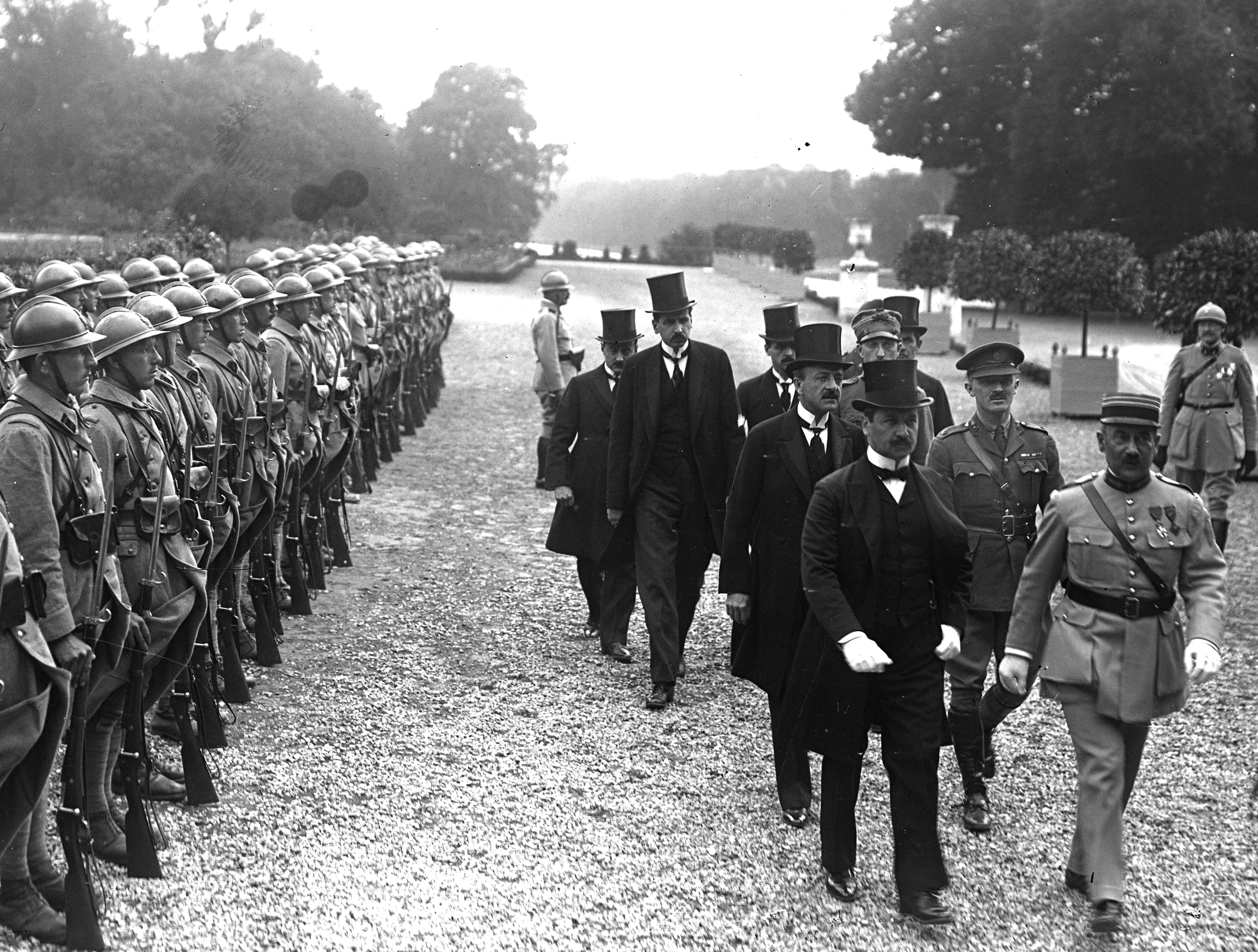
The Hungarian delegation arriving to Grand Trianon Palace at Versailles, to sign Treaty of Trianon, that cede territory of Slovakia (Upper Hungary) to Czechoslovakia after World War I, 1920

During the Interwar period, democratic Czechoslovakia was allied with France, and also with Romania and Yugoslavia (Little Entente); however, the Locarno Treaties of 1925 left East European security open. Both Czechs and Slovaks enjoyed a period of relative prosperity. There was progress in not only the development of the country's economy but also culture and educational opportunities. Yet the Great Depression caused a sharp economic downturn, followed by political disruption and insecurity in Europe.

In the 1930s, Czechoslovakia came under continuous pressure from the revanchist governments of Germany, Hungary and Poland who used the aggrieved minorities in the country as a useful vehicle. Revision of the borders was called for, as Czechs constituted only 43% of the population. Eventually, this pressure led to the Munich Agreement of September 1938, which allowed the majority ethnic Germans in the Sudetenland, borderlands of Czechoslovakia, to join with Germany. The remaining minorities stepped up their pressures for autonomy and the State became federalised, with Diets in Slovakia and Ruthenia. The remainder of Czechoslovakia was renamed Czecho-Slovakia and promised a greater degree of Slovak political autonomy. This, however, failed to materialise. Parts of southern and eastern Slovakia were also reclaimed by Hungary at the First Vienna Award of November 1938.

=== Fascist regime during World War II (1939–1945) ===
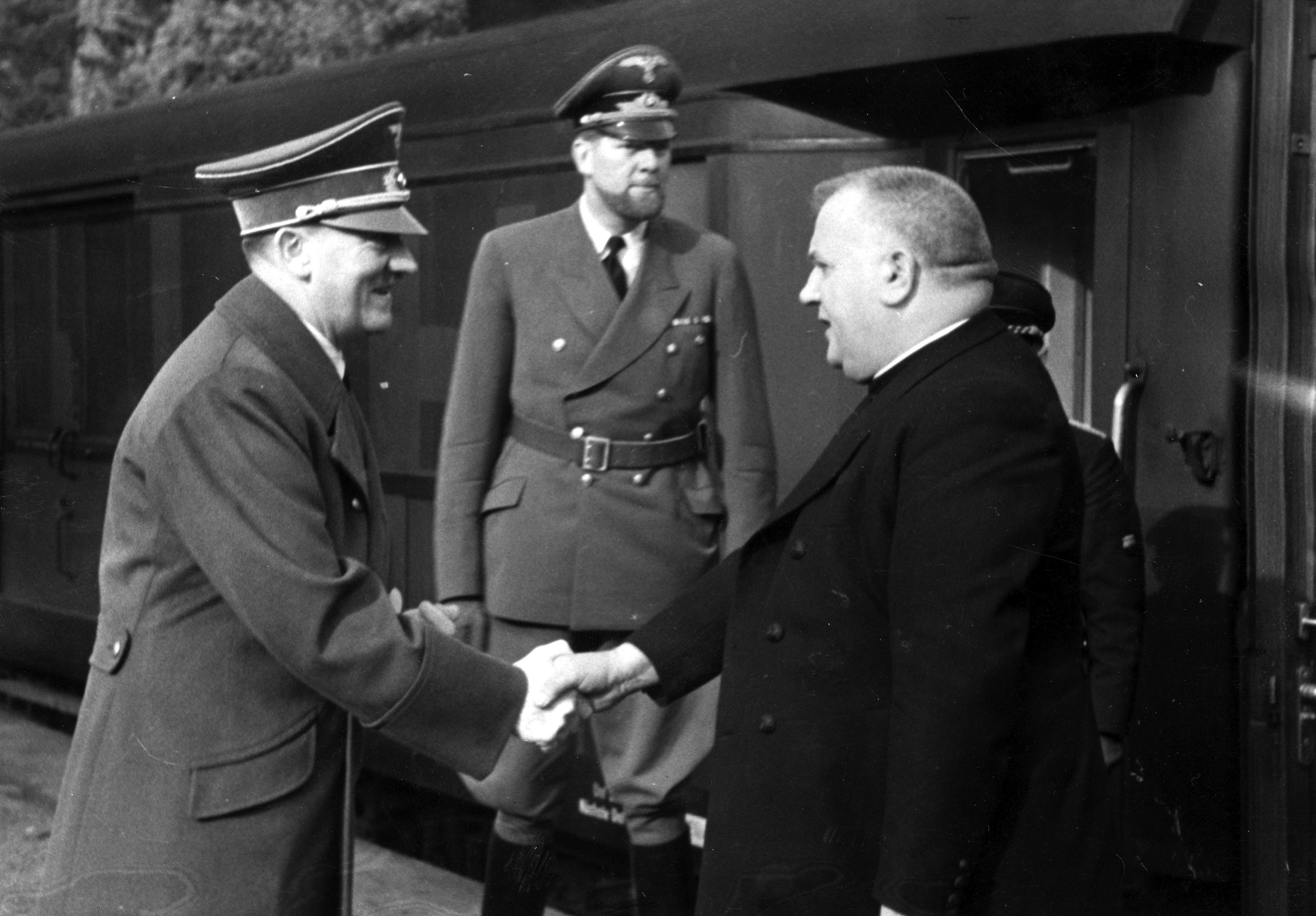
Adolf Hitler greeting Jozef Tiso, president of the (First) Slovak Republic, a client state of Nazi Germany during World War II, 1941

After the Munich Agreement and its Vienna Award, Nazi Germany threatened to annex part of Slovakia and allow the remaining regions to be partitioned by Hungary or Poland unless independence was declared. Thus, Slovakia seceded from Czecho-Slovakia in March 1939 and allied itself, as demanded by Germany, with Hitler's coalition. Secession had created the first Slovak state in history.

A one-party clerical fascist Slovak Republic governed by the far-right Hlinka's Slovak People's Party was led by President Jozef Tiso and Prime Minister Vojtech Tuka. The (First) Slovak Republic is primarily known for its collaboration with Nazi Germany, which included sending troops to the invasion of Poland in September 1939 and the Soviet Union in 1941. On 24 November 1940, Slovakia joined the Axis when its leaders signed the Tripartite Pact. The country was strongly influenced by Germany and gradually became a puppet regime in many respects.

Meanwhile, the Czechoslovak government-in-exile sought to reverse the Munich Agreement and the subsequent German occupation of Czechoslovakia and to return the Republic to its 1937 boundaries. The government operated from London and it was ultimately considered, by those countries that recognised it, the legitimate government for Czechoslovakia throughout the Second World War.

The local Jewish population was heavily persecuted. As part of the Holocaust in Slovakia, 75,000 Jews out of 80,000 who remained on Slovak territory after Hungary had seized southern regions were deported and taken to German death camps. Thousands of Jews, Gypsies and other politically undesirable people remained in Slovak forced labour camps in Sereď, Vyhne, and Nováky. Tiso, through the granting of presidential exceptions, allowed between 1,000 and 4,000 people crucial to the war economy to avoid deportations. Under Tiso's government and Hungarian occupation, the vast majority of Slovakia's pre-war Jewish population (between 75,000 and 105,000 individuals including those who perished from the occupied territory) were murdered. The Slovak state paid Germany 500 RM per every deported Jew for "retraining and accommodation" (a similar but smaller payment of 30 RM was paid by Croatia).

After it became clear that the Soviet Red Army was going to push the Nazis out of eastern and central Europe, an anti-Nazi resistance movement launched. Internal opposition to the fascist government's policies culminated in the Slovak National Uprising, near the end of summer 1944. A bloody German occupation and a guerilla war followed. Germans and their local collaborators completely destroyed 93 villages and massacred thousands of civilians, often hundreds at a time. Although the uprising was eventually suppressed, partisan resistance continued. The territory of Slovakia was liberated by Soviet and Romanian forces by the end of April 1945.

=== From Fascism to Communism (1945–1948) ===
As a result of the Yalta Conference in February 1945, Czechoslovakia came under the influence of the Soviet Union.

After World War II, Czechoslovakia was reconstituted and Jozef Tiso was executed in 1947 for collaboration with the Nazis. More than 80,000 Hungarians and 32,000 Germans were forced to leave Slovakia, in a series of population transfers initiated by the Allies at the Potsdam Conference. Out of about 130,000 Carpathian Germans in Slovakia in 1938, by 1947 only some 20,000 remained.

In February 1948, the Communist Party of Czechoslovakia, with Soviet backing, assumed undisputed control over the government of Czechoslovakia through a coup d'état and Czechoslovakia came under direct occupation of the Soviet Union and its Warsaw Pact. It became a puppet state of the Soviet Union, but it was never part of the Soviet Union and remained independent to a certain degree.

=== Communist party rule in Czechoslovakia (1948–1989) ===
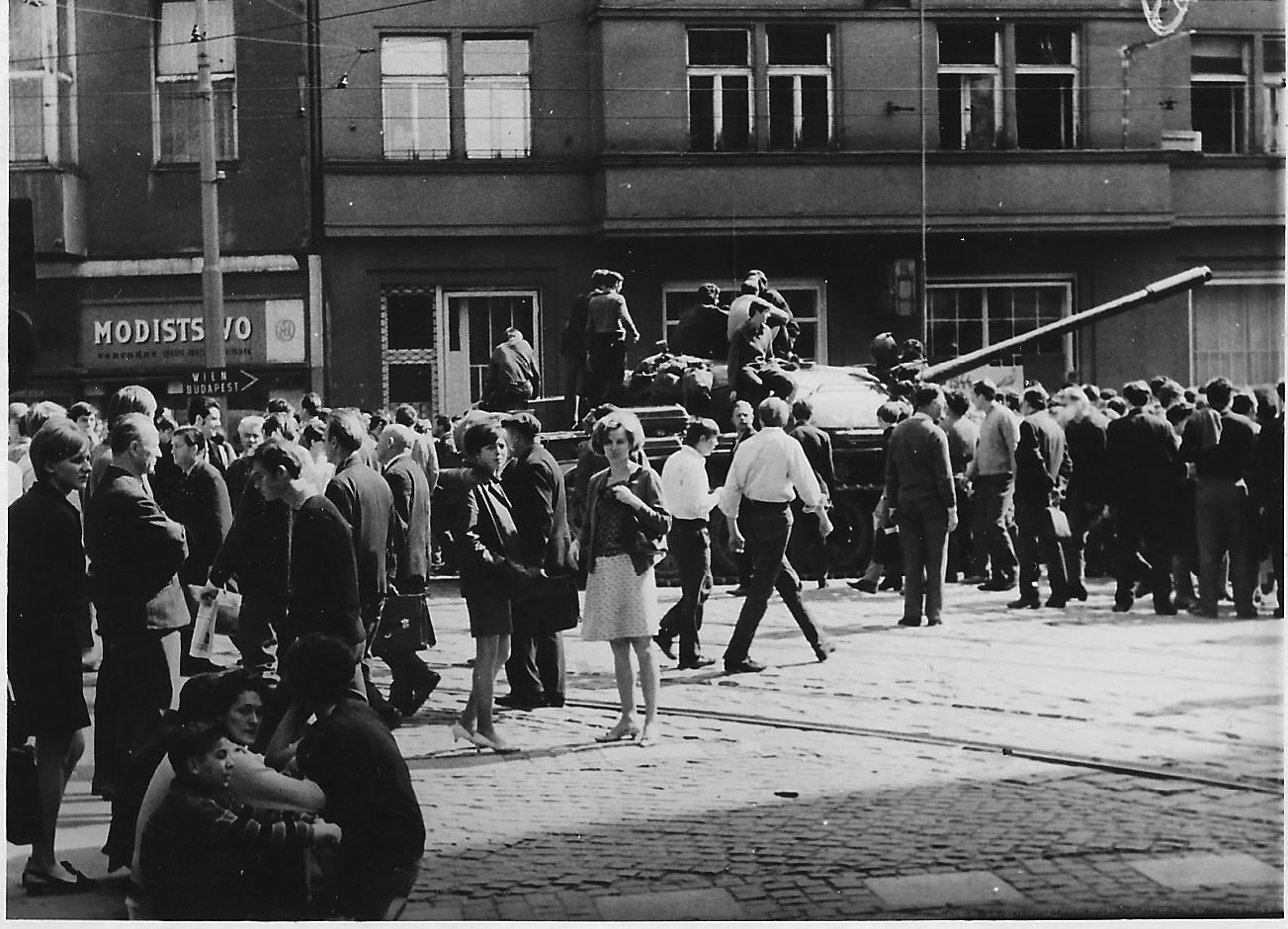
Soviet tank in Bratislava during the Warsaw Pact invasion of Czechoslovakia in 1968

Borders with the West were protected by the Iron Curtain. About 600 people, men, women, and children, were killed on the Czechoslovak border with Austria and West Germany between 1948 and 1989. 8,240 people went to forced labour camps in 1948–1953.

On 11 July 1960, the Constitution of Czechoslovakia was promulgated, changing the name of the country from the "Czechoslovak Republic" to the "Czechoslovak Socialist Republic".

In 1968, following the Prague Spring, the country was invaded by the Warsaw Pact forces (People's Republic of Bulgaria, People's Republic of Hungary, People's Republic of Poland, and Soviet Union, with the exception of Socialist Republic of Romania and People's Socialist Republic of Albania), ending a period of liberalisation under the leadership of Alexander Dubček. 137 Czechoslovak civilians were killed and 500 seriously wounded during the invasion.

In 1969, Czechoslovakia became a federation of the Czech Socialist Republic and the Slovak Socialist Republic within the Czechoslovak Socialist Republic.

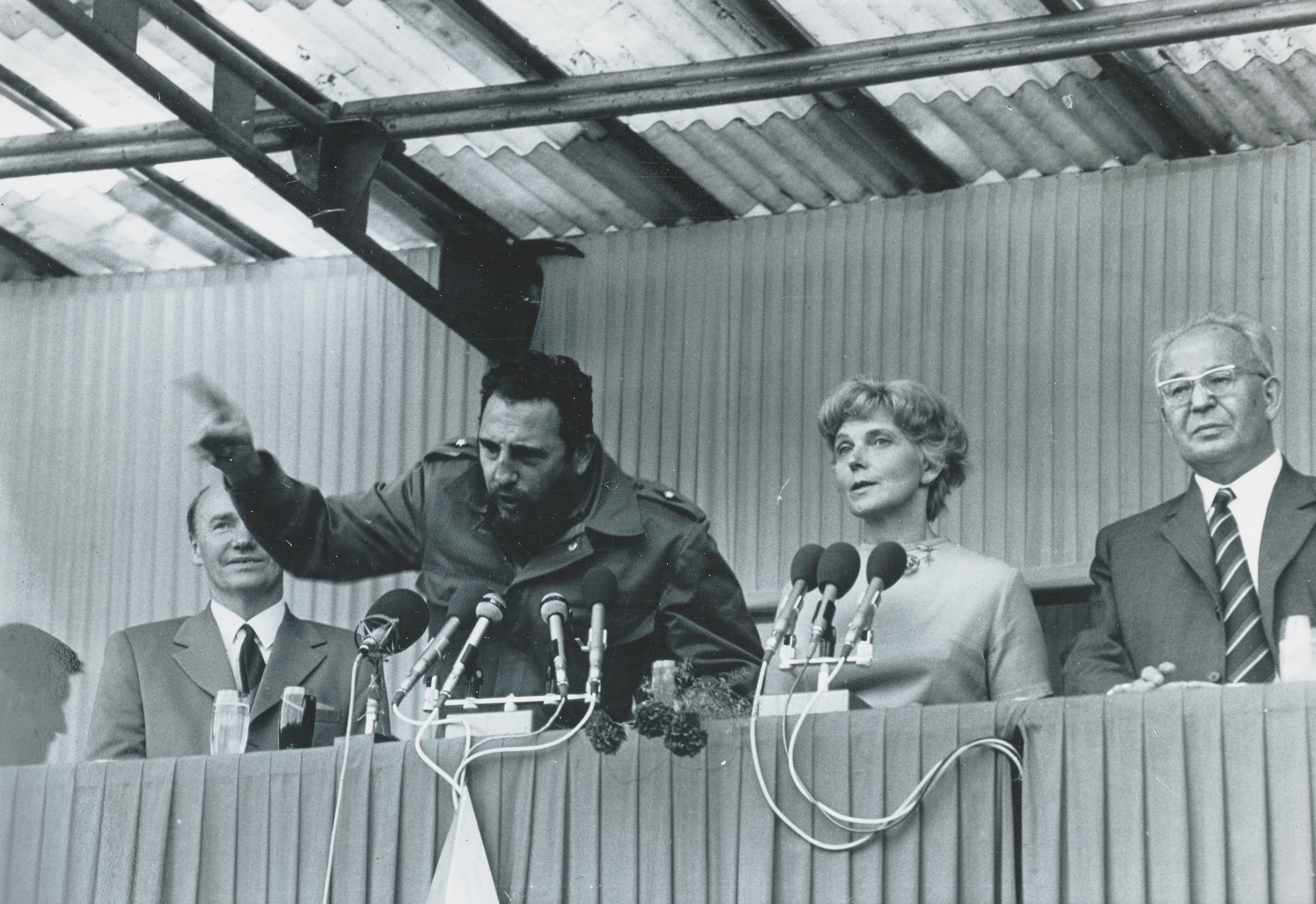
Czechoslovak communist leader Gustáv Husák (right) with Fidel Castro during his state visit of Czechoslovakia, 1972

Czechoslovakia was allied with communist regimes worldwide. As one of the first countries in the world acknowledged Kim Il-sung's Democratic People's Republic of Korea. After the beginning of the Korean War, Czechoslovakia protested against measures taken by the Security Council. Czechoslovak communist leaders considered the intervention against North Korean aggression illegal. During summer 1950, many resolutions against "American imperialism" were sent to the United Nations from Czechoslovakia. During the Korean War in 1952, Czechoslovakia sent a military hospital with two hospital teams consisting of 58 people to North Korea.

When Fidel Castro took power after the Cuban Revolution in 1959, Czechoslovakia opened an embassy in Cuba and developed mutual relations. In August 1968, Castro denounced the Prague Spring as led by a "fascist reactionary rabble" and praised the Soviet invasion of Czechoslovakia. During the Vietnam War, Czechoslovakia sent significant aid to North Vietnam. The Czechoslovak government created committees which sought to not only promote and establish peace, but also to promote victory for Viet Cong and Vietnam People's Army forces. Czech-made equipment and military aid would increase significantly following the Prague Spring. Czechoslovakia continued to send tens of thousands of Czech-made rifles as well as mortar and artillery throughout the war.

=== From Communism to Democracy (1989–1992) ===
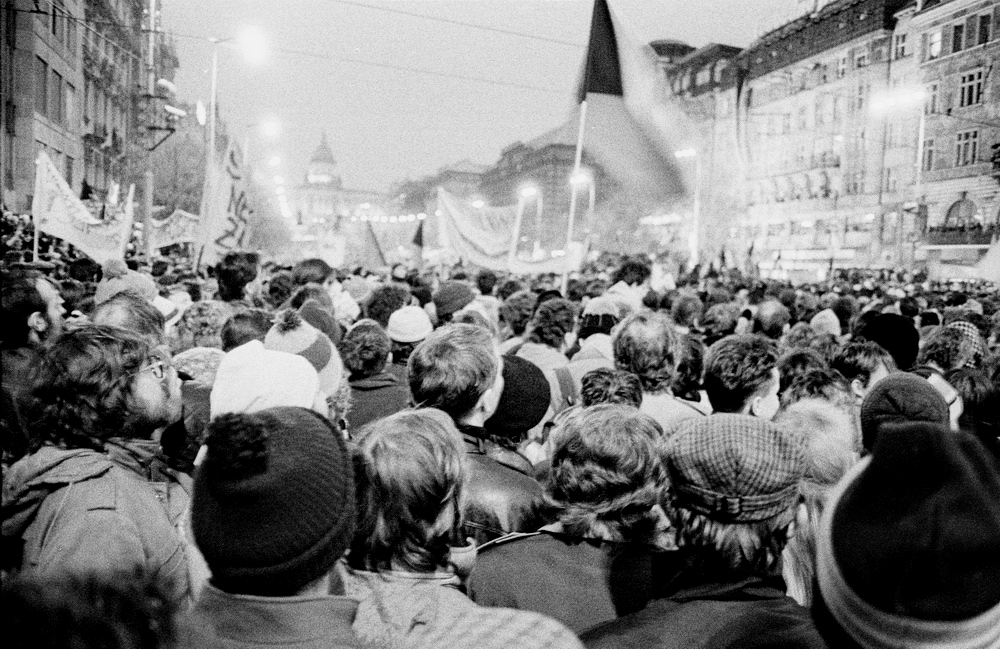
The Velvet Revolution ended 41 years of authoritarian communist rule in Czechoslovakia in 1989.

The end of Communist rule in Czechoslovakia in 1989, during the peaceful Velvet Revolution, was followed once again by the country's dissolution, this time into two successor states. Czechoslovak Socialist Republic renamed as Czech and Slovak Federative Republic, the word "socialist" was dropped in the names of the two republics within the federation, the Slovak Socialist Republic renamed as Slovak Republic.

On 17 July 1992, Slovakia, led by Prime Minister Vladimír Mečiar, declared itself a sovereign state, meaning that its laws took precedence over those of the federal government. Throughout the autumn of 1992, Vladimír Mečiar and Czech Prime Minister Václav Klaus negotiated the details for disbanding the federation. In November, the federal parliament voted to dissolve the country officially on 31 December 1992.

=== Slovak independence (since 1993) ===
==== 1990s ====
The Slovak Republic and the Czech Republic went their separate ways on 1 January 1993, an event sometimes called the Velvet Divorce, after 74 years of joint existence disrupted only by World War II. Slovakia has, nevertheless, remained a close partner with the Czech Republic; the two countries are close European allies and both co-operate with Hungary and Poland in the Visegrád Group. The first president of the Slovak Republic became Michal Kováč, elected by the National Council of Slovakia in February 1993. Slovakia became a member of the United Nations on 19 January 1993, on 31 March 1993 ratified the UNESCO World Heritage Convention, making its historical sites eligible for inclusion on the UNESCO list and on 15 April 1993 joined GATT (current World Trade Organization).

After the fall of communism and the dissolution of Czechoslovakia, the country was unprepared for organised crime. Crime rates in Slovakia soared in the 1990s, the first post-communist gangsters emerged and mafia became the major problem in the country. Most of the law enforcement officers, prosecutors, and judges had no experience of investigating, trying, or sentencing criminals. Many officials lacked even basic knowledge of the leading criminal operators in their communities. Between 1994–1998, during the government of Prime Minister Vladimír Mečiar, organised crime became well established and it penetrated the highest political positions. One of the major crime events was kidnapping of Slovak president's son Michal Kováč Jr. in 1995, organised by Slovak intelligence service and the government of Vladimír Mečiar. Processes of privatization in Slovakia began, often criticized for lack of transparency and corruption. Hundreds of state assets came into private hands to only a selected group of businessmen. In the 1990s, Slovakia had central Europe's worst-performing economy, marked by high unemployment rates and inflation with least democratic government. Madeleine Albright, the U.S. secretary of state, referred to it as "a black hole in the heart of Europe". This time period in Slovakia is also known as "Wild 90s" ("Divoké 90.roky"). Since March 1998, the country was 14 months without a head of state, when the National Council of Slovakia multiple times failed to elect the new president, which led to the introduction of a direct presidential election in 1999.

After the 1998 parliamentary election, Mikuláš Dzurinda went on to replace Vladimír Mečiar as prime minister, and during two successive governments between 1998–2006, relaunched the transformation processes that had stalled under Mečiar. The country embarked on a reformist course that saw the introduction of a flat tax, liberalisation of the labour market, deregulation of business, and partial privatization of social security. Government of Mikuláš Dzurinda led Slovakia into OECD, NATO and the European Union. In 1999, the second president of Slovakia became Rudolf Schuster, first directly-elected president.

==== 2000s ====
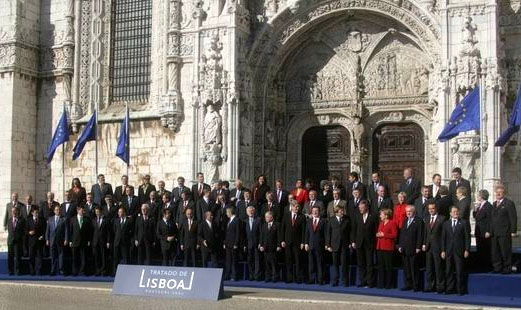
Slovakia became a member of the European Union in 2004 and signed the Lisbon Treaty in 2007.

Slovakia became a member of OECD on 14 December 2000, NATO on 29 March 2004 and of the European Union on 1 May 2004. The country used to be dubbed the "Tatra Tiger" in the 2000s as achieved, on average, roughly 6% per capita GDP growth each year from 2000 to 2008. Ivan Gašparovič became the third president of Slovakia in 2004 and in 2009 became the first and the only Slovak re-elected president.

In 2006, Robert Fico became prime minister, during his first government, Slovakia joined the Schengen area on 21 December 2007, allowing visa free travel and on 1 January 2009 adopted the Euro as its national currency at 30.1260 korunas to the euro. The Slovak economy was involved in a major slowdown during the 2008 financial crisis, experiencing the deepest recession in history. At the beginning of 2009, Slovakia faced energy crisis and declared a state of emergency, after Russia cut gas supplies to Europe via Ukrainian pipelines as part of a price dispute with Ukraine.

==== 2010s ====
Between 2010–2012, Slovak government was led by first female prime minister Iveta Radičová. Her government lasted only two years, Radičová combined the vote on the strengthening of the European Financial Stability Facility – a key anti-crisis mechanism in the eurozone – with a vote of confidence for her cabinet. Slovak parliament rejected the EFSF, which led to the collapse of the government.

In 2012, Robert Fico became second time Prime Minister when his political party Direction – Social Democracy won election and collected 83 of 150 seats in National Council, becoming the first single party to win a clear majority in the Slovak parliament since the fall of communism. In 2014, Andrej Kiska became the fourth President of Slovakia. For the first time was elected as president entrepreneur and first-time politician. International crisis impacted Slovak politics and quickly started dominating the country's political life and media coverage, such as Annexation of Crimea by the Russian Federation in neighbouring Ukraine in 2014 or European migrant crisis in 2015.

After the parliamentary election in 2016, Robert Fico became third time prime minister, making him longest-serving prime minister in Slovak history, if the years are counted cumulatively. Third term of Fico's government was characterised by social and political turmoil. On 21 February 2018, young Slovak investigative journalist Ján Kuciak and his fiancée, were killed in their home in Veľká Mača. Thousands of people protested in streets across Slovakia for independent investigation of journalist's murder and a 'trustworthy' government in largest demonstrations in the country since the Velvet Revolution. Due to protests, Robert Fico resigned, and the government continued under a new prime minister Peter Pellegrini. In 2019, Zuzana Čaputová became the fifth President of Slovakia, first female president.

==== 2020s ====
After the parliamentary election in 2020, Igor Matovič became the new prime minister of Slovakia. Matovič and his government, with little to no previous government experience, was dealing with the COVID-19 pandemic and COVID-19 recession, during which more than 21,000 people died in Slovakia between 2020–2023, the worst death toll in the country since the end of World War II. Due to the COVID-19 pandemic, the Slovak economy faced the worst economic crisis since the 2008 financial crisis and fell into recession. At the beginning of 2021, Matovič signed an agreement to acquire 2 million doses of Russia's Sputnik V COVID-19 vaccine, which has not been cleared by European Union regulators. Matovič orchestrated the deal despite disagreement among his coalition partners, which led to a government crisis and his resignation. The government continued under a new prime minister Eduard Heger. Heger and his government faced many challenges, such as the ongoing COVID-19 pandemic, Russian invasion in neighbouring Ukraine, Ukrainian refugee crisis, Global energy crisis and Inflation surge. After a strong economic recovery in 2021, growth slowed down markedly in 2022 and 2023 as a result of the consequences of the Russian invasion of Ukraine, notably the subsequent EU sanctions on Russia and Global energy crisis. Slovakia became one of Ukraine's largest donors of military aid during Heger's government in 2022 and 2023. Government crisis in Slovakia continued with various disputes in the coalition. At the end of 2022, Heger's government collapsed, after a lost no-confidence vote in parliament. In 2023, in the interim before the next election, President Zuzana Čaputová appointed the first technocrat government in Slovak history and Ľudovít Ódor became the new prime minister for only six months, the third prime minister of Slovakia in three years.

After the parliamentary election in 2023, Robert Fico became for the fourth time prime minister. The new government halted military aid to Ukraine, while still providing humanitarian aid and electricity supplies. On 15 May 2024, Prime Minister Robert Fico was shot several times and wounded in an assassination attempt. The suspect stated during interrogation that he acted primarily because of the Fico government's opposition to military assistance to Ukraine. In 2024, Peter Pellegrini became the sixth President of Slovakia. Pellegrini is the first Slovak politician to have held all three highest constitutional posts (President, Prime Minister and Speaker of Parliament) in the country. Fourth term of Fico's government is characterized by political instability with fragile coalition, worsening relations with European Union, diplomatic disputes with the closest ally Czech Republic and growing Russian influence. Pro-Russia policies of Slovak government, questioning Slovakia's future in the European Union and NATO, criticism of Ukrainian president Volodymyr Zelenskyy and Fico's good relationship with Russian president Vladimir Putin, led to widespread demonstrations across the country. Slovakia fell significantly in the media freedom ranking and corruption ranking. Crisis of democratic society was followed by economic decline, underlined by downgrade rating from credit rating agency Moody's and later Standard & Poor's. In 2025, the government amended constitution to recognize only two genders (male and female), sparking human rights concerns. Bilateral and energy tensions with Ukraine escalated sharply during the 2025 gas dispute and the 2026 Druzhba pipeline crisis.

== Geography ==
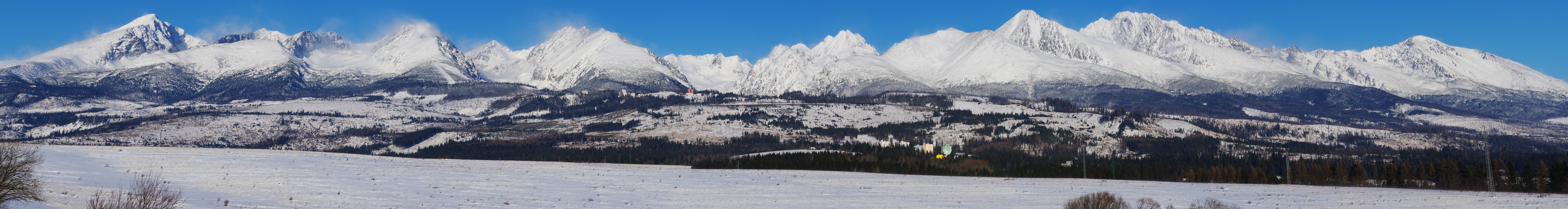
Panorama of the High Tatras

Slovakia lies between latitudes 47° and 50° N, and longitudes 16° and 23° E. The Slovak landscape is noted primarily for its mountainous nature, with the Carpathian Mountains extending across most of the northern half of the country. Among these mountain ranges are the high peaks of the Fatra-Tatra Area (including Tatra Mountains, Greater Fatra and Lesser Fatra), Slovak Ore Mountains, Slovak Central Mountains or Beskids. The largest lowland is the fertile Danubian Lowland in the southwest, followed by the Eastern Slovak Lowland in the southeast. Forests cover 41% of Slovak land surface.

=== Tatra mountains ===
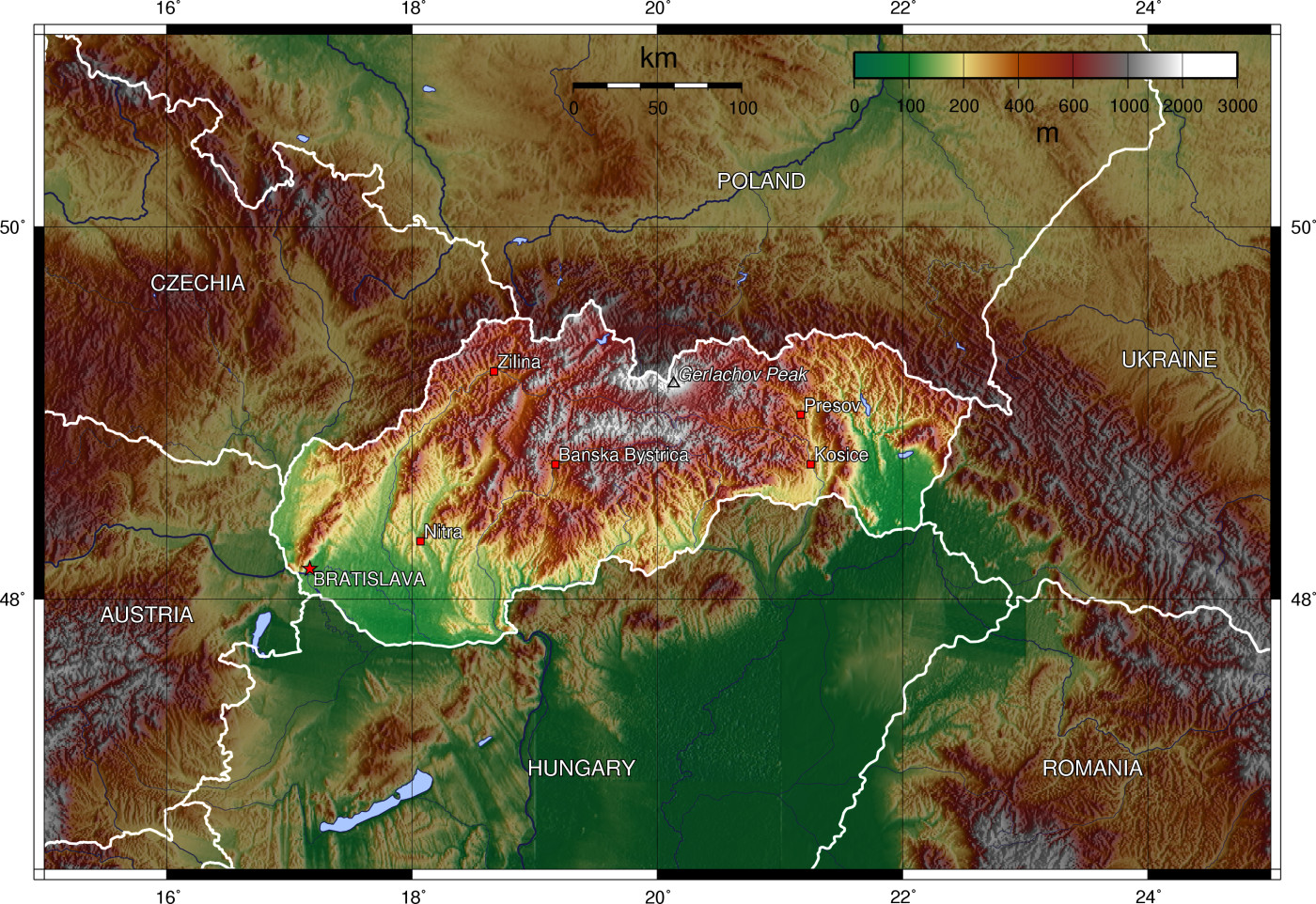
A topographical map of Slovakia

The Tatra Mountains, with 29 peaks higher than 2,500 metres (8,202 feet) AMSL, are the highest mountain range in the Carpathian Mountains. The Tatras occupy an area of 750 km^{2} (290 sq mi), of which the greater part 600 km^{2} (230 sq mi) lies in Slovakia. They are divided into several parts.

To the north, close to the Polish border, are the High Tatras which are a popular hiking and skiing destination and home to many scenic lakes and valleys as well as the highest point in Slovakia, the Gerlachovský štít at 2,655 metres (8,711 ft) and the country's highly symbolic mountain Kriváň. To the west are the Western Tatras with their highest peak of Bystrá at 2,248 metres (7,375 ft) and to the east are the Belianske Tatras, smallest by area.

Separated from the Tatras proper by the valley of the Váh river are the Low Tatras, with their highest peak of Ďumbier at 2,043 metres (6,703 ft).

The Tatra mountain range is represented as one of the three hills on the coat of arms of Slovakia.

=== National parks ===
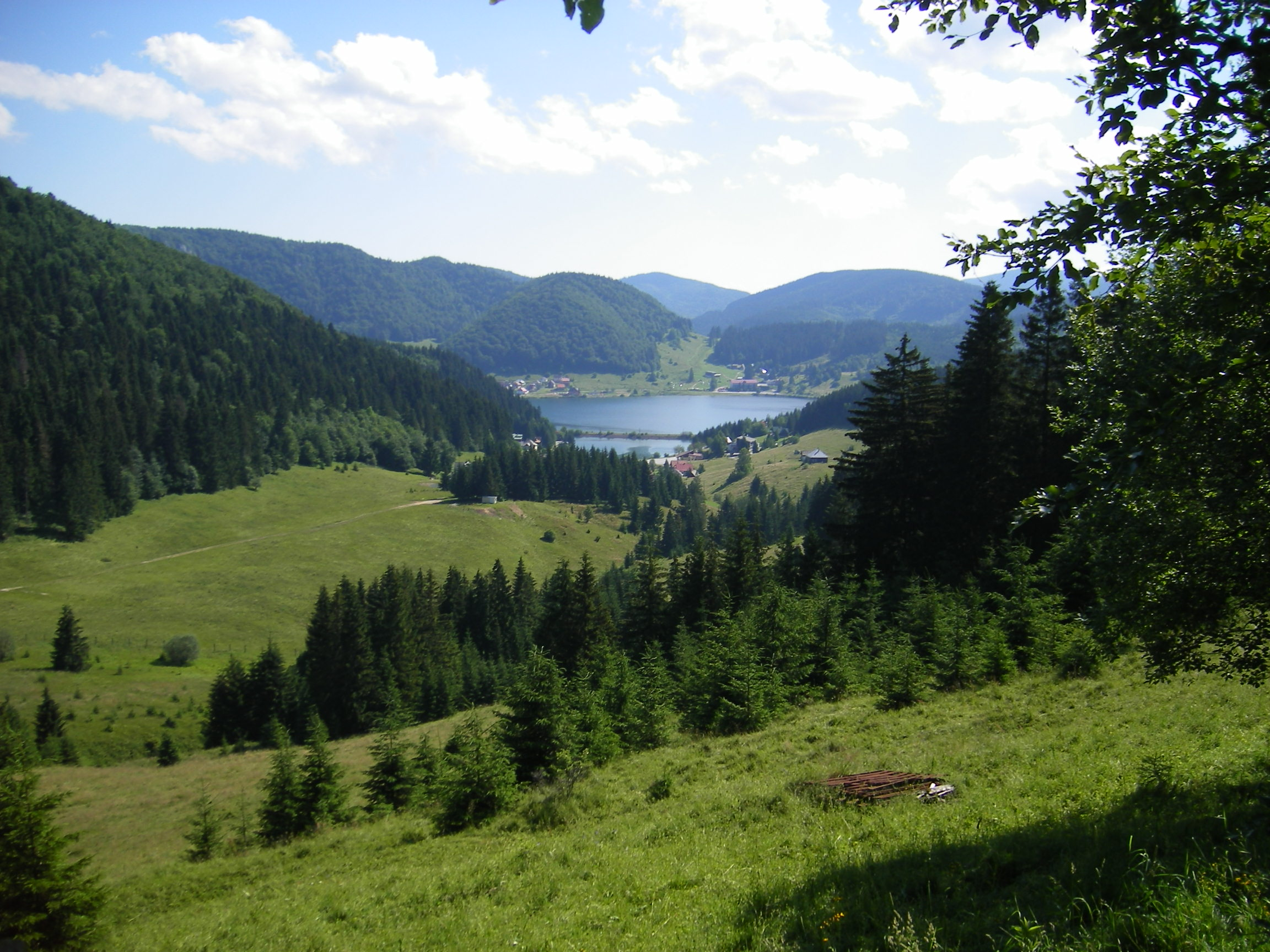
Slovak Paradise National Park

There are nine national parks in Slovakia, covering 6.5% of the Slovak land surface. These parks are: Tatra National Park, Low Tatras National Park, Veľká Fatra National Park, Slovak Karst National Park, Poloniny National Park, Malá Fatra National Park, Muránska planina National Park, Slovak Paradise National Park and Pieniny National Park.

=== Caves ===
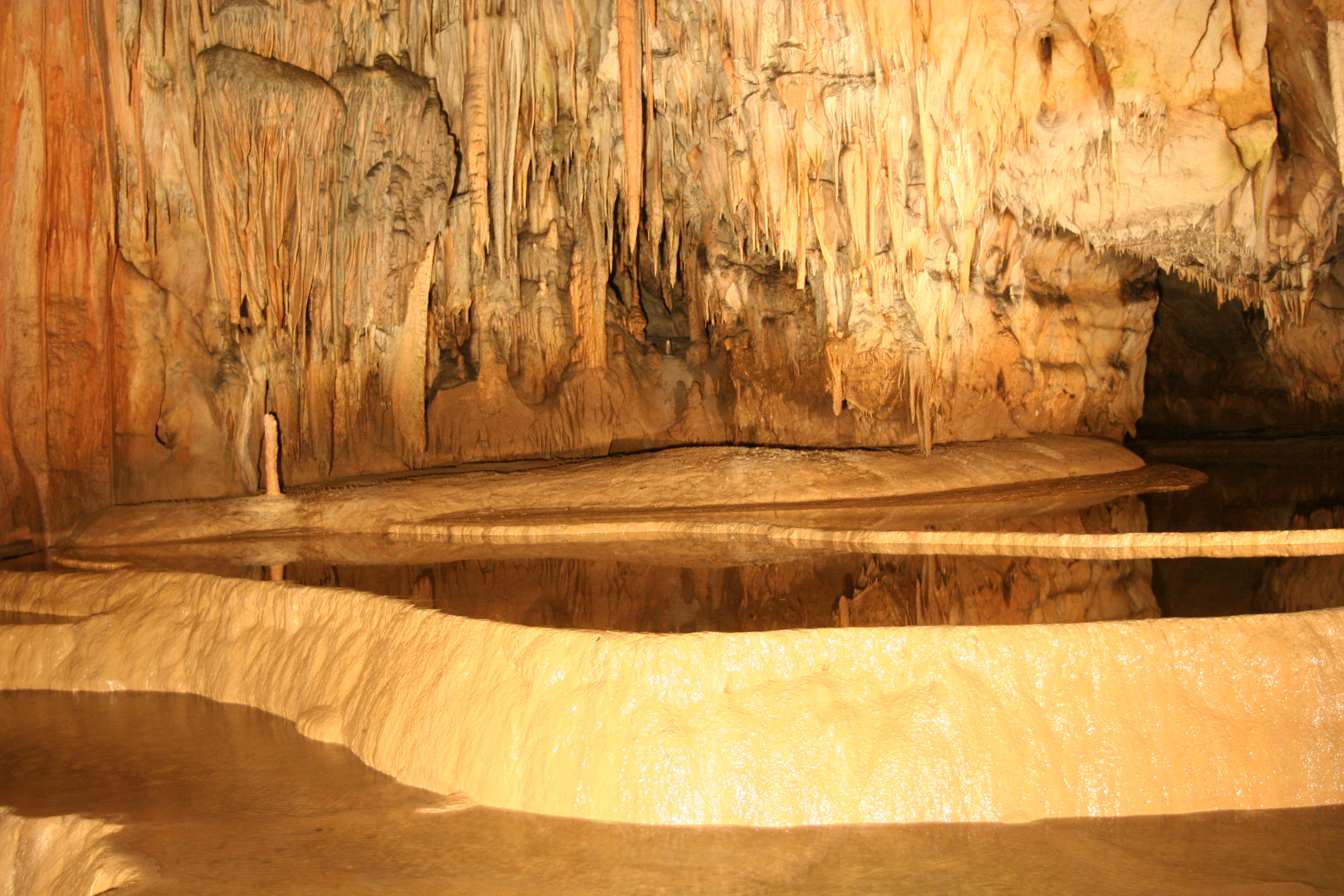
Domica Cave

Slovakia has hundreds of caves and caverns under its mountains, of which 30 are open to the public. Most of the caves have stalagmites rising from the ground and stalactites hanging from above.

There are currently five Slovak caves under UNESCO's World Heritage Site status: Dobšiná Ice Cave, Domica, Gombasek Cave, Jasovská Cave and Ochtinská Aragonite Cave. Other caves open to the public include Belianska Cave, Demänovská Cave of Liberty, Demänovská Ice Cave or Bystrianska Cave.

=== Rivers ===
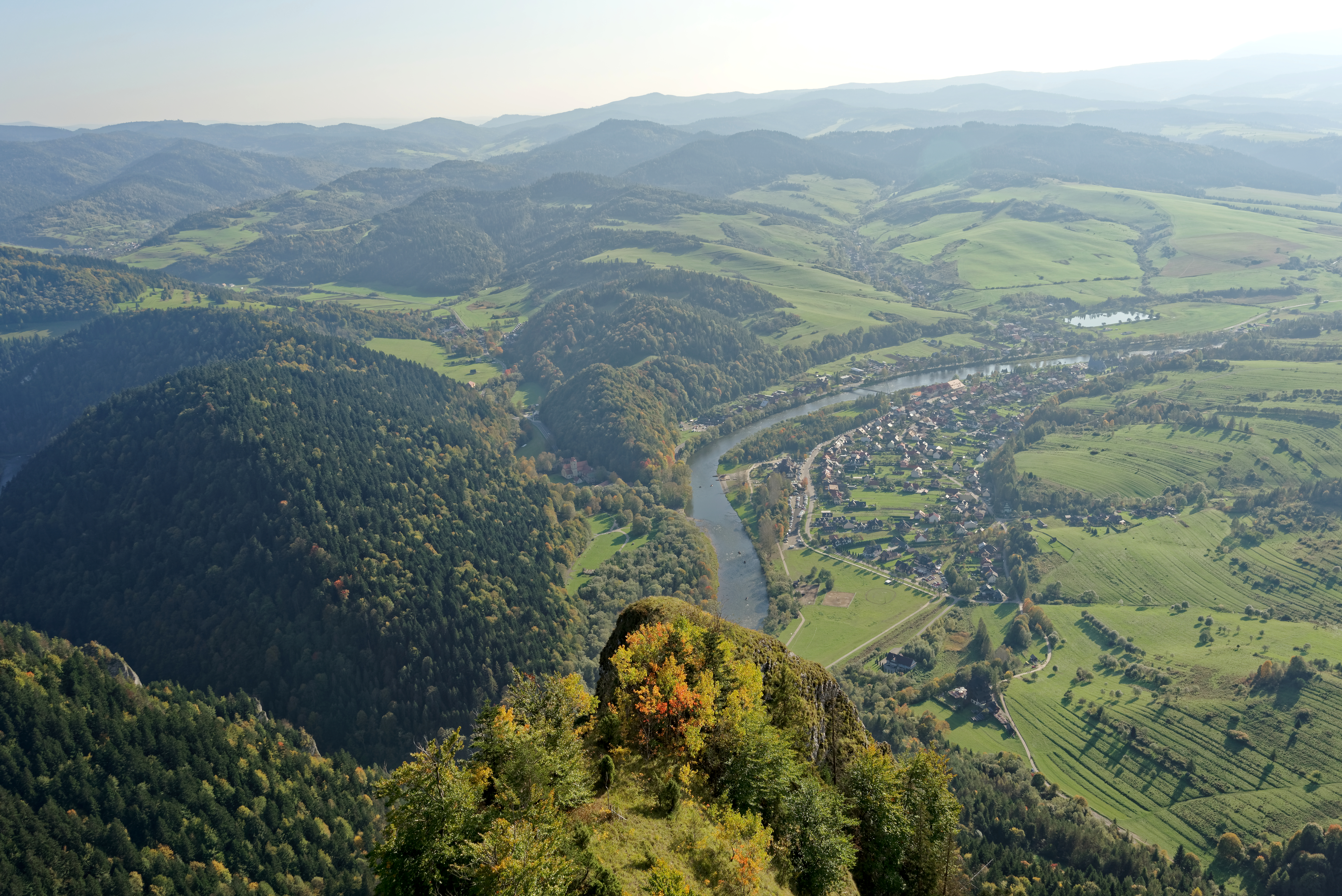
Dunajec river

Most of the rivers arise in the Slovak mountains. Some only pass through Slovakia, while others make a natural border with surrounding countries (more than 620 kilometres [390 mi]). For example, the Dunajec (17 kilometres [11 mi]) to the north, the Danube (172 kilometres [107 mi]) to the south or the Morava (119 kilometres [74 mi]) to the West. The total length of the rivers on Slovak territory is 49,774 kilometres (30,928 mi).

The longest river in Slovakia is the Váh (403 kilometres [250 mi]), the shortest is the Čierna voda. Other important and large rivers are the Myjava, the Nitra (197 kilometres [122 mi]), the Orava, the Hron (298 kilometres [185 mi]), the Hornád (193 kilometres [120 mi]), the Slaná (110 kilometres [68 mi]), the Ipeľ (232 kilometres [144 mi], forming the border with Hungary), the Bodrog, the Laborec, the Latorica and the Ondava.

The biggest volume of discharge in Slovak rivers is during spring, when the snow melts from the mountains. The only exception is the Danube, whose discharge is the greatest during summer when the snow melts in the Alps. The Danube is the largest river that flows through Slovakia.

=== Climate ===
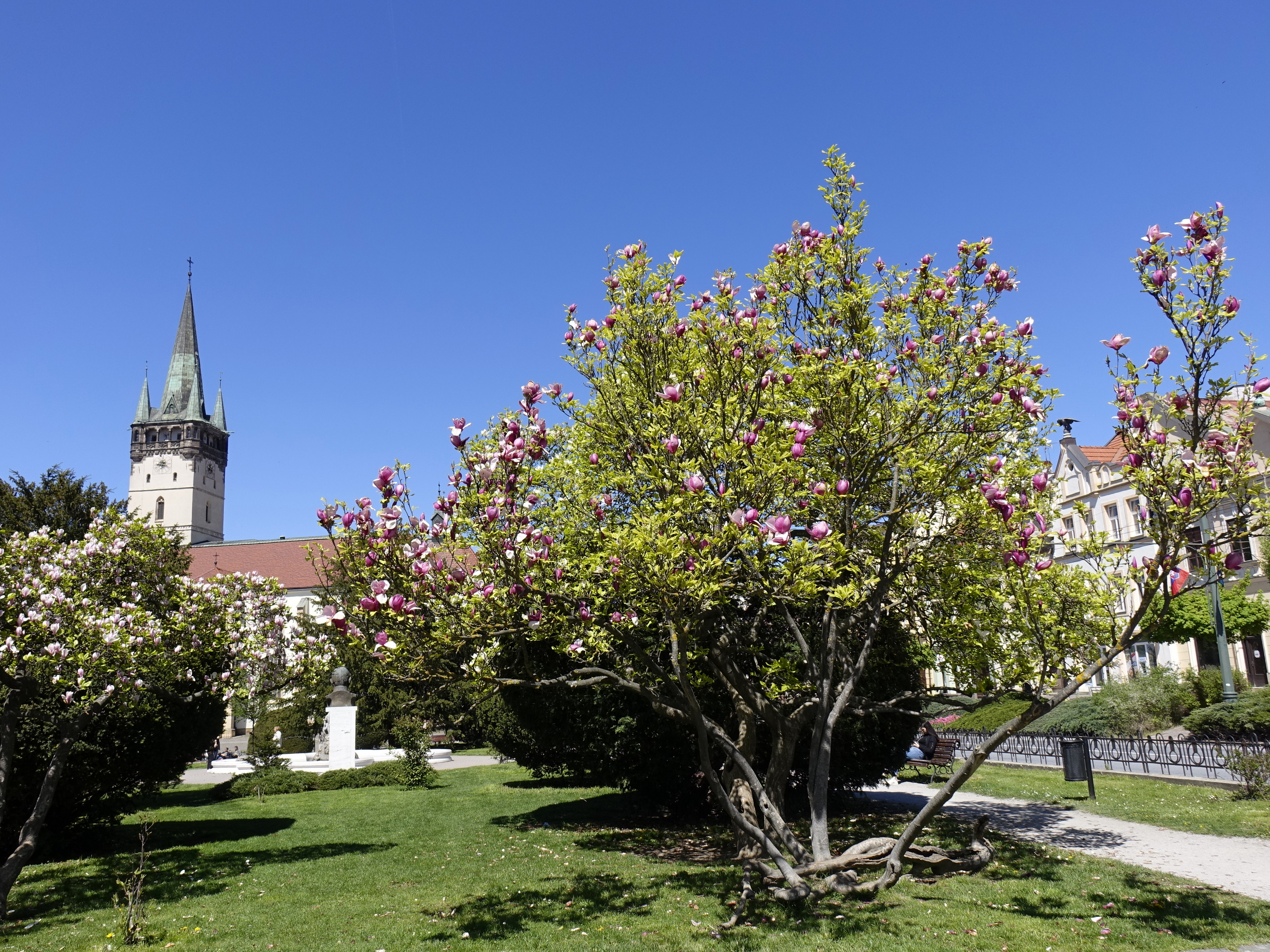
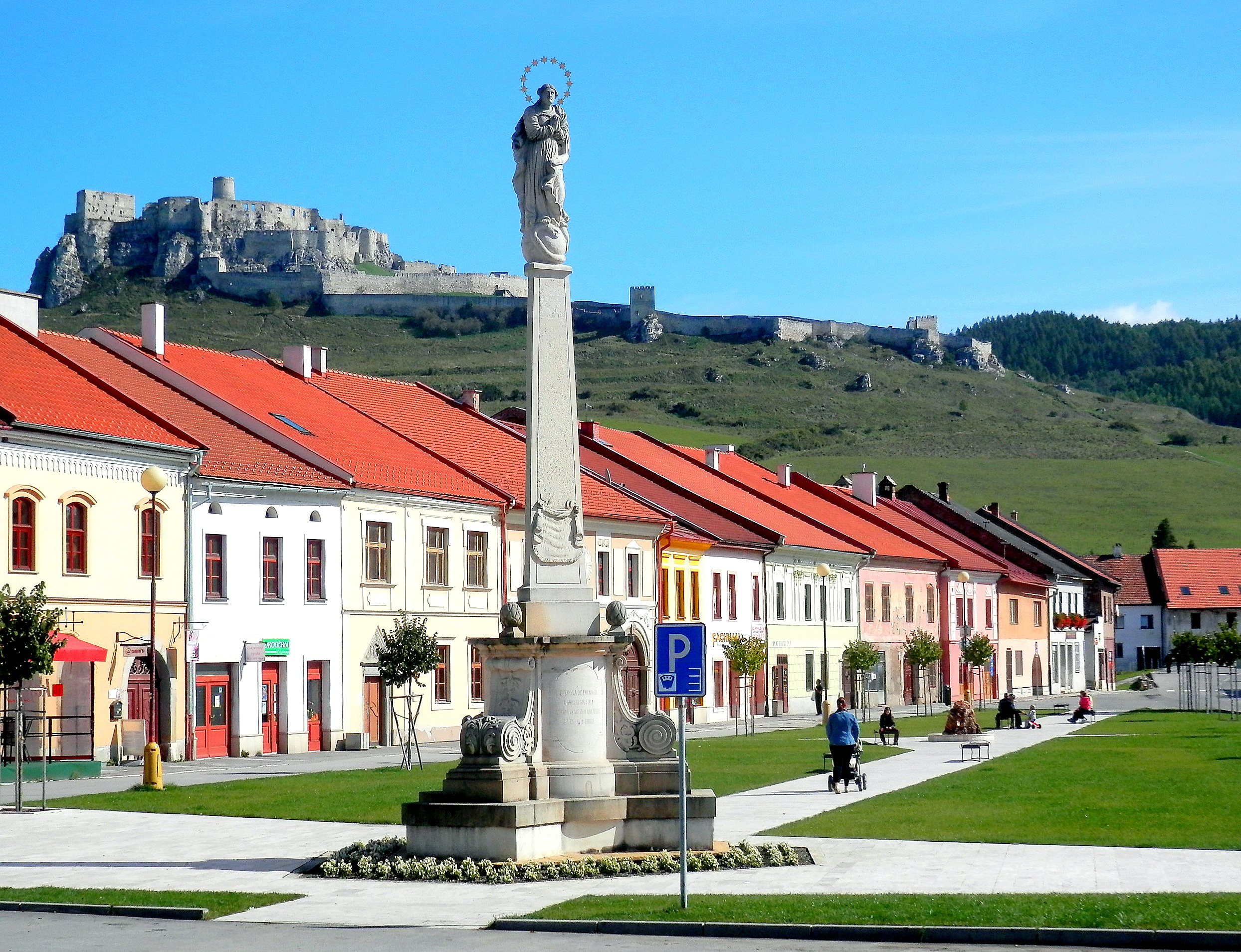
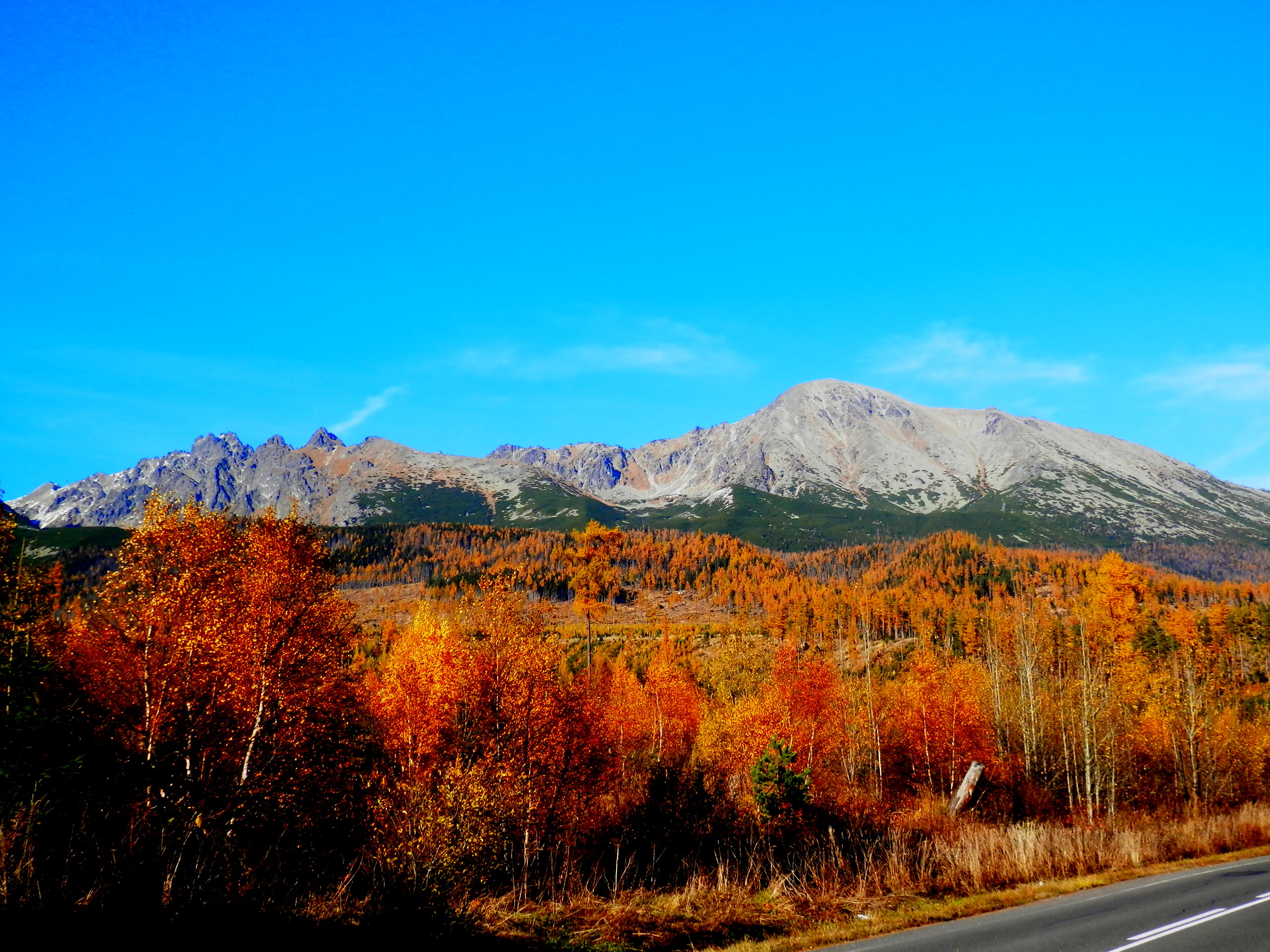
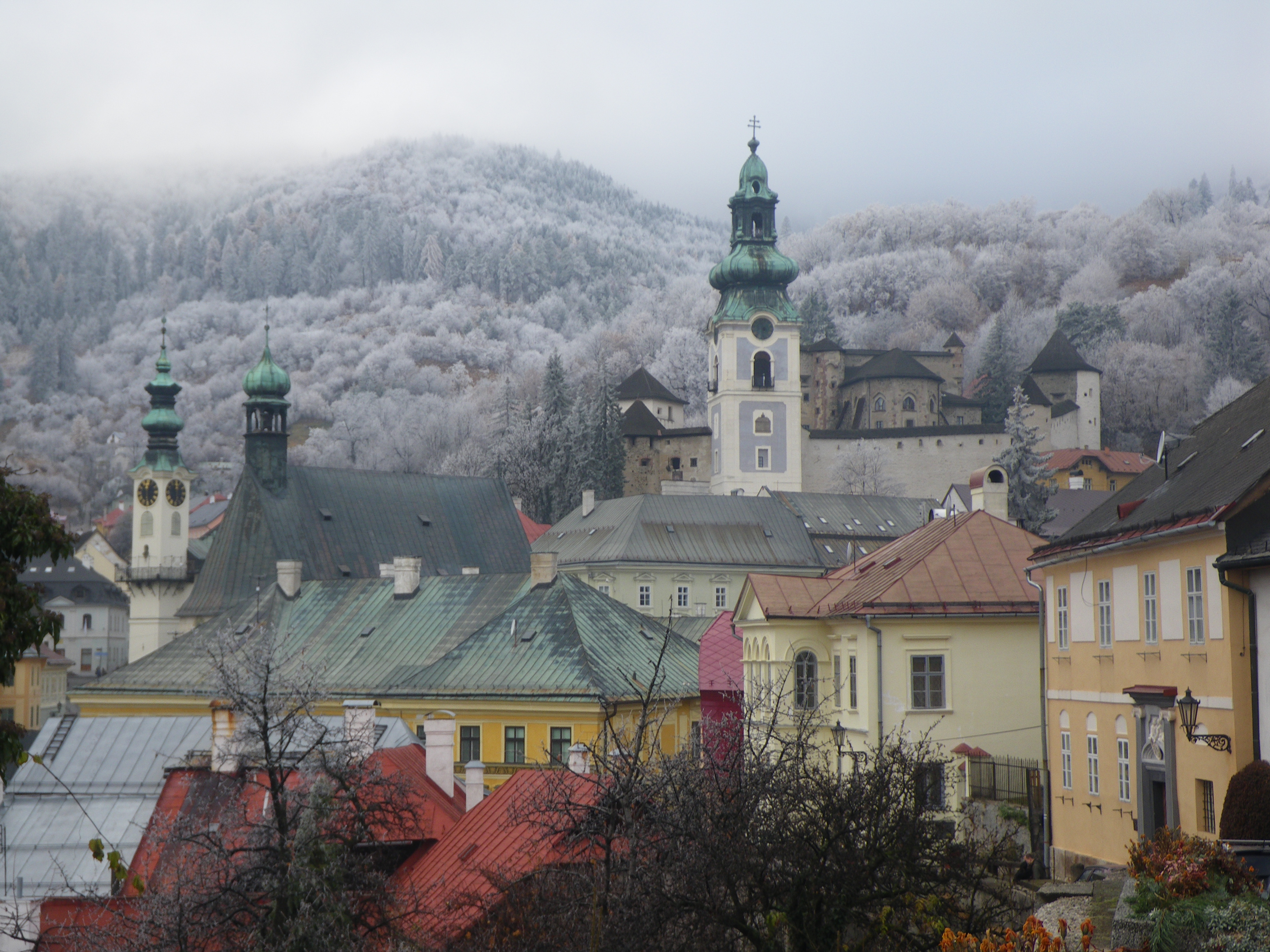
Four seasons in Slovakia: spring in Prešov, summer in Spišské Podhradie, autumn in High Tatras, winter in Banská Štiavnica (the town is a UNESCO World Heritage Site)

The Slovak climate lies between the temperate and continental climate zones with relatively warm summers and cold, cloudy and humid winters. Temperature extremes are between −41.0 and 41.3 °C (−41.8 and 106.3 °F) although temperatures below −30 °C (−22 °F) are rare. The weather differs from the mountainous north to the plains in the south.

The warmest region is Bratislava and Southern Slovakia where the temperatures may reach 30 °C (86 °F) in summer, occasionally up to 41 °C (106 °F). During night, the temperatures drop to 20 °C (68 °F). The daily temperatures in winter average in the range of −5 °C (23 °F) to 10 °C (50 °F). During night it may be freezing, but usually not below −10 °C (14 °F).

The dry continental air brings in the summer heat and winter frosts. In contrast, oceanic air brings rainfalls and reduces summer temperatures. In the lowlands and valleys, there is often fog, especially in winter.

Spring starts on the March equinox, around 20 March, and is characterised by colder weather with an average daily temperature of 9 °C (48 °F) in the first weeks and about 14 °C (57 °F) in May and 17 °C (63 °F) in June. In Slovakia, the weather and climate in the spring are very unstable.

Summer starts on the June solstice, around 20–21 June, and is usually characterised by hot weather with daily temperatures exceeding 30 °C (86 °F). July is the warmest month with temperatures up to about 37 to 40 °C (99 to 104 °F), especially in regions of southern Slovakia. Showers or thunderstorms may occur because of the summer monsoon called Medardova kvapka (Medard drop – 40 days of rain). Summer in Northern Slovakia is usually mild with temperatures around 25 °C (77 °F) (less in the mountains).

Autumn in Slovakia starts on the September equinox, around 22–23 September, and is mostly characterised by wet weather and wind, although the first weeks can be very warm and sunny. The average temperature in September is around 14 °C (57 °F), in November to 3 °C (37 °F). Late September and early October is a dry and sunny time of year (so-called Indian summer).

Winter starts on the December solstice, around 21–22 December, with temperatures around −5 to −10 °C (23 to 14 °F). In December and January, it is usually snowing, these are the coldest months of the year. At lower altitudes, snow does not stay the whole winter, it changes into the thaw and frost. Winters are colder in the mountains, where the snow usually lasts until March or April and the night temperatures fall to −20 °C (−4 °F) and colder.

=== Biodiversity ===
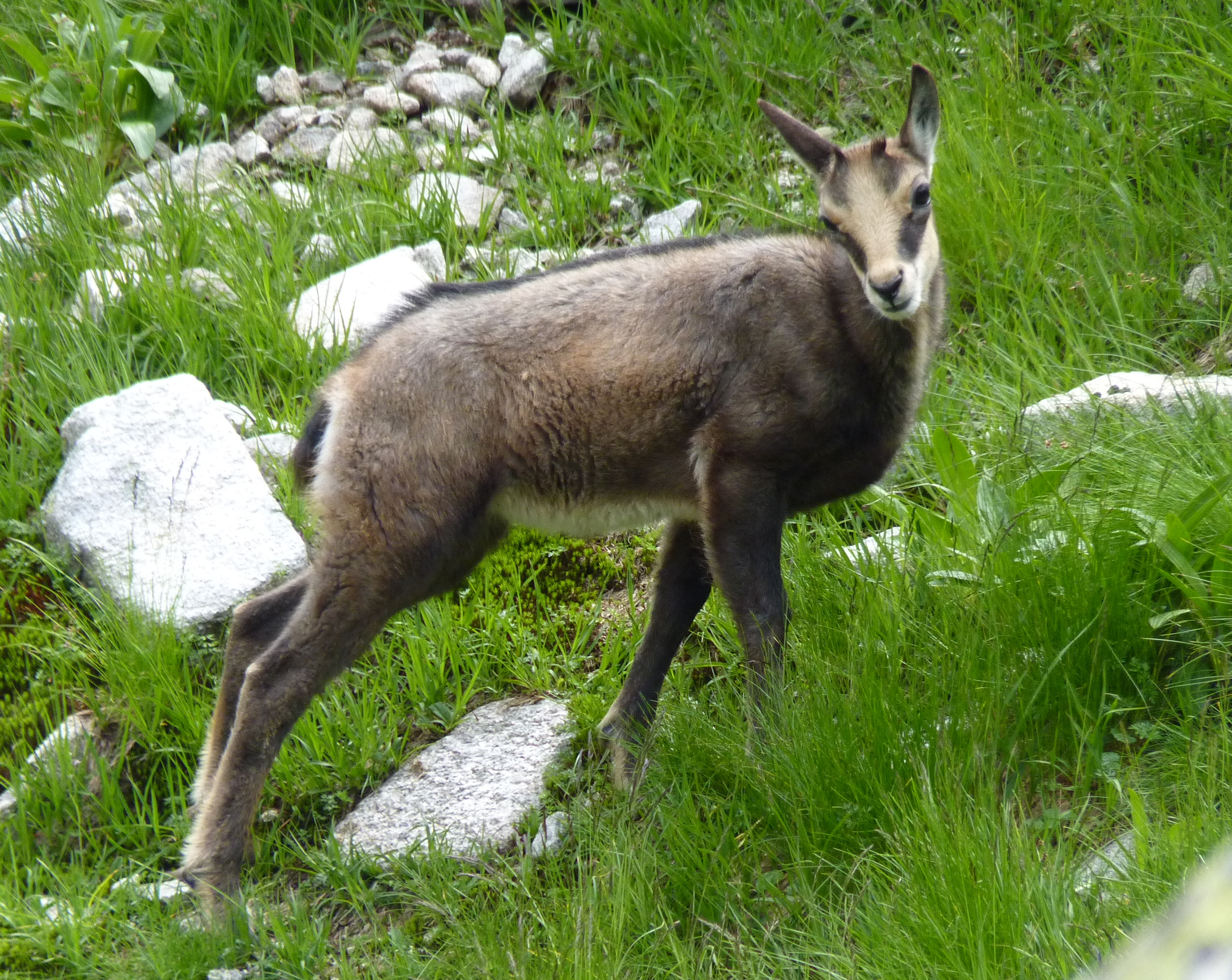
Rupicapra rupicapra tatrica in the Tatra Mountains

Slovakia signed the Rio Convention on Biological Diversity on 19 May 1993, and became a party to the convention on 25 August 1994. It has subsequently produced a National Biodiversity Strategy and Action Plan, which was received by the convention on 2 November 1998.

The biodiversity of Slovakia comprises animals (such as annelids, arthropods, molluscs, nematodes and vertebrates), fungi (Ascomycota, Basidiomycota, Chytridiomycota, Glomeromycota and Zygomycota), micro-organisms (including Mycetozoa), and plants. The geographical position of Slovakia determines the richness of the diversity of fauna and flora. More than 11,000 plant species have been described throughout its territory, nearly 29,000 animal species and over 1,000 species of protozoa. Endemic biodiversity is also common.

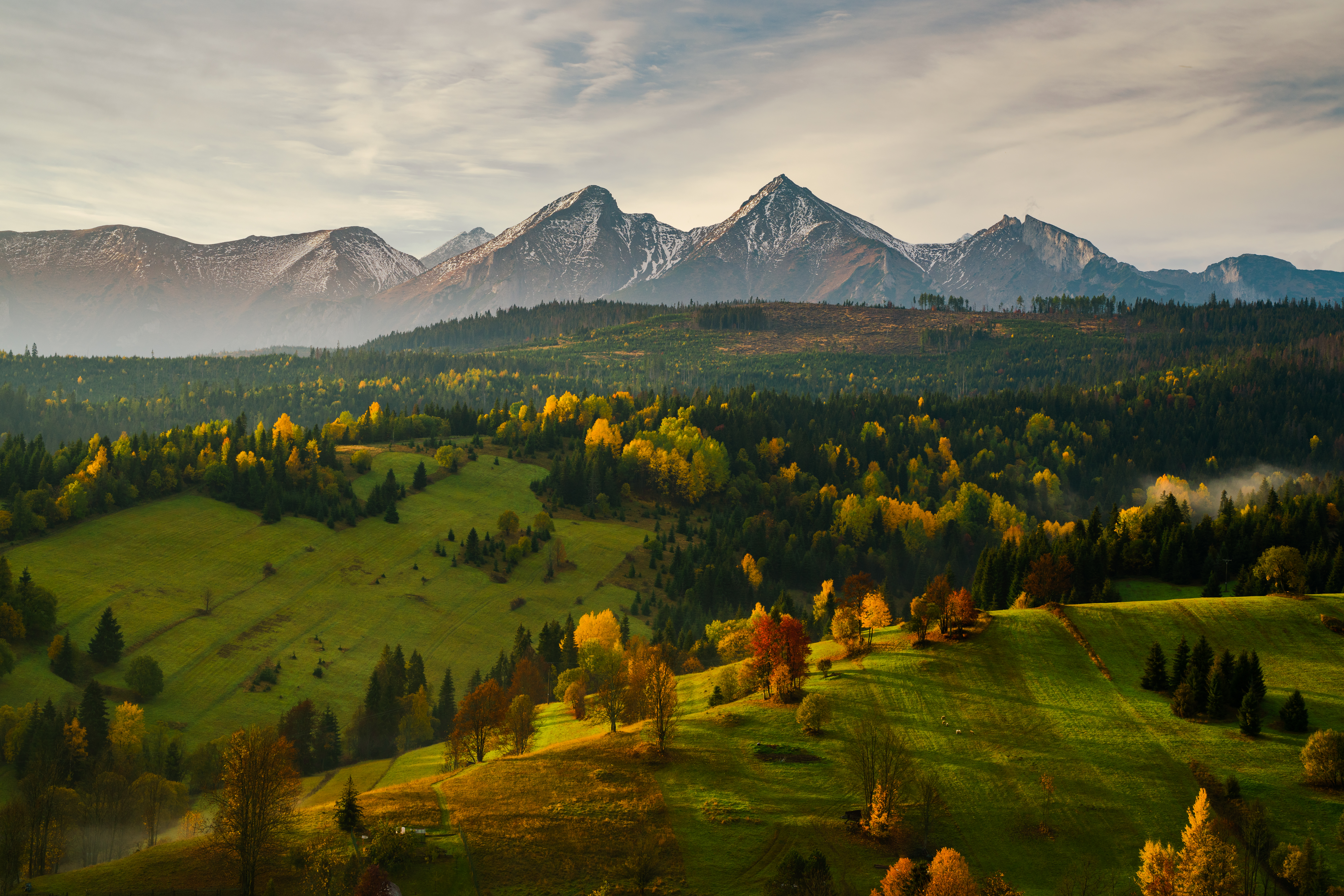
Belianske Tatras

Slovakia is located in the biome of temperate broadleaf and mixed forests and terrestrial ecoregions of Pannonian mixed forests and Carpathian montane conifer forests. As the altitude changes, the vegetation associations and animal communities are forming height levels (oak, beech, spruce, scrub pine, alpine meadows and subsoil). Forests cover 44% of the territory of Slovakia. The country had a 2019 Forest Landscape Integrity Index mean score of 4.34/10, ranking it 129th globally out of 172 countries. In terms of forest stands, 60% are broadleaf trees and 40% are coniferous trees. The occurrence of animal species is strongly connected to the appropriate types of plant associations and biotopes.

Over 4,000 species of fungi have been recorded from Slovakia. Of these, nearly 1,500 are lichen-forming species. Some of these fungi are undoubtedly endemic, but not enough is known to say how many. Of the lichen-forming species, about 40% have been classified as threatened in some way. About 7% are apparently extinct, 9% endangered, 17% vulnerable, and 7% rare. The conservation status of non-lichen-forming fungi in Slovakia is not well documented, but there is a red list for its larger fungi.

=== Water ===
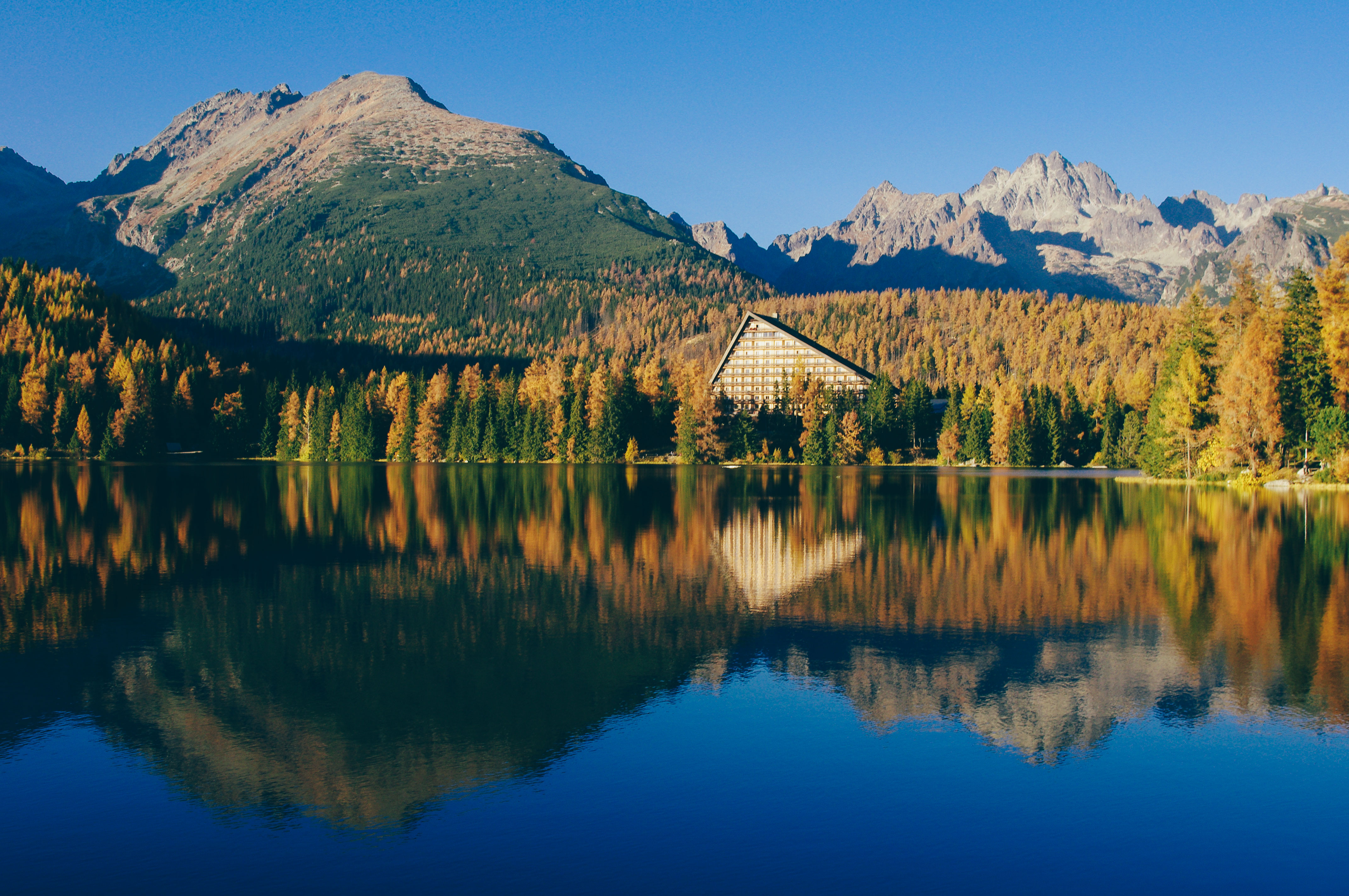
Mountain lake Štrbské pleso

The entire population of Slovakia has access to a safe-drinking water source. The country has one of the best quality tap water in the world, it is the second country in Europe (after Austria) with the largest reserves of drinking water. Groundwater is the drinking water source of the highest quality protected by Constitution of Slovakia. Since 2014, it is banned the export of drinking and mineral waters in pipelines and water tanks. The ban excludes bottled water and water for personal use. Both, groundwater (82.2%) as well as surface water (17.8%) are exploited as drinking water sources. Žitný ostrov is the biggest natural groundwater source in Slovakia and as well in Central Europe.

About 1300 mineral sources are registered, providing curative water and high quality mineral water for drinking. There are 21 thermal spa towns built on these mineral springs. The most visited are Piešťany, Trenčianske Teplice, Bardejov and Dudince.

== Government and politics ==
Robert Fico,
Prime Minister
since 2023

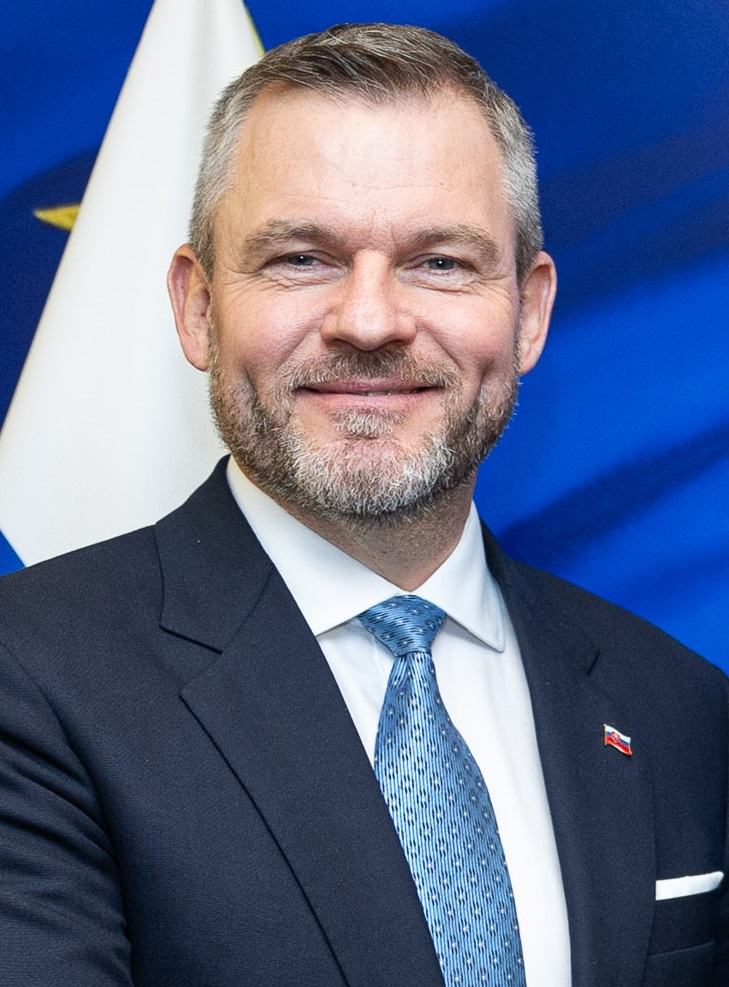
Peter Pellegrini,
President
since 2024

Slovakia is a parliamentary democratic republic with a multi-party system. The last parliamentary elections were held on 30 September 2023 and two rounds of presidential elections took place on 23 March and 6 April 2024.

The Slovak head of state and the formal head of the executive is the president (currently Peter Pellegrini), though with very limited powers. The president is elected by direct, popular vote under the two-round system for a five-year term. Most executive power lies with the head of government, the prime minister (currently Robert Fico), who is usually the leader of the winning party and who needs to form a majority coalition in the parliament. The prime minister is appointed by the president. The remainder of the cabinet is appointed by the president on the recommendation of the prime minister.

Slovakia's highest legislative body is the 150-seat unicameral National Council of the Slovak Republic (Národná rada Slovenskej republiky). Delegates are elected for a four-year term on the basis of proportional representation.

Slovakia's highest judicial body is the Constitutional Court of Slovakia (Ústavný súd), which rules on constitutional issues. The thirteen members of this court are appointed by the president from a slate of candidates nominated by parliament.

The highest court of appeals for criminal and substantive civil law cases is the Supreme Court

The highest court of appeals for matters of administrative law is the Supreme Administrative Court

The Constitution of the Slovak Republic was ratified on 1 September 1992, and became effective on 1 January 1993. It was amended in September 1998 to allow direct election of the president and again in February 2001 due to EU admission requirements. The civil law system is based on Austro-Hungarian codes. The legal code was modified to comply with the obligations of Organisation on Security and Cooperation in Europe (OSCE) and to expunge the Marxist–Leninist legal theory. Slovakia accepts the compulsory International Court of Justice jurisdiction with reservations.

Main office-holders
Office	Name	Party	Since
President	Peter Pellegrini	Independent	15 June 2024
Prime Minister	Robert Fico	Direction – Social Democracy	25 October 2023
Speaker of the National Council	Richard Raši	Voice – Social Democracy	26 March 2025

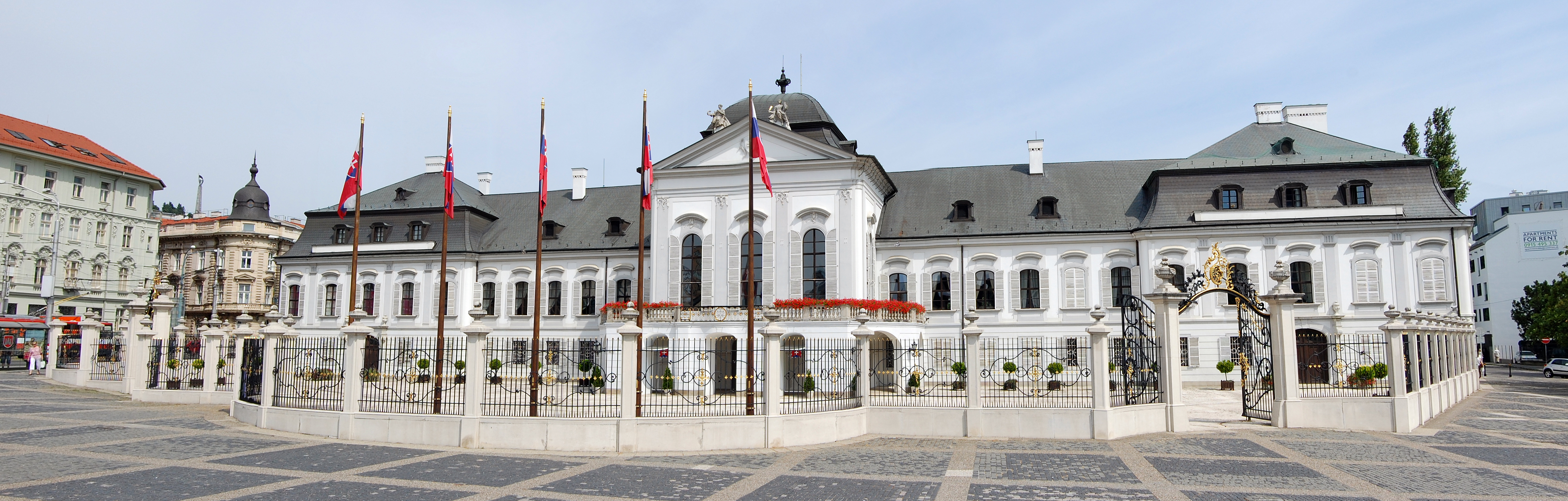
Grassalkovich Palace in Bratislava is the seat of the President of Slovakia

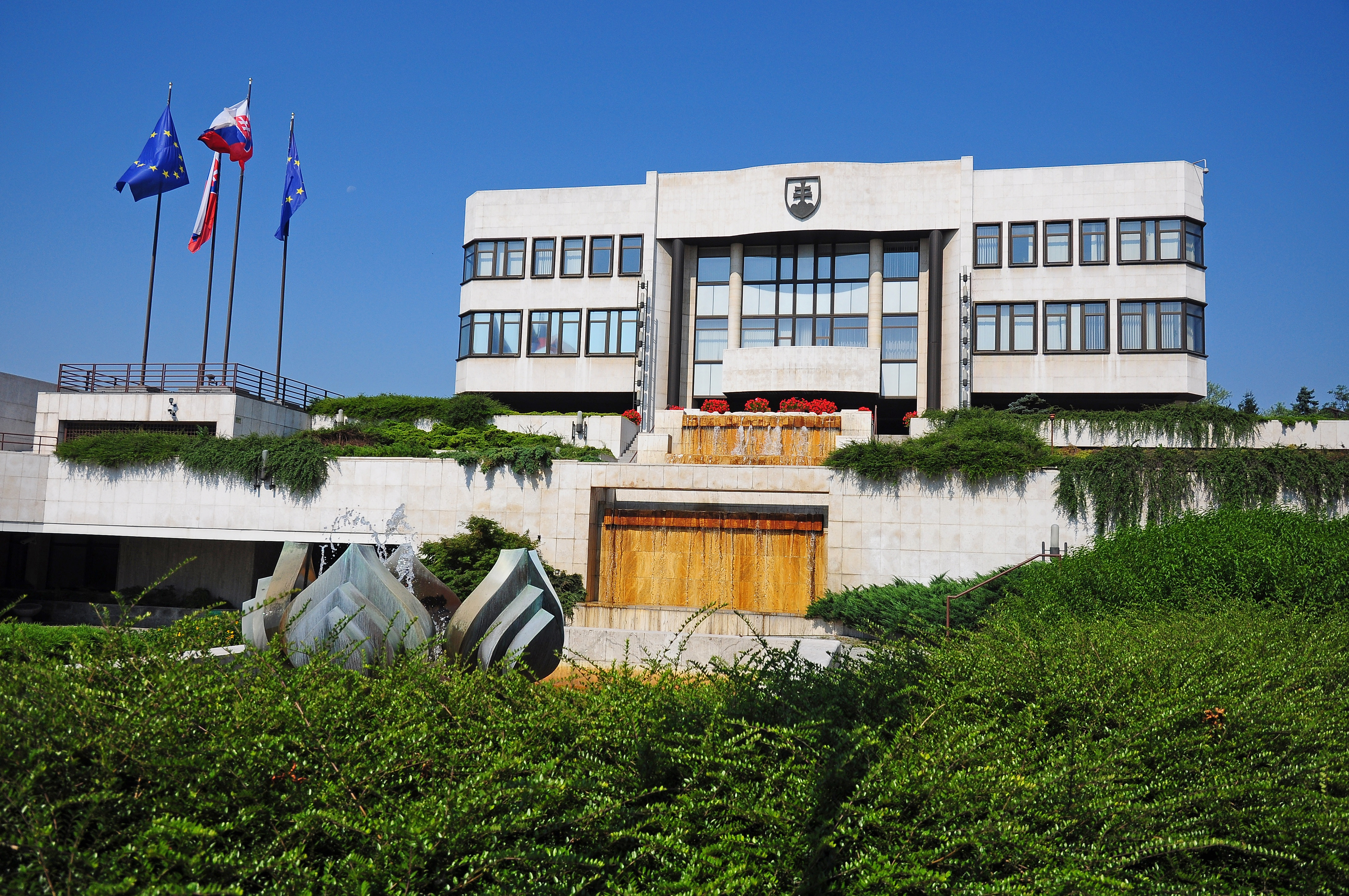
The National Council building in Bratislava

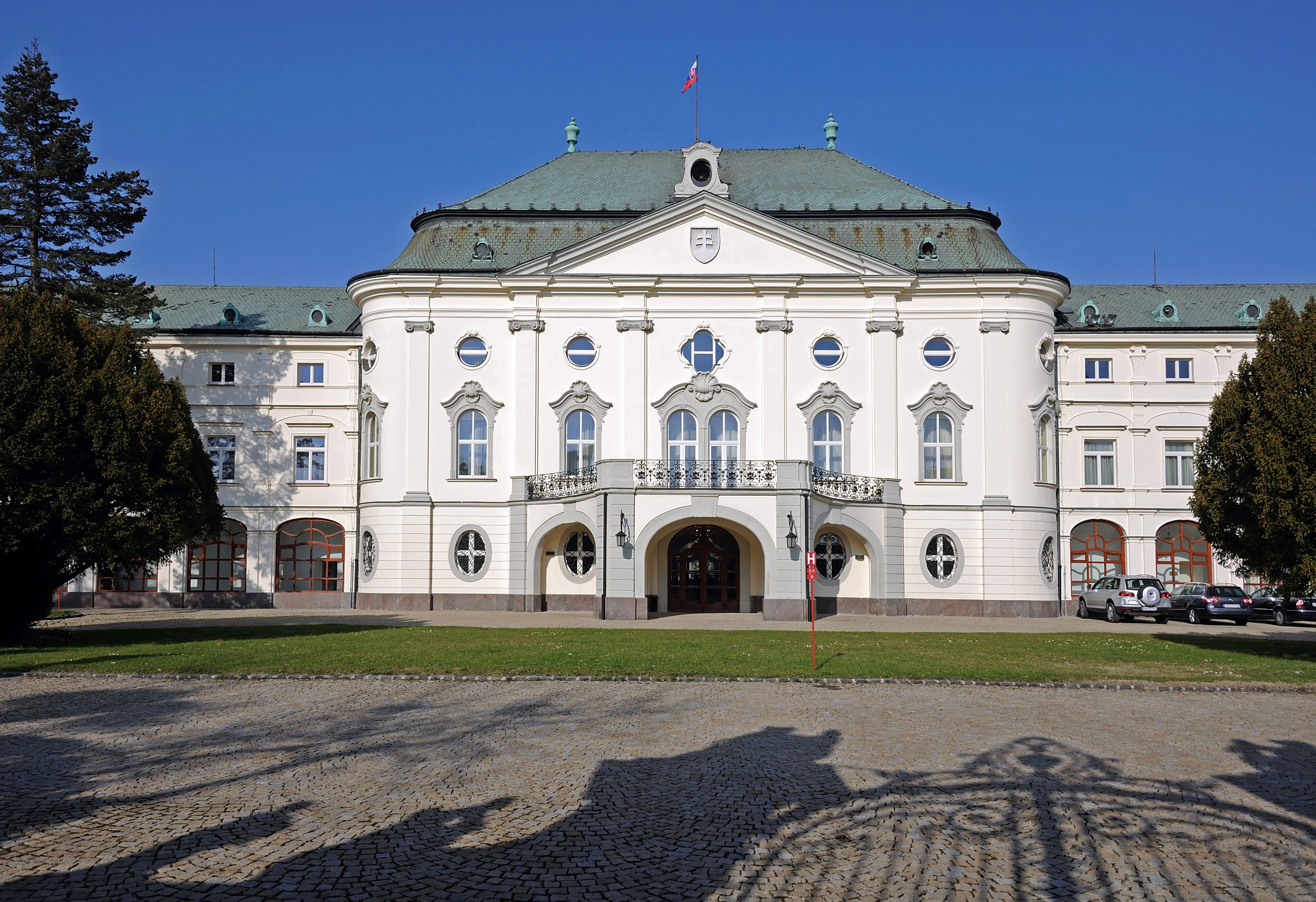
Episcopal Summer Palace, the seat of the government of Slovakia

=== Foreign relations ===
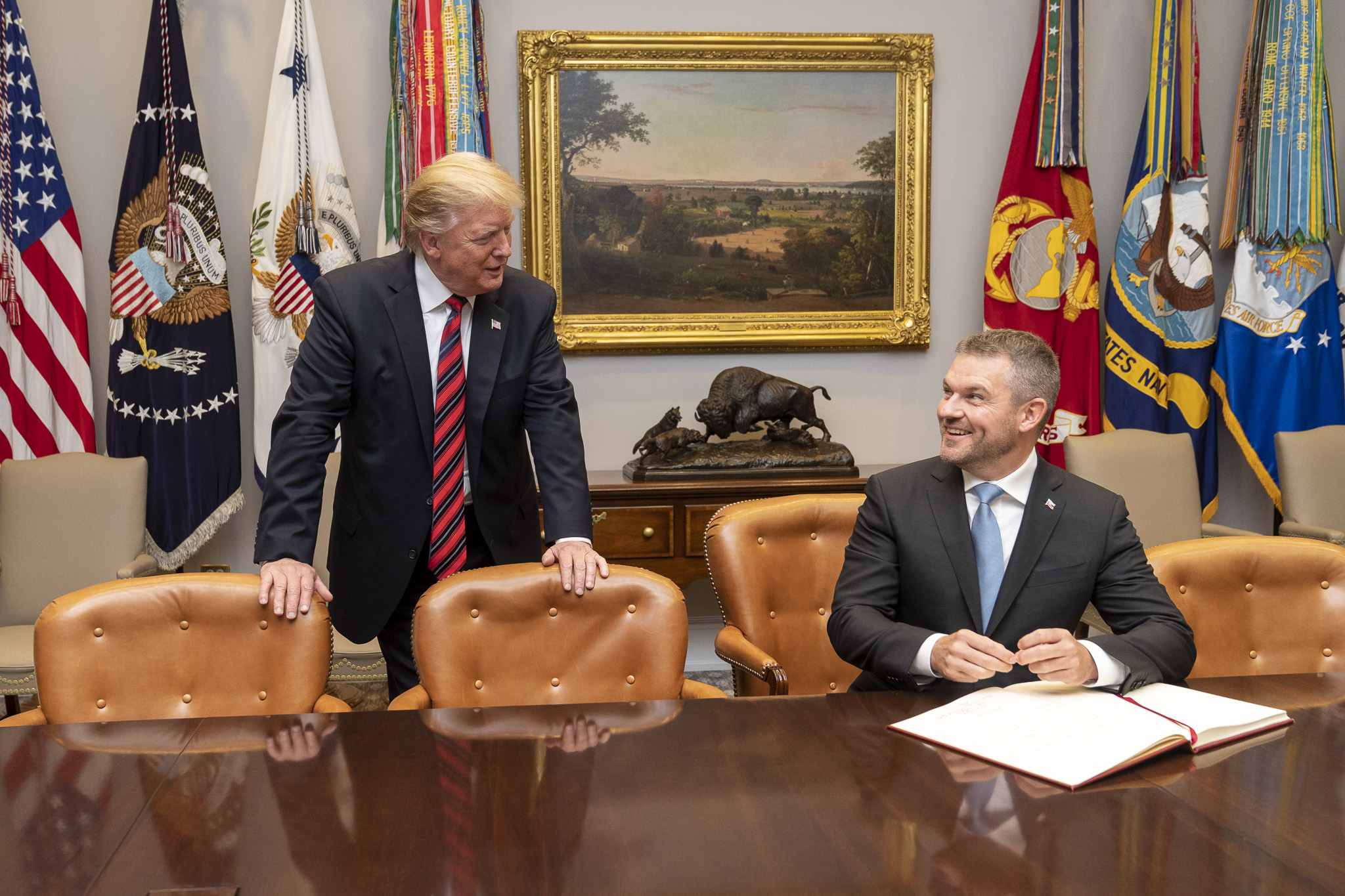
Former Slovak Prime Minister Peter Pellegrini (current President of Slovakia) with U.S. President Donald Trump in the White House, 2019

The Ministry of Foreign and European Affairs (Slovak: Ministerstvo zahraničných vecí a európskych záležitostí) is responsible for maintaining the Slovak Republic's external relations and the management of its international diplomatic missions. The ministry's director is Juraj Blanár. The ministry oversees Slovakia's affairs with foreign entities, including bilateral relations with individual nations and its representation in international organisations.

Slovakia joined the European Union and NATO in 2004, the Schengen Area in 2007 and the eurozone in 2009.

Slovakia is a member of the United Nations (since 1993) and participates in its specialised agencies. The country was, on 10 October 2005, elected to a two-year term on the UN Security Council from 2006 to 2007. It is also a member of the Council of Europe (CoE), the Organisation for Security and Co-operation in Europe (OSCE), the World Trade Organisation (WTO), the World Health Organization (WHO), the Organisation for Economic Co-operation and Development (OECD), the International Monetary Fund (IMF), the Union for the Mediterranean (UfM), the International Criminal Police Organisation (INTERPOL), the United Nations Educational, Scientific and Cultural Organisation (UNESCO), the European Organisation for Nuclear Research (CERN), the Bucharest Nine (B9) and part of the Visegrád Group (V4: Slovakia, Hungary, the Czech Republic, and Poland).

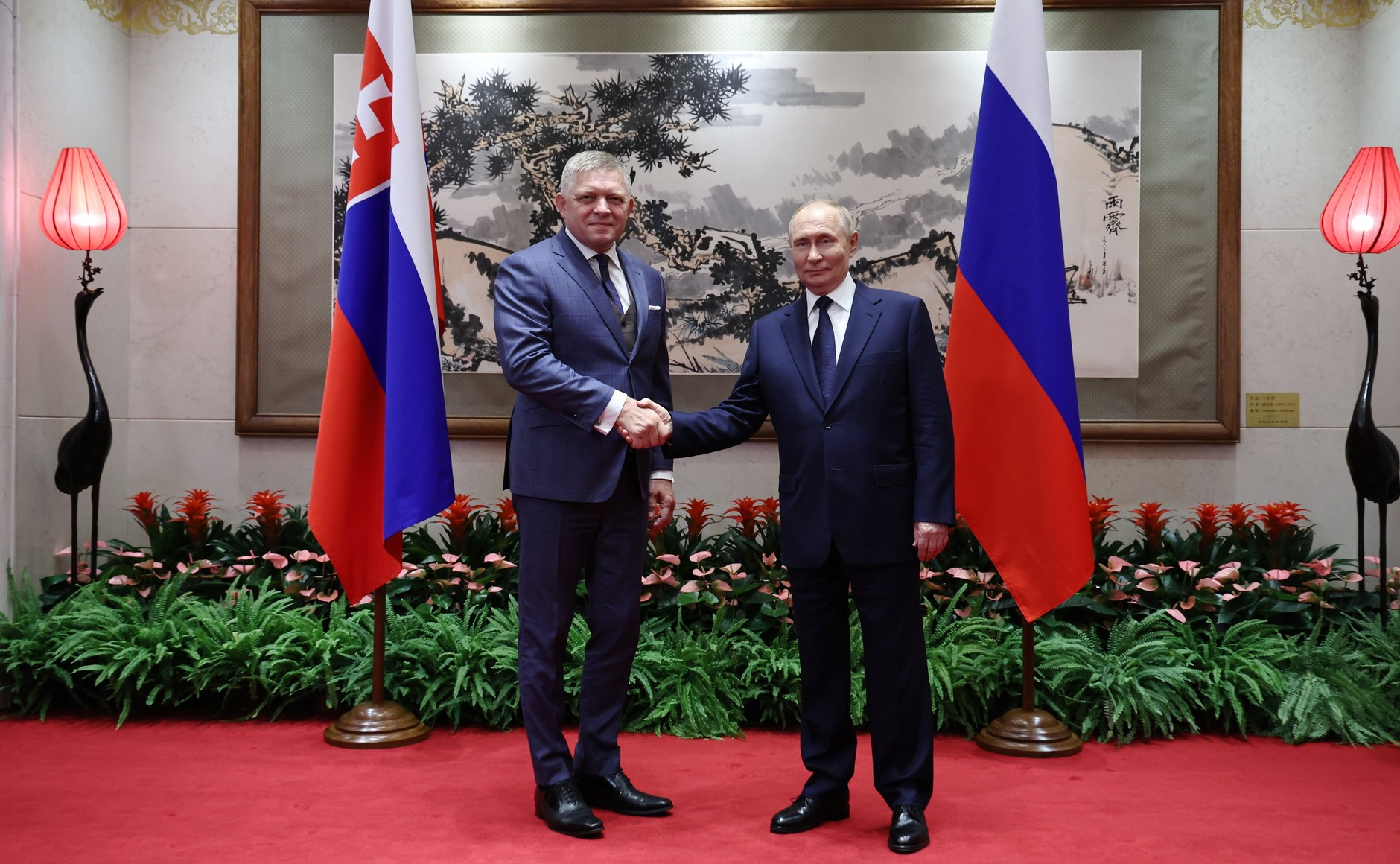
Slovak Prime Minister Robert Fico with Russian President Vladimir Putin in Beijing, 2025

In 2025, Slovak citizens had visa-free or visa-on-arrival access to 185 countries and territories, putting the Slovak passport at the 6th rank of travel freedom (tied with Hungary, Malta, New Zealand, Poland and Slovenia) on the Henley Passport Index.

Slovakia maintains diplomatic relations with 134 countries, primarily through its Ministry of Foreign Affairs. Slovakia maintained 90 missions abroad, including 64 embassies, seven missions to multilateral organisations, nine consulates-general, one consular office, one Slovak Economic and Cultural Office and eight Slovak Institutes. Bratislava hosts 41 foreign embassies and 22 consulates.

Largest trading partners are countries of the European Union. In 2024, more than 80% of Slovak exports went to the European Union, and more than 65% of Slovak imports came from other European Union member states.

Slovakia and the United States retain strong diplomatic ties and cooperate in the military and law enforcement areas. U.S. Department of Defence programmes has contributed significantly to Slovak military reforms. The two countries have a long history tracing back to the American Revolutionary War, when a Slovak Major, Ján Ladislav Polerecký, fought alongside George Washington in Yorktowne to win the colonies' independence. President Woodrow Wilson and the United States played a major role in the establishment of the original Czechoslovak state on 28 October 1918. Around one million Americans have their roots in Slovakia, and many retain strong cultural and familial ties to the Slovak Republic.

=== Military ===
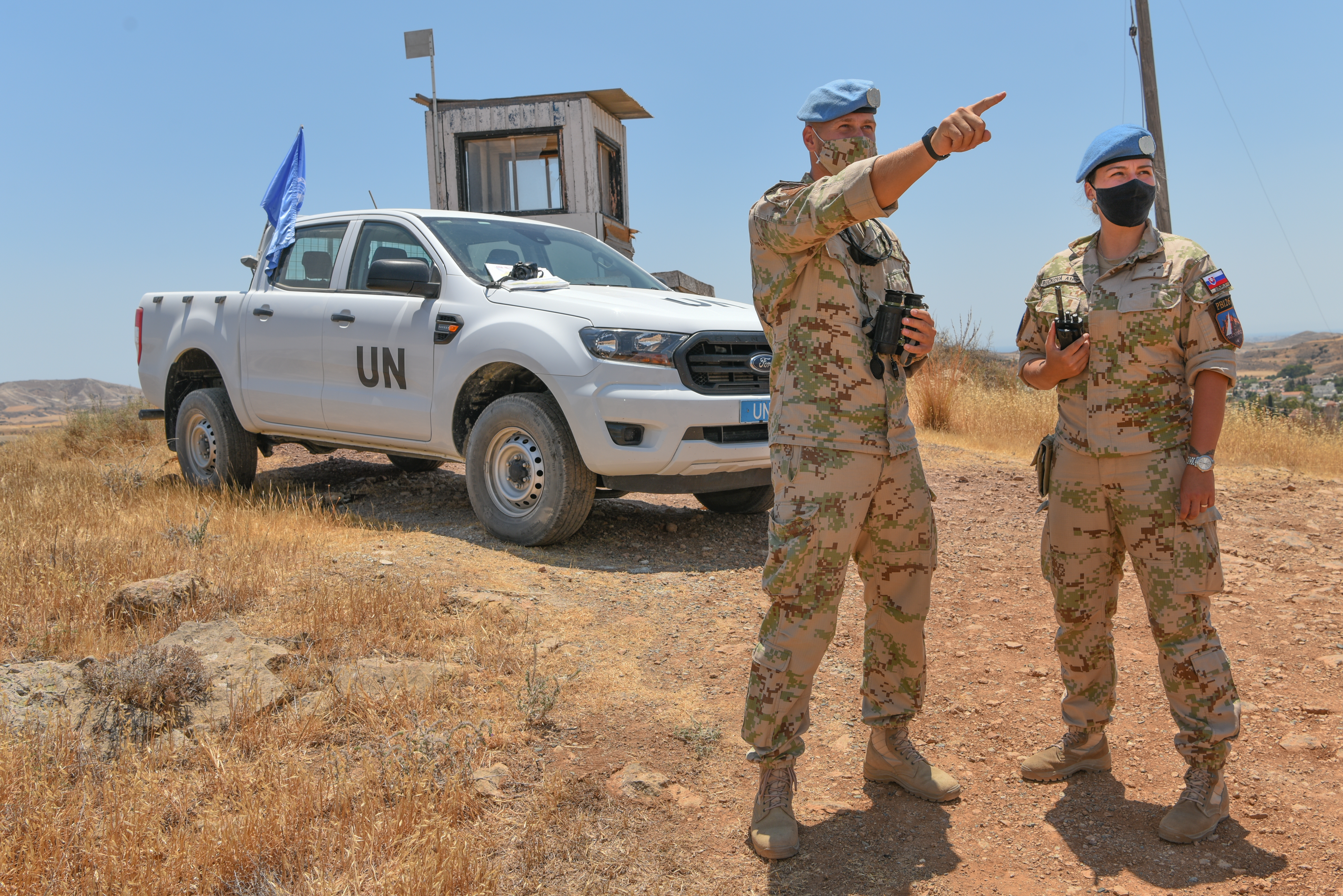
Slovak members of UNFICYP peacekeepers patrolling the buffer zone in Cyprus

The president is formally the commander-in-chief of the Slovak Armed Forces.

Slovakia joined NATO in March 2004. In 2006, the army transformed into a fully professional organisation and compulsory military service was abolished. The Slovak Armed Forces numbered 19,500 uniformed personnel and 4,208 civilians in 2022.

As of 2025, Slovakia has 240 military personnel deployed in Cyprus for UNFICYP United Nations led peace support operations, 50 troops deployed in Bosnia and Herzegovina for EUFOR Althea and 135 troops deployed in Latvia for NATO Enhanced Forward Presence.

The Slovak Ground Forces are made up of two active mechanised brigades. The Slovak Air Force consists of, one wing of fighter aircraft, one wing of utility helicopters, one wing of transport aircraft, and one air defence brigade. Training and support forces comprise a National Support Element (Multifunctional Battalion, Transport Battalion, Repair Battalion), a garrison force of the capital city Bratislava, as well as a training battalion, and various logistics, communication, and information bases. Miscellaneous forces under the direct command of the General Staff include the 5th Special Forces Regiment.

=== Human rights ===
Human rights in Slovakia are guaranteed by the Constitution of Slovakia from the year 1992 and by multiple international laws signed in Slovakia between 1948 and 2006. Slovakia performs favourably in measurements of civil liberties, press freedom, internet freedom, democratic governance, and peacefulness.

The US State Department in 2021 reported:

The government generally respected the human rights of its citizens; however, there were problems in some areas. Significant human rights issues included credible reports of: corruption; violence and threats of violence against Roma and members of other ethnic and racial minorities; and violence and threats of violence targeting lesbian, gay, bisexual, transgender, queer, and intersex persons.

According to the European Roma Rights Centre (ERRC), Romani people in Slovakia "endure racism in the job market, housing and education fields and are often subjected to forced evictions, vigilante intimidation, disproportionate levels of police brutality and more subtle forms of discrimination."

According to International IDEA's Global State of Democracy (GSoD) Indices and Democracy Tracker, Slovakia performs in the mid-range on overall democratic measures, with particular strengths in political equality and judicial independence.

=== Administrative divisions ===
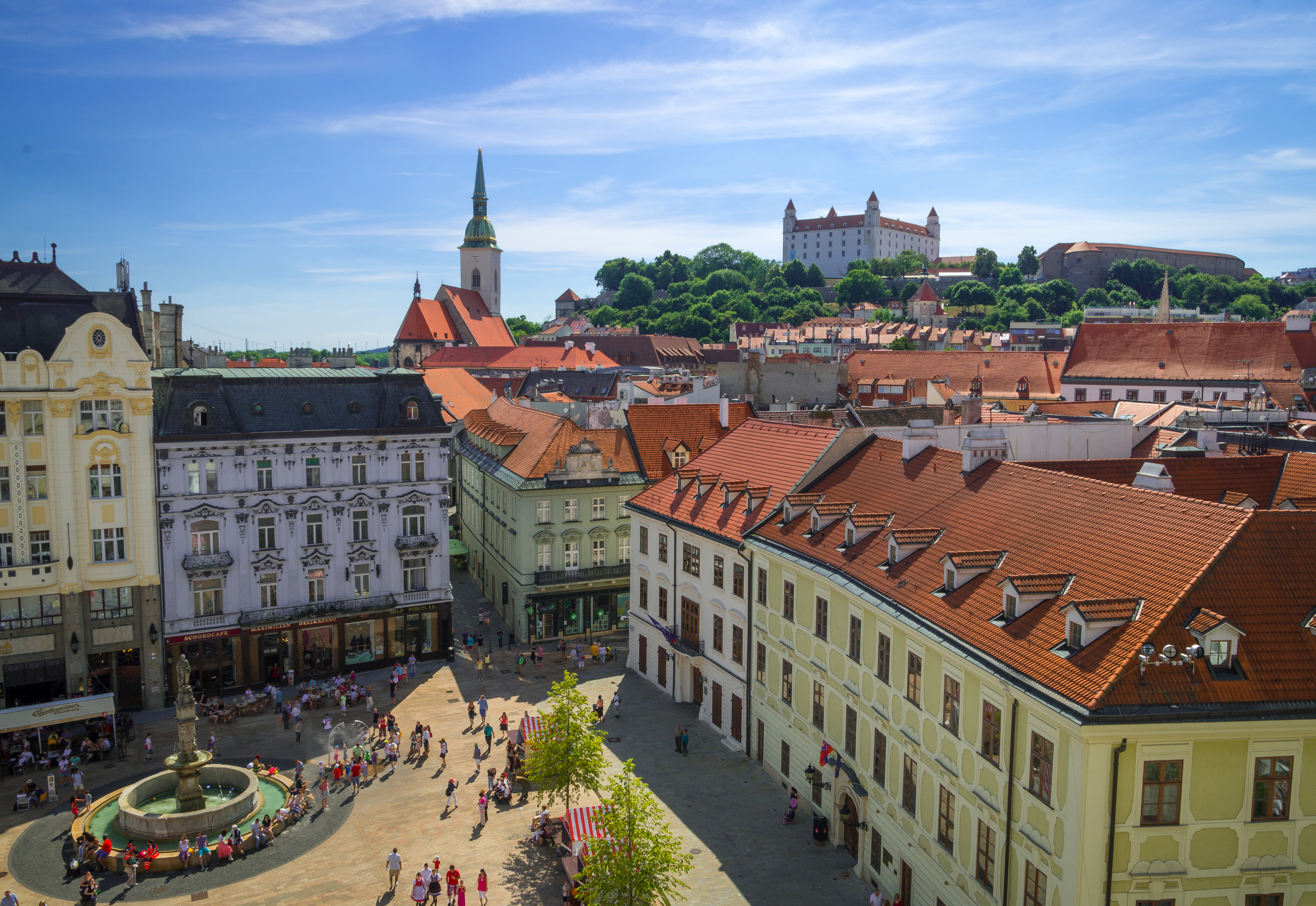
Bratislava, capital and largest city of Slovakia

Slovakia is divided into 8 kraje (singular—kraj, usually translated as "region"), each of which is named after its principal city. Regions have enjoyed a certain degree of autonomy since 2002. Their self-governing bodies are referred to as Self-governing (or autonomous) Regions (sg. samosprávny kraj, pl. samosprávne kraje) or Upper-Tier Territorial Units (sg. vyšší územný celok, pl. vyššie územné celky, abbr. VÚC).

The kraje are subdivided into okresy (sg. okres, usually translated as districts). Slovakia currently has 79 districts.

The okresy are further divided into obce (sg. obec, usually translated as "municipality"). There are currently 2,890 municipalities.

In terms of economics and unemployment rate, the western regions are richer than eastern regions. Bratislava is the 19th-richest region of the European Union by GDP (PPP) per capita; GDP at purchasing power parity is about three times higher than in other Slovak regions.

Name in English	Name in Slovak	Administrative seat	Population (2021)
Bratislava Region	Bratislavský kraj	Bratislava	719,537
Trnava Region	Trnavský kraj	Trnava	566,008
Nitra Region	Nitriansky kraj	Nitra	677,900
Trenčín Region	Trenčiansky kraj	Trenčín	577,464
Žilina Region	Žilinský kraj	Žilina	691,613
Banská Bystrica Region	Banskobystrický kraj	Banská Bystrica	625,601
Prešov Region	Prešovský kraj	Prešov	808,931
Košice Region	Košický kraj	Košice	782,216

== Economy ==
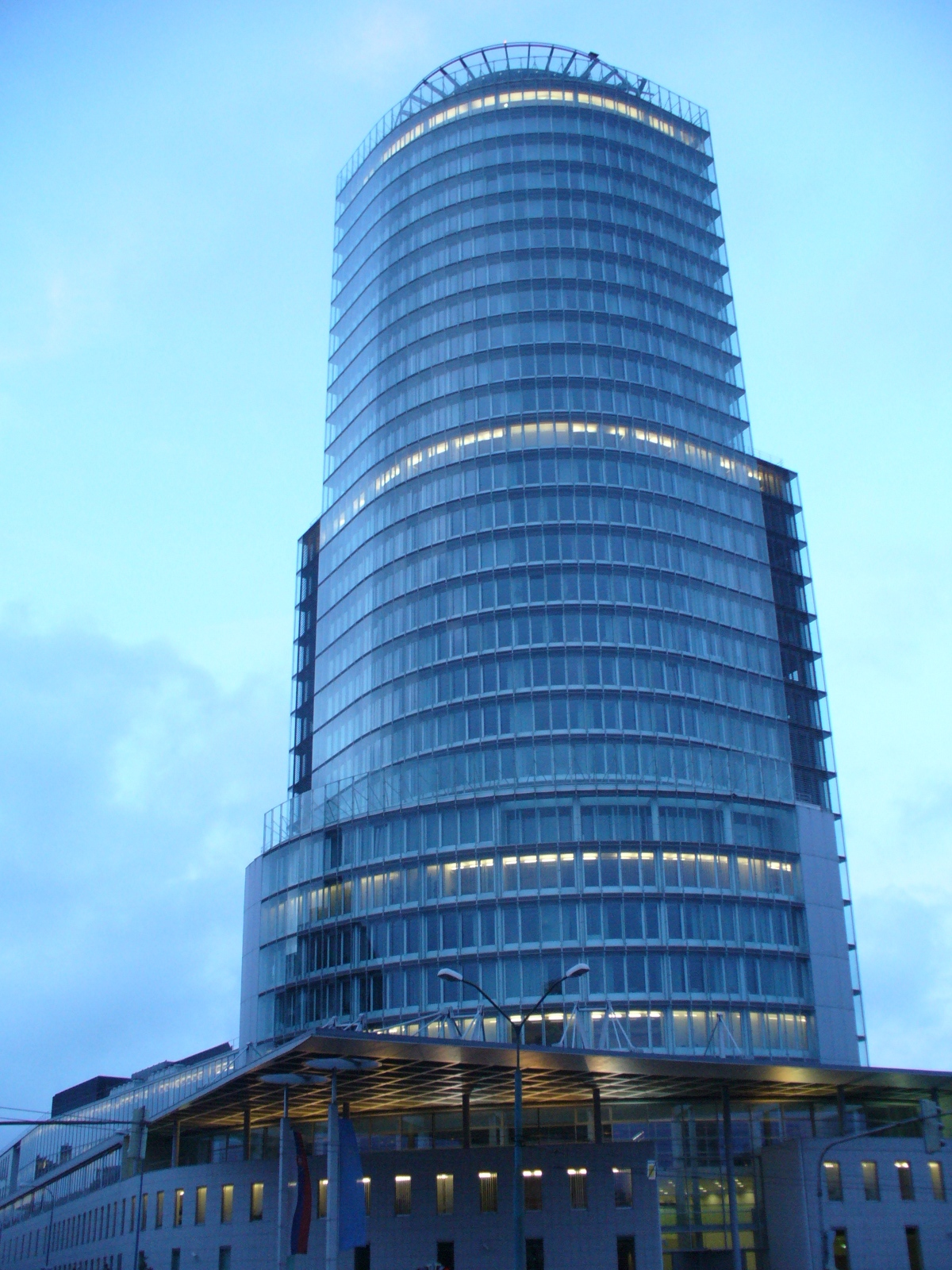
National Bank of Slovakia in Bratislava

Slovakia has a high-income developed economy. In 2026, with a population of only 5 million, it ranked as the 47th richest country with a per capita gross domestic product based on purchasing power parity of $49,376, and the 58th largest economy in the World with a GDP of $167,730 billion. Its GDP per capita equalling 74% of the average of the European Union in 2023. Major privatisations are completed, the banking sector is almost completely in private hands, and foreign investment has risen.

In 2024, more than 80% of Slovak exports went to the European Union, and more than 65% of Slovak imports came from other European Union member states. Main export partners are Germany (23% of total exports), Czech Republic (12.4%), Poland (8.3%) and Austria (5.7%).

The country has difficulties addressing regional imbalances in wealth and employment. GDP per capita ranges from 188% of EU average in Bratislava to 54% in Eastern Slovakia. Bratislava is the 19th-richest region of the European Union by GDP (PPP) per capita. Although regional income inequality is high, 90% of citizens own their homes. The housing affordability is low, with one of the highest housing related expenditure relative to household final consumption expenditure in OECD.

Slovakia is part of the Schengen Area, the EU single market, and since 2009, the eurozone (dark blue).

The country used to be dubbed the "Tatra Tiger" in the 2000s as it successfully transformed from a centrally planned economy to a market-driven economy and achieved, on average, roughly 6% per capita GDP growth each year from 2000 to 2008.

Unemployment, peaking at 19% at the end of 1999, decreased to 4.9% in 2019, lowest recorded rate in Slovak history. Unemployment rate was 5.3% as per June 2025.

The ratio of government debt to GDP in Slovakia reached 60.5% in 2024.

A high dependence on global supply chains and energy imports makes the Slovak economy vulnerable to external shocks. As a consequence, the economy was hit hard by the global COVID-19 pandemic crisis (−3.3% decline in 2020), despite sizeable economic policy support. And after a strong recovery in 2021 (+4.8% growth), growth slowed down markedly in 2022 (+1.9%) and 2023 (+1.6%) as a result of the consequences of the Russian invasion of Ukraine, notably the subsequent EU sanctions on Russia and soaring energy prices.

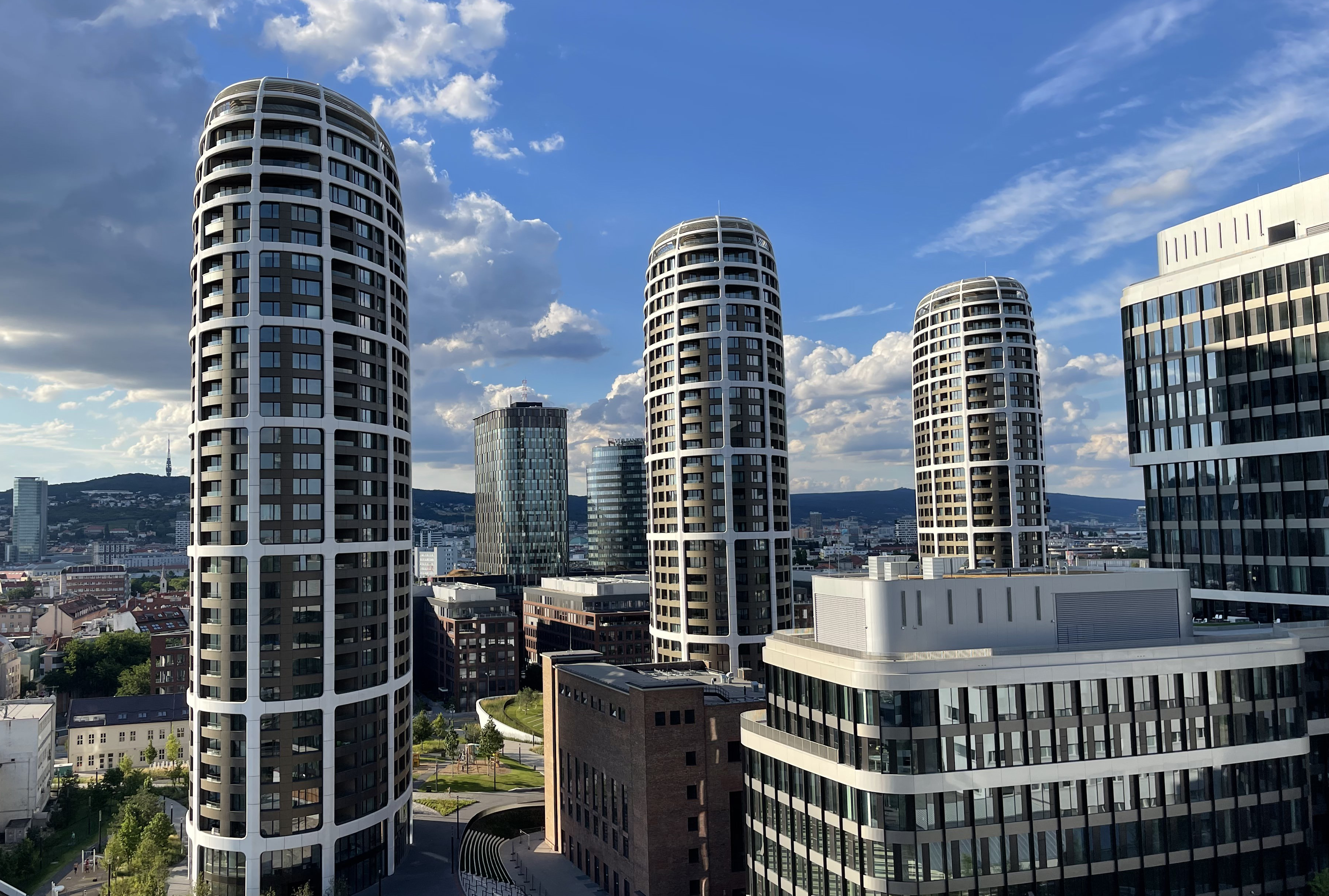
High-rise buildings in Bratislava's business districts

The Slovak government encourages foreign investment since it is one of the driving forces of the economy. Slovakia is an attractive country for foreign investors mainly because of its low wages, low tax rates, well educated labour force, favourable geographic location in the heart of Central Europe, strong political stability and good international relations reinforced by the country's accession to the European Union. Some regions, mostly at the east of Slovakia have failed to attract major investment, which has aggravated regional disparities in many economic and social areas.

Slovakia adopted the euro currency on 1 January 2009 as the 16th member of the eurozone. The euro in Slovakia was approved by the European commission on 7 May 2008. The Slovak koruna was revalued on 28 May 2008 to 30.126 for 1 euro, which was also the exchange rate for the euro.

Slovakia ranks 45th out of 190 economies in terms of ease of doing business, according to the 2020 World Bank Doing Business Report and 59th out of the 67 countries and territories in terms of competitive economy, according to the 2024 World Competitiveness Yearbook Report.

=== Industry ===
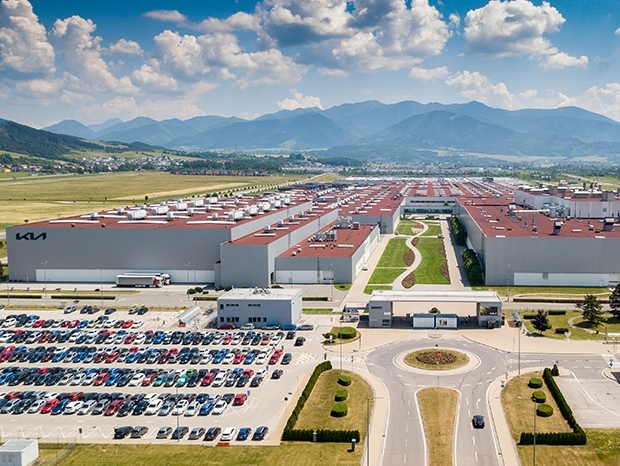
Kia's car production plant in Žilina

Although Slovakia's GDP comes mainly from the tertiary (services) sector, the industrial sector also plays an important role within its economy. The main industry sectors are car manufacturing and electrical engineering. Since 2007, Slovakia has been the world's largest producer of cars per capita, with a total of 1,080,000 cars manufactured in the country in 2023 alone. 275,000 people are employed directly and indirectly by the automotive industry. There are currently four automobile assembly plants, with a fifth under construction: Volkswagen's in Bratislava (models: Volkswagen Up, Volkswagen Touareg, Audi Q7, Audi Q8, Porsche Cayenne, Lamborghini Urus), PSA Peugeot Citroën's in Trnava (models: Peugeot 208, Citroën C3 Picasso), Kia Motors' Žilina Plant (models: Kia Cee'd, Kia Sportage, Kia Venga) and Jaguar Land Rover's in Nitra (model: Land Rover Defender, Land Rover Discovery). Volvo will make electric cars at a new plant at the east of Slovakia, construction began in 2023 in Košice, with series production starting in 2027. Hyundai Mobis in Žilina is the largest suppliers for the automotive industry in Slovakia.

U.S. Steel in Košice, a branch of the American steel producer U.S. Steel, is the largest employer in eastern Slovakia with 7,500 employees.

ESET is an IT security company from Bratislava with more than 1,000 employees worldwide at present. Their branch offices are in the United States, Ireland, United Kingdom, Argentina, the Czech Republic, Singapore and Poland. In recent years, service and high-tech-oriented businesses have prospered in Bratislava. Many global companies, including IBM, Dell, Lenovo, AT&T, SAP, and Accenture, have built outsourcing and service centres here. Reasons for the influx of multi-national corporations include proximity to Western Europe, skilled labour force and the high density of universities and research facilities. Other large companies and employers with headquarters in Bratislava include Amazon, Slovak Telekom, Orange Slovensko, Slovenská sporiteľňa, Tatra banka, Doprastav, Hewlett-Packard Slovakia, Henkel Slovensko, Slovenský plynárenský priemysel, Microsoft Slovakia, Mondelez Slovakia, Whirlpool Slovakia and Zurich Insurance Group Slovakia.

Bratislava's geographical position in Central Europe has long made Bratislava a crossroads for international trade traffic. Various ancient trade routes, such as the Amber Road and the Danube waterway, have crossed territory of present-day Bratislava. Today, Bratislava is a road, railway, waterway and airway hub.

=== Energy ===
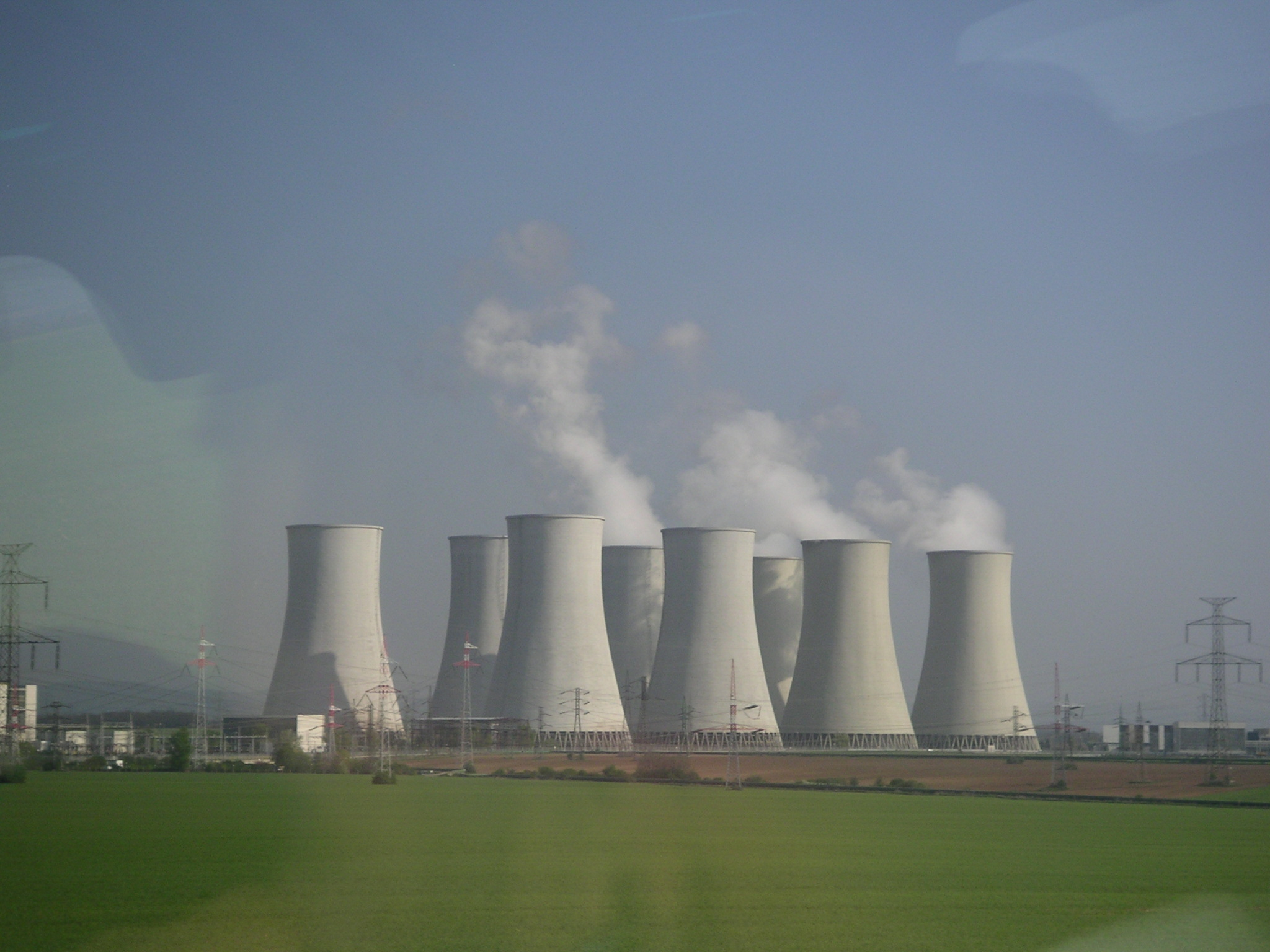
Nuclear Power Plant Jaslovské Bohunice

Slovakia is self-sufficient in electricity production following the launch of the third unit of the Mochovce nuclear power plant in 2023.

In 2020, Slovakia produced a total of 29,322 GWh of electricity. Nuclear energy accounted for 54% (15 400 GWh) of total electricity production, followed by 16% by hydro power energy, 16% natural gas, 8% coal, biofuel 3% and 3% by solar energy,

The two nuclear power-plants in Slovakia are in Jaslovské Bohunice and Mochovce. Jaslovské Bohunice containing two operating reactors. Mochovce containing three operating reactors, unit Mochovce-3 came on-line in January 2023 and unit Mochovce-4 will be completed at the end of 2025. The additional reactors in Mochovce returned Slovakia to being a net exporter of electricity.

In 2024, Slovak government approved a plan to build another new nuclear reactor in Jaslovské Bohunice.

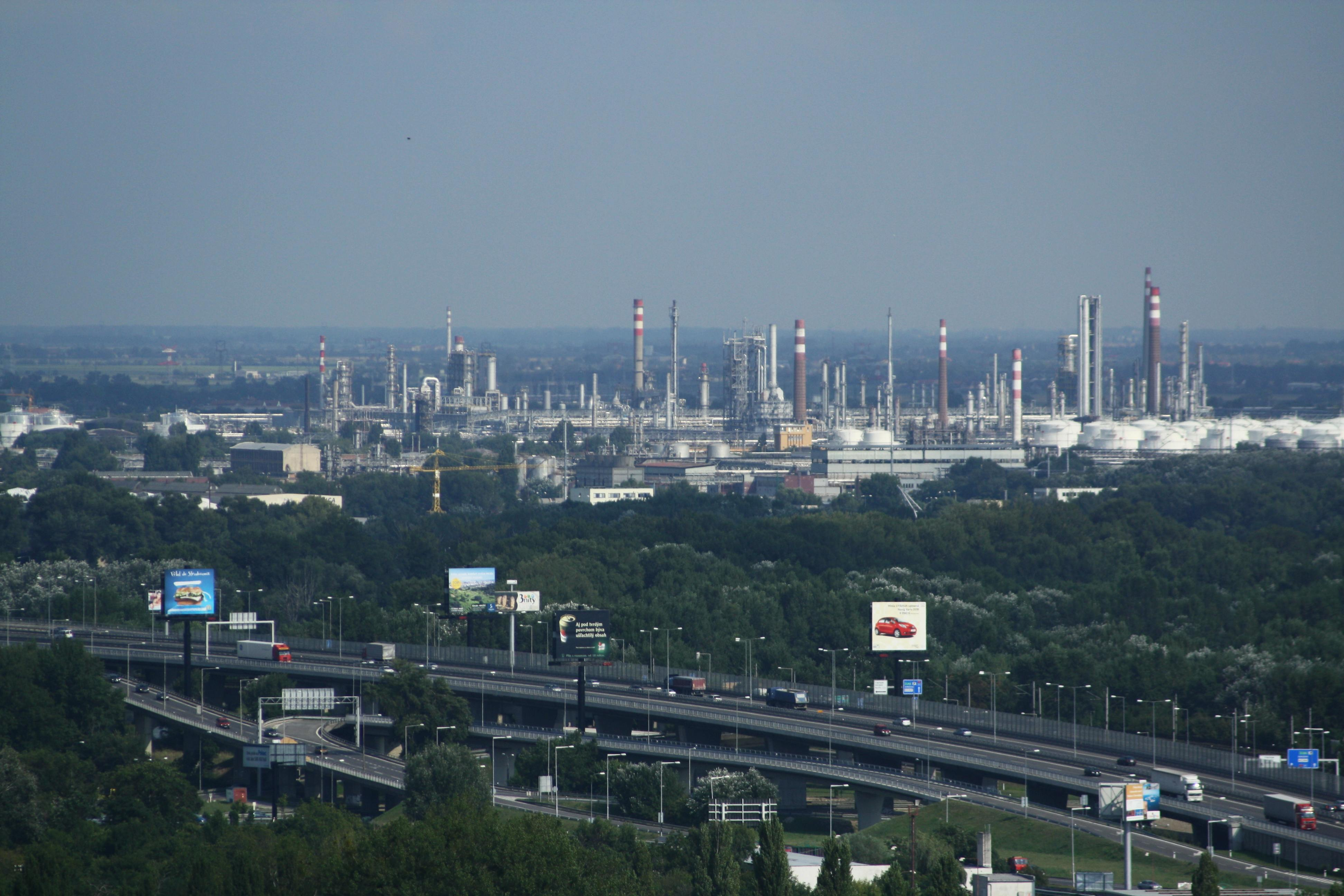
Slovnaft oil refinery in Bratislava

Slovenský plynárenský priemysel (Slovak Gas Industry) is the biggest natural gas seller in Slovakia. In 2024, domestic gas production covers roughly 2% of Slovak consumption. An average of around 65 million m³ of natural gas is produced, while 4,2 billion m³ of natural gas is imported. As of 2025, most of gas imports to Slovakia is from Russia via TurkStream pipeline. TurkStream connects Russia and Turkey, with gas flowing through the Balkans and Hungary before reaching Slovakia.

The oil production in Slovakia is even lower than the gas production. In 2021 it reached a volume of 4,500 tons per year with a total oil consumption of around 6 million tons per year. Among European Union countries, Slovakia is the most dependent on Russian oil and petroleum products. In 2020, Russia was the origin country for 78 percent of the country's total oil imports. Slovnaft, with 4,000 employees, is the largest oil refining company in Slovakia, located in Bratislava. The company refines 5.5 to 6 million tonnes of crude oil per annum and produces a broad range of motor fuels, fuel oils and petrochemical products.

=== Transportation ===
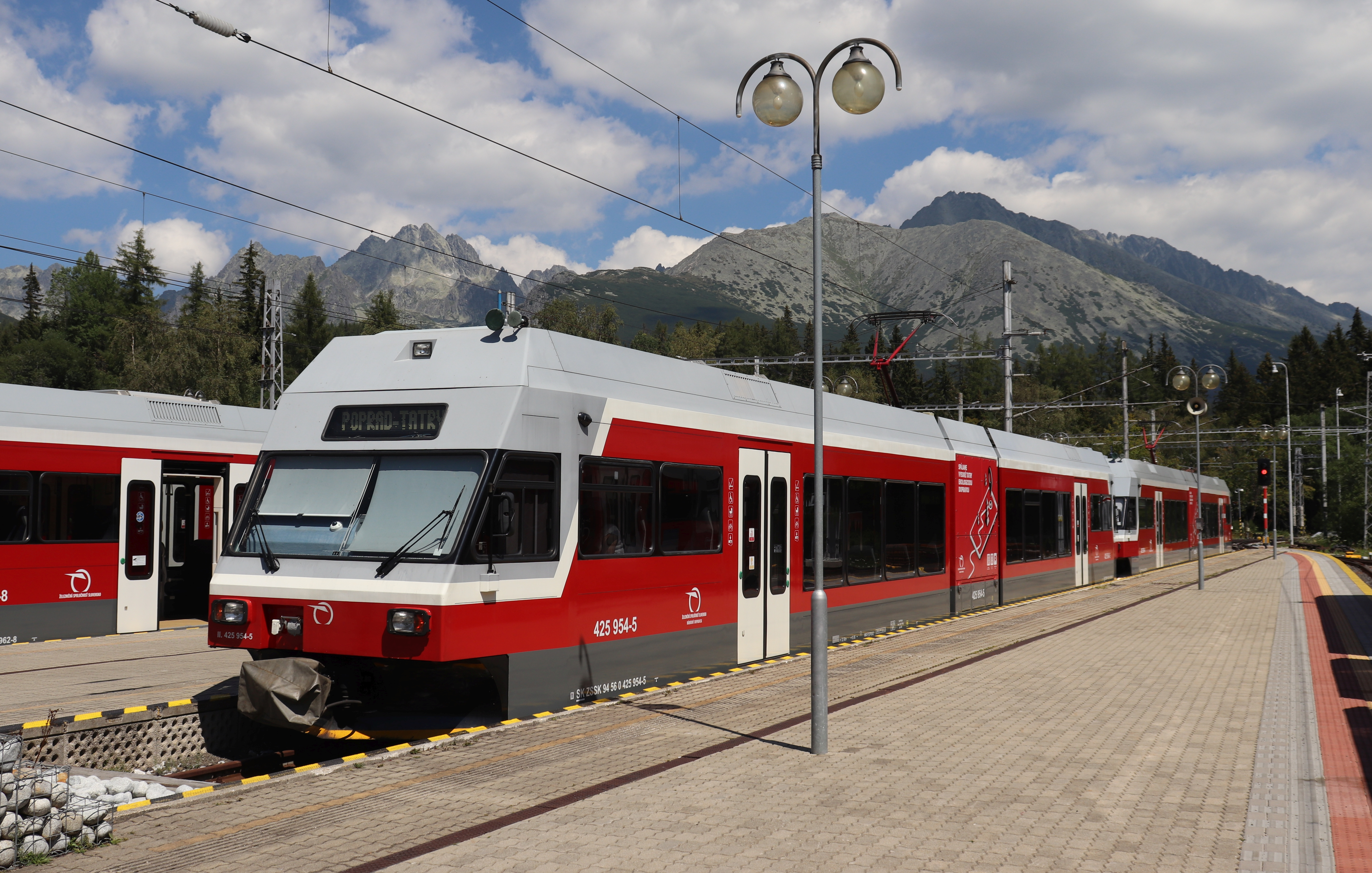
A train in the northern town of Vysoké Tatry

There are four main motorway D1 to D4 and eight expressways R1 to R8. Many of them are still under construction.

The major motorway in Slovakia is D1, the motorway connects major cities across Slovakia from west to east, from Bratislava to Trnava, Nitra, Trenčín, Žilina and beyond. As of 2025, some sections of D1 are still under construction. The D2 motorway connects it to Prague, Brno and Budapest in the north–south direction. A large part of D4 motorway (an outer bypass), which ease the pressure on Bratislava's highway system, opened in 2021. The A6 motorway to Vienna connects Slovakia directly to the Austrian motorway system and was opened on 19 November 2007.

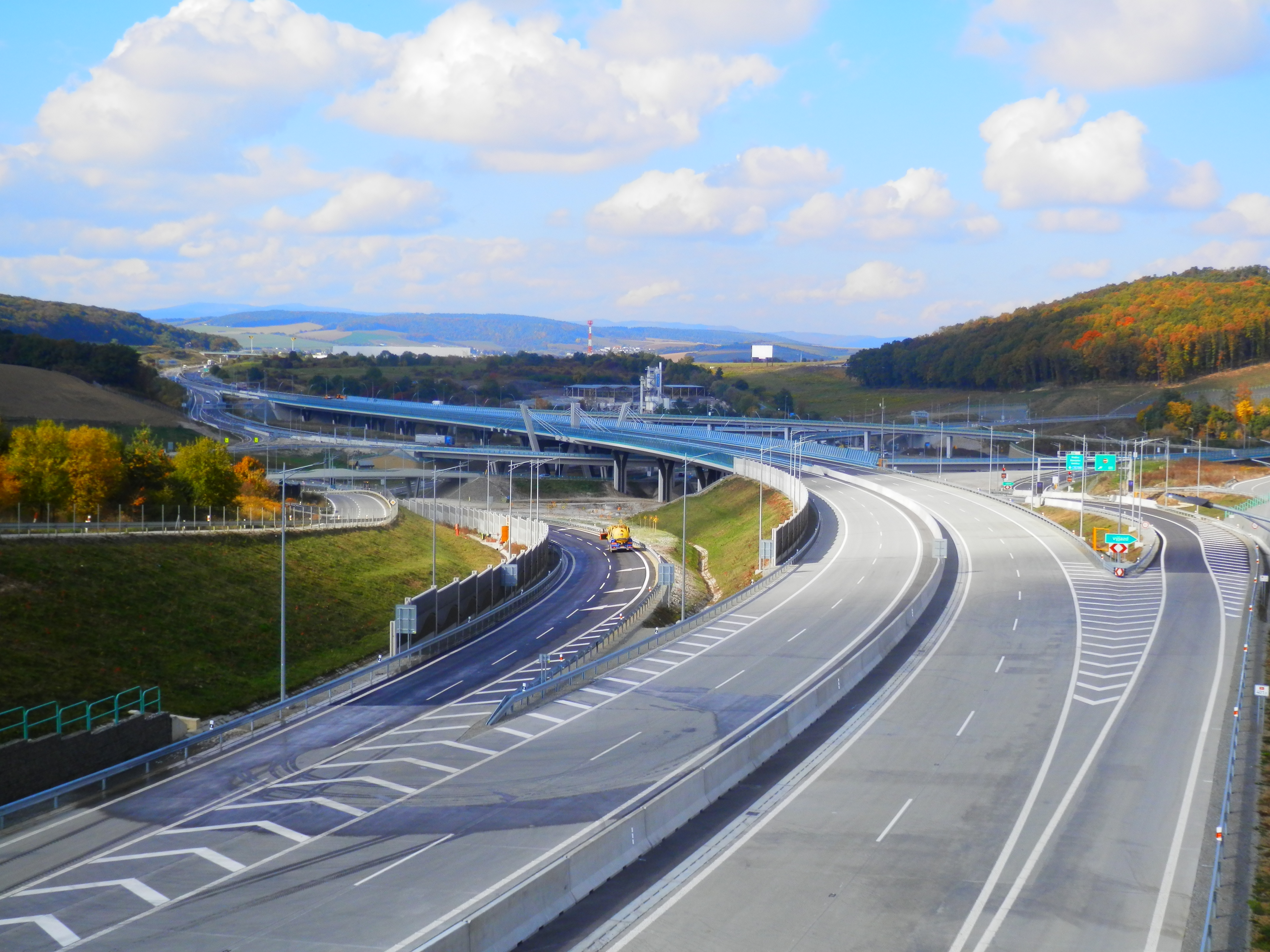
D1 motorway

Slovakia has three international airports. Bratislava Airport is the main and largest international airport. It is located 9 km northeast of the city centre. It serves civil and governmental, scheduled and unscheduled domestic and international flights. The current runways support the landing of all common types of aircraft currently used. The airport has enjoyed rapidly growing passenger traffic in recent years; it served 279,028 passengers in 2000 and 2,292,712 in 2018. Košice International Airport is an airport serving Košice. It is the second-largest international airport in Slovakia. The Poprad–Tatry Airport is the third busiest airport, the airport is located 5 km west-northwest of Poprad. It is an airport with one of the highest elevations in Central Europe, at 718 m, which is 150 m higher than Innsbruck Airport in Austria.

Railways of the Slovak Republic (Železnice Slovenskej Republiky) provides railway transport services on national and international lines.

The Port of Bratislava is one of the two international river ports in Slovakia. The port connects Bratislava to international boat traffic, especially the interconnection from the North Sea to the Black Sea via the Rhine-Main-Danube Canal. Additionally, tourist boats operate from Bratislava's passenger port, including routes to Devín, Vienna and elsewhere. The Port of Komárno is the second largest port in Slovakia with an area of over 20 hectares and is located approximately 100 km east of Bratislava. It lies at the confluence of two rivers – the Danube and Váh.

=== Tourism ===
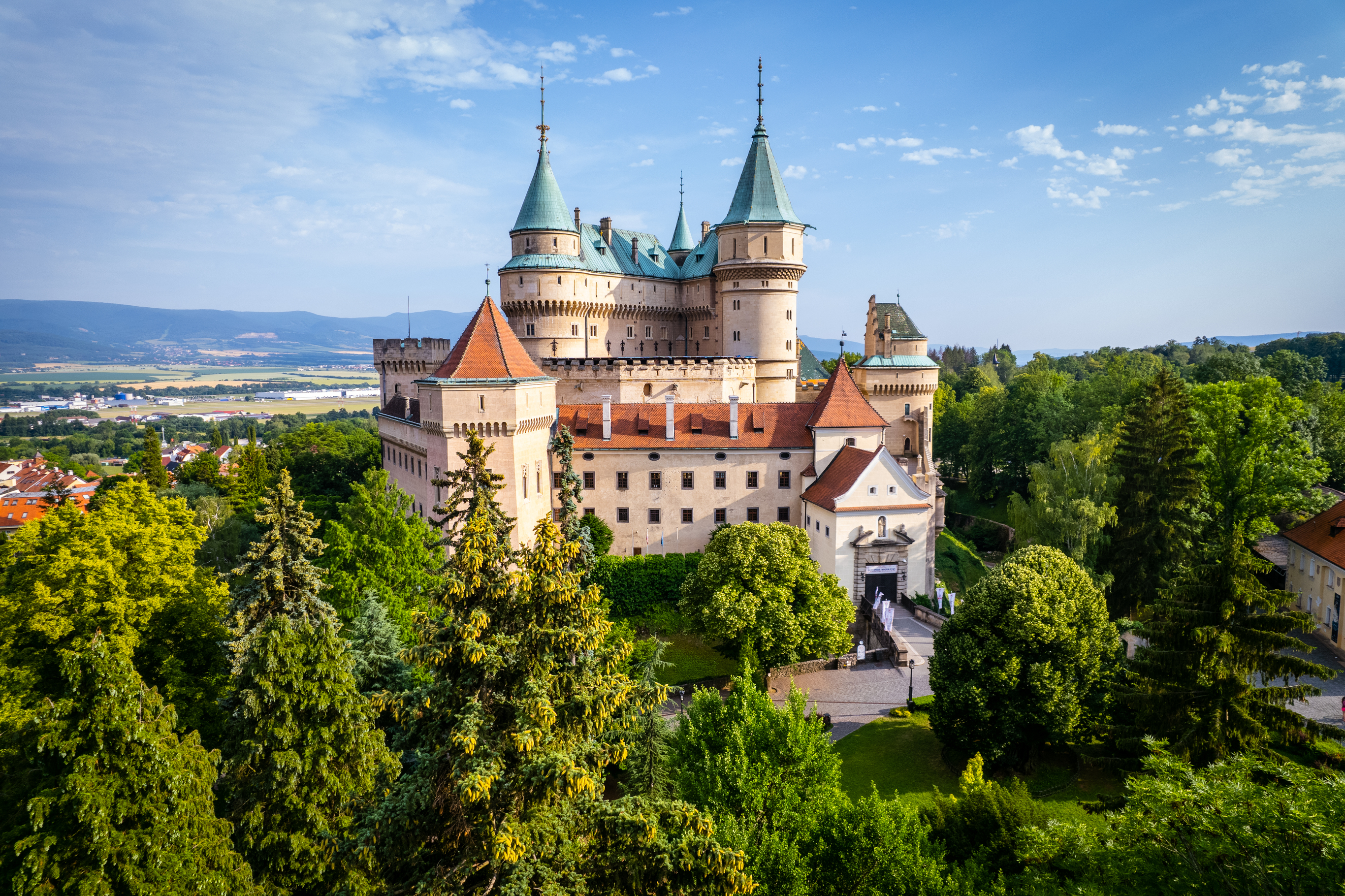
Bojnice Castle

Tourism is one of the main sectors of the Slovakia's economy, although still underserved. It is based on domestic tourism, as most of the tourists are the Slovak nationals and residents travelling for leisure within the country. Slovakia features natural landscapes, mountains, caves, medieval castles and towns, folk architecture, spas and ski resorts. More than 5,4 million tourists visited Slovakia in 2017. The most attractive destinations are the capital of Bratislava and the High Tatras. Most visitors come from the Czech Republic (about 26%), Poland (15%) and Germany (11%).

Slovakia contains many castles, most of which are in ruins. The best known castles include Bojnice Castle (often used as a filming location), Spiš Castle, (on the UNESCO list), Orava Castle, Bratislava Castle, and the ruins of Devín Castle. Čachtice Castle was once the home of the world's most prolific female serial killer, the 'Bloody Lady', Elizabeth Báthory.

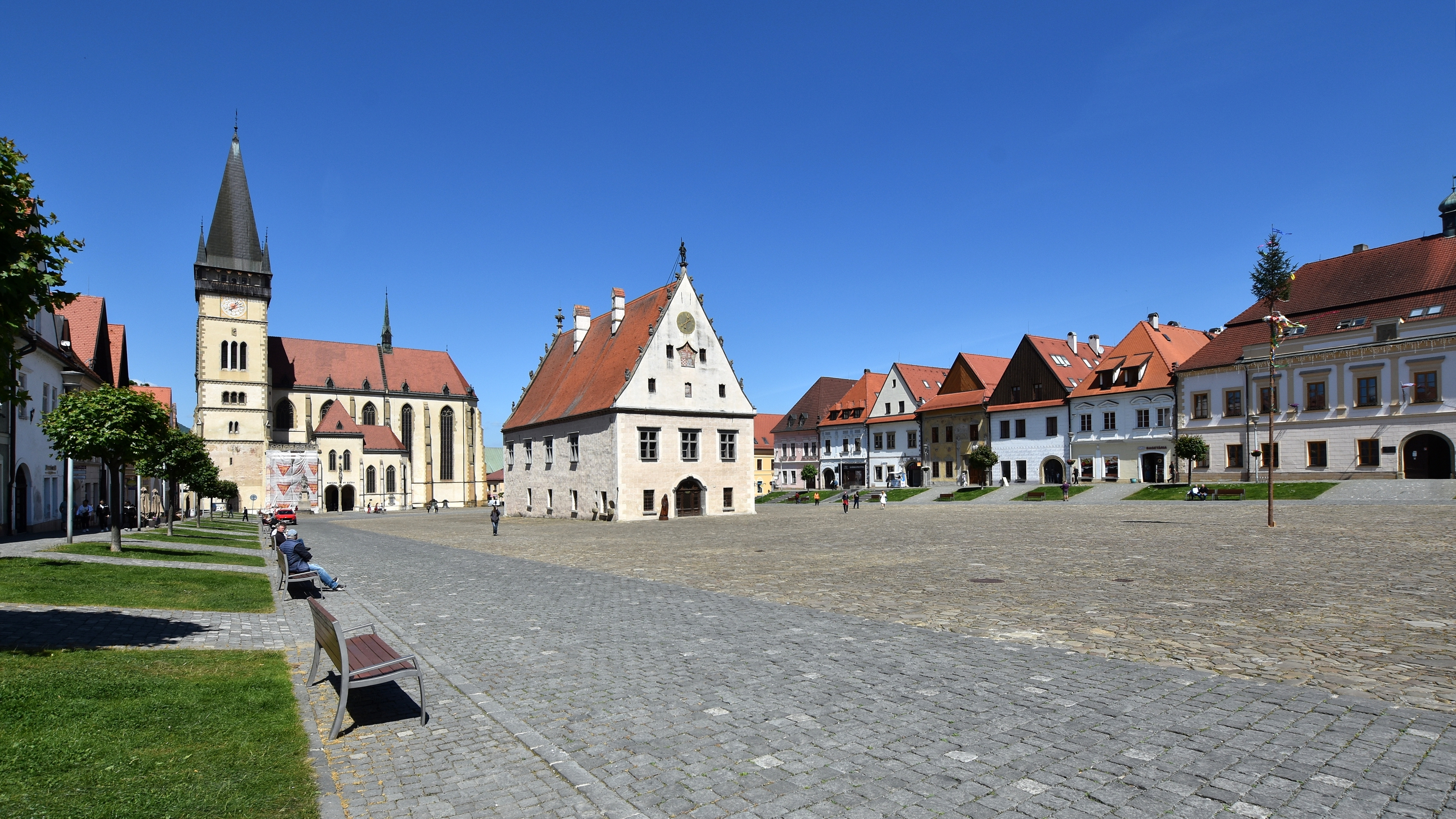
The centre of Bardejov – a UNESCO World Heritage Site

Slovakia's position in Europe and the country's past (part of the Kingdom of Hungary, the Habsburg monarchy and Czechoslovakia) made many cities and towns similar to the cities in the Czech Republic (such as Prague), Austria (such as Salzburg) or Hungary (such as Budapest). A historical centre with at least one square has been preserved in many towns. Large historical centres can be found in Bratislava, Trenčín, Košice, Banská Štiavnica, Levoča, and Trnava. Historical centres have been going through a restoration in recent years.

Historical churches can be found in virtually every village and town in Slovakia. Most of them are built in the Baroque style, but there are also many examples of Romanesque and Gothic architecture, for example Banská Bystrica, Bardejov and Spišská Kapitula. The Basilica of St. James in Levoča with the tallest wood-carved altar in the world and the Church of the Holy Spirit in Žehra with medieval frescos are UNESCO World Heritage Sites. The St. Martin's Concathedral in Bratislava served as the coronation church for the Kingdom of Hungary. The oldest sacral buildings in Slovakia stem from the Great Moravian period in the ninth century.

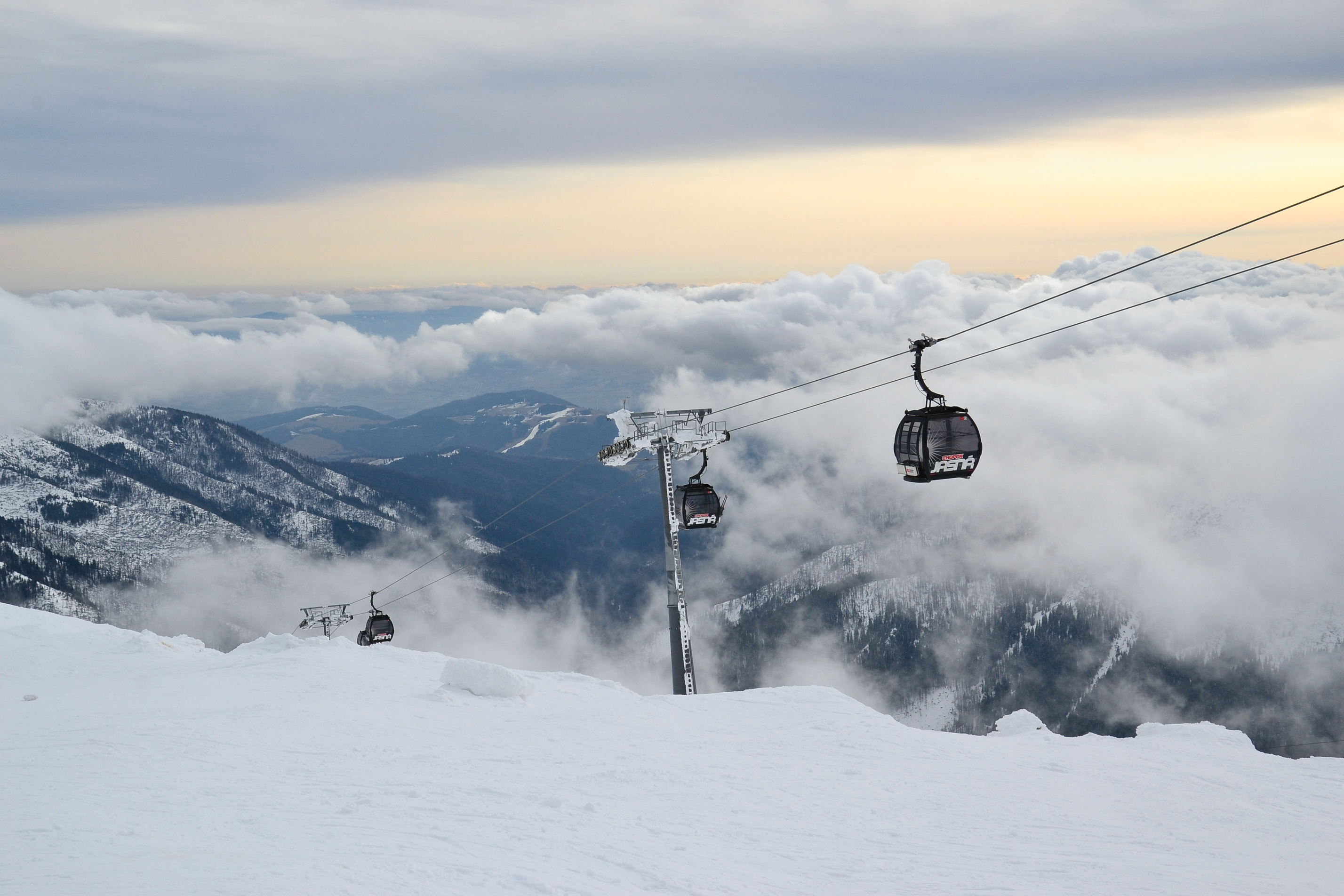
Cable cars at Jasná in the Tatra Mountains

Very precious structures are the complete wooden churches of northern and northern-eastern Slovakia. Most were built from the 15th century onwards by Catholics, Lutherans and members of eastern-rite churches.

There are many castles located throughout the country. Among the tourists, some of the most popular are Bojnice Castle, Spiš Castle, Stará Ľubovňa Castle, Krásna Hôrka Castle, Orava Castle (where many scenes of Nosferatu were filmed), Trenčín Castle, and Bratislava Castle, and also castles in ruins, such as Beckov Castle, Devín Castle, Šariš Castle, Považie Castle, and Strečno Castle (where Dragonheart was filmed).

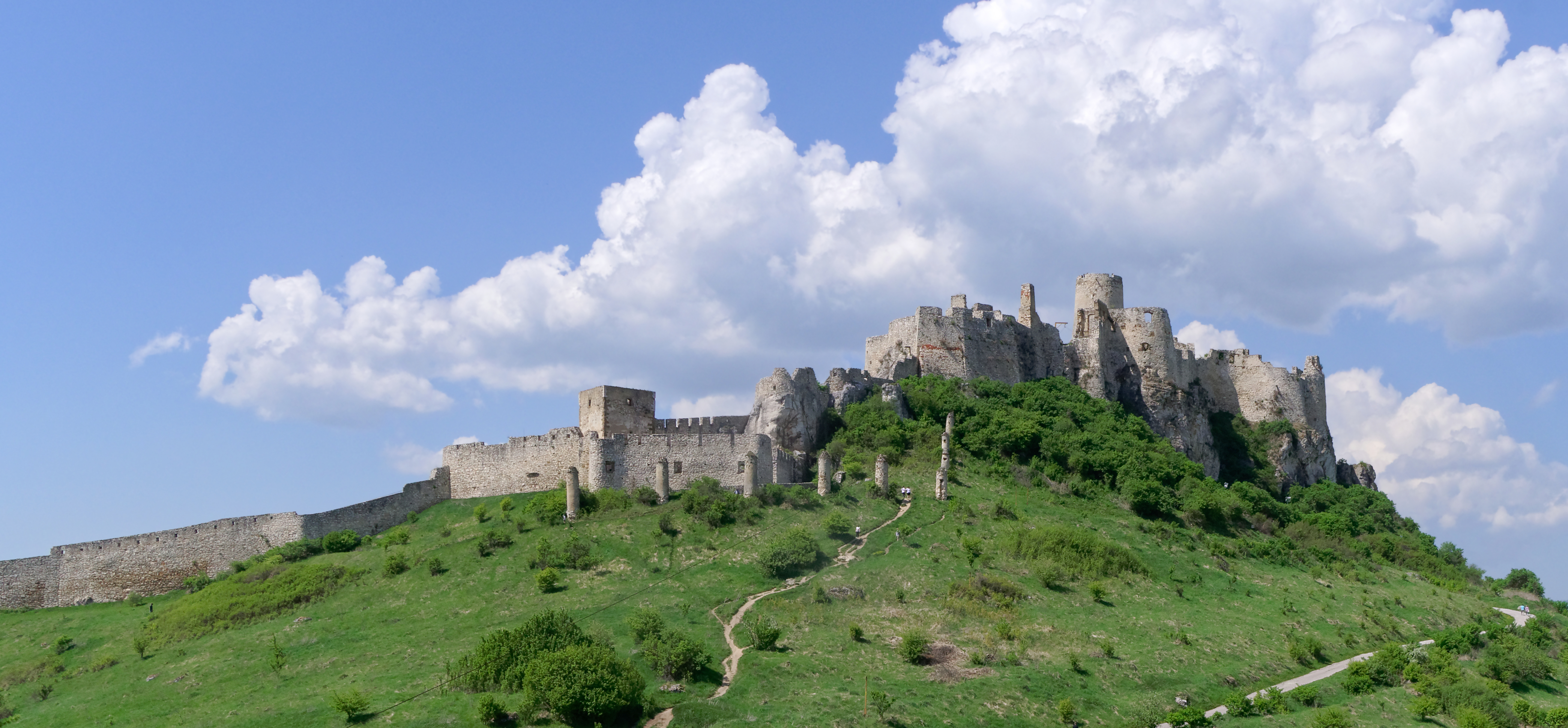
Spiš Castle

Slovakia is also known for its numerous spas. Piešťany is the biggest and busiest spa town in the country, attracting many visitors from the Gulf countries, mostly the United Arab Emirates, Qatar, Kuwait, and Bahrain. Bardejov, Trenčianske Teplice, Turčianske Teplice, and Rajecké Teplice are other major spa towns. Some well-known minor spa towns and villages are Štós, Číž, Dudince, Kováčová, Nimnica, Smrdáky, Lúčky, and Vyšné Ružbachy, among others.

Typical souvenirs from Slovakia are dolls dressed in folk costumes, ceramic objects, crystal glass, carved wooden figures, črpáks (wooden pitchers), fujaras (a folk instrument on the UNESCO list) and valaškas (a decorated folk hatchet) and above all products made from corn husks and wire, notably human figures. Souvenirs can be bought in the shops run by the state organisation ÚĽUV (Ústredie ľudovej umeleckej výroby—Centre of Folk Art Production).

=== Science ===
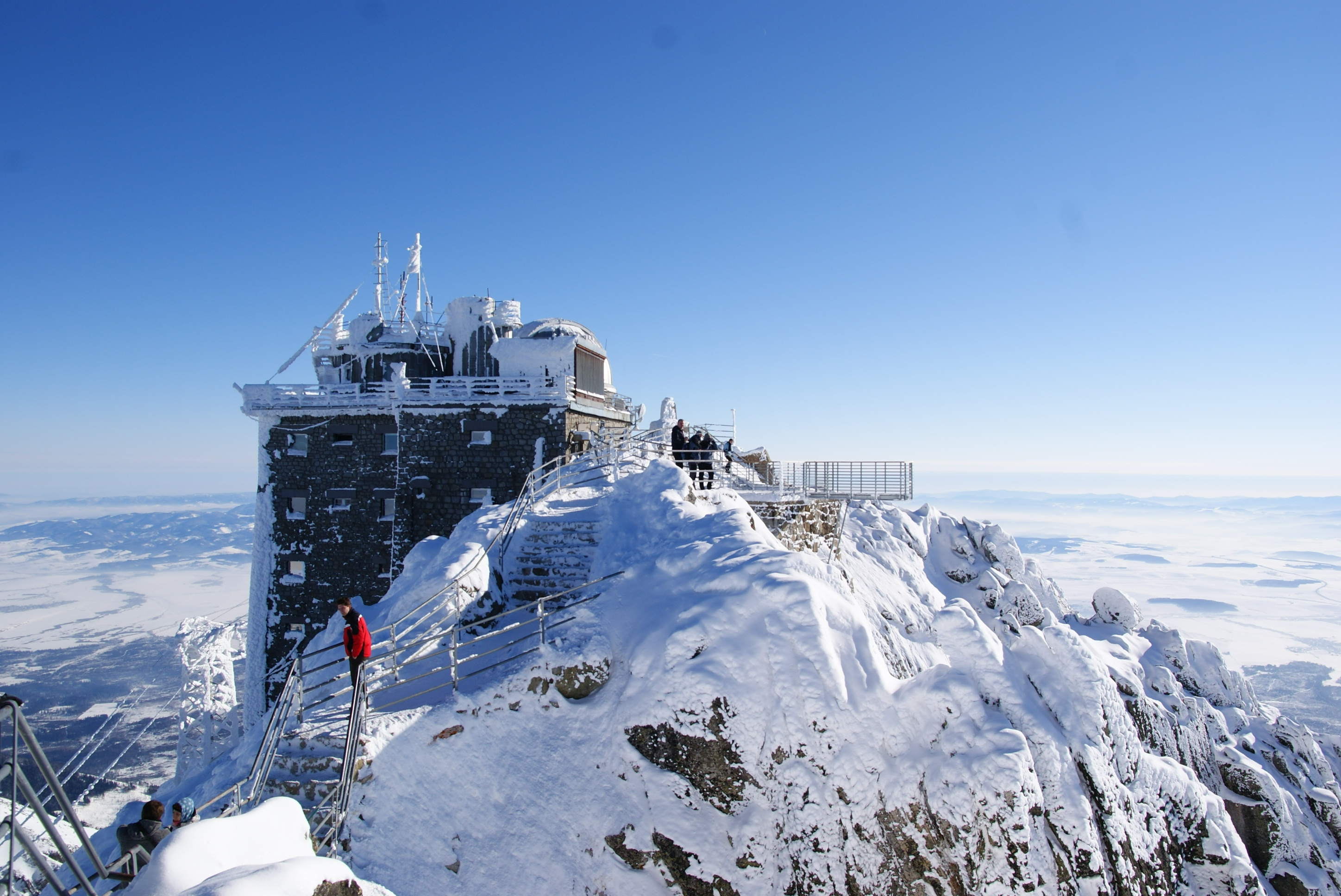
Observatory at the top of the peak Lomnický štít, at the altitude above sea level of 2,632 m (8,635 ft).

The Slovak Academy of Sciences has been the most important scientific and research institution in the country since 1953. Slovaks have made notable scientific and technical contributions during history. In 1999, astronaut Ivan Bella, became the first and only Slovak citizen to fly in space.

Observer status to European Space Agency (ESA) was granted in 2010, when Slovakia signed the General Agreement on Cooperation in which information about ongoing education programmes was shared and Slovakia was invited to various negotiations of the ESA. In 2015, Slovakia signed the European Cooperating State Agreement based on which Slovakia committed to the finance entrance programme named PECS (Plan for the European Cooperating States) which serves as preparation for full membership. Slovak research and development organisations can apply for funding of projects regarding space technologies advancement. Slovakia became European Space Agency associate member state in 2022. In 2024, the country signed the Artemis Accords with NASA.

Slovakia was ranked 47th in the Global Innovation Index in 2025.

== Demographics ==
Population statistic (10 years)
Year	1995	2005	2015	2025
Count	5,367,790	5,389,180	5,426,252	5,409,407
Difference		+0.39%	+0.68%	−0.31%

Population statistic
Year	2024	2025
Count	5,419,451	5,409,407
Difference		−0.18%

Largest cities or towns in Slovakia Štatistický úrad Slovenskej republiky – 1 January 2021
Rank	Name	Region	Pop.	Rank	Name	Region	Pop.
1	Bratislava	Bratislava	475,503	11	Prievidza	Trenčín	45,017
2	Košice	Košice	229,040	12	Zvolen	Banská Bystrica	40,637
3	Prešov	Prešov	84,824	13	Považská Bystrica	Trenčín	38,641
4	Žilina	Žilina	82,656	14	Nové Zámky	Nitra	37,791
5	Nitra	Nitra	78,489	15	Michalovce	Košice	36,704
6	Banská Bystrica	Banská Bystrica	76 018	16	Spišská Nová Ves	Košice	35,431
7	Trnava	Trnava	63,803	17	Komárno	Nitra	32,967
8	Trenčín	Trenčín	54,740	18	Levice	Nitra	31,974
9	Martin	Žilina	52,520	19	Humenné	Prešov	31,359
10	Poprad	Prešov	49,855	20	Bardejov	Prešov	30,840

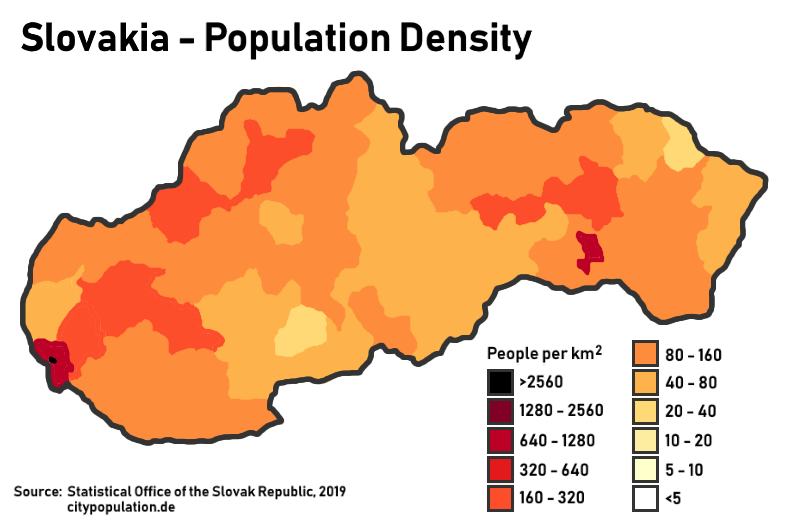
Population density in Slovakia. The two biggest cities are clearly visible, Bratislava in the far west and Košice in the east.

The population is over 5.4 million and consists mostly of Slovaks. The average population density is 110 inhabitants per km^{2}. According to the 2021 census, the majority of the inhabitants of Slovakia are Slovaks (83.8%). Hungarians are the largest ethnic minority (7.8%). Other ethnic groups include Roma (1.2%), Czechs (0.5%), Rusyns (0.4%) and others (1.9) or unspecified (5.4%).

In 2024, the median age of the Slovak population was 42.8 years.

The largest waves of Slovak emigration occurred in the 19th and early 20th centuries. In the 1990 US census, 1.8 million people self-identified as having Slovak ancestry.

In the 2024 Global Hunger Index, Slovakia is one of 22 countries with a GHI score of less than 5.

=== Languages ===
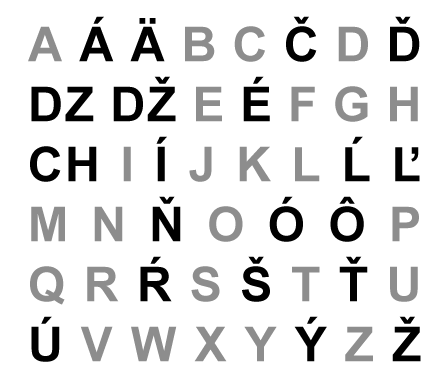
The Slovak alphabet has 46 letters, of which 3 are digraphs and 18 contain diacritics.

The official language is Slovak, a member of the Slavic language family. Hungarian is widely spoken in the southern regions, and Rusyn is used in some parts of the Northeast. Minority languages hold co-official status in the municipalities in which the size of the minority population meets the legal threshold of 15% in two consecutive censuses.

Slovakia is ranked among the top EU countries regarding the knowledge of foreign languages. In 2007, 68% of the population aged from 25 to 64 years claimed to speak two or more foreign languages, finishing second highest in the European Union. The best known foreign language in Slovakia is Czech. Eurostat report also shows that 98.3% of Slovak students in the upper secondary education take on two foreign languages, ranking highly over the average 60.1% in the European Union. According to a Eurobarometer survey from 2012, 26% of the population have knowledge of English at a conversational level, followed by German (22%) and Russian (17%).

The deaf community uses the Slovak Sign Language.

=== Religion ===
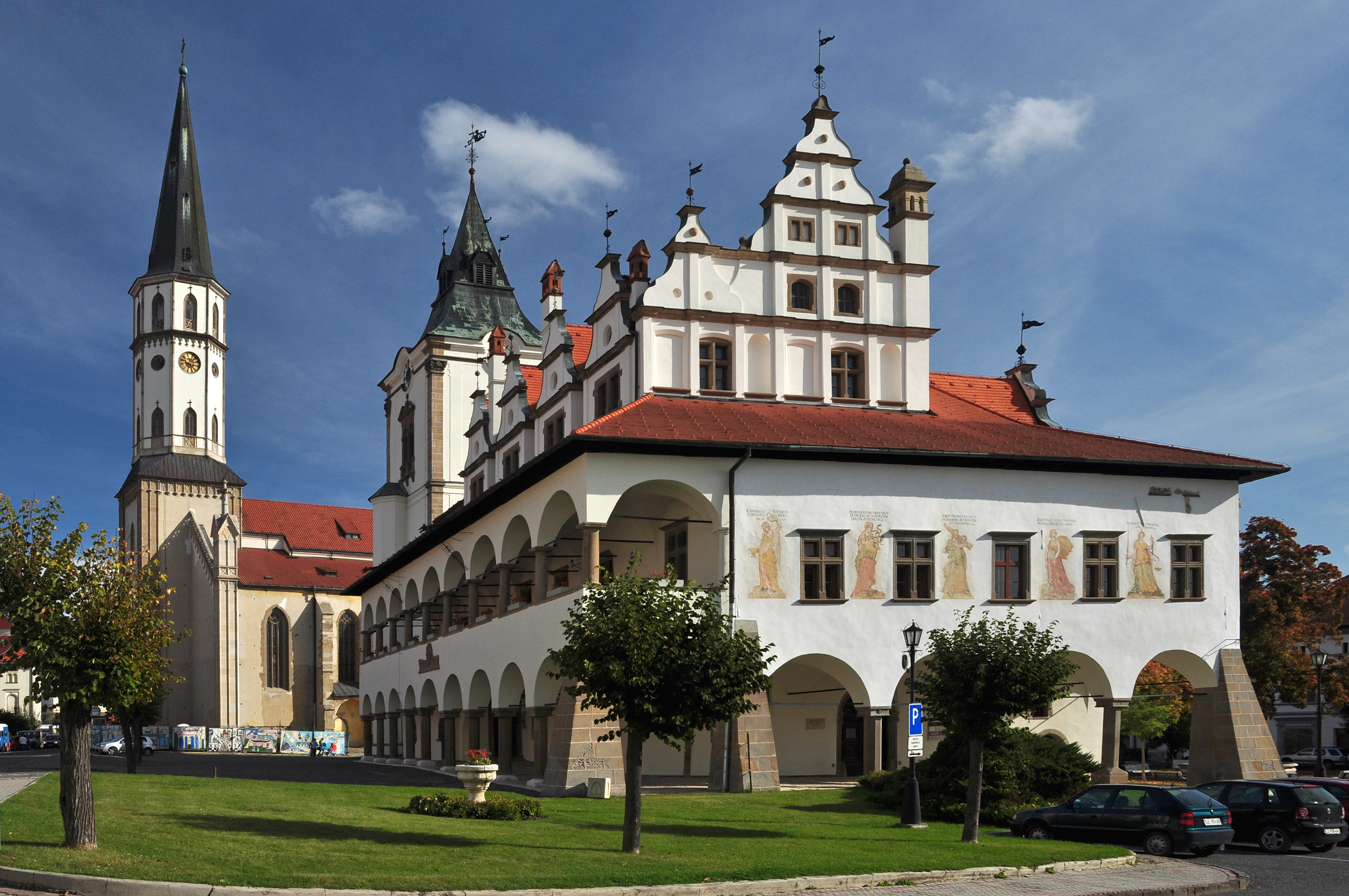
Basilica of St. James in Levoča

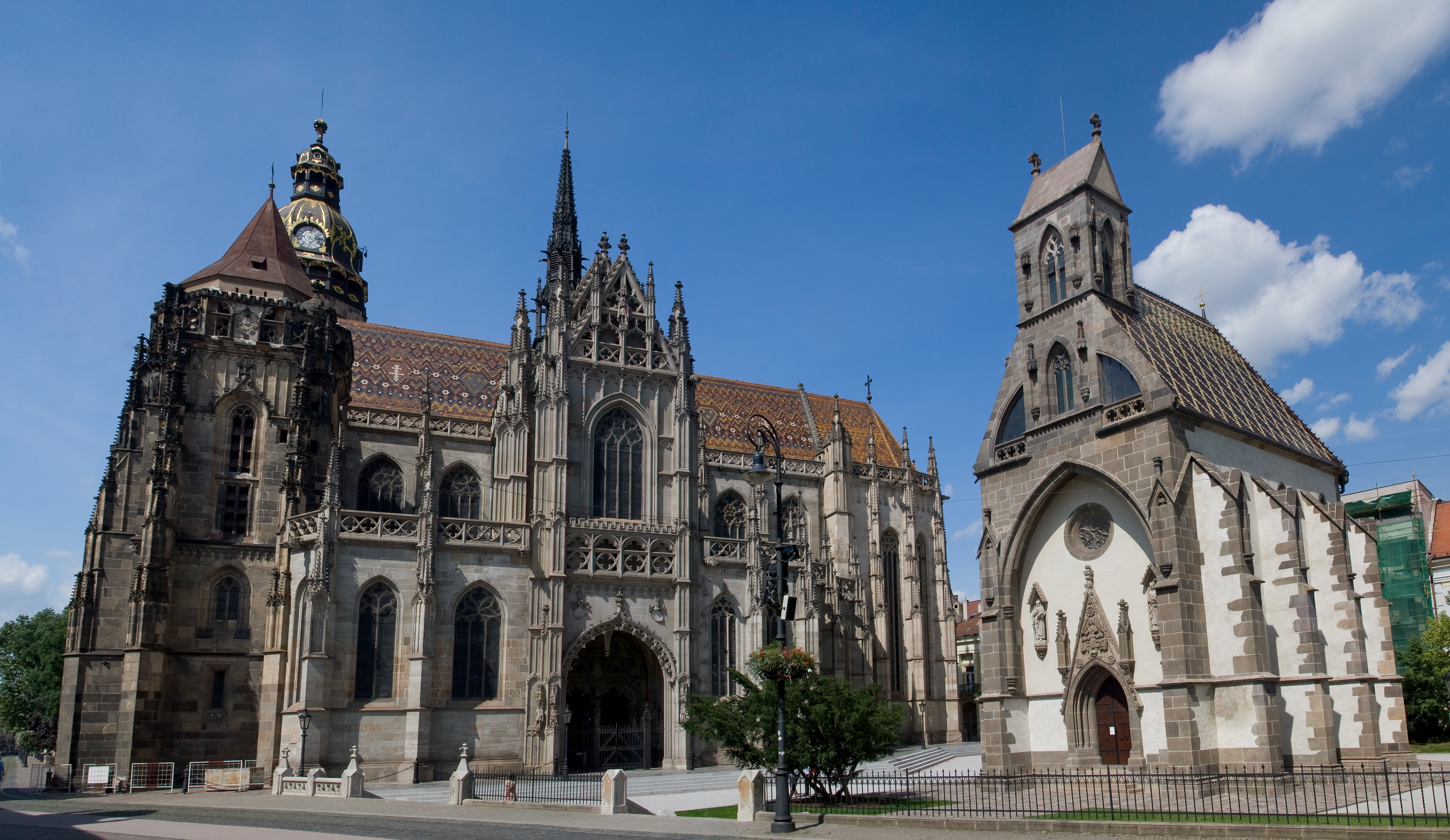
St. Elisabeth Cathedral in Košice, the largest church in Slovakia

The Slovak constitution guarantees freedom of religion. In 2021, 55.8% of population identified themselves as Catholics (Latin Church), 5.3% as Lutherans, 1.6% as Calvinists, 4% as Greek Catholics, 0.9% as Orthodox, 23.8% identified themselves as atheists or non-religious, and 6.5% did not answer the question about their belief. In 2004, about one third of the church members regularly attended church services. The Slovak Greek Catholic Church is an Eastern rite sui iuris Catholic Church. Before World War II, an estimated 90,000 Jews lived in Slovakia (1.6% of the population), but most were murdered during the Holocaust. After further reductions due to postwar emigration and assimilation, only about 2,300 Jews remain today (0.04% of the population).

There are 18 state-registered religions in Slovakia, of which 16 are Christian, one is Jewish, and one is the Baháʼí Faith. In 2016, a two-thirds majority of the Slovak parliament passed a new bill that would obstruct Islam and other religious organisations from becoming state-recognised religions by doubling the minimum followers threshold from 25,000 to 50,000; however, Slovakia's then-president Andrej Kiska vetoed the bill. In 2010, there were an estimated 5,000 Muslims in Slovakia representing less than 0.1% of the country's population. Slovakia is the only member state of the European Union to not have any mosques.

=== Education ===
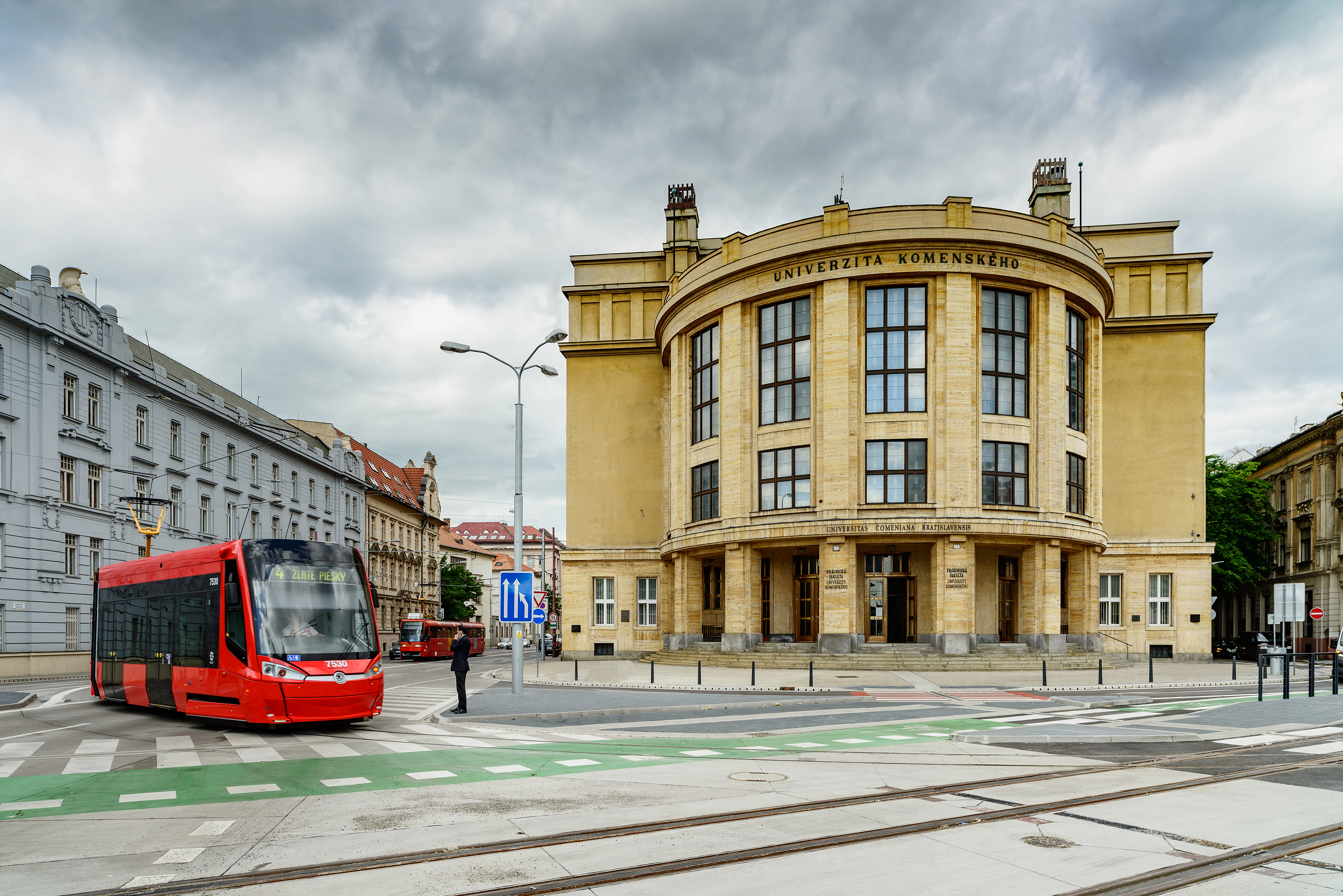
Comenius University headquarters in Bratislava

Education in Slovakia is compulsory from age 6 to 16. Primary school in Slovakia lasts for nine years, which is divided into two parts, the first stage (age 6–10) and the second stage (age 10–15), which is finished by taking nationwide testing called Monitor (in Slovak language and math).

For most students, secondary education (high school) lasts four years, from ages 15 to 19. This is the typical length for students who complete the full nine years of primary school and then enroll in a secondary school. High school is finished by school-leaving exam called Maturita, or Maturitná skúška. The Programme for International Student Assessment, coordinated by the OECD, currently ranks Slovak secondary education the 30th in the world (placing it just below the United States and just above Spain).

After finishing high school, students can go to university. Slovakia has a wide range of universities. The biggest university is Comenius University, established in 1919. Although it is not the first university ever established on Slovak territory, it is the oldest university that is still running. Most universities in Slovakia are public funded, where anyone can apply. Every citizen has a right to free education in public schools. The country has also several privately funded universities. Anyone can apply to any number of universities.

=== Health ===
The Slovak healthcare system faces significant structural challenges characterized by a chronic shortage of medical professionals. According to the European Observatory on Health Systems and Policies, the technical state of many public hospitals requires extensive modernization to meet contemporary European standards. The country continues to rank among the region's highest in per capita pure alcohol consumption. Behavioral risk factors, led by alcohol abuse, are associated with roughly 30% of total mortality.

== Culture ==
=== Folk tradition ===
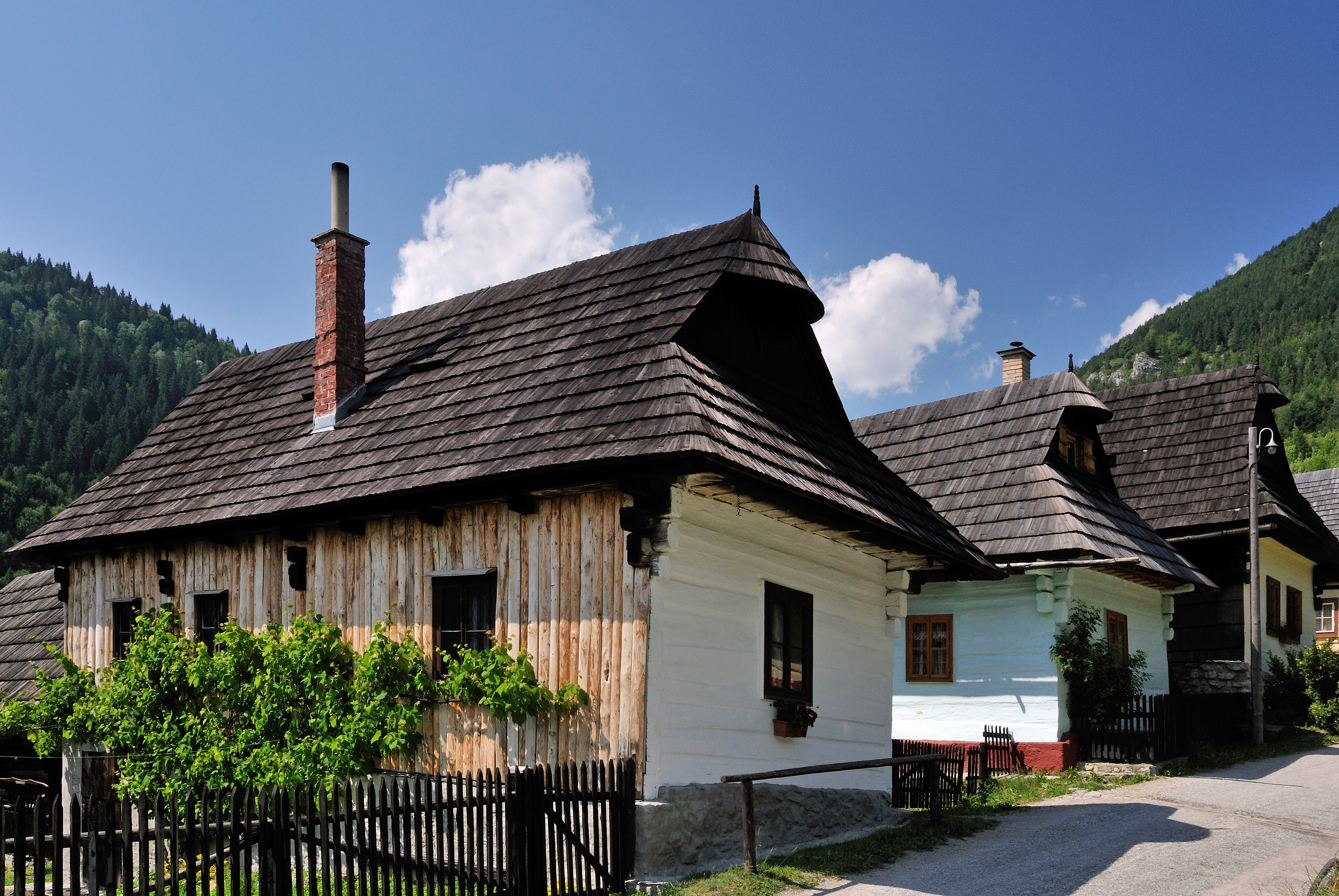
Wooden folk architecture can be seen in the well-preserved village of Vlkolínec, a UNESCO World Heritage Site.

Folk tradition has rooted strongly in Slovakia and is reflected in literature, music, dance and architecture. The prime example is the Slovak national anthem, "Nad Tatrou sa blýska", which is based on a melody from the "Kopala studienku" folk song.

The manifestation of Slovak folklore culture is the "Východná" Folklore Festival. It is the oldest and largest nationwide festival with international participation, which takes place in Východná annually. Slovakia is usually represented by many groups but mainly by SĽUK (Slovenský ľudový umelecký kolektív—Slovak folk art collective). SĽUK is the largest Slovak folk art group, trying to preserve the folklore tradition.

An example of wooden folk architecture in Slovakia can be seen in the well-preserved village of Vlkolínec which has been the UNESCO World Heritage Site since 1993. The Prešov Region preserves the world's most remarkable folk wooden churches. Most of them are protected by Slovak law as cultural heritage, but some of them are on the UNESCO list too, in Bodružal, Hervartov, Ladomirová and Ruská Bystrá.

The best known Slovak hero, found in many folk mythologies, is Juraj Jánošík (1688–1713) (the Slovak equivalent of Robin Hood). The legend says he was taking from the rich and giving to the poor. Jánošík's life was depicted in a list of literary works and many movies throughout the 20th century. One of the most popular is a film Jánošík directed by Martin Frič in 1935. He is commemorated mainly in Terchová, his family's place of living.

=== Art ===
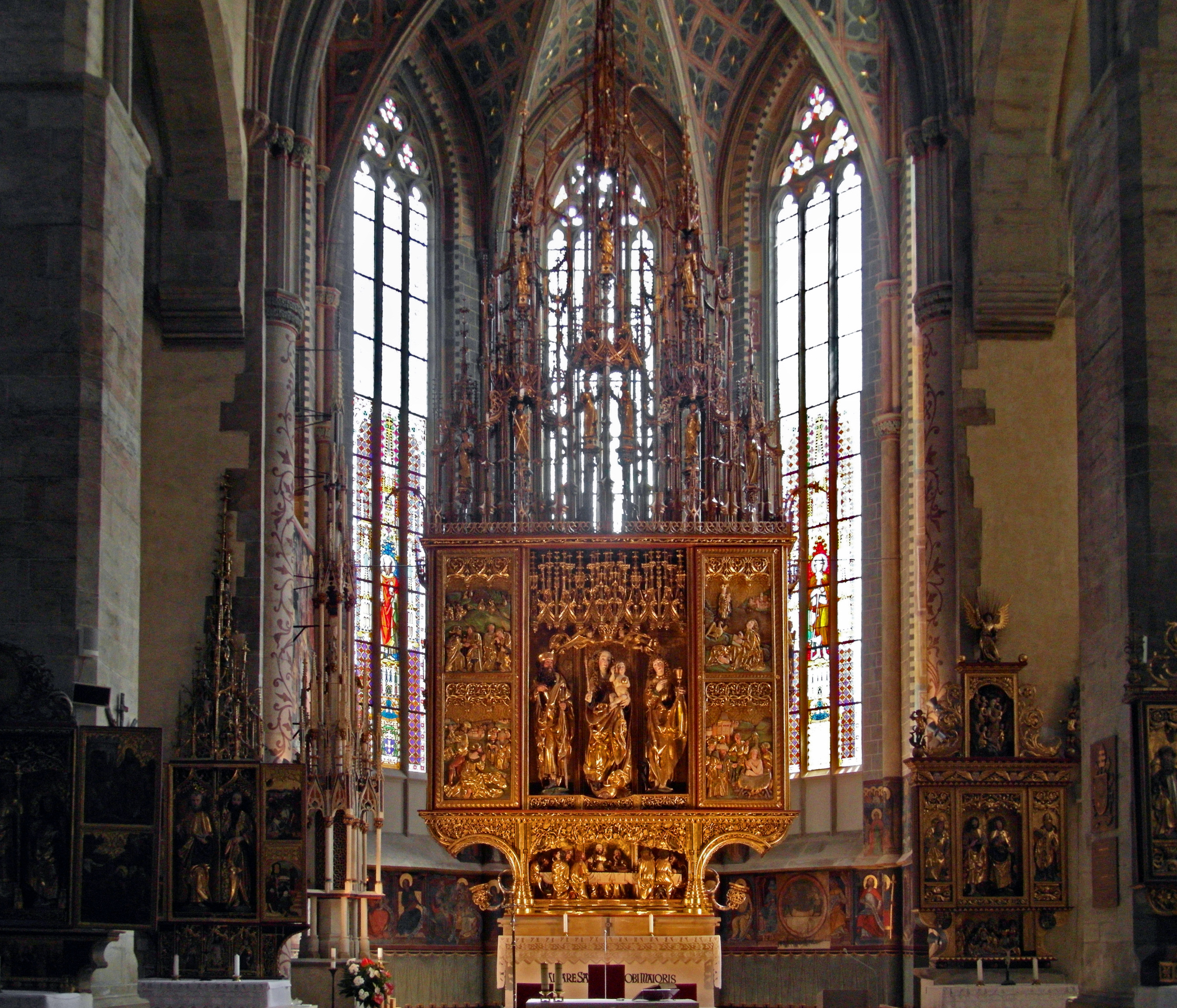
Main altar in the Basilica of St. James, crafted by Master Paul of Levoča, 1517. It is the tallest wooden altar in the world

Visual art in Slovakia is represented through painting, drawing, printmaking, illustration, arts and crafts, sculpture, photography or conceptual art. The Slovak National Gallery founded in 1948, is the biggest network of galleries in Slovakia. Two displays in Bratislava are situated in Esterházy Palace (Esterházyho palác) and the Water Barracks (Vodné kasárne), adjacent one to another. They are located on the Danube riverfront in the Old Town.

The Bratislava City Gallery, founded in 1961 is the second biggest Slovak gallery of its kind. It stores about 35,000 pieces of Slovak international art and offers permanent displays in Pálffy Palace and Mirbach Palace, located in the Old Town. Danubiana Art Museum, one of the youngest art museums in Europe, is situated near Čunovo waterworks (part of Gabčíkovo Waterworks). Other major galleries include: Andy Warhol Museum of Modern Art (Warhol's parents were from Miková), East Slovak Gallery, Ernest Zmeták Art Gallery, Zvolen Castle.

=== Literature ===
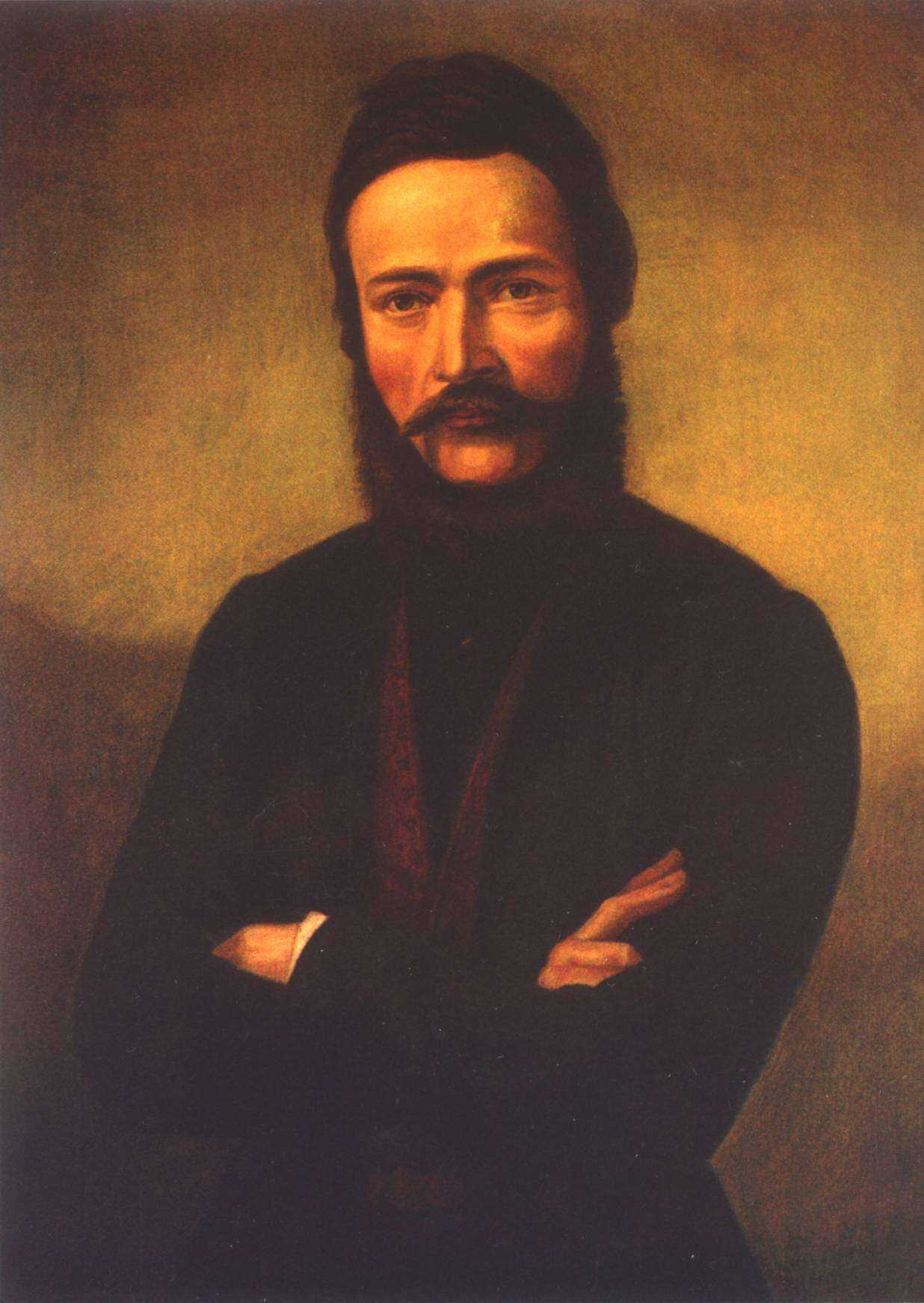
Ľudovít Štúr codified the Slovak standard language.

Christian topics include poem Proglas as a foreword to the four Gospels, partial translations of the Bible into Old Church Slavonic, Zakon sudnyj ljudem.

Medieval literature, in the period from the 11th to the 15th centuries, was written in Latin, Czech and Slovakised Czech. Lyric (prayers, songs and formulas) was still controlled by the Church, while epic was concentrated on legends. Authors from this period include Johannes de Thurocz, author of the Chronica Hungarorum and Maurus, both of them Hungarians. The worldly literature also emerged and chronicles were written in this period.

Two leading persons codified Slovak. The first was Anton Bernolák, whose concept was based on the western Slovak dialect in 1787. It was the codification of the first-ever literary language of Slovaks. The second was Ľudovít Štúr, whose formation of the Slovak took principles from the central Slovak dialect in 1843.

Slovakia is also known for its polyhistors, of whom include Pavol Jozef Šafárik, Matej Bel, Ján Kollár, and its political revolutionaries and reformists, such Milan Rastislav Štefánik and Alexander Dubček.

=== Cuisine ===
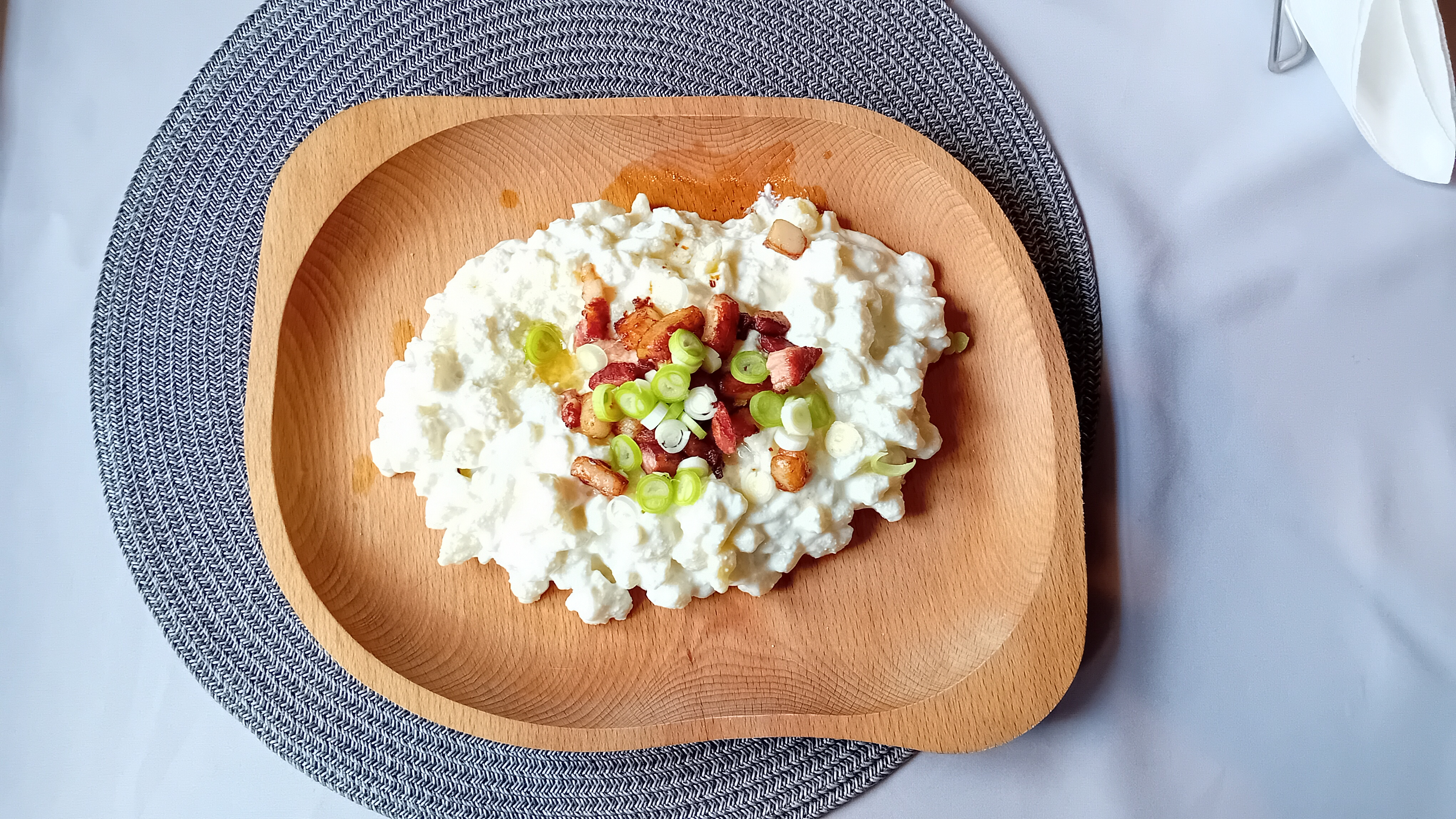
Bryndzové halušky, one of the national dishes in Slovakia

Traditional Slovak cuisine is based mainly on pork, poultry (chicken is the most widely eaten, followed by duck, goose, and turkey), flour, potatoes, cabbage, and milk products. It is relatively closely related to Hungarian, Czech, Polish and Austrian cuisine. On the east it is also influenced by Ukrainian, including Lemko and Rusyn. In comparison with other European countries, "game meat" is more accessible in Slovakia due to vast resources of forest and because hunting is relatively popular. Boar, rabbit, and venison are generally available throughout the year. Lamb and goat are eaten but are not widely popular.

The traditional Slovak meals are bryndzové halušky, bryndzové pirohy and other meals with potato dough and bryndza. Bryndza is a salty cheese made of sheep milk, characterised by a strong taste and aroma. Bryndzové halušky especially is considered a national dish, and is very commonly found on the menu of traditional Slovak restaurants.

A typical soup is a sauerkraut soup ("kapustnica"). A blood sausage called "krvavnica", made from any parts of a butchered pig, is also a specific Slovak meal.

Wine is enjoyed throughout Slovakia. Slovak wine comes predominantly from the southern areas along the Danube and its tributaries; the northern half of the country is too cold and mountainous to grow grapevines. Traditionally, white wine was more popular than red or rosé (except in some regions), and sweet wine more popular than dry; however, in recent years tastes seem to be changing. Beer (mainly of the pilsener style, though dark lagers are also consumed) is also popular.

=== Sport ===
Sporting activities are practised widely in Slovakia, many of them on a professional level. Ice hockey and football have traditionally been regarded as the most popular sports in Slovakia, though tennis, handball, basketball, volleyball, whitewater slalom, cycling, alpine skiing, biathlon and athletics are also popular.

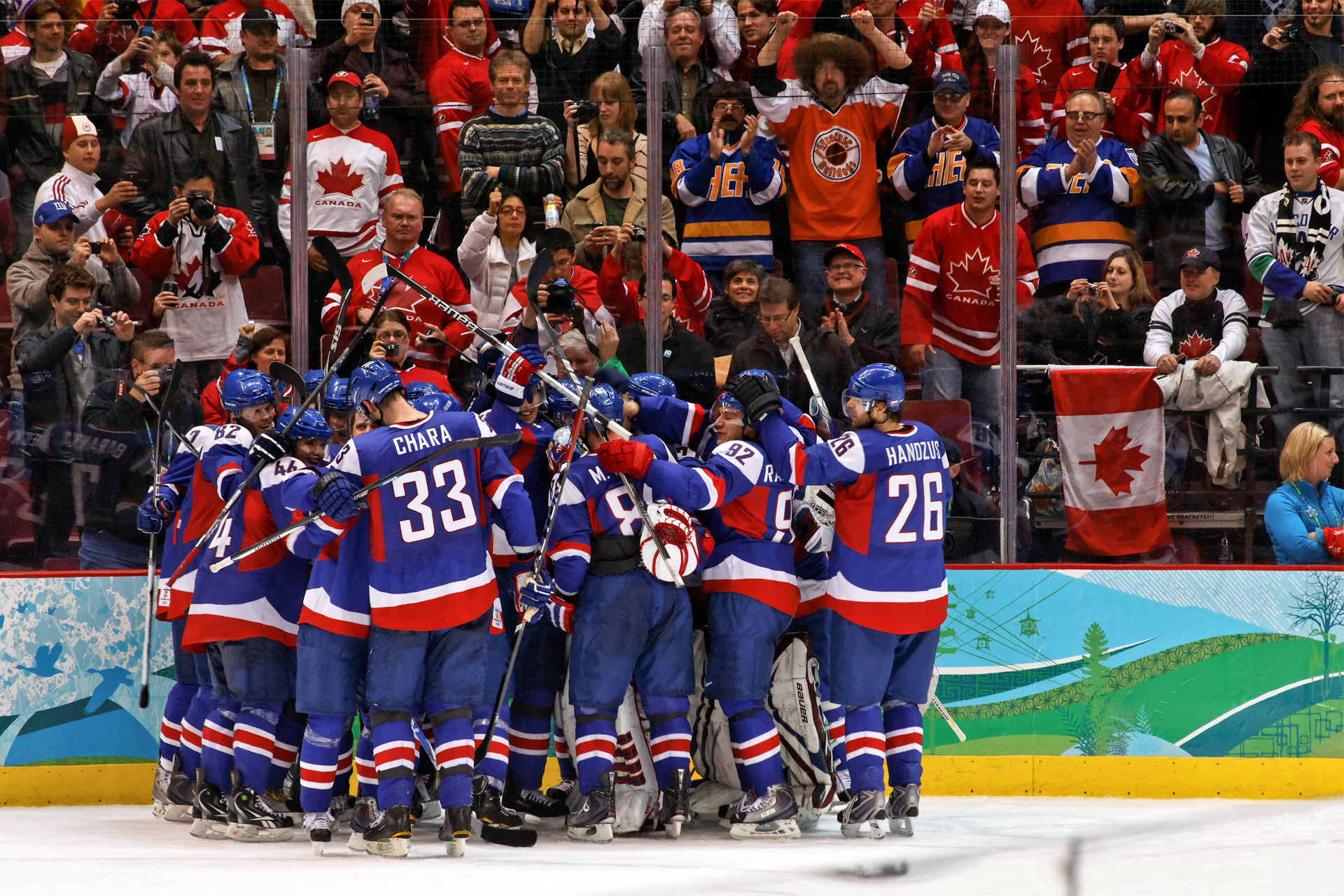
The Slovak national ice hockey team celebrating a victory against Sweden at the 2010 Winter Olympics

One of the most popular team sports in Slovakia is ice hockey. Slovakia became a member of the IIHF on 2 February 1993. Since then, the team has won four medals in Ice Hockey World Championships, consisting of one gold, two silver and a bronze. The most recent success was a silver medal at the 2012 IIHF World Championship in Helsinki. The Slovak national hockey team made eight appearances in the Olympic games, finishing fourth in the 2010 Winter Olympics in Vancouver and third with bronze medal at the 2022 Winter Olympics in Beijing. The country has 8,280 registered players and is ranked seventh in the IIHF World Ranking at present. The Slovak hockey teams HC Slovan Bratislava and HC Lev Poprad participated in the Kontinental Hockey League.

Slovakia hosted the 2011 IIHF World Championship, where Finland won the gold medal and 2019 IIHF World Championship, where Finland also won the gold medal. Both competitions took place in Bratislava and Košice.

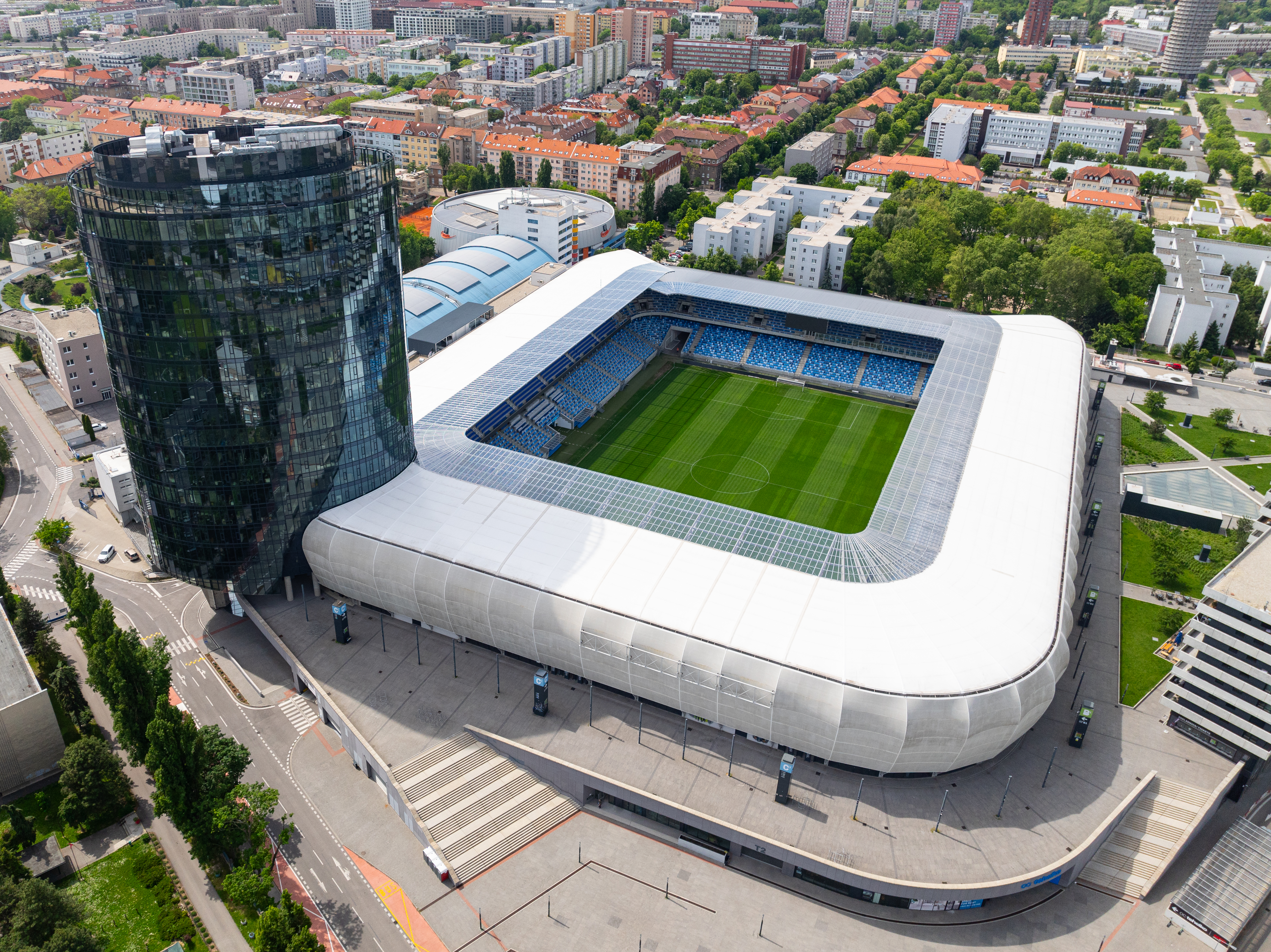
National football stadium in Bratislava

Football is the most popular sport in Slovakia, with over 400,000 registered players. Since 1993, the Slovak national football team has qualified for the FIFA World Cup once, in 2010. They progressed to the last 16, where they were defeated by the Netherlands. The most notable result was the 3–2 victory over Italy. In 2015, the Slovak national football team qualified for the UEFA Euro 2016 tournament, under head coach Ján Kozák. This helped the team reach its best-ever position of 14th in the FIFA World Rankings.

In club competitions, only three teams have qualified for the UEFA Champions League Group Stage, namely MFK Košice in 1997–98, FC Artmedia Bratislava in 2005–06 season, and MŠK Žilina in 2010–11. FC Artmedia Bratislava has been the most successful team, finishing third at the Group Stage of the UEFA Cup, therefore qualifying for the knockout stage. They remain the only Slovak club that has won a match at the group stage.

== See also ==
- Outline of Slovakia

== Bibliography ==
- Julius Bartl et al., Slovak History: Chronology & Lexicon. Wauconda, IL: Bolchazy-Carducci Publishers, 2002.
- Olga Drobna, Eduard Drobny, and Magdalena Gocnikova, Slovakia: The Heart of Europe. Wauconda, IL: Bolchazy-Carducci Publishers, 1996.
- Pavel Dvorak, The Early History of Slovakia in Images. Budmerice, Slovakia: Vydavatel'stvo Rak Budmerice, 2006.
- Sharon Fisher, Political Change in Post-Communist Slovakia and Croatia: From Nationalist to Europeanist. New York: Palgrave Macmillan, 2006.
- Karen Henderson, Slovakia: The Escape from Invisibility. London: Routledge, 2002.
- Rob Humphrey, The Rough Guide to the Czech and Slovak Republics. New York: Rough Guides, 2006.
- Michael Jacobs, Blue Guide: Czech and Slovak Republics. London: A.&C. Black, 1999.
- Owen V. Johnson, Slovakia 1918–1938: Education and the Making of a Nation. Boulder, CO: East European Monographs, 1985.
- Lil Junas, My Slovakia: An American's View. Martin, Slovakia: Vydavatelśtvo Matice slovenskej, 2001.
- Stanislav Kirschbaum, A History of Slovakia: The Struggle for Survival. New York: St. Martin's Press, 1995.
- Eugen Lazistan, Fedor Mikovič, Ivan Kučma, and Anna Jurečková, Slovakia: A Photographic Odyssey. Wauconda, IL: Bolchazy-Carducci Publishers, 2001.
- Elena Mannová, A Concise History of Slovakia. Bratislava: Historický ústav SAV, 2000.
- Anton Spiesz and Dusan Caplovic, Illustrated Slovak History: A Struggle for Sovereignty in Central Europe. Wauconda, IL : Bolchazy-Carducci Publishers, 2001.
