= Oskar Ewald =

Hungarian-Austrian philosopher (1881–1940)

Oskar Ewald (Austrian German: [ˈeːvald]; born Oskar Friedländer; 11 November 1881, Búrszentgyörgy/Sankt Georgen, Hungary (now Borský Svätý Jur, Senica District, Slovakia) – 25 September 1940, near Oxford, Oxfordshire) was a Hungarian-Austrian philosopher.

His father was Moritz Friedländer, a liberal scholar of Judaism who worked with the Jewish community of the Kingdom of Hungary on matters including the expansion of education.

Beginning in 1901, Ewald was a member of a group of young intellectuals in Vienna, Die Männer der Zukunft. In addition to Ewald, this group included Otto Weininger, Arthur Gerber, Moritz Rappaport, Emil Lucka, and Hermann Swoboda.

Ewald converted to Protestantism and changed his last name to Ewald.

== Works ==
- Nietzsches Lehre in ihren Grundbegriffen, 1903
- Gründe und Abgründe, 1909
- Die Erweckung, 1922
- Freidenkertum und Religion, 1920
