= Rohov =

Rohov can refer to

- Rohov (Opava District), a village in the Moravian-Silesian Region (Opava District) of the Czech Republic
- Rohov, Senica, a village in the Trnava Region (Senica District) of Slovakia
