= Moritz Friedländer =

Austro-Hungarian Jewish scholar of religion

Moritz Friedländer (October 17, 1844–January 30, 1919) was an Austro-Hungarian Jewish scholar of religion.

== Life ==
Moritz Friedländer was born in 1844 in Borský Svätý Jur, then part of Hungary in the Austro-Hungarian Empire (now part of Slovakia). He was educated at the University of Prague, where he also attended the Talmudic lectures of Prague's Chief Rabbi Solomon Judah Loeb Rapoport. His liberal views kept him from potentially becoming a rabbi himself. He taught for a brief period as a religious instructor at a high school in Vienna. After, he became secretary of the Israelitische Allianz zu Wien (Israelite Alliance of Vienna) in 1875. In 1881–82, he made several trips to Brody (then part of the Russian Empire) with a delegation from the Alliance Israélite Universelle of Paris to help Russian Jews emigrate to the United States. He published his impressions of the miserable condition of Russian Jews under the title "Fünf Wochen in Brody" (Five Weeks in Brody). In his work with the Allianz, he campaigned for the opening of the first Jewish public school in Galicia, which encountered resistance from the Haredi orthodox who preferred to keep the government uninvolved. His work in Galicia attracted the attention of Jewish philanthropist Maurice de Hirsch and his wife Clara, who helped fund the establishment of Jewish schools in the region, both boys schools and girls schools.

Friedländer married Rosalie Grünhut. Their son Oskar, born in 1881, would later become a philosopher, convert to Protestantism, and change his name to Oskar Ewald. Moritz Friedländer died in Vienna on January 10, 1919.

== Scholarship and work ==
Friedländer had a very admiring and positive view of Hellenistic Judaism, Judaism in the Hellenistic period after the conquests of Alexander the Great where it interacted with Greek culture and thought. He published several articles and works on the topic and saw the period as a useful model for Judaism in his own day. He also had an unusual interpretation of Paul of Tarsus; Friedländer saw Paul as exemplifying the values of universalism in Diaspora Judaism.

A partial list of his writing includes:

- Patristische und talmudische Studien. Hölder, Vienna 1878.
- Das Judenthum in der vorchristlichen griechischen Welt: ein Beitrag zur Entstehungsgeschichte des Christenthums. M. Breitenstein, Vienna / Leipzig 1897.
- Die religiösen Bewegungen innerhalb des Judentums im Zeitalter Jesu. Reimer, Berlin 1905.
- Synagoge und Kirche in ihren Anfängen. Reimer, Berlin 1908.
