= Slovak-Moravian Carpathians =

Coordinates: 49°3′36″N 17°57′36″E

Slovak-Moravian Carpathians, marked in red and labeled with C

The Slovak-Moravian Carpathians (CZ/SK: Slovensko-moravské Karpaty) are the mountain ranges along the border of the Czech Republic and Slovakia. Before the Treaty of Trianon in 1920, it was known in Hungarian as Magyar-morva határhegység 'the Hungarian-Moravian border mountains'.

Geologically these ranges are part of the Outer Western Carpathians group of the Western Carpathians, and are composed mainly of flysch sediment.

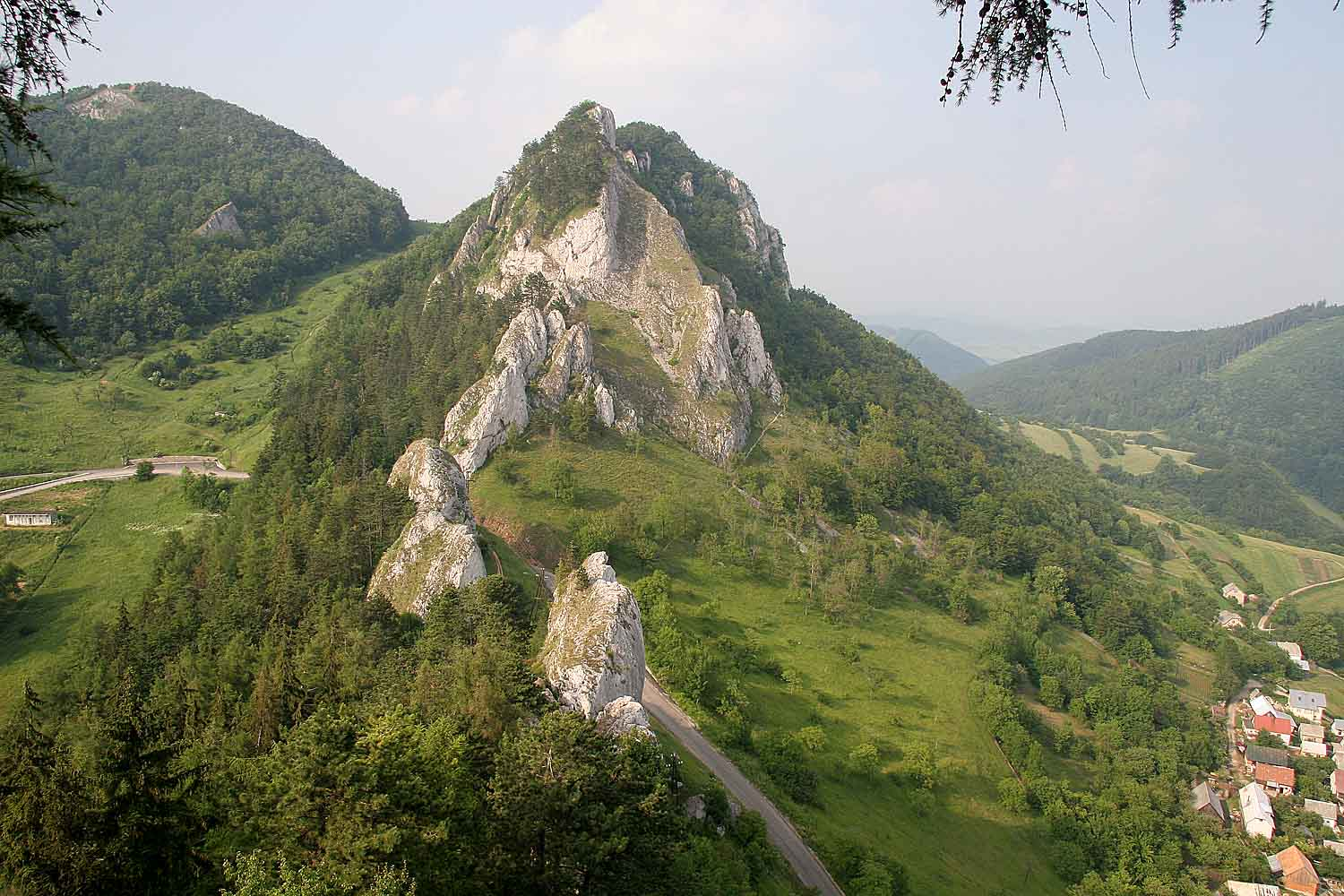
Vršatec klippe of the White Carpathians, near Vršatské Podhradie

The Slovak-Moravian Carpathians consist of:

- White Carpathians (CZ: Bílé Karpaty, SK: Biele Karpaty), which encompasses the Biele Karpaty Protected Landscape Area within Slovakia and the Bílé Karpaty Protected Landscape Area in the Czech Republic
- Javorníky (CZ+SK; "Maple Mountains"), including the two highest points in these ranges, Veľký Javorník at 3,514 feet (1,071 metres) and Malý Javorník (1,021 metres)
- Myjava Hills (SK: Myjavská pahorkatina), rugged highlands along the Myjava River
- Váh Valley Land (SK: Považské podolie) along the Váh River
- Vizovice Highlands (CZ: Vizovická vrchovina), rugged highlands within the Zlín Region, including the highest peak, Klášťov
