= Vanišovec =

Nature reserve in Šaštín-Stráže, Slovakia

Coordinates: 48.6147°N 17.1464°E

- IUCN category Ia (strict nature reserve)
- Interactive map of Vanišovec
- Area: 1.96 km^{2} (0.76 sq mi)
- Established: 2012
- Governing body: ŠOP - S-CHKO Záhorie

Vanišovec is a nature reserve in the Slovak municipality of Šaštín-Stráže. It covers an area of 196 ha and has a protection level of 4 and 5.
