= Osuský =

Osuský is a surname. It may refer to:

- Peter Osuský, a Slovak politician and candidate to the 2014 Slovak presidential election
- Štefan Osuský (1889–1973), Austro-Hungarian born Slovak lawyer, diplomat, politician and university professor

== See also ==
- Osuské, a village and municipality in Senica District in the Trnava Region of western Slovakia
