= Myjava (river) =

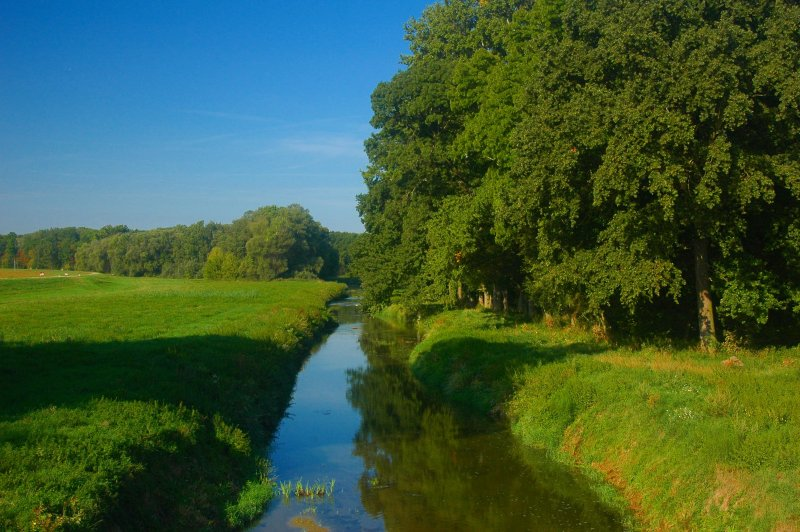
- The Myjava near estuary

Location
- Countries: Slovakia; Czech Republic
- Regions (SK)/ Regions (CZ): Trnava; Trenčín; South Moravian

Physical characteristics
- Source
  - location: Nová Lhota, White Carpathians
  - elevation: 669 m (2,195 ft)
- Mouth
  - location: Morava
  - coordinates: 48°37′44″N 16°57′30″E
  - elevation: 152 m (499 ft)
- Length: 79 km (49 mi)
- Basin size: 745 km^{2} (288 sq mi)
- Discharge
  - average: 2.64 m^{3}/s (93 cu ft/s) in Štefanov

Basin features
- Progression: Morava→ Danube→ Black Sea

The Myjava is a river in Slovakia and briefly in the Czech Republic, a left tributary of the Morava River. It is 79 km (49 mi) long. Its drainage basin has an area of 745 km^{2} (288 sq mi).

It rises in the White Carpathians near the village of Nová Lhota in Moravia, but crosses the Czech–Slovak border shortly afterwards and flows in a southern direction until the town of Myjava, where it enters the Myjava Hills and turns west. Near Sobotište it flows into the Záhorie Lowland and turns south until the village of Jablonica, turning northwest and from Senica it flows west, passing through Šaštín-Stráže and finally flowing into the Morava River near Kúty.

== Etymology ==
The stem myj- comes from Proto-Slavic *myjǫ (Slovak: mytie, podmývanie), meaning "to wash", "to undermine river banks".
