= Rovensko =

Rovensko may refer to:

== Czech Republic ==
- Rovensko pod Troskami, a town in the Liberec Region
- Rovensko (Šumperk District), a municipality and village in the Olomouc Region

== Slovakia ==
- Rovensko, Senica District, a municipality and village in the Trnava Region

== Romania ==
- Rovensko, the Czech name for Ravensca village in Șopotu Nou commune, Romania
