= Hradište pod Vrátnom =

- Municipality
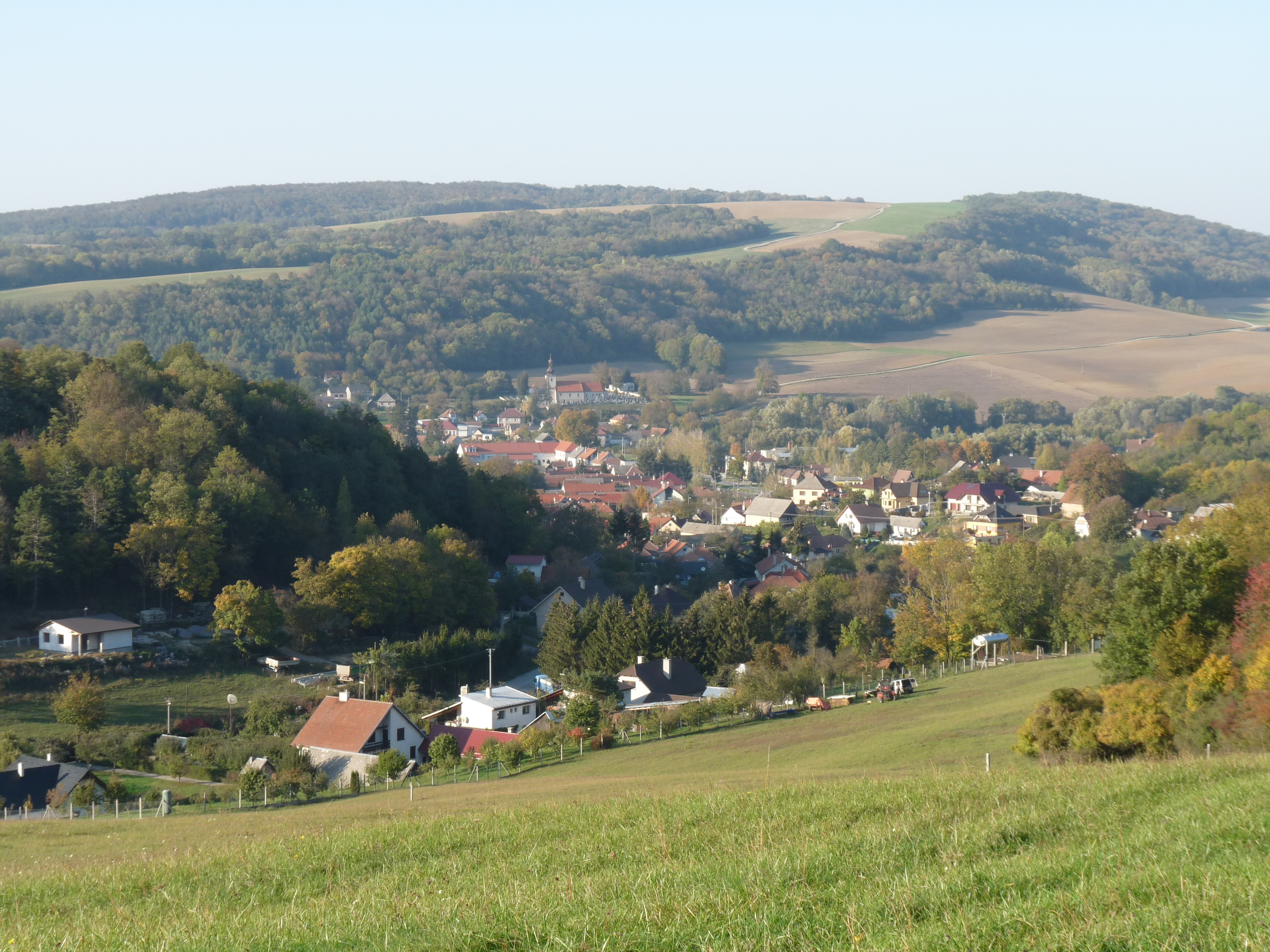

- Flag

- Location of Hradište pod Vrátnom in the Trnava Region Location of Hradište pod Vrátnom in Slovakia
- Coordinates: 48.63°N 17.50°E
- Country: Slovakia
- Region: Trnava Region
- District: Senica District
- First mentioned: 1262

Area
  - Total: 25.19 km^{2} (9.73 sq mi)
- Elevation: 233 m (764 ft)

Population (2025)
  - Total: 674
- Time zone: UTC+1 (CET)
  - Summer (DST): UTC+2 (CEST)
- Postal code: 906 12
- Area code: +421 34
- Vehicle registration plate (until 2022): SE
- Website: www.hradistepodvratnom.sk

Hradište pod Vrátnom (Hungarian: Harádics) is a village and municipality in Senica District in the Trnava Region of western Slovakia.

== History ==
In historical records the village was first mentioned in 1262.

== Geography ==
The municipality lies at an altitude of 233 metres (764 ft) and covers an area of 25.19 km^{2} (9.73 sq mi) (2025).

== Population ==
Population statistic (10 years)
Year	1995	2005	2015	2025
Count	682	703	665	674
Difference		+3.07%	−5.40%	+1.35%

Population statistic
Year	2024	2025
Count	665	674
Difference		+1.35%

It has a population of 674 people (31 December 2025).

=== Ethnicity ===
Census 2021 (1+ %)
Ethnicity	Number	Fraction
Slovak	635	94.49%
Romani	30	4.46%
Not found out	25	3.72%
Czech	7	1.04%
Total	672	

In year 2021 was 672 people by ethnicity 635 as Slovak, 30 as Romani, 25 as Not found out, 7 as Czech, 5 as Hungarian, 2 as Austrian, 2 as Other and 1 as Ukrainian.

Note on population: The difference values of population numbers in the table "Population statistic" and in the sections "Ethnicity" & "Religion" is caused by the use of various statistical methods.

=== Religion ===
Census 2021 (1+ %)
Religion	Number	Fraction
Roman Catholic Church	474	70.54%
None	154	22.92%
Not found out	22	3.27%
Evangelical Church	13	1.93%
Total	672	

In year 2021 was 672 people by religion 474 from Roman Catholic Church, 154 from None, 22 from Not found out, 13 from Evangelical Church, 3 from Calvinist Church, 1 from Jehovah's Witnesses, 1 from Christian Congregations in Slovakia, 1 from Islam, 1 from Greek Catholic Church, 1 from Buddhism and 1 from Ad hoc movements.

== Genealogical resources ==
The records for genealogical research are available at the state archive "Statny Archiv in Bratislava, Slovakia"

- Roman Catholic church records (births/marriages/deaths): 1709-1958 (parish A)

== See also ==
- List of municipalities and towns in Slovakia
