= Koválov, Senica District =

Koválov
- Municipality
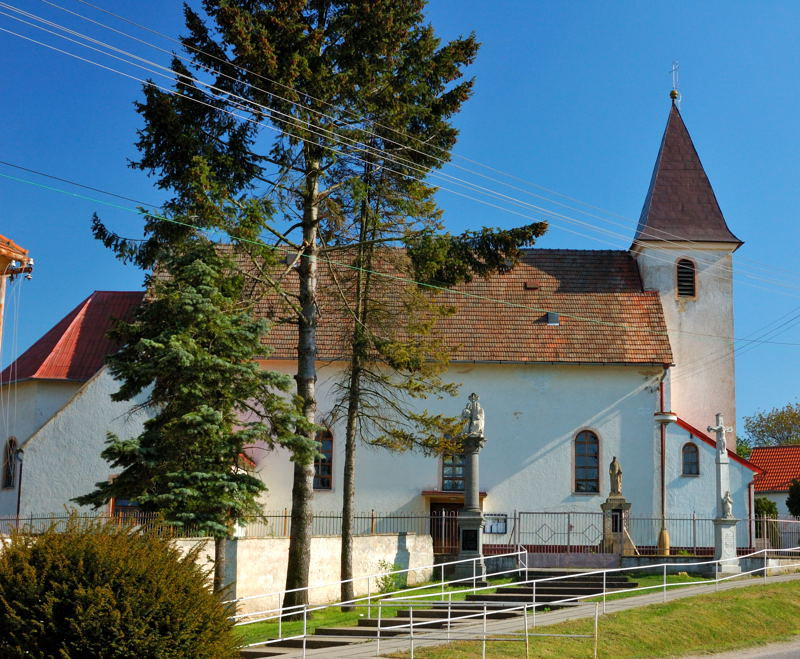

- Flag

- Location of Koválov in the Trnava Region Location of Koválov in Slovakia
- Coordinates: 48°42′N 17°17′E
- Country: Slovakia
- Region: Trnava Region
- District: Senica District
- First mentioned: 1392

Area
  - Total: 13.62 km^{2} (5.26 sq mi)
- Elevation: 210 m (690 ft)

Population (2025)
  - Total: 678
- Time zone: UTC+1 (CET)
  - Summer (DST): UTC+2 (CEST)
- Postal code: 906 03
- Area code: +421 34
- Vehicle registration plate (until 2022): SE
- Website: www.kovalov.sk

Koválov (Hungarian: Nagykovalló) is a village and municipality in Senica District in the Trnava Region of western Slovakia.

== History ==
In historical records the village was first mentioned in 1392.

== Geography ==
The municipality lies at an altitude of 210 metres (690 ft) and covers an area of 13.62 km^{2} (5.26 sq mi) (2025).

== Population ==
Population statistic (10 years)
Year	1995	2005	2015	2025
Count	645	659	707	678
Difference		+2.17%	+7.28%	−4.10%

Population statistic
Year	2024	2025
Count	677	678
Difference		+0.14%

It has a population of 678 people (31 December 2025).

=== Ethnicity ===
Census 2021 (1+ %)
Ethnicity	Number	Fraction
Slovak	682	98.41%
Not found out	8	1.15%
Czech	7	1.01%
Total	693	

In year 2021 was 693 people by ethnicity 682 as Slovak, 8 as Not found out, 7 as Czech, 3 as Romanian, 1 as Russian, 1 as German and 1 as Bulgarian.

Note on population: The difference values of population numbers in the table "Population statistic" and in the sections "Ethnicity" & "Religion" is caused by the use of various statistical methods.

=== Religion ===
Census 2021 (1+ %)
Religion	Number	Fraction
Roman Catholic Church	536	77.34%
None	127	18.33%
Not found out	9	1.3%
Evangelical Church	7	1.01%
Total	693	

In year 2021 was 693 people by religion 536 from Roman Catholic Church, 127 from None, 9 from Not found out, 7 from Evangelical Church, 6 from Ad hoc movements, 5 from Other, 1 from Calvinist Church, 1 from Greek Catholic Church and 1 from United Methodist Church.

== Genealogical resources ==
The records for genealogical research are available at the state archive "Statny Archiv in Bratislava, Slovakia"

- Roman Catholic church records (births/marriages/deaths): 1668-1897 (parish A)

== See also ==
- List of municipalities and towns in Slovakia
