= Moravský Svätý Ján =

- Municipality
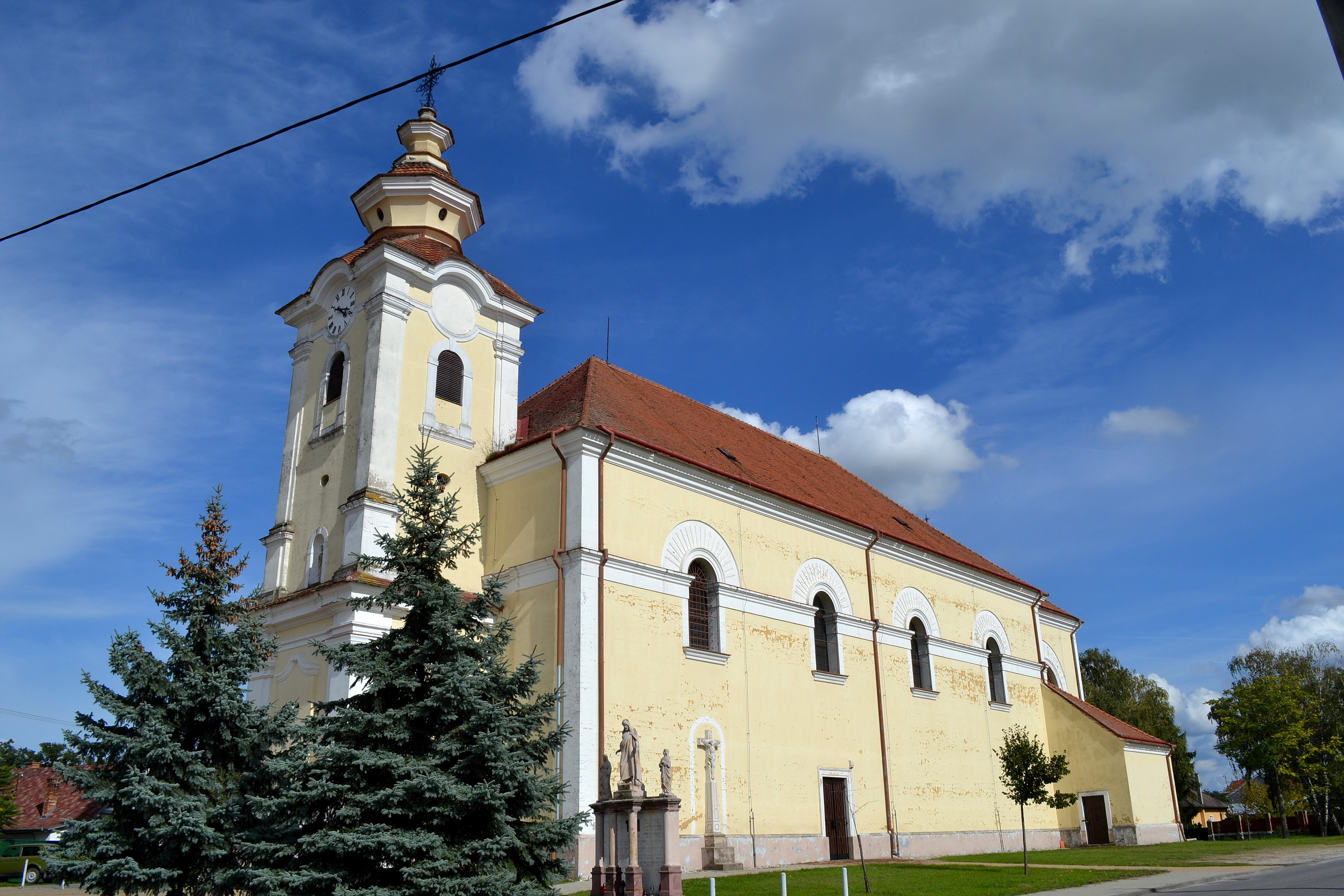

- Flag

- Location of Moravský Svätý Ján in the Trnava Region Location of Moravský Svätý Ján in Slovakia
- Coordinates: 48.58°N 17.02°E
- Country: Slovakia
- Region: Trnava Region
- District: Senica District
- First mentioned: 1449

Area
  - Total: 39.21 km^{2} (15.14 sq mi)
- Elevation: 152 m (499 ft)

Population (2025)
  - Total: 2,136
- Time zone: UTC+1 (CET)
  - Summer (DST): UTC+2 (CEST)
- Postal code: 908 71
- Area code: +421 34
- Vehicle registration plate (until 2022): SE
- Website: www.moravskysvatyjan.sk

Moravský Svätý Ján (Hungarian: Morvaszentjános) is a village and municipality in Senica District in the Trnava Region of western Slovakia.

== History ==
In historical records the village was first mentioned in 1449. Under the names SZ.JANOS then ST.JOHANN IN UNGARN in the Austrian Empire. The villages name was until 1918 Morvaszentjános.

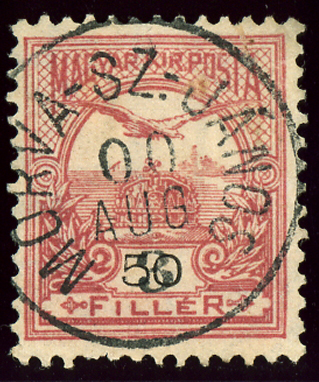
Hungarian stamp cancelled in the village in 1900

== Geography ==
The municipality lies at an altitude of 152 metres (499 ft) and covers an area of 39.21 km^{2} (15.14 sq mi) (2025).

== Population ==
Population statistic (10 years)
Year	1995	2005	2015	2025
Count	2008	2076	2099	2136
Difference		+3.38%	+1.10%	+1.76%

Population statistic
Year	2024	2025
Count	2126	2136
Difference		+0.47%

It has a population of 2136 people (31 December 2025).

=== Ethnicity ===
Census 2021 (1+ %)
Ethnicity	Number	Fraction
Slovak	2056	95.62%
Not found out	78	3.62%
Czech	23	1.06%
Total	2150	

In year 2021 was 2150 people by ethnicity 2056 as Slovak, 78 as Not found out, 23 as Czech, 4 as German, 4 as Moravian, 4 as Hungarian, 4 as Other, 2 as Romanian, 2 as Polish, 2 as Greek, 1 as Romani, 1 as Rusyn, 1 as Russian and 1 as Austrian.

Note on population: The difference values of population numbers in the table "Population statistic" and in the sections "Ethnicity" & "Religion" is caused by the use of various statistical methods.

=== Religion ===
Census 2021 (1+ %)
Religion	Number	Fraction
Roman Catholic Church	1501	69.81%
None	508	23.63%
Not found out	77	3.58%
Evangelical Church	24	1.12%
Total	2150	

In year 2021 was 2150 people by religion 1501 from Roman Catholic Church, 508 from None, 77 from Not found out, 24 from Evangelical Church, 8 from Christian Congregations in Slovakia, 7 from Greek Catholic Church, 6 from Other and not ascertained christian church, 6 from Ad hoc movements, 5 from Other, 4 from Calvinist Church, 1 from Old Catholic Church, 1 from Eastern Orthodox Church, 1 from Paganism and natural spirituality and 1 from Islam.
