= Plavecký Peter =

- Municipality
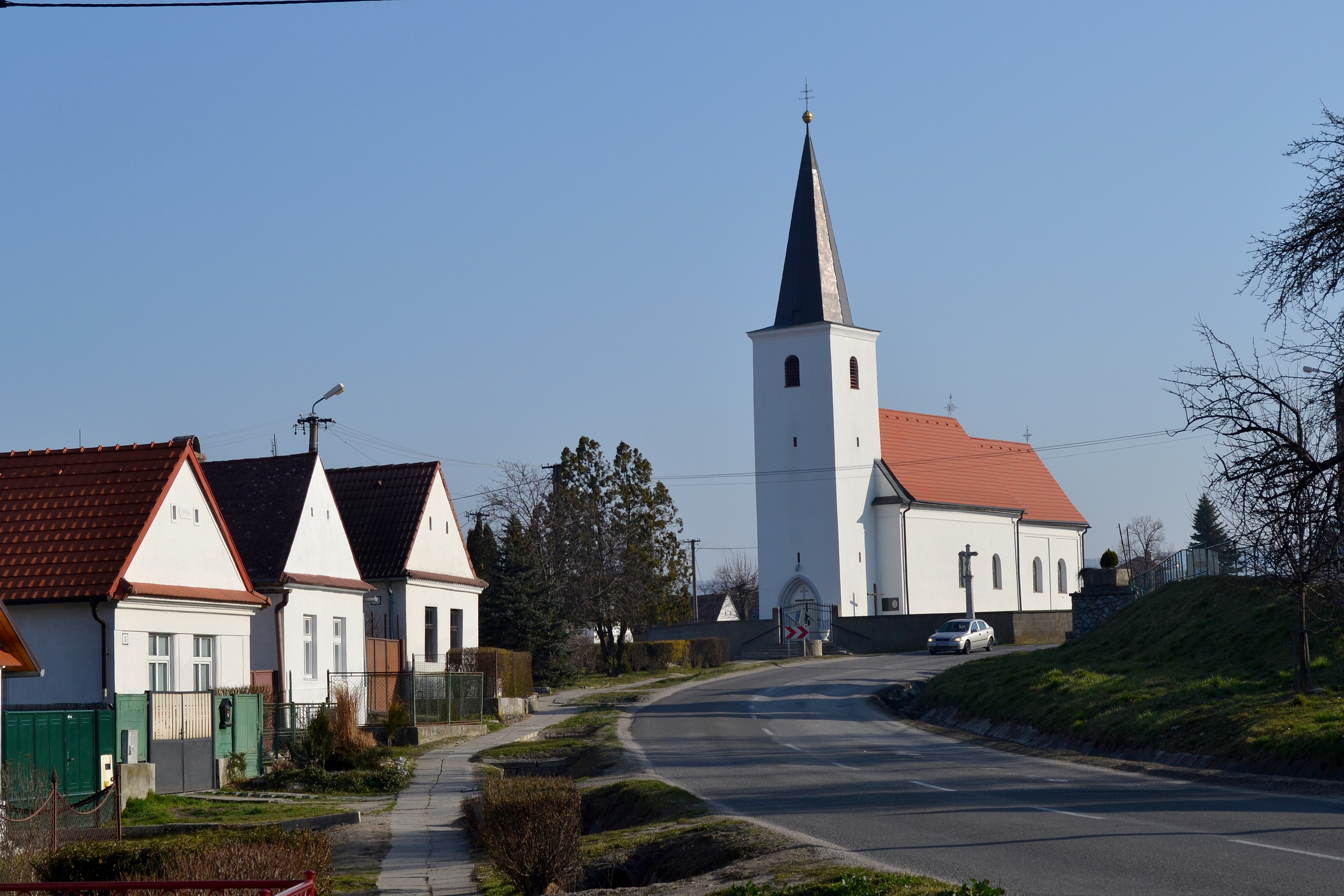

- Flag

- Location of Plavecký Peter in the Trnava Region Location of Plavecký Peter in Slovakia
- Coordinates: 48.54°N 17.33°E
- Country: Slovakia
- Region: Trnava Region
- District: Senica District
- First mentioned: 1394

Area
  - Total: 14.78 km^{2} (5.71 sq mi)
- Elevation: 222 m (728 ft)

Population (2025)
  - Total: 599
- Time zone: UTC+1 (CET)
  - Summer (DST): UTC+2 (CEST)
- Postal code: 906 35
- Area code: +421 34
- Vehicle registration plate (until 2022): SE
- Website: www.plaveckypeter.sk

Plavecký Peter (Hungarian: Detrekőszentpéter) is a village and municipality in Senica District in the Trnava Region of western Slovakia.

== History ==
In historical records the village was first mentioned in 1394.

== Geography ==
The municipality lies at an altitude of 222 metres (728 ft) and covers an area of 14.78 km^{2} (5.71 sq mi) (2025).

== Population ==
Population statistic (10 years)
Year	1995	2005	2015	2025
Count	614	630	626	599
Difference		+2.60%	−0.63%	−4.31%

Population statistic
Year	2024	2025
Count	607	599
Difference		−1.31%

It has a population of 599 people (31 December 2025).

=== Ethnicity ===
Census 2021 (1+ %)
Ethnicity	Number	Fraction
Slovak	580	95.39%
Not found out	22	3.61%
Total	608	

In year 2021 was 608 people by ethnicity 580 as Slovak, 22 as Not found out, 6 as Other, 3 as Czech, 1 as Romani, 1 as Austrian and 1 as German.

Note on population: The difference values of population numbers in the table "Population statistic" and in the sections "Ethnicity" & "Religion" is caused by the use of various statistical methods.

=== Religion ===
Census 2021 (1+ %)
Religion	Number	Fraction
Roman Catholic Church	459	75.49%
None	104	17.11%
Not found out	22	3.62%
Christian Congregations in Slovakia	9	1.48%
Evangelical Church	9	1.48%
Total	608	

In year 2021 was 608 people by religion 459 from Roman Catholic Church, 104 from None, 22 from Not found out, 9 from Christian Congregations in Slovakia, 9 from Evangelical Church, 2 from United Methodist Church, 1 from Greek Catholic Church, 1 from Church of Jesus Christ of Latter-day Saints and 1 from Ad hoc movements.
