= Smrdáky =

- Municipality
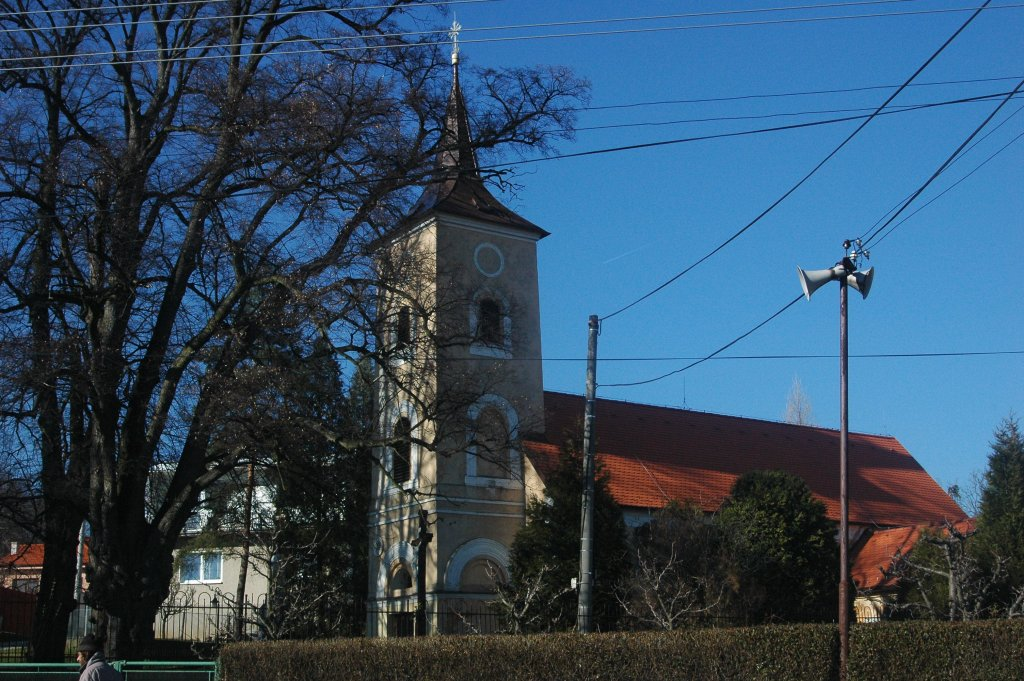

- Flag

- Location of Smrdáky in the Trnava Region Location of Smrdáky in Slovakia
- Coordinates: 48.72°N 17.30°E
- Country: Slovakia
- Region: Trnava Region
- District: Senica District
- First mentioned: 1436

Area
  - Total: 4.72 km^{2} (1.82 sq mi)
- Elevation: 237 m (778 ft)

Population (2025)
  - Total: 558
- Time zone: UTC+1 (CET)
  - Summer (DST): UTC+2 (CEST)
- Postal code: 906 03
- Area code: +421 34
- Vehicle registration plate (until 2022): SE
- Website: www.obec-smrdaky.sk

Smrdáky (Hungarian: Büdöskő) is a spa village and municipality in Senica District in the Trnava Region of western Slovakia.

== History ==
In historical records the village was first mentioned in 1436.

== Geography ==
The municipality lies at an altitude of 237 metres (778 ft) and covers an area of 4.72 km^{2} (1.82 sq mi) (2025).

== Population ==
Population statistic (10 years)
Year	1995	2005	2015	2025
Count	645	610	686	558
Difference		−5.42%	+12.45%	−18.65%

Population statistic
Year	2024	2025
Count	559	558
Difference		−0.17%

It has a population of 558 people (31 December 2025).

=== Ethnicity ===
Census 2021 (1+ %)
Ethnicity	Number	Fraction
Slovak	579	99.14%
Czech	6	1.02%
Total	584	

In year 2021 was 584 people by ethnicity 579 as Slovak, 6 as Czech, 5 as Not found out, 1 as Romani and 1 as Hungarian.

Note on population: The difference values of population numbers in the table "Population statistic" and in the sections "Ethnicity" & "Religion" is caused by the use of various statistical methods.

=== Religion ===
Census 2021 (1+ %)
Religion	Number	Fraction
Roman Catholic Church	434	74.32%
None	131	22.43%
Evangelical Church	10	1.71%
Total	584	

In year 2021 was 584 people by religion 434 from Roman Catholic Church, 131 from None, 10 from Evangelical Church, 3 from Not found out, 3 from Other, 1 from United Methodist Church, 1 from Seventh-day Adventist Church and 1 from Ad hoc movements.
