= Šajdíkove Humence =

- Municipality
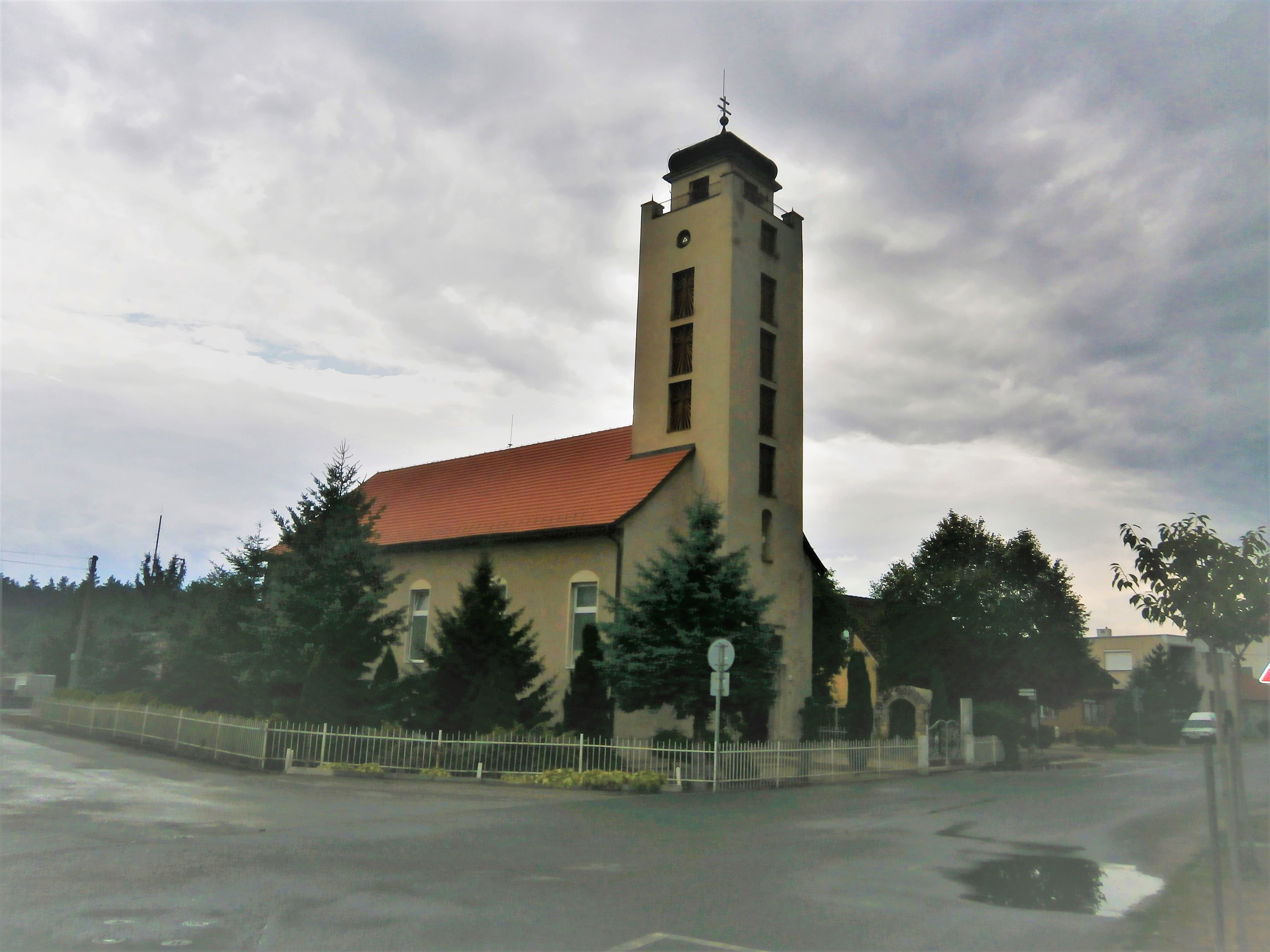

- Flag

- Location of Šajdíkove Humence in the Trnava Region Location of Šajdíkove Humence in Slovakia
- Coordinates: 48.65°N 17.27°E
- Country: Slovakia
- Region: Trnava Region
- District: Senica District
- First mentioned: 1926

Area
  - Total: 15.52 km^{2} (5.99 sq mi)
- Elevation: 192 m (630 ft)

Population (2025)
  - Total: 1,077
- Time zone: UTC+1 (CET)
  - Summer (DST): UTC+2 (CEST)
- Postal code: 906 07
- Area code: +421 34
- Vehicle registration plate (until 2022): SE
- Website: sajdikovehumence.sk

Šajdíkové Humence (Hungarian: Sajdikhumenec) is a village and municipality in Senica District in the Trnava Region of western Slovakia.

== History ==
In historical records the village was first mentioned in 1926.

== Geography ==
The municipality lies at an altitude of 192 metres (630 ft) and covers an area of 15.52 km^{2} (5.99 sq mi) (2025).

== Population ==
Population statistic (10 years)
Year	1995	2005	2015	2025
Count	1035	1108	1137	1077
Difference		+7.05%	+2.61%	−5.27%

Population statistic
Year	2024	2025
Count	1089	1077
Difference		−1.10%

It has a population of 1077 people (31 December 2025).

=== Ethnicity ===
Census 2021 (1+ %)
Ethnicity	Number	Fraction
Slovak	1033	94.85%
Not found out	42	3.85%
Czech	13	1.19%
Total	1089	

In year 2021 was 1089 people by ethnicity 1033 as Slovak, 42 as Not found out, 13 as Czech, 5 as Romani, 3 as Other, 2 as Rusyn, 2 as Croatian, 2 as English and 1 as Hungarian.

Note on population: The difference values of population numbers in the table "Population statistic" and in the sections "Ethnicity" & "Religion" is caused by the use of various statistical methods.

=== Religion ===
Census 2021 (1+ %)
Religion	Number	Fraction
Roman Catholic Church	774	71.07%
None	206	18.92%
Not found out	52	4.78%
Evangelical Church	34	3.12%
Total	1089	

In year 2021 was 1089 people by religion 774 from Roman Catholic Church, 206 from None, 52 from Not found out, 34 from Evangelical Church, 7 from Greek Catholic Church, 5 from Ad hoc movements, 3 from Other, 2 from Other and not ascertained christian church, 1 from Eastern Orthodox Church, 1 from Jehovah's Witnesses, 1 from Christian Congregations in Slovakia, 1 from Islam, 1 from Church of Jesus Christ of Latter-day Saints and 1 from Buddhism.
