= Kuklov =

- Municipality
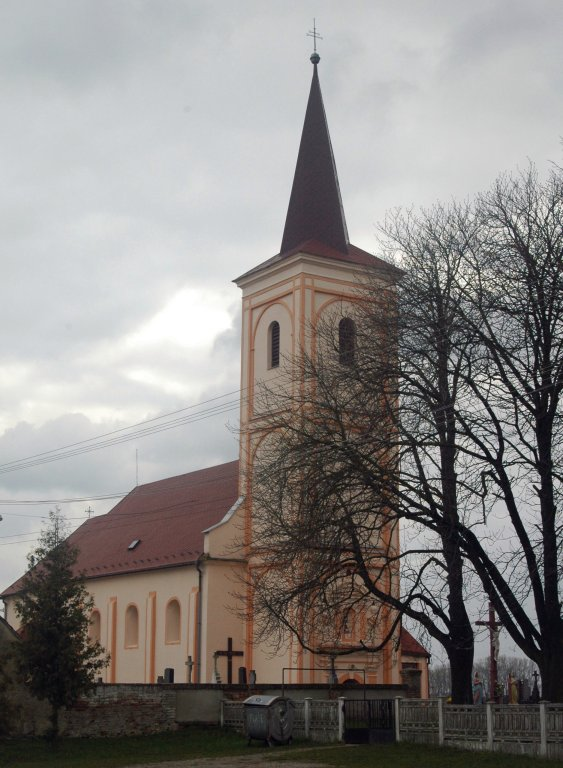

- Location of Kuklov in the Trnava Region Location of Kuklov in Slovakia
- Coordinates: 48.63°N 17.08°E
- Country: Slovakia
- Region: Trnava Region
- District: Senica District
- First mentioned: 1394

Area
  - Total: 18.70 km^{2} (7.22 sq mi)
- Elevation: 160 m (520 ft)

Population (2025)
  - Total: 751
- Time zone: UTC+1 (CET)
  - Summer (DST): UTC+2 (CEST)
- Postal code: 908 78
- Area code: +421 34
- Vehicle registration plate (until 2022): SE
- Website: www.obeckuklov.sk

Kuklov (Hungarian: Kukló) is a village and municipality in Senica District in the Trnava Region of western Slovakia.

== History ==
In historical records the village was first mentioned in 1394.

== Geography ==
The municipality lies at an altitude of 160 metres (520 ft) and covers an area of 18.70 km^{2} (7.22 sq mi) (2025).

== Population ==
Population statistic (10 years)
Year	1995	2005	2015	2025
Count	734	808	795	751
Difference		+10.08%	−1.60%	−5.53%

Population statistic
Year	2024	2025
Count	753	751
Difference		−0.26%

It has a population of 751 people (31 December 2025).

=== Ethnicity ===
Census 2021 (1+ %)
Ethnicity	Number	Fraction
Slovak	770	97.59%
Not found out	13	1.64%
Total	789	

In year 2021 was 789 people by ethnicity 770 as Slovak, 13 as Not found out, 6 as Romani, 5 as Czech, 2 as Moravian, 2 as Hungarian, 1 as Ukrainian, 1 as Italian, 1 as Rusyn and 1 as Austrian.

Note on population: The difference values of population numbers in the table "Population statistic" and in the sections "Ethnicity" & "Religion" is caused by the use of various statistical methods.

=== Religion ===
Census 2021 (1+ %)
Religion	Number	Fraction
Roman Catholic Church	656	83.14%
None	82	10.39%
Not found out	22	2.79%
Greek Catholic Church	10	1.27%
Total	789	

In year 2021 was 789 people by religion 656 from Roman Catholic Church, 82 from None, 22 from Not found out, 10 from Greek Catholic Church, 7 from Calvinist Church, 4 from Christian Congregations in Slovakia, 4 from Evangelical Church, 1 from Other, 1 from Czechoslovak Hussite Church, 1 from Apostolic Church and 1 from Ad hoc movements.

== Notable people ==
- Andrej Žarnov, poet
