= Prietrž =

- Municipality
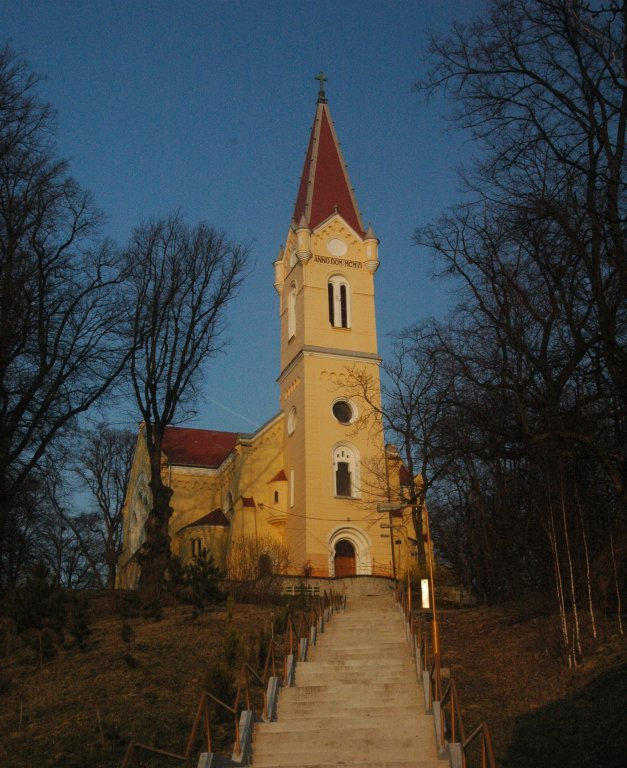

- Flag

- Location of Prietrž in the Trnava Region Location of Prietrž in Slovakia
- Coordinates: 48.58°N 17.23°E
- Country: Slovakia
- Region: Trnava Region
- District: Senica District
- First mentioned: 1262

Area
  - Total: 24.68 km^{2} (9.53 sq mi)
- Elevation: 293 m (961 ft)

Population (2025)
  - Total: 734
- Time zone: UTC+1 (CET)
  - Summer (DST): UTC+2 (CEST)
- Postal code: 906 11
- Area code: +421 34
- Vehicle registration plate (until 2022): SE
- Website: www.prietrz.sk

Prietrž (Hungarian: Nagypetrős) is a village and municipality in Senica District in the Trnava Region of western Slovakia.

== History ==
In historical records the village was first mentioned in 1262.

== Geography ==
The municipality lies at an altitude of 293 metres (961 ft) and covers an area of 24.68 km^{2} (9.53 sq mi) (2025).

== Population ==
Population statistic (10 years)
Year	1995	2005	2015	2025
Count	793	713	728	734
Difference		−10.08%	+2.10%	+0.82%

Population statistic
Year	2024	2025
Count	727	734
Difference		+0.96%

It has a population of 734 people (31 December 2025).

=== Ethnicity ===
Census 2021 (1+ %)
Ethnicity	Number	Fraction
Slovak	701	93.09%
Not found out	39	5.17%
Czech	9	1.19%
Total	753	

In year 2021 was 753 people by ethnicity 701 as Slovak, 39 as Not found out, 9 as Czech, 6 as German, 6 as Other, 3 as Rusyn, 3 as Russian, 1 as Turkish, 1 as Serbian, 1 as Moravian and 1 as Hungarian.

Note on population: The difference values of population numbers in the table "Population statistic" and in the sections "Ethnicity" & "Religion" is caused by the use of various statistical methods.

=== Religion ===
Census 2021 (1+ %)
Religion	Number	Fraction
Evangelical Church	419	55.64%
None	165	21.91%
Roman Catholic Church	100	13.28%
Not found out	38	5.05%
United Methodist Church	15	1.99%
Total	753	

In year 2021 was 753 people by religion 419 from Evangelical Church, 165 from None, 100 from Roman Catholic Church, 38 from Not found out, 15 from United Methodist Church, 5 from Other, 5 from Greek Catholic Church, 2 from Christian Congregations in Slovakia, 1 from Eastern Orthodox Church, 1 from Paganism and natural spirituality, 1 from Islam and 1 from Buddhism.
