= Myjava Hills =

Coordinates: 48.7122°N 17.5342°E

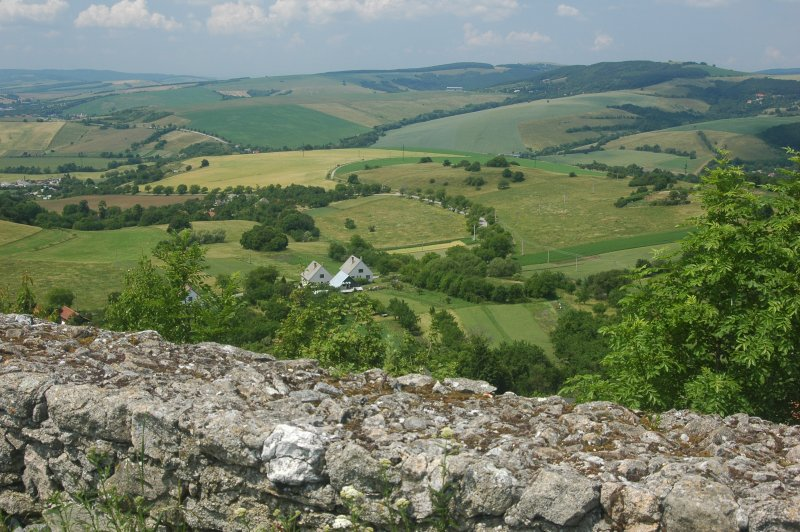
The village of Podbranč among the Myjava Hills

The Myjava Hills (Slovak: Myjavská pahorkatina) is an area of hills in western Slovakia, rugged highlands along the Myjava River composed of Carpathian flysch. Geologically it is one range of the Slovak-Moravian Carpathians of the Outer Western Carpathians.

The highest peak is Bradlo (543 meters above sea level), site of a monument to General Milan Rastislav Štefánik designed by Slovak architect Dušan Jurkovič. Three towns stand within the borders of the Myjava Hills: Myjava, Stará Turá, and Brezová pod Bradlom.
