= Andrej Žarnov =

- Born: November 19, 1905; Kuklov (Kukló), Austria-Hungary (today:Slovakia)
- Died: February 16, 1982 (aged 76); Poughkeepsie, New York, U.S.
- Education: Comenius University
- Occupations: Physician; Poet; Translator
- Writing career
- Language: Slovak
- Genre: Poetry

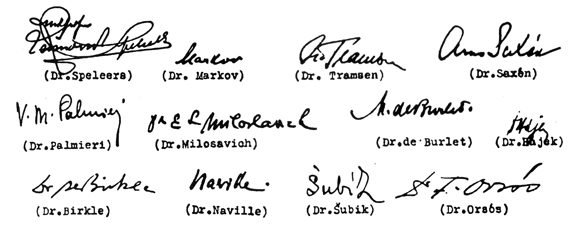
Signatures of the members of the Katyn Commission

Andrej Žarnov, born František Šubík, (November 19, 1903 in Kuklov (Kukló), Austria-Hungary (today:Slovakia) – March 16, 1982 in Poughkeepsie City, New York, United States) was a Slovak Catholic modernist (Catholic Moderna) writer and physician.

As a physician, he was a member of international board, which was researching crimes committed by Soviet authorities in Katyn (1943). After 1945 he was persecuted and imprisoned. Since 1952 on emigration; he moved to Austria, Italy and USA.

== Notable works ==
He was an author of socio-political, patriotic and reflective poems – Stráž pri Morave (1925), Štít (1940), Preosievač piesku (1978). He was a populariser and translator of Polish poetry works, author of anthology U pol'ských básnikov (1936).
