= Smolinské =

- Municipality
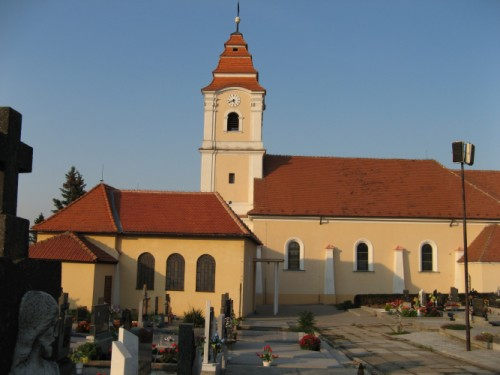

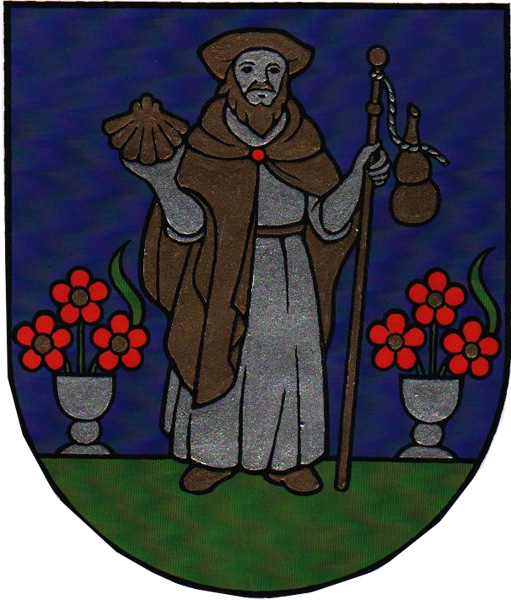
- Flag Coat of arms

- Location of Smolinské in the Trnava Region Location of Smolinské in Slovakia
- Coordinates: 48.68°N 17.13°E
- Country: Slovakia
- Region: Trnava Region
- District: Senica District
- First mentioned: 1392

Area
  - Total: 15.69 km^{2} (6.06 sq mi)
- Elevation: 190 m (620 ft)

Population (2025)
  - Total: 931
- Time zone: UTC+1 (CET)
  - Summer (DST): UTC+2 (CEST)
- Postal code: 908 42
- Area code: +421 34
- Vehicle registration plate (until 2022): SE
- Website: smolinske.sk

Smolinské (Hungarian: Szomolánka) is a village and municipality in Senica District in the Trnava Region of western Slovakia.

== History ==
In historical records the village was first mentioned in 1392.

== Geography ==
The municipality lies at an altitude of 190 metres (620 ft) and covers an area of 15.69 km^{2} (6.06 sq mi) (2025).

== Population ==
Population statistic (10 years)
Year	1995	2005	2015	2025
Count	962	965	924	931
Difference		+0.31%	−4.24%	+0.75%

Population statistic
Year	2024	2025
Count	920	931
Difference		+1.19%

It has a population of 931 people (31 December 2025).

=== Ethnicity ===
Census 2021 (1+ %)
Ethnicity	Number	Fraction
Slovak	890	98.56%
Total	903	

In year 2021 was 903 people by ethnicity 890 as Slovak, 8 as Not found out, 3 as Hungarian, 2 as Czech, 2 as German, 1 as Rusyn, 1 as Moravian, 1 as Croatian and 1 as Albanian.

Note on population: The difference values of population numbers in the table "Population statistic" and in the sections "Ethnicity" & "Religion" is caused by the use of various statistical methods.

=== Religion ===
Census 2021 (1+ %)
Religion	Number	Fraction
Roman Catholic Church	741	82.06%
None	119	13.18%
Not found out	22	2.44%
Evangelical Church	9	1%
Total	903	

In year 2021 was 903 people by religion 741 from Roman Catholic Church, 119 from None, 22 from Not found out, 9 from Evangelical Church, 5 from Greek Catholic Church, 1 from Eastern Orthodox Church, 1 from Other and not ascertained christian church, 1 from Christian Congregations in Slovakia, 1 from Islam, 1 from Other, 1 from Church of the Brethren and 1 from Ad hoc movements.
