= Rybky =

- Municipality
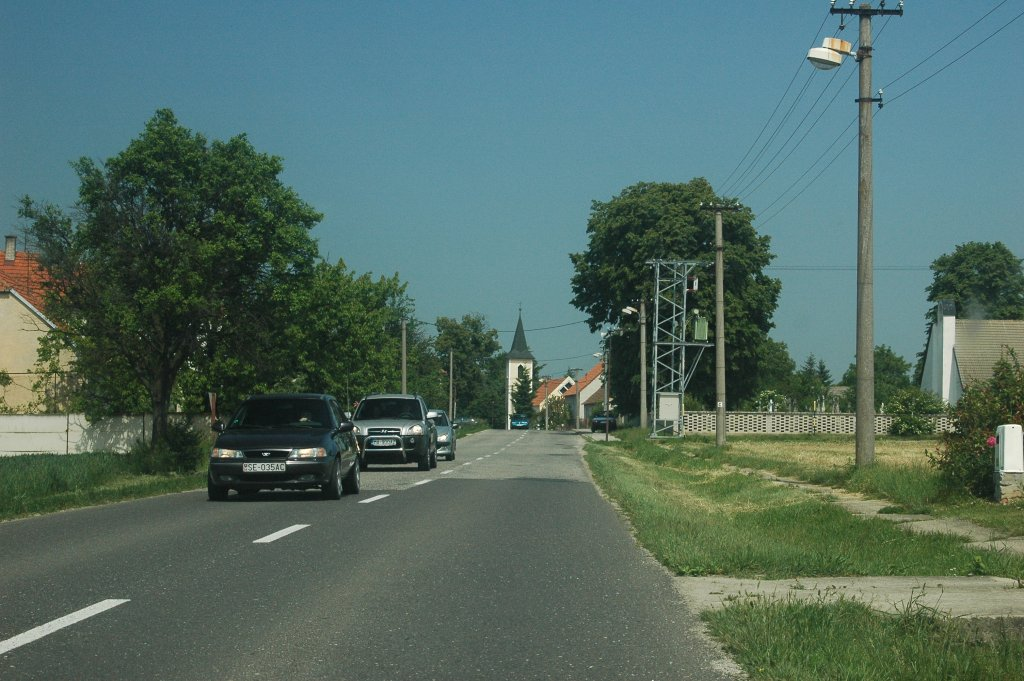

- Flag

- Location of Rybky in the Trnava Region Location of Rybky in Slovakia
- Coordinates: 48.72°N 17.33°E
- Country: Slovakia
- Region: Trnava Region
- District: Senica District
- First mentioned: 1394

Area
  - Total: 5.77 km^{2} (2.23 sq mi)
- Elevation: 213 m (699 ft)

Population (2025)
  - Total: 412
- Time zone: UTC+1 (CET)
  - Summer (DST): UTC+2 (CEST)
- Postal code: 906 04
- Area code: +421 34
- Vehicle registration plate (until 2022): SE
- Website: www.obecrybky.sk

Rybky (Hungarian: Halasd) is a village and municipality in Senica District in the Trnava Region of western Slovakia.

== History ==
In historical records the village was first mentioned in 1394.

== Geography ==
The municipality lies at an altitude of 213 metres (699 ft) and covers an area of 5.77 km^{2} (2.23 sq mi) (2025).

== Population ==
Population statistic (10 years)
Year	1995	2005	2015	2025
Count	398	455	451	412
Difference		+14.32%	−0.87%	−8.64%

Population statistic
Year	2024	2025
Count	420	412
Difference		−1.90%

It has a population of 412 people (31 December 2025).

=== Ethnicity ===
Census 2021 (1+ %)
Ethnicity	Number	Fraction
Slovak	410	98.32%
Not found out	7	1.67%
Total	417	

In year 2021 was 417 people by ethnicity 410 as Slovak, 7 as Not found out, 3 as Serbian, 2 as Czech and 1 as Other.

Note on population: The difference values of population numbers in the table "Population statistic" and in the sections "Ethnicity" & "Religion" is caused by the use of various statistical methods.

=== Religion ===
Census 2021 (1+ %)
Religion	Number	Fraction
Roman Catholic Church	299	71.7%
None	71	17.03%
Evangelical Church	40	9.59%
Total	417	

In year 2021 was 417 people by religion 299 from Roman Catholic Church, 71 from None, 40 from Evangelical Church, 4 from Not found out, 1 from Paganism and natural spirituality, 1 from United Methodist Church and 1 from Ad hoc movements.
