= Čáry =

- Municipality
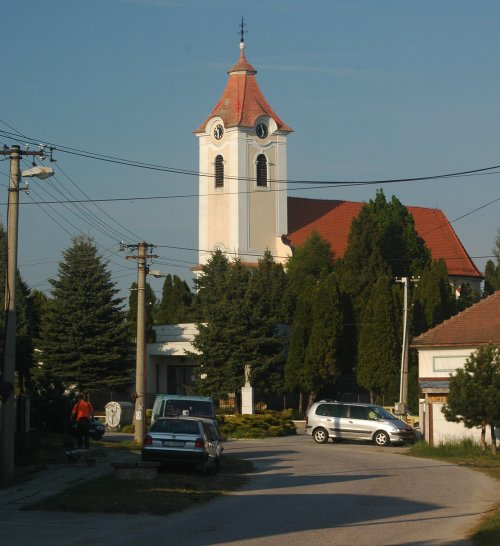

- Flag

- Location of Čáry in the Trnava Region Location of Čáry in Slovakia
- Coordinates: 48.65°N 17.10°E
- Country: Slovakia
- Region: Trnava Region
- District: Senica District
- First mentioned: 1588

Area
  - Total: 14.94 km^{2} (5.77 sq mi)
- Elevation: 167 m (548 ft)

Population (2025)
  - Total: 1,277
- Time zone: UTC+1 (CET)
  - Summer (DST): UTC+2 (CEST)
- Postal code: 908 43
- Area code: +421 34
- Vehicle registration plate (until 2022): SE
- Website: cary.sk

Čáry (Hungarian: Csári) is a village in Senica District in the Trnava Region of western Slovakia.

== History ==
In historical records the village was first mentioned in 1392.

== Geography ==
The municipality lies at an altitude of 167 metres (548 ft) and covers an area of 14.94 km^{2} (5.77 sq mi) (2025).

== Population ==
Population statistic (10 years)
Year	1995	2005	2015	2025
Count	1169	1253	1284	1277
Difference		+7.18%	+2.47%	−0.54%

Population statistic
Year	2024	2025
Count	1279	1277
Difference		−0.15%

It has a population of 1277 people (31 December 2025).

=== Ethnicity ===
Census 2021 (1+ %)
Ethnicity	Number	Fraction
Slovak	1219	96.05%
Not found out	37	2.91%
Romani	20	1.57%
Czech	15	1.18%
Total	1269	

In year 2021 was 1269 people by ethnicity 1219 as Slovak, 37 as Not found out, 20 as Romani, 15 as Czech, 4 as Hungarian, 2 as Polish, 1 as Ukrainian, 1 as Serbian, 1 as Russian, 1 as Moravian, 1 as Other and 1 as Croatian.

Note on population: The difference values of population numbers in the table "Population statistic" and in the sections "Ethnicity" & "Religion" is caused by the use of various statistical methods.

=== Religion ===
Census 2021 (1+ %)
Religion	Number	Fraction
Roman Catholic Church	997	78.57%
None	201	15.84%
Not found out	31	2.44%
Total	1269	

In year 2021 was 1269 people by religion 997 from Roman Catholic Church, 201 from None, 31 from Not found out, 10 from Evangelical Church, 9 from Christian Congregations in Slovakia, 7 from Greek Catholic Church, 5 from Calvinist Church, 3 from Eastern Orthodox Church, 3 from Ad hoc movements, 1 from Other, 1 from Church of the Brethren and 1 from Baptists Church.

== Genealogical resources ==
The records for genealogical research are available at the state archive "Statny Archiv in Bratislava, Slovakia"

- Roman Catholic church records (births/marriages/deaths): 1783-1896 (parish A)
- Lutheran church records (births/marriages/deaths): 1786-1895 (parish B)

== See also ==
- List of municipalities and towns in Slovakia
