= Častkov =

- Municipality
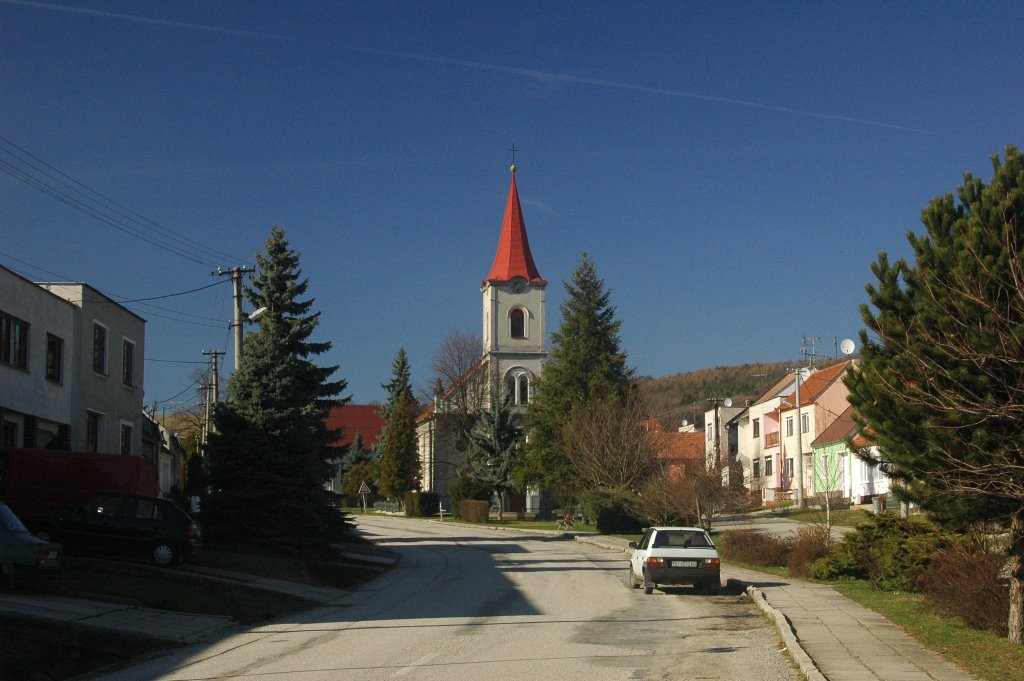

- Flag

- Location of Častkov in the Trnava Region Location of Častkov in Slovakia
- Coordinates: 48.75°N 17.35°E
- Country: Slovakia
- Region: Trnava Region
- District: Senica District
- First mentioned: 1394

Area
  - Total: 13.18 km^{2} (5.09 sq mi)
- Elevation: 382 m (1,253 ft)

Population (2025)
  - Total: 563
- Time zone: UTC+1 (CET)
  - Summer (DST): UTC+2 (CEST)
- Postal code: 906 04
- Area code: +421 34
- Vehicle registration plate (until 2022): SE
- Website: www.castkov.sk

Častkov (Hungarian: Császkó) is a village and municipality in Senica District in the Trnava Region of western Slovakia.

== History ==
In historical records the village was first mentioned in 1394.

== Geography ==
The municipality lies at an altitude of 382 metres (1,253 ft) and covers an area of 13.18 km^{2} (5.09 sq mi) (2025).

== Population ==
Population statistic (10 years)
Year	1995	2005	2015	2025
Count	593	608	583	563
Difference		+2.52%	−4.11%	−3.43%

Population statistic
Year	2024	2025
Count	550	563
Difference		+2.36%

It has a population of 563 people (31 December 2025).

=== Ethnicity ===
Census 2021 (1+ %)
Ethnicity	Number	Fraction
Slovak	555	98.57%
Not found out	10	1.77%
Total	563	

In year 2021 was 563 people by ethnicity 555 as Slovak, 10 as Not found out, 1 as Czech and 1 as Russian.

Note on population: The difference values of population numbers in the table "Population statistic" and in the sections "Ethnicity" & "Religion" is caused by the use of various statistical methods.

=== Religion ===
Census 2021 (1+ %)
Religion	Number	Fraction
Evangelical Church	362	64.3%
Roman Catholic Church	137	24.33%
None	51	9.06%
Not found out	11	1.95%
Total	563	

In year 2021 was 563 people by religion 362 from Evangelical Church, 137 from Roman Catholic Church, 51 from None, 11 from Not found out, 1 from Greek Catholic Church and 1 from Ad hoc movements.

== Genealogical resources ==
The records for genealogical research are available at the state archive "Statny Archiv in Bratislava, Slovakia"

- Roman Catholic church records (births/marriages/deaths): 1697-1910 (parish B)
- Lutheran church records (births/marriages/deaths): 1733-1902 (parish A)

== See also ==
- List of municipalities and towns in Slovakia
