= Sekule =

- Municipality
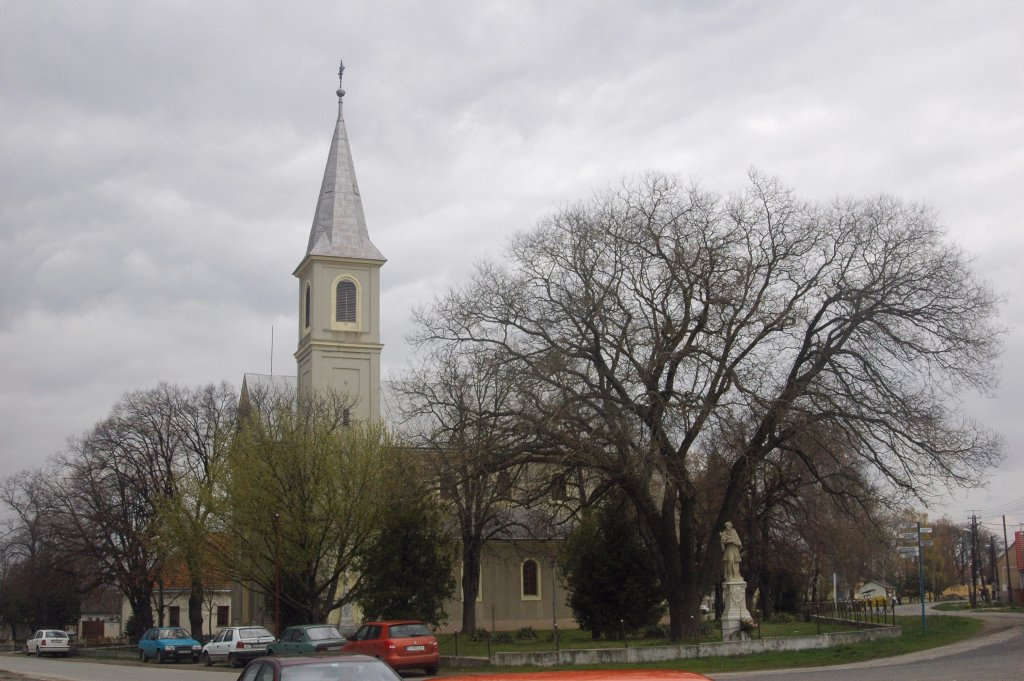

- Flag

- Location of Sekule in the Trnava Region Location of Sekule in Slovakia
- Coordinates: 48.60°N 17.00°E
- Country: Slovakia
- Region: Trnava Region
- District: Senica District
- First mentioned: 1402

Area
  - Total: 23.24 km^{2} (8.97 sq mi)
- Elevation: 158 m (518 ft)

Population (2025)
  - Total: 1,745
- Time zone: UTC+1 (CET)
  - Summer (DST): UTC+2 (CEST)
- Postal code: 908 80
- Area code: +421 34
- Vehicle registration plate (until 2022): SE
- Website: obecsekule.sk

Sekule (Hungarian: Székelyfalva) is a village and municipality in Senica District in the Trnava Region of western Slovakia.

== Etymology ==
The name is derived from the ethnonym Székelys (Slovak: Sikuli), one of the tribes who guarded the frontier area.

== History ==
In historical records the village was first mentioned in 1402.

== Geography ==
The municipality lies at an altitude of 158 metres (518 ft) and covers an area of 23.24 km^{2} (8.97 sq mi) (2025).

== Population ==
Population statistic (10 years)
Year	1995	2005	2015	2025
Count	1562	1635	1754	1745
Difference		+4.67%	+7.27%	−0.51%

Population statistic
Year	2024	2025
Count	1724	1745
Difference		+1.21%

It has a population of 1745 people (31 December 2025).

=== Ethnicity ===
Census 2021 (1+ %)
Ethnicity	Number	Fraction
Slovak	1674	95.38%
Not found out	74	4.21%
Czech	18	1.02%
Total	1755	

In year 2021 was 1755 people by ethnicity 1674 as Slovak, 74 as Not found out, 18 as Czech, 6 as Russian, 5 as Rusyn, 4 as Serbian, 3 as Romani, 3 as Hungarian, 1 as Italian, 1 as German and 1 as Other.

Note on population: The difference values of population numbers in the table "Population statistic" and in the sections "Ethnicity" & "Religion" is caused by the use of various statistical methods.

=== Religion ===
Census 2021 (1+ %)
Religion	Number	Fraction
Roman Catholic Church	1252	71.34%
None	349	19.89%
Not found out	104	5.93%
Total	1755	

In year 2021 was 1755 people by religion 1252 from Roman Catholic Church, 349 from None, 104 from Not found out, 11 from Greek Catholic Church, 11 from Evangelical Church, 11 from Ad hoc movements, 5 from Other, 4 from Christian Congregations in Slovakia, 3 from Other and not ascertained christian church, 2 from Calvinist Church, 2 from Eastern Orthodox Church and 1 from Buddhism.
