= Lakšárska Nová Ves =

- Municipality
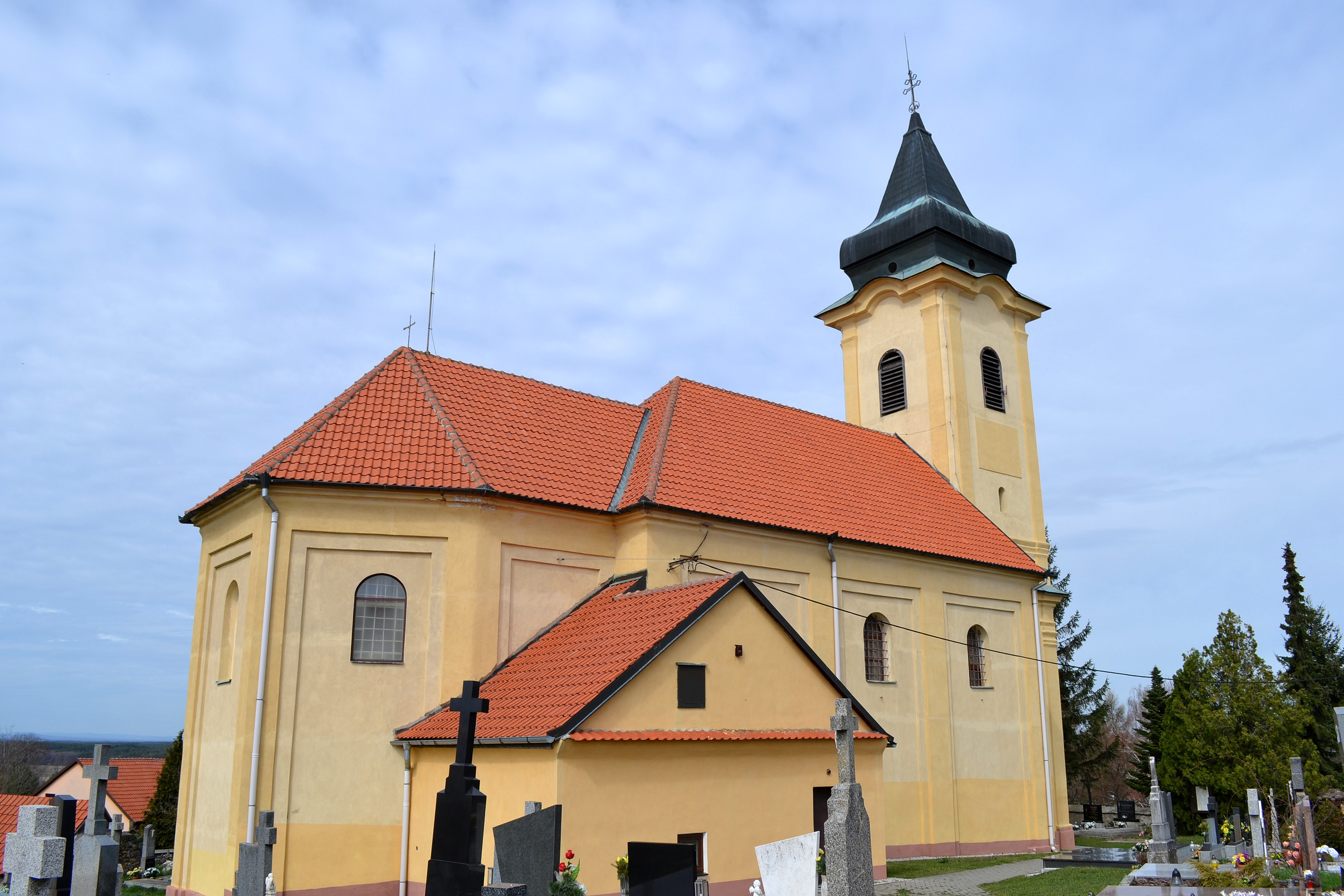

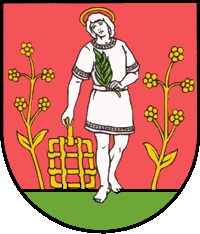
- Flag Coat of arms

- Location of Lakšárska Nová Ves in the Trnava Region Location of Lakšárska Nová Ves in Slovakia
- Coordinates: 48.58°N 17.18°E
- Country: Slovakia
- Region: Trnava Region
- District: Senica District
- First mentioned: 1296

Area
  - Total: 36.93 km^{2} (14.26 sq mi)
- Elevation: 233 m (764 ft)

Population (2025)
  - Total: 1,090
- Time zone: UTC+1 (CET)
  - Summer (DST): UTC+2 (CEST)
- Postal code: 908 76
- Area code: +421 34
- Vehicle registration plate (until 2022): SE
- Website: www.laksarskanovaves.sk

Lakšárska Nová Ves (Hungarian: Laksárújfalu) is a village and municipality in Senica District in the Trnava Region of western Slovakia.

== History ==
In historical records the village was first mentioned in 1296.

== Geography ==
The municipality lies at an altitude of 233 metres (764 ft) and covers an area of 36.93 km^{2} (14.26 sq mi) (2025).

== Population ==
Population statistic (10 years)
Year	1995	2005	2015	2025
Count	999	1059	1075	1090
Difference		+6.00%	+1.51%	+1.39%

Population statistic
Year	2024	2025
Count	1099	1090
Difference		−0.81%

It has a population of 1090 people (31 December 2025).

=== Ethnicity ===
Census 2021 (1+ %)
Ethnicity	Number	Fraction
Slovak	1084	95.92%
Not found out	34	3%
Czech	13	1.15%
Total	1130	

In year 2021 was 1130 people by ethnicity 1084 as Slovak, 34 as Not found out, 13 as Czech, 9 as Romani, 5 as Ukrainian, 3 as Other, 1 as Russian, 1 as Polish and 1 as Hungarian.

Note on population: The difference values of population numbers in the table "Population statistic" and in the sections "Ethnicity" & "Religion" is caused by the use of various statistical methods.

=== Religion ===
Census 2021 (1+ %)
Religion	Number	Fraction
Roman Catholic Church	829	73.36%
None	209	18.5%
Not found out	39	3.45%
Evangelical Church	14	1.24%
Total	1130	

In year 2021 was 1130 people by religion 829 from Roman Catholic Church, 209 from None, 39 from Not found out, 14 from Evangelical Church, 10 from Greek Catholic Church, 6 from Calvinist Church, 4 from Paganism and natural spirituality, 4 from Hinduism, 3 from Eastern Orthodox Church, 3 from Buddhism, 3 from Baptists Church, 2 from Old Catholic Church, 1 from Other and not ascertained christian church, 1 from Jehovah's Witnesses, 1 from Christian Congregations in Slovakia and 1 from Ad hoc movements.
