= Prievaly =

- Municipality
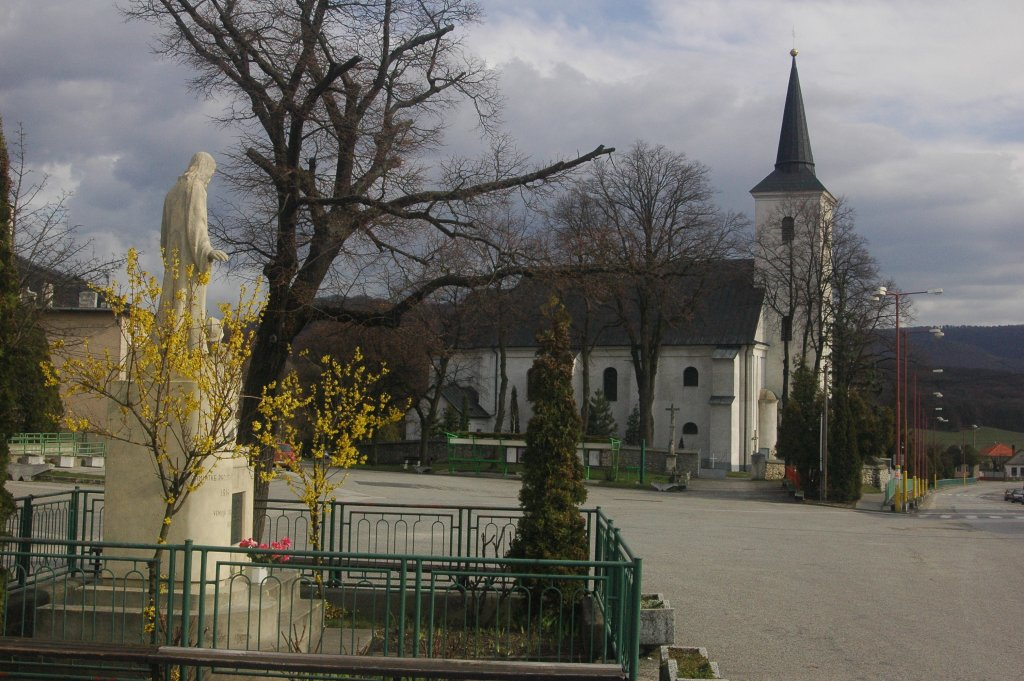

- Flag

- Location of Prievaly in the Trnava Region Location of Prievaly in Slovakia
- Coordinates: 48.57°N 17.35°E
- Country: Slovakia
- Region: Trnava Region
- District: Senica District
- First mentioned: 1439

Area
  - Total: 15.00 km^{2} (5.79 sq mi)
- Elevation: 245 m (804 ft)

Population (2025)
  - Total: 932
- Time zone: UTC+1 (CET)
  - Summer (DST): UTC+2 (CEST)
- Postal code: 906 34
- Area code: +421 34
- Vehicle registration plate (until 2022): SE
- Website: prievaly.sk

Prievaly (Hungarian: Sándorfa) is a village and municipality in the Senica District in the Trnava Region of western Slovakia.

== History ==
In historical records the village was first mentioned in 1439.

== Geography ==
The municipality lies at an altitude of 245 metres (804 ft) and covers an area of 15.00 km^{2} (5.79 sq mi) (2025).

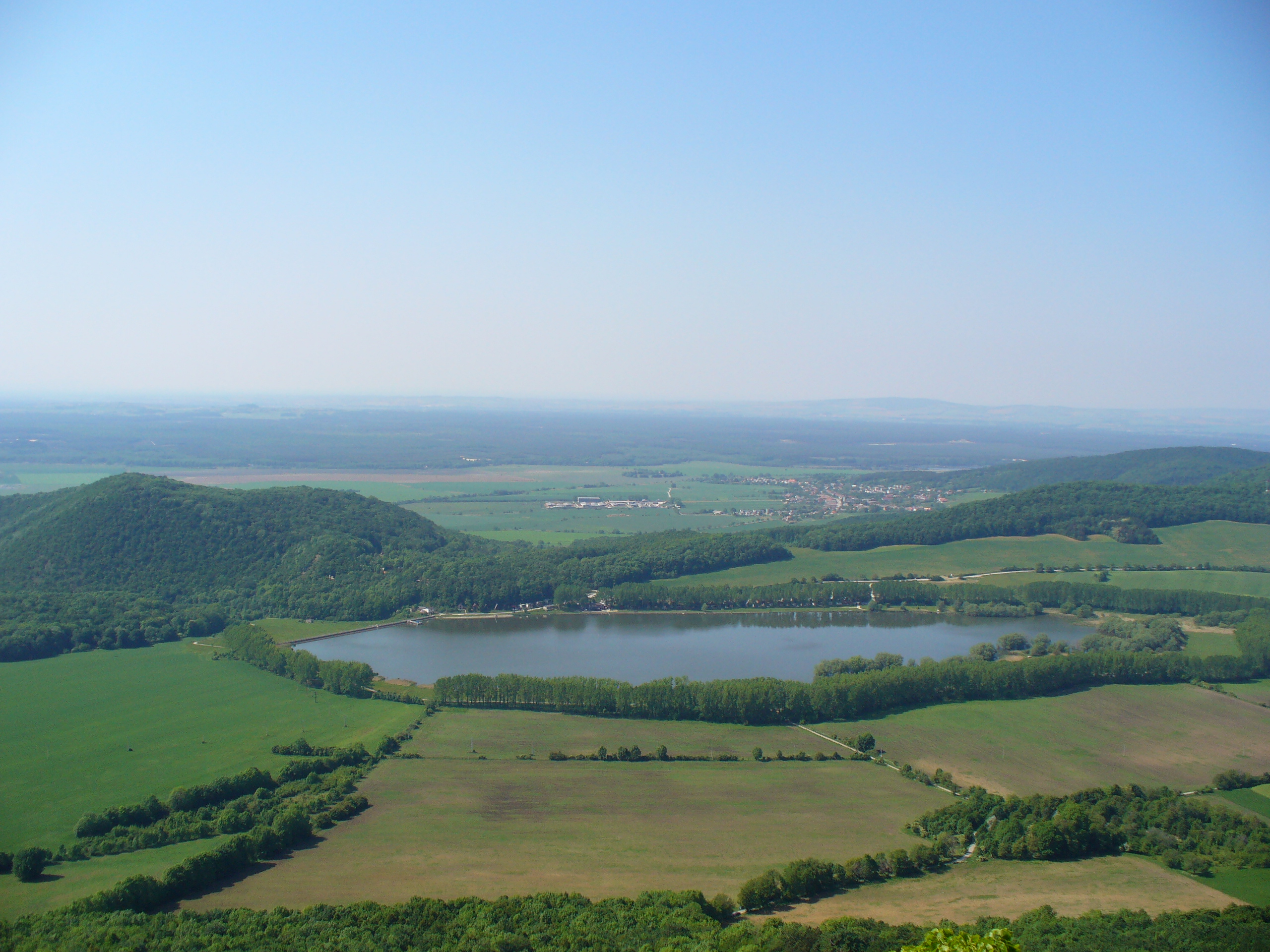
Prievaly as seen from Ostrý Kameň Castle with Buková reservoir in the foreground

== Population ==
Population statistic (10 years)
Year	1995	2005	2015	2025
Count	929	921	995	932
Difference		−0.86%	+8.03%	−6.33%

Population statistic
Year	2024	2025
Count	941	932
Difference		−0.95%

It has a population of 932 people (31 December 2025).

=== Ethnicity ===
Census 2021 (1+ %)
Ethnicity	Number	Fraction
Slovak	959	97.36%
Not found out	20	2.03%
Czech	12	1.21%
Total	985	

In year 2021 was 985 people by ethnicity 959 as Slovak, 20 as Not found out, 12 as Czech, 2 as Romanian, 1 as Hungarian, 1 as Other, 1 as English and 1 as Albanian.

Note on population: The difference values of population numbers in the table "Population statistic" and in the sections "Ethnicity" & "Religion" is caused by the use of various statistical methods.

=== Religion ===
Census 2021 (1+ %)
Religion	Number	Fraction
Roman Catholic Church	790	80.2%
None	143	14.52%
Not found out	21	2.13%
Total	985	

In year 2021 was 985 people by religion 790 from Roman Catholic Church, 143 from None, 21 from Not found out, 7 from Evangelical Church, 6 from Other, 6 from Greek Catholic Church, 4 from Ad hoc movements, 3 from Other and not ascertained christian church, 2 from Christian Congregations in Slovakia, 1 from Calvinist Church, 1 from Paganism and natural spirituality and 1 from Buddhism.
