= Jablonica =

- Municipality
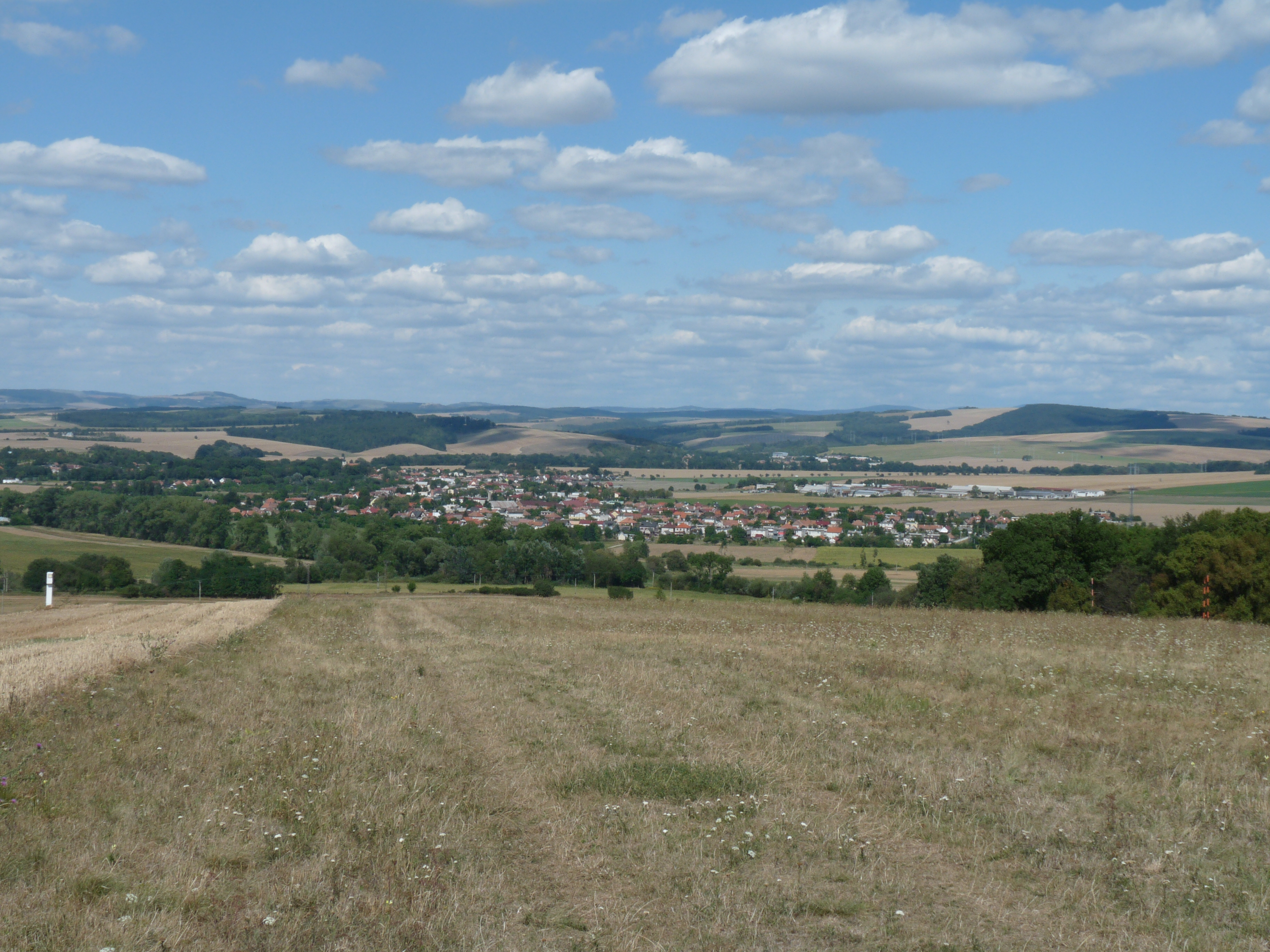

- Flag

- Location of Jablonica in the Trnava Region Location of Jablonica in Slovakia
- Coordinates: 48.61°N 17.42°E
- Country: Slovakia
- Region: Trnava Region
- District: Senica District
- First mentioned: 1262

Area
  - Total: 31.43 km^{2} (12.14 sq mi)
- Elevation: 209 m (686 ft)

Population (2025)
  - Total: 2,215
- Time zone: UTC+1 (CET)
  - Summer (DST): UTC+2 (CEST)
- Postal code: 906 32
- Area code: +421 34
- Vehicle registration plate (until 2022): SE
- Website: www.jablonica.sk

Jablonica is a village and municipality in Senica District in the Trnava Region of western Slovakia.

== History ==
In historical records the village was first mentioned in 1262.

== Geography ==
The municipality lies at an altitude of 209 metres (686 ft) and covers an area of 31.43 km^{2} (12.14 sq mi) (2025).

== Population ==
Population statistic (10 years)
Year	1995	2005	2015	2025
Count	2241	2301	2256	2215
Difference		+2.67%	−1.95%	−1.81%

Population statistic
Year	2024	2025
Count	2222	2215
Difference		−0.31%

It has a population of 2215 people (31 December 2025).

=== Ethnicity ===
Census 2021 (1+ %)
Ethnicity	Number	Fraction
Slovak	2213	98%
Not found out	39	1.72%
Total	2258	

In year 2021 was 2258 people by ethnicity 2213 as Slovak, 39 as Not found out, 16 as Czech, 4 as Ukrainian, 4 as Romani, 4 as Hungarian, 3 as Rusyn, 2 as Serbian, 2 as Moravian, 1 as Jewish, 1 as Vietnamese, 1 as Romanian, 1 as Polish and 1 as Albanian.

Note on population: The difference values of population numbers in the table "Population statistic" and in the sections "Ethnicity" & "Religion" is caused by the use of various statistical methods.

=== Religion ===
Census 2021 (1+ %)
Religion	Number	Fraction
Roman Catholic Church	1340	59.34%
None	699	30.96%
Evangelical Church	119	5.27%
Not found out	36	1.59%
Greek Catholic Church	26	1.15%
Total	2258	

In year 2021 was 2258 people by religion 1340 from Roman Catholic Church, 699 from None, 119 from Evangelical Church, 36 from Not found out, 26 from Greek Catholic Church, 13 from Eastern Orthodox Church, 6 from Other, 5 from Christian Congregations in Slovakia, 3 from Buddhism, 3 from Ad hoc movements, 2 from Paganism and natural spirituality, 1 from Other and not ascertained christian church, 1 from Islam, 1 from United Methodist Church, 1 from Church of Jesus Christ of Latter-day Saints, 1 from Baptists Church and 1 from Apostolic Church.

== Points of interest ==
The Jablonica castle is associated with the Apponyi family and specifically its so-called Jablonica line. An old castle was destroyed in an Ottoman raid in 1663 and subsequently rebuilt by the then-owners from the family. A branch of the Apponyis acquired it in 1772 and renovated it extensively in the late 19th century. The Apponyis lost its property in the aftermath of World War I, after which it changed hands several times during the Interwar period. It then served as a grain storage facility, a home for the occupying Wehrmacht, an elementary school, and a leather storehouse. In 2017 it was purchased by a non-profit group that intends to renovate it and convert into a hotel and cultural facility.

== Genealogical resources ==
The records for genealogical research are available at the state archive "Statny Archiv in Bratislava, Slovakia"

- Roman Catholic church records (births/marriages/deaths): 1692-1895 (parish A)
- Lutheran church records (births/marriages/deaths): 1733-1902 (parish B)

== See also ==
- List of municipalities and towns in Slovakia
