= Rovensko, Senica District =

Rovensko
- Municipality
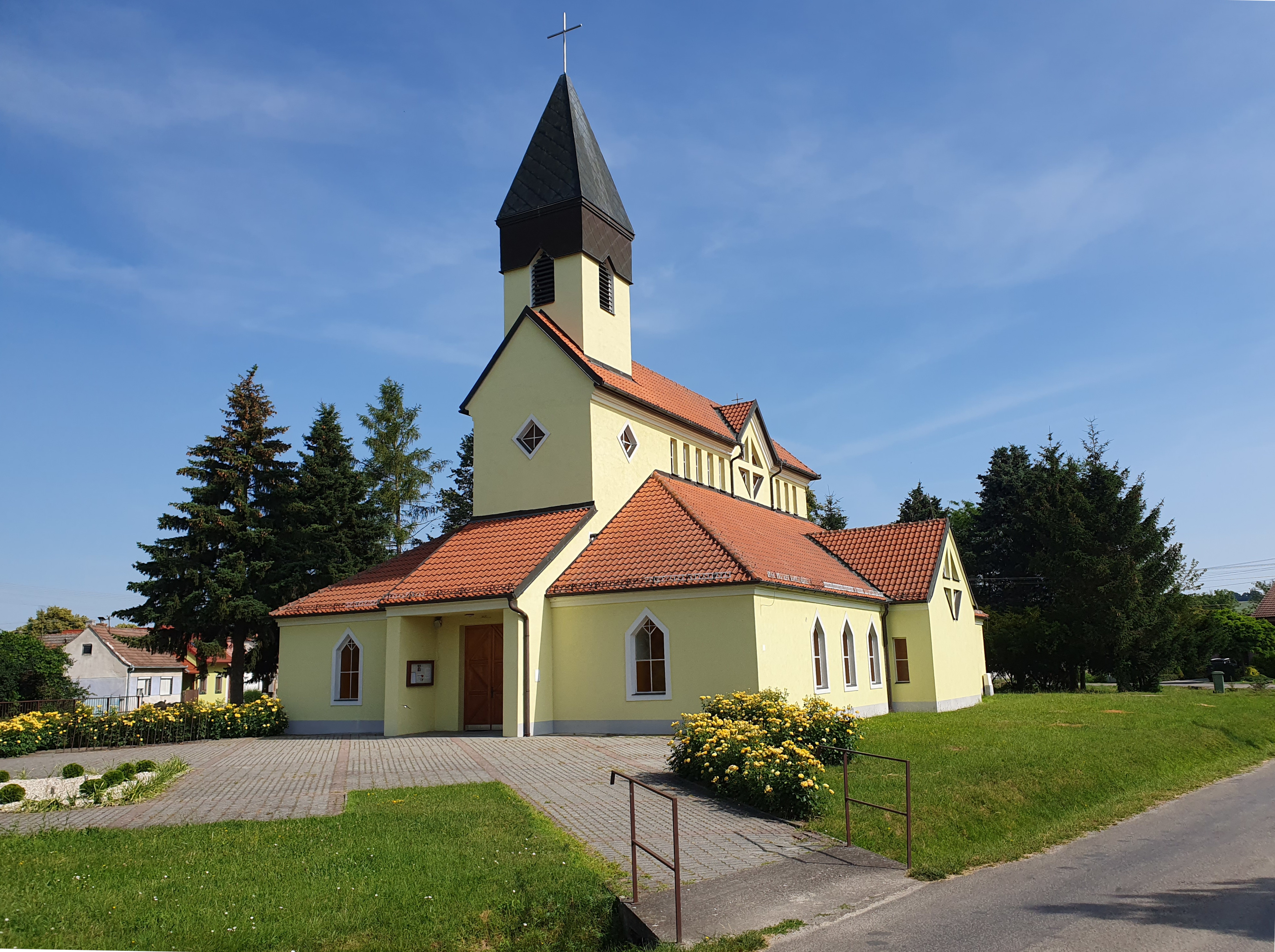
- Local church in Rovensko, Slovakia

- Flag Coat of arms

- Location of Rovensko in the Trnava Region Location of Rovensko in Slovakia
- Coordinates: 48°43′00″N 17°23′00″E
- Country: Slovakia
- Region: Trnava Region
- District: Senica District
- First mentioned: 1439

Area
  - Total: 10.40 km^{2} (4.02 sq mi)
- Elevation: 216 m (709 ft)

Population (2025)
  - Total: 434
- Time zone: UTC+1 (CET)
  - Summer (DST): UTC+2 (CEST)
- Postal code: 905 01
- Area code: +421 34
- Vehicle registration plate (until 2022): SE
- Website: www.rovensko.sk

Rovensko (Hungarian: Berencsróna, until 1899: Rovenszkó) is a village and municipality administered as part of Senica District in the Trnava Region of western Slovakia. The village is about 5 km NNE of the town of Senica and is close to the border with the Czech Republic.

== History ==
In historical records the village was first mentioned in 1439.

== Geography ==
The municipality lies at an altitude of 216 metres (709 ft) and covers an area of 10.40 km^{2} (4.02 sq mi) (2025).

== Population ==
Population statistic (10 years)
Year	1995	2005	2015	2025
Count	385	381	440	434
Difference		−1.03%	+15.48%	−1.36%

Population statistic
Year	2024	2025
Count	429	434
Difference		+1.16%

It has a population of 434 people (31 December 2025).

=== Ethnicity ===
Census 2021 (1+ %)
Ethnicity	Number	Fraction
Slovak	427	98.38%
Czech	10	2.3%
Not found out	10	2.3%
Total	434	

In year 2021 was 434 people by ethnicity 427 as Slovak, 10 as Czech, 10 as Not found out and 1 as Hungarian.

Note on population: The difference values of population numbers in the table "Population statistic" and in the sections "Ethnicity" & "Religion" is caused by the use of various statistical methods.

=== Religion ===
Census 2021 (1+ %)
Religion	Number	Fraction
Roman Catholic Church	227	52.3%
Evangelical Church	102	23.5%
None	87	20.05%
Not found out	7	1.61%
Other and not ascertained christian church	5	1.15%
Total	434	

In year 2021 was 434 people by religion 227 from Roman Catholic Church, 102 from Evangelical Church, 87 from None, 7 from Not found out, 5 from Other and not ascertained christian church, 2 from Jewish community, 2 from Other and 2 from United Methodist Church.
