= Senica District =

Coordinates: 48°40′35″N 17°21′50″E

- District
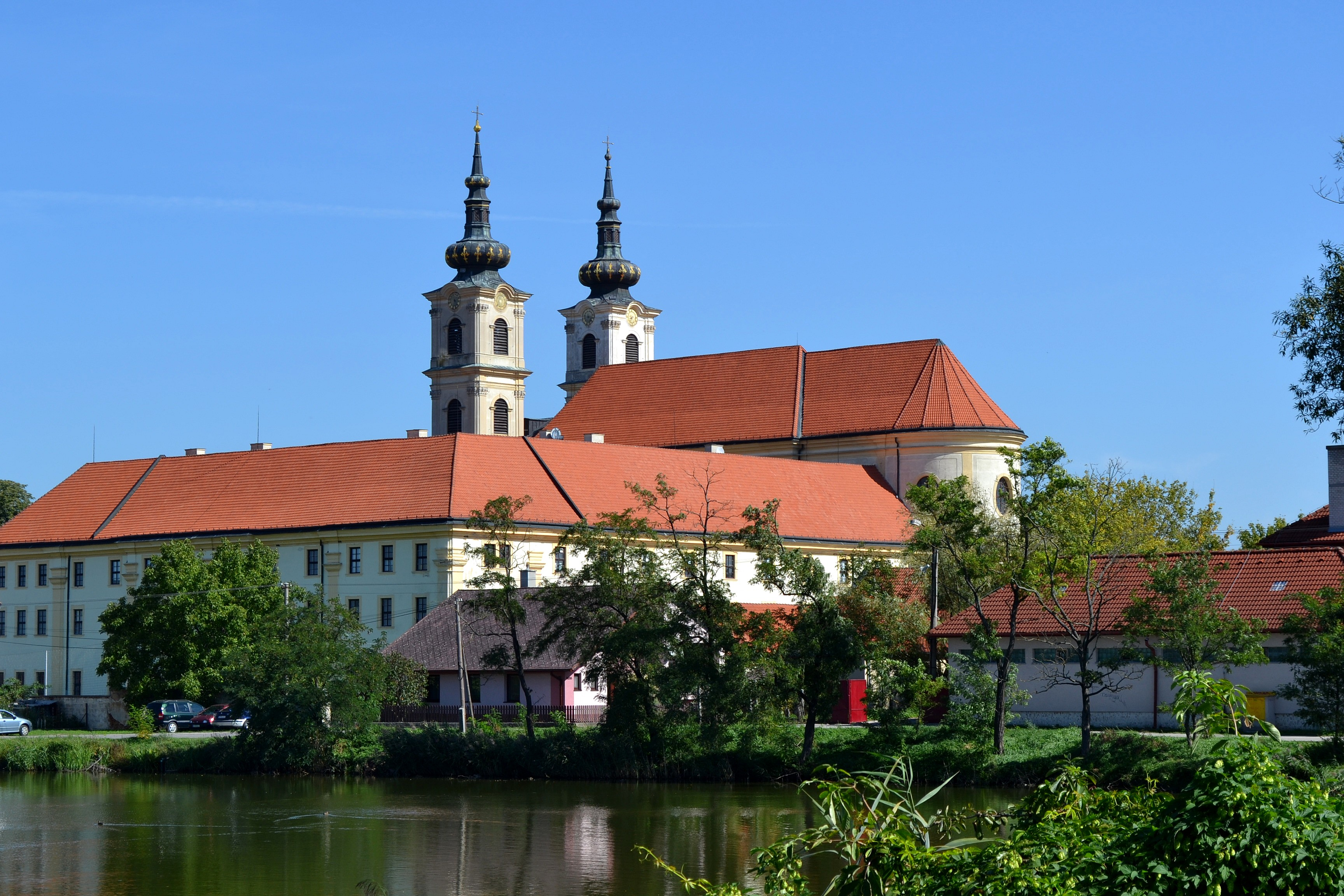
- Country: Slovakia
- Region (kraj): Trnava Region
- Seat: Senica

Area
  - Total: 683.26 km^{2} (263.81 sq mi)

Population (2025)
  - Total: 58,584
- Time zone: UTC+1 (CET)
  - Summer (DST): UTC+2 (CEST)
- Telephone prefix: 034
- Vehicle registration plate (until 2022): SE
- Municipalities: 31

Senica District (Slovak: okres Senica) is a district in the Trnava Region of western Slovakia. The district is relatively rich in natural resources oil, gas, lignite. It is an industrial district, in the late period had been established here new industrial facilities. Senica District in its present borders had been established in 1996. Administrative, cultural, and economic center is its seat and largest town Senica. In Senica District is located spa Smrdáky and of cultural importance is also basilica in Šaštín.

== Population ==
Population statistic (10 years)
Year	1995	2005	2015	2025
Count	60,502	60,793	60,653	58,584
Difference		+0.48%	−0.23%	−3.41%

Population statistic
Year	2024	2025
Count	58,776	58,584
Difference		−0.32%

It has a population of 58,584 people (31 December 2025).

Historical population
Year	Pop.	±%
1970	56,141	—
1980	59,056	+5.2%
1991	59,873	+1.4%
2001	60,891	+1.7%
2011	60,504	−0.6%
2021	59,749	−1.2%
Source: Statistical Office of the Slovak Republic

=== Ethnicity ===
Census 2021 (1+ %)
Ethnicity	Number	Fraction
Slovak	57,029	93.42%
Not found out	2150	3.52%
Czech	704	1.15%
Total	61,043	

In year 2021 was 61,043 people by ethnicity 57,029 as Slovak, 2150 as Not found out, 704 as Czech, 425 as Romani, 160 as Other, 98 as Hungarian, 54 as German, 52 as Rusyn, 50 as Russian, 44 as Romanian, 43 as Ukrainian, 33 as Polish, 32 as Moravian, 24 as Italian, 24 as Austrian, 23 as Vietnamese, 22 as Serbian, 18 as English, 11 as Albanian, 10 as Greek, 10 as Croatian, 8 as Jewish, 5 as Silesian, 4 as Irish, 4 as French, 3 as Bulgarian, 2 as Chinese and 1 as Turkish.

Note on population: The difference values of population numbers in the table "Population statistic" and in the sections "Ethnicity" & "Religion" is caused by the use of various statistical methods.

=== Religion ===
Census 2021 (1+ %)
Religion	Number	Fraction
Roman Catholic Church	33,998	56.9%
None	16,280	27.25%
Evangelical Church	5417	9.07%
Not found out	2588	4.33%
Total	59,749	

In year 2021 was 59,749 people by religion 33,998 from Roman Catholic Church, 16,280 from None, 5417 from Evangelical Church, 2588 from Not found out, 314 from Greek Catholic Church, 217 from Christian Congregations in Slovakia, 165 from Ad hoc movements, 144 from Other, 92 from Eastern Orthodox Church, 83 from Jehovah's Witnesses, 77 from Calvinist Church, 62 from Other and not ascertained christian church, 60 from Buddhism, 52 from Apostolic Church, 47 from United Methodist Church, 46 from Paganism and natural spirituality, 27 from Islam, 20 from Old Catholic Church, 14 from Baptists Church, 10 from Jewish community, 10 from Seventh-day Adventist Church, 8 from Hinduism, 6 from Czechoslovak Hussite Church, 6 from Church of Jesus Christ of Latter-day Saints, 5 from Church of the Brethren and 1 from New Apostolic Church.

== Municipalities ==
Municipality	Area [km^{2}]	Population
Bílkove Humence	4.09	192
Borský Mikuláš	49.98	4,038
Borský Svätý Jur	39.71	1,598
Cerová	21.95	1,085
Čáry	14.94	1,277
Častkov	13.18	563
Dojč	20.36	1,383
Hlboké	20.22	1,069
Hradište pod Vrátnom	25.19	674
Jablonica	31.43	2,215
Koválov	13.62	678
Kuklov	18.70	751
Kúty	27.07	3,979
Lakšárska Nová Ves	36.93	1,090
Moravský Svätý Ján	39.21	2,136
Osuské	11.60	589
Plavecký Peter	14.78	599
Podbranč	14.13	593
Prietrž	24.68	734
Prievaly	15.00	932
Rohov	4.56	376
Rovensko	10.40	434
Rybky	5.77	412
Sekule	23.24	1,745
Senica	50.33	18,970
Smolinské	15.69	931
Smrdáky	4.72	558
Sobotište	32.25	1,492
Šajdíkove Humence	15.52	1,077
Šaštín-Stráže	41.95	4,848
Štefanov	22.08	1,566

Population and area values are current for year 2025.
