= Štefanov =

- Municipality
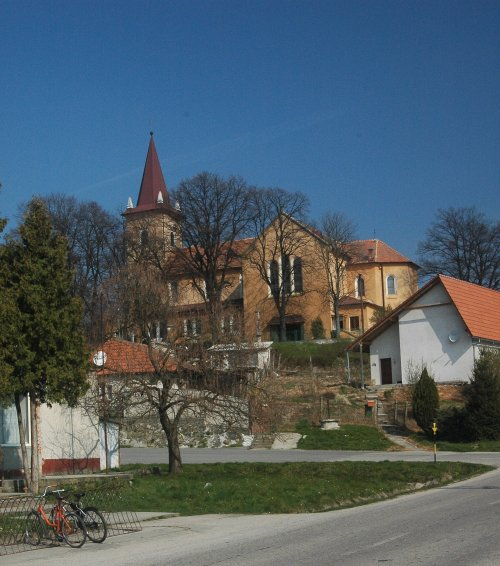

- Flag

- Location of Štefanov in the Trnava Region Location of Štefanov in Slovakia
- Coordinates: 48.68°N 17.20°E
- Country: Slovakia
- Region: Trnava Region
- District: Senica District
- First mentioned: 1392

Area
  - Total: 22.08 km^{2} (8.53 sq mi)
- Elevation: 187 m (614 ft)

Population (2025)
  - Total: 1,566
- Time zone: UTC+1 (CET)
  - Summer (DST): UTC+2 (CEST)
- Postal code: 906 45
- Area code: +421 34
- Vehicle registration plate (until 2022): SE
- Website: www.stefanovobec.sk

Štefanov (Hungarian: Csépányfalva) is a village and municipality in Senica District in the Trnava Region of western Slovakia.

== History ==
In historical records the village was first mentioned in 1392. The church in the village is a Catholic Church built in 1937.

== Geography ==
The municipality lies at an altitude of 187 metres (614 ft) and covers an area of 22.08 km^{2} (8.53 sq mi) (2025). It is located in the Záhorie region of Western Slovakia, on the edge between plains and hills.

== Population ==
Population statistic (10 years)
Year	1995	2005	2015	2025
Count	1644	1641	1648	1566
Difference		−0.18%	+0.42%	−4.97%

Population statistic
Year	2024	2025
Count	1595	1566
Difference		−1.81%

It has a population of 1566 people (31 December 2025).

=== Ethnicity ===
Census 2021 (1+ %)
Ethnicity	Number	Fraction
Slovak	1586	96.82%
Romani	101	6.16%
Not found out	70	4.27%
Total	1638	

In year 2021 was 1638 people by ethnicity 1586 as Slovak, 101 as Romani, 70 as Not found out, 4 as Czech, 3 as Other, 2 as Italian, 2 as German, 1 as Irish, 1 as Moravian, 1 as Hungarian and 1 as Croatian.

Note on population: The difference values of population numbers in the table "Population statistic" and in the sections "Ethnicity" & "Religion" is caused by the use of various statistical methods.

=== Religion ===
Census 2021 (1+ %)
Religion	Number	Fraction
Roman Catholic Church	1250	76.31%
None	265	16.18%
Evangelical Church	36	2.2%
Not found out	30	1.83%
Christian Congregations in Slovakia	24	1.47%
Total	1638	

In year 2021 was 1638 people by religion 1250 from Roman Catholic Church, 265 from None, 36 from Evangelical Church, 30 from Not found out, 24 from Christian Congregations in Slovakia, 9 from Other, 8 from Greek Catholic Church, 7 from Paganism and natural spirituality, 5 from Calvinist Church, 2 from Ad hoc movements, 1 from Other and not ascertained christian church and 1 from United Methodist Church.
