= Šaštín-Stráže =

Town in Slovakia

- Municipality
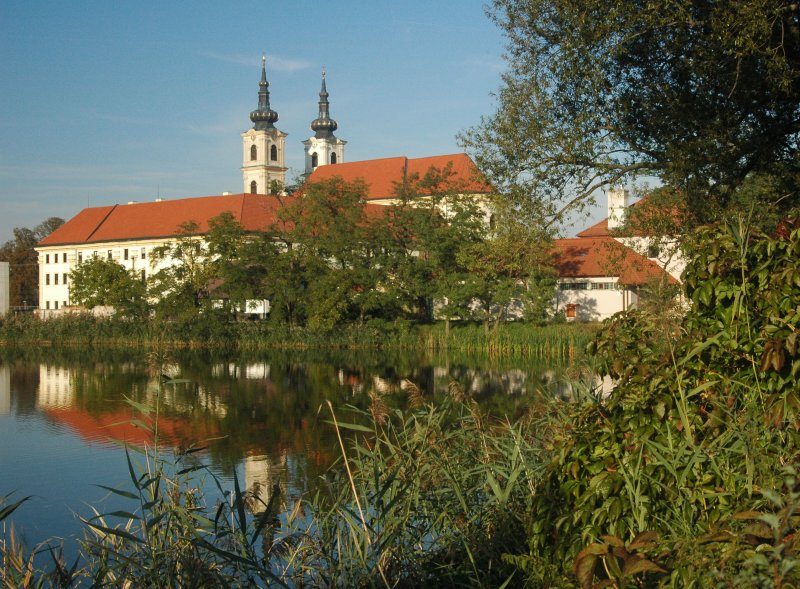
- A basilica in Šaštín

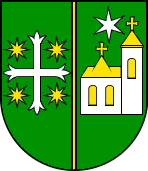
- Flag Coat of arms

- Location of Šaštín-Stráže in the Trnava Region Location of Šaštín-Stráže in Slovakia
- Coordinates: 48.64°N 17.15°E
- Country: Slovakia
- Region: Trnava Region
- District: Senica District
- First mentioned: 1294

Government
  - Mayor: Radovan Prstek

Area
  - Total: 41.95 km^{2} (16.20 sq mi)
- Elevation: 170 m (560 ft)

Population (2025)
  - Total: 4,848
- Time zone: UTC+1 (CET)
  - Summer (DST): UTC+2 (CEST)
- Postal code: 908 41
- Area code: +421 34
- Vehicle registration plate (until 2022): SE
- Website: www.mestosastinstraze.sk

Šaštín-Stráže (German: Schoßberg-Strascha, Hungarian: Sasvár–Morvaőr, Turkish: Şaşvar) is a town in the Senica District, Trnava Region in western Slovakia. Originally two separate villages, now it is one of the youngest towns in Slovakia, having received town privileges on 1 September 2001.

== Etymology ==
The name "Šaštín" consists of two parts: šáš (šašina, šáchor, present also in other Slavic languages – a sedge) and týn (initially a fence, later also a small medieval fort). The name Stráže (guards) refers to a historic settlement of border guards.

== Geography ==
The municipality lies at an altitude of 170 metres (560 ft) and covers an area of 41.95 km^{2} (16.20 sq mi) (2025).

The town lies in the Záhorie lowlands, around 18 km (11 mi) from Senica and 65 km (40 mi) from Bratislava. The Myjava River flows through the town, dividing the town's two parts.

== History ==
The first written mention about Šaštín-Stráže was in 1218. Although the town's two parts, Šaštín and Stráže nad Myjavou were for long two separate villages, their history is closely connected to each other. The villages merged in 1961 under name Šaštínske Stráže, changed in 1971 to the current name.

== Population ==
Population statistic (10 years)
Year	1995	2005	2015	2025
Count	4862	5056	5101	4848
Difference		+3.99%	+0.89%	−4.95%

Population statistic
Year	2024	2025
Count	4851	4848
Difference		−0.06%

It has a population of 4848 people (31 December 2025).

=== Ethnicity ===
Census 2021 (1+ %)
Ethnicity	Number	Fraction
Slovak	4699	94.37%
Not found out	171	3.43%
Romani	131	2.63%
Czech	56	1.12%
Total	4979	

In year 2021 was 4979 people by ethnicity 4699 as Slovak, 171 as Not found out, 131 as Romani, 56 as Czech, 10 as Other, 9 as Italian, 8 as German, 7 as Hungarian, 5 as Moravian, 4 as Vietnamese, 4 as Rusyn, 4 as Romanian, 4 as Austrian, 3 as Polish, 2 as Serbian, 2 as English, 1 as Ukrainian and 1 as Croatian.

Note on population: The difference values of population numbers in the table "Population statistic" and in the sections "Ethnicity" & "Religion" is caused by the use of various statistical methods.

=== Religion ===
Census 2021 (1+ %)
Religion	Number	Fraction
Roman Catholic Church	3630	72.91%
None	933	18.74%
Not found out	226	4.54%
Evangelical Church	70	1.41%
Total	4979	

In year 2021 was 4979 people by religion 3630 from Roman Catholic Church, 933 from None, 226 from Not found out, 70 from Evangelical Church, 38 from Christian Congregations in Slovakia, 22 from Greek Catholic Church, 14 from Other, 12 from Other and not ascertained christian church, 7 from Old Catholic Church, 6 from Calvinist Church, 5 from Eastern Orthodox Church, 5 from Ad hoc movements, 4 from Jehovah's Witnesses, 3 from Buddhism, 2 from Paganism and natural spirituality, 1 from Church of Jesus Christ of Latter-day Saints and 1 from Apostolic Church.

According to the 2001 census, the town had 5,005 inhabitants. 95.44% of inhabitants were Slovaks, 2.06% Roma and 1.50% Czechs. The religious makeup was 88.45% Roman Catholics, 7.31% people with no religious affiliation, and 1.34% Lutherans.

== Importance ==
Šaštín-Stráže is one of the most important Marian shrines in Slovakia. Several pilgrimages are held there annually, especially on Pentecost and Our Lady of Sorrows Day (15 September).

== Twin towns – sister cities ==
Šaštín-Stráže is twinned with:

- Bełżyce, Poland
- Brody, Ukraine
