= Osuské =

- Municipality
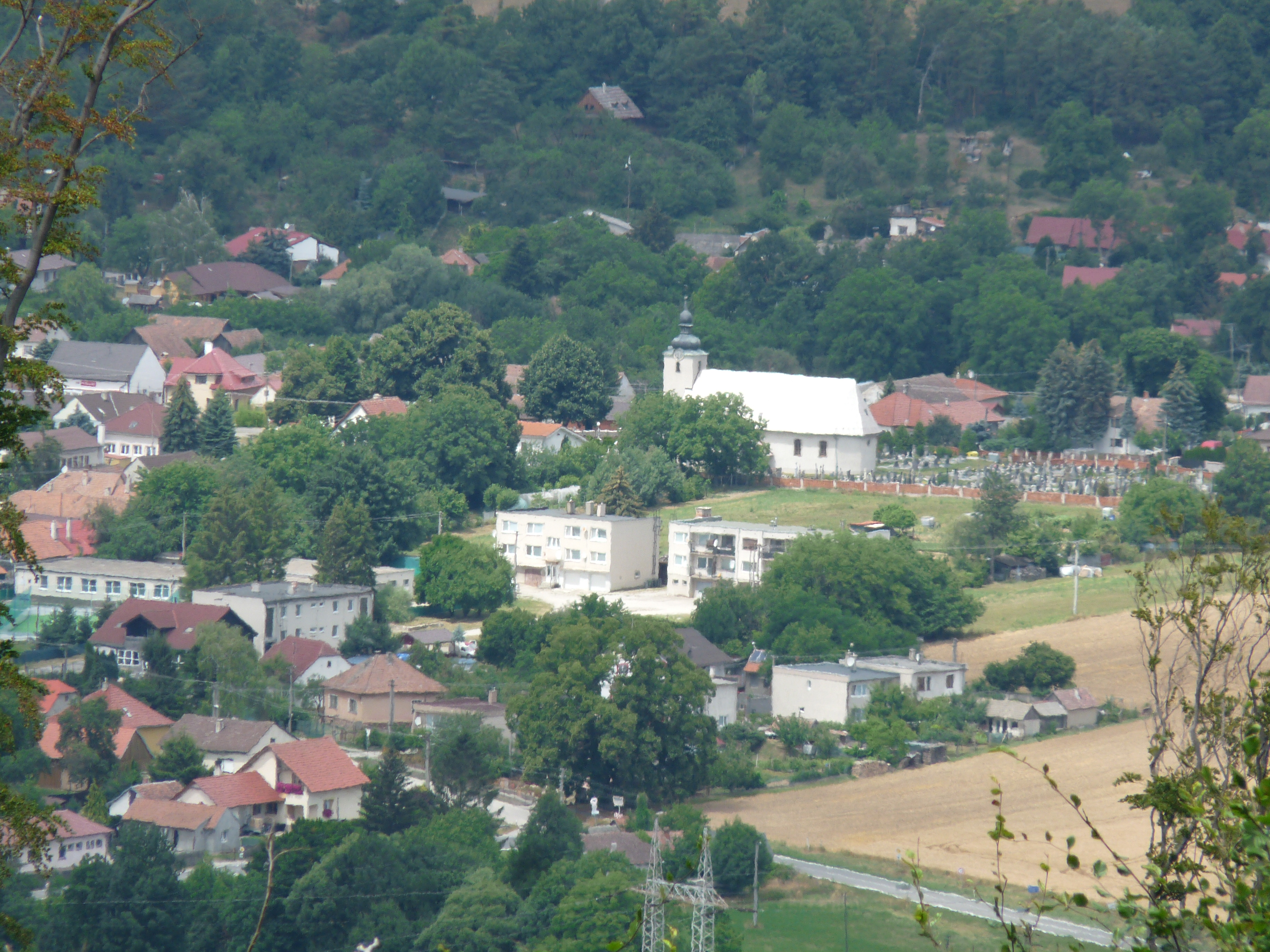

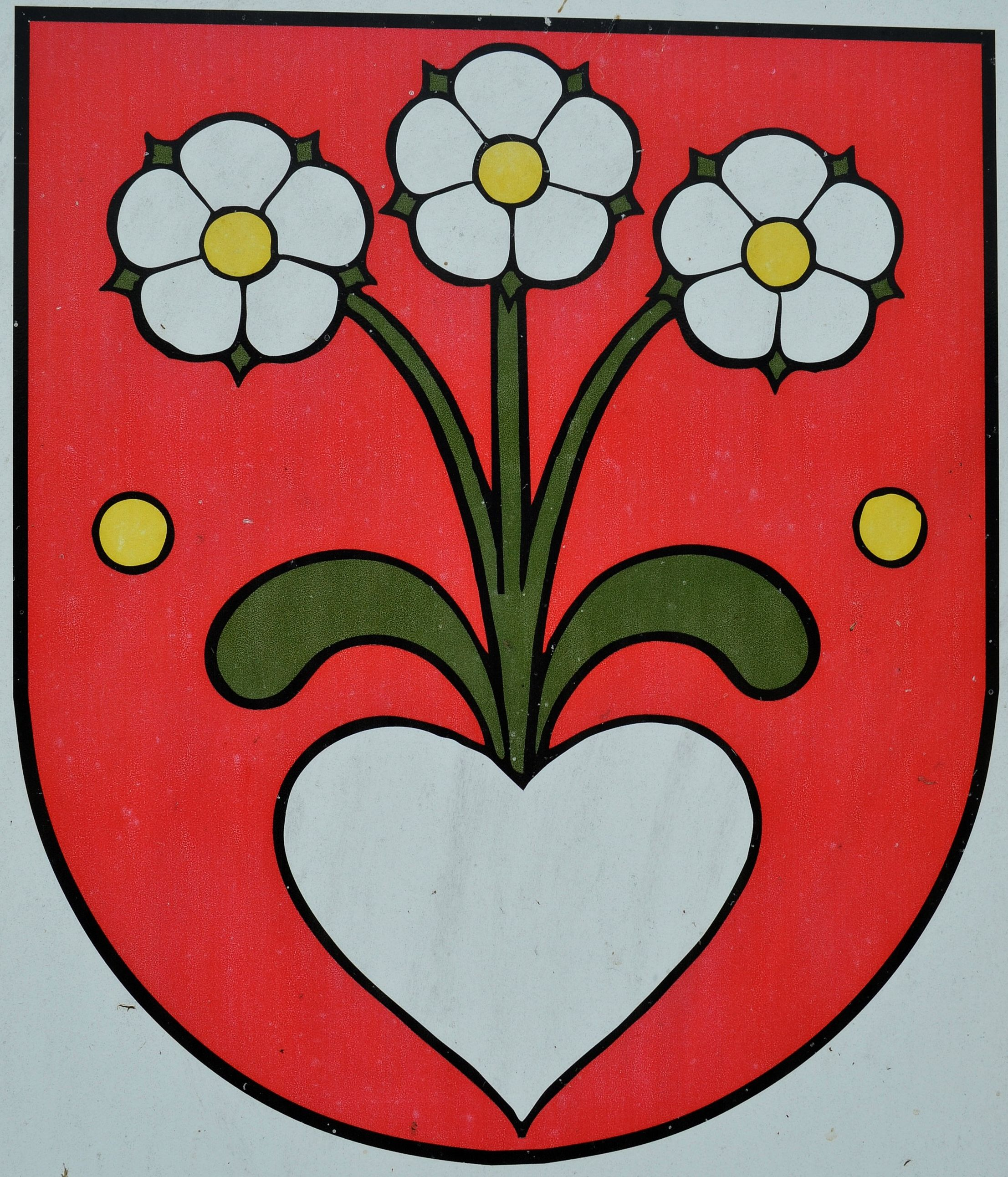
- Flag Coat of arms

- Location of Osuské in the Trnava Region Location of Osuské in Slovakia
- Coordinates: 48.63°N 17.43°E
- Country: Slovakia
- Region: Trnava Region
- District: Senica District
- First mentioned: 1262

Area
  - Total: 11.60 km^{2} (4.48 sq mi)
- Elevation: 218 m (715 ft)

Population (2025)
  - Total: 589
- Time zone: UTC+1 (CET)
  - Summer (DST): UTC+2 (CEST)
- Postal code: 906 12
- Area code: +421 34
- Vehicle registration plate (until 2022): SE
- Website: osuske.sk

Osuské (Hungarian: Aszós) is a village and municipality in Senica District in the Trnava Region of western Slovakia. There is a Catholic church first mentioned in 1468 with an organ rebuilt in 1844. Osuské was well known by a unique costume used especially at Mass on Sunday or in celebration time until the middle of the 20th century.

== History ==
In historical records the village was first mentioned in 1262.

== Geography ==
The municipality lies at an altitude of 218 metres (715 ft) and covers an area of 11.60 km^{2} (4.48 sq mi) (2025).

== Population ==
Population statistic (10 years)
Year	1995	2005	2015	2025
Count	632	604	602	589
Difference		−4.43%	−0.33%	−2.15%

Population statistic
Year	2024	2025
Count	587	589
Difference		+0.34%

It has a population of 589 people (31 December 2025).

=== Ethnicity ===
Census 2021 (1+ %)
Ethnicity	Number	Fraction
Slovak	594	97.53%
Not found out	12	1.97%
Total	609	

In year 2021 was 609 people by ethnicity 594 as Slovak, 12 as Not found out, 4 as Romani, 2 as Czech, 1 as Serbian, 1 as Russian, 1 as Austrian and 1 as English.

Note on population: The difference values of population numbers in the table "Population statistic" and in the sections "Ethnicity" & "Religion" is caused by the use of various statistical methods.

=== Religion ===
Census 2021 (1+ %)
Religion	Number	Fraction
Roman Catholic Church	274	44.99%
None	193	31.69%
Not found out	82	13.46%
Evangelical Church	40	6.57%
Total	609	

In year 2021 was 609 people by religion 274 from Roman Catholic Church, 193 from None, 82 from Not found out, 40 from Evangelical Church, 5 from Greek Catholic Church, 4 from Christian Congregations in Slovakia, 4 from Islam, 2 from Eastern Orthodox Church, 2 from Jehovah's Witnesses, 1 from Old Catholic Church, 1 from Buddhism and 1 from Ad hoc movements.
