= Rohov, Senica District =

Rohov
- Municipality
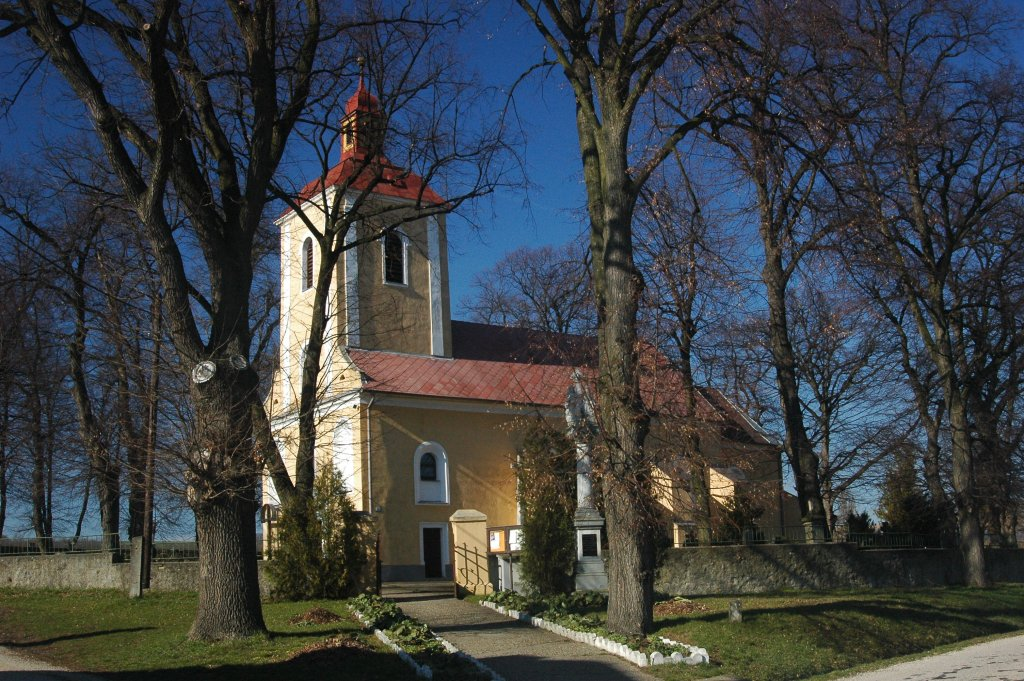

- Flag

- Location of Rohov in the Trnava Region Location of Rohov in Slovakia
- Coordinates: 48°44′0″N 17°21′0″E
- Country: Slovakia
- Region: Trnava Region
- District: Senica District
- First mentioned: 1471

Area
  - Total: 4.56 km^{2} (1.76 sq mi)
- Elevation: 240 m (790 ft)

Population (2025)
  - Total: 376
- Time zone: UTC+1 (CET)
  - Summer (DST): UTC+2 (CEST)
- Postal code: 906 04
- Area code: +421 34
- Vehicle registration plate (until 2022): SE
- Website: www.rohov.sk

Rohov (Hungarian: Rohó) is a village and municipality in Senica District in the Trnava Region of western Slovakia.

== History ==
In historical records the village was first mentioned in 1471.

== Geography ==
The municipality lies at an altitude of 240 metres (790 ft) and covers an area of 4.56 km^{2} (1.76 sq mi) (2025).

== Population ==
Population statistic (10 years)
Year	1995	2005	2015	2025
Count	391	387	411	376
Difference		−1.02%	+6.20%	−8.51%

Population statistic
Year	2024	2025
Count	382	376
Difference		−1.57%

It has a population of 376 people (31 December 2025).

=== Ethnicity ===
Census 2021 (1+ %)
Ethnicity	Number	Fraction
Slovak	376	98.17%
Not found out	5	1.3%
Total	383	

In year 2021 was 383 people by ethnicity 376 as Slovak, 5 as Not found out, 2 as Czech, 1 as Vietnamese and 1 as Hungarian.

Note on population: The difference values of population numbers in the table "Population statistic" and in the sections "Ethnicity" & "Religion" is caused by the use of various statistical methods.

=== Religion ===
Census 2021 (1+ %)
Religion	Number	Fraction
Roman Catholic Church	267	69.71%
None	103	26.89%
Evangelical Church	5	1.31%
Not found out	4	1.04%
Total	383	

In year 2021 was 383 people by religion 267 from Roman Catholic Church, 103 from None, 5 from Evangelical Church, 4 from Not found out, 3 from Greek Catholic Church and 1 from Buddhism.
