= Borský Svätý Jur =

Village in Trnava Region, Slovakia

- Municipality
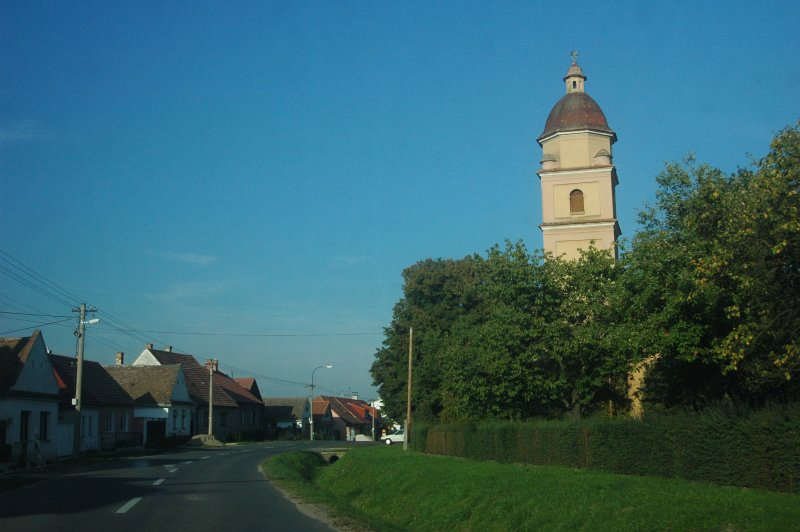

- Flag

- Location of Borský Svätý Jur in the Trnava Region Location of Borský Svätý Jur in Slovakia
- Coordinates: 48.62°N 17.05°E
- Country: Slovakia
- Region: Trnava Region
- District: Senica District
- First mentioned: 1394

Area
  - Total: 39.71 km^{2} (15.33 sq mi)
- Elevation: 174 m (571 ft)

Population (2025)
  - Total: 1,598
- Time zone: UTC+1 (CET)
  - Summer (DST): UTC+2 (CEST)
- Postal code: 908 79
- Area code: +421 34
- Vehicle registration plate (until 2022): SE
- Website: commons.wikimedia.org/wiki/File:Borsky_svaty_jur.jpg

Borský Svätý Jur (German: Bur-Sankt-Georg; Hungarian: Búrszentgyörgy) is a village and municipality in Senica District in the Trnava Region of western Slovakia.

== History ==
In historical records the village was first mentioned in 1393.

It is mentioned in a deed wherebye Sigismund, Holy Roman Emperor granted Elesko castle and its demesnes to the Polish nobleman Stibor as a reward for his service. The Hungarian name probably stems from the churches patron Saint George. The church predates the 1394 mention. It is later called by the names Zenthgwrt in 1466, and Zenthgergh in 1564. The village had a post stop in the 18th century. In the 19th century it belonged to the éleskő-szentjánosi estate. In the 1910 census it had 2047 inhabitants, the majority of whom were ethnic Slovak. Before the Treaty of Trianon it was in the Malacka district of Pozsony county (comitatus) in the Kingdom of Hungary.

A Roman Catholic church of Saint George was built in 1676, and a chateau in 1844.

== Geography ==
The municipality lies at an altitude of 174 metres (571 ft) and covers an area of 39.71 km^{2} (15.33 sq mi) (2025).

== Population ==
Population statistic (10 years)
Year	1995	2005	2015	2025
Count	1567	1562	1645	1598
Difference		−0.31%	+5.31%	−2.85%

Population statistic
Year	2024	2025
Count	1603	1598
Difference		−0.31%

It has a population of 1598 people (31 December 2025).

=== Ethnicity ===
Census 2021 (1+ %)
Ethnicity	Number	Fraction
Slovak	1574	96.5%
Not found out	35	2.14%
Czech	27	1.65%
Total	1631	

In year 2021 was 1631 people by ethnicity 1574 as Slovak, 35 as Not found out, 27 as Czech, 8 as Romanian, 4 as Romani, 4 as Hungarian, 3 as Other, 2 as Russian, 2 as Moravian, 1 as Irish, 1 as Ukrainian, 1 as Silesian, 1 as Austrian and 1 as German.

Note on population: The difference values of population numbers in the table "Population statistic" and in the sections "Ethnicity" & "Religion" is caused by the use of various statistical methods.

=== Religion ===
Census 2021 (1+ %)
Religion	Number	Fraction
Roman Catholic Church	1177	72.16%
None	353	21.64%
Not found out	43	2.64%
Total	1631	

In year 2021 was 1631 people by religion 1177 from Roman Catholic Church, 353 from None, 43 from Not found out, 13 from Evangelical Church, 8 from Christian Congregations in Slovakia, 7 from Baptists Church, 6 from Eastern Orthodox Church, 6 from Greek Catholic Church, 4 from Calvinist Church, 4 from Other, 3 from Paganism and natural spirituality, 3 from Buddhism, 1 from Hinduism, 1 from United Methodist Church, 1 from Czechoslovak Hussite Church and 1 from Church of the Brethren.

== Genealogical resources ==
The records for genealogical research are available at the state archive "Statny Archiv in Bratislava, Slovakia"

- Roman Catholic church records (births/marriages/deaths): 1633-1938 (parish A)

== See also ==
- Svätý Jur
- List of municipalities and towns in Slovakia
