= Culture of Slovakia =

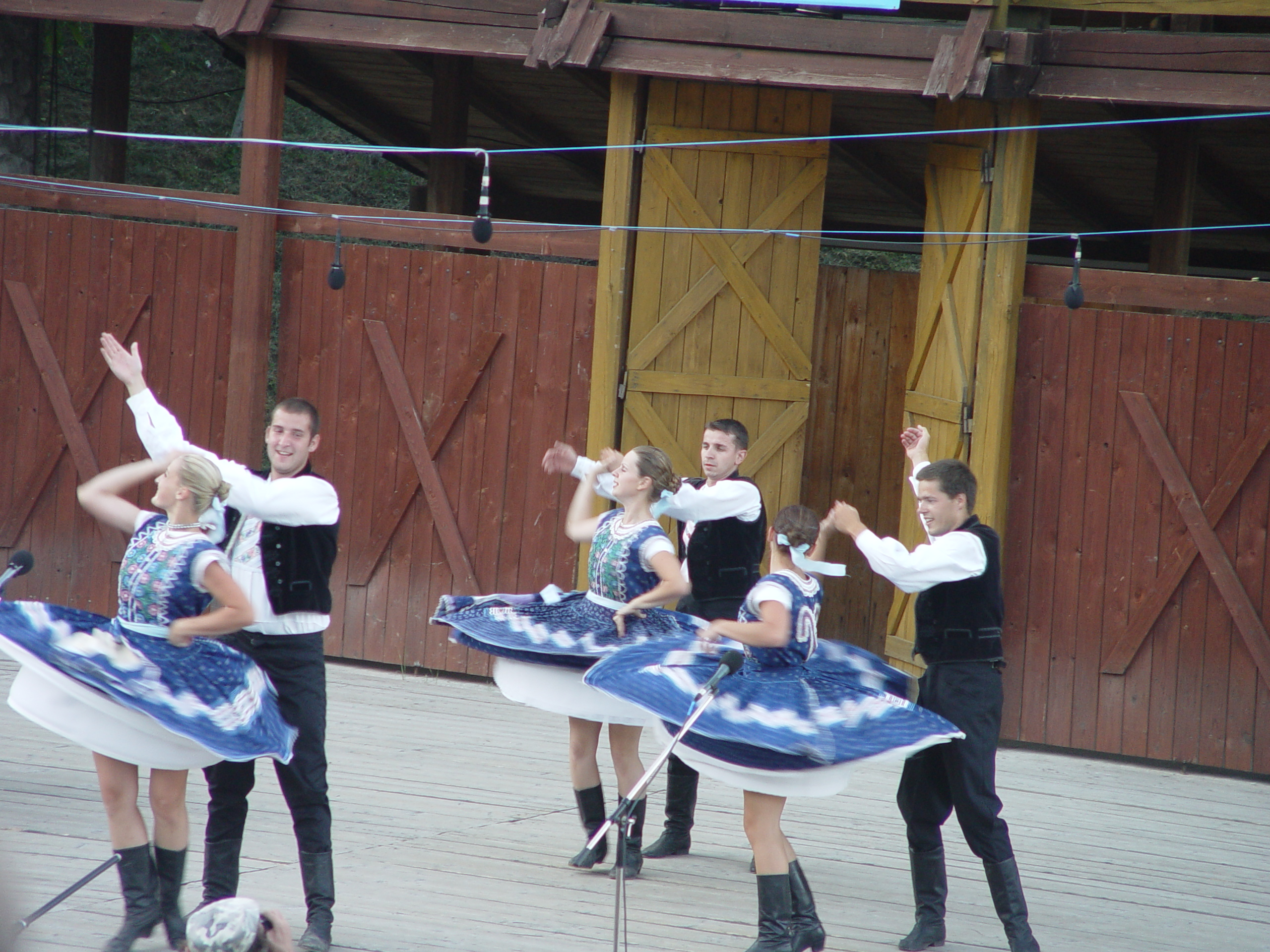
Slovak folk dance

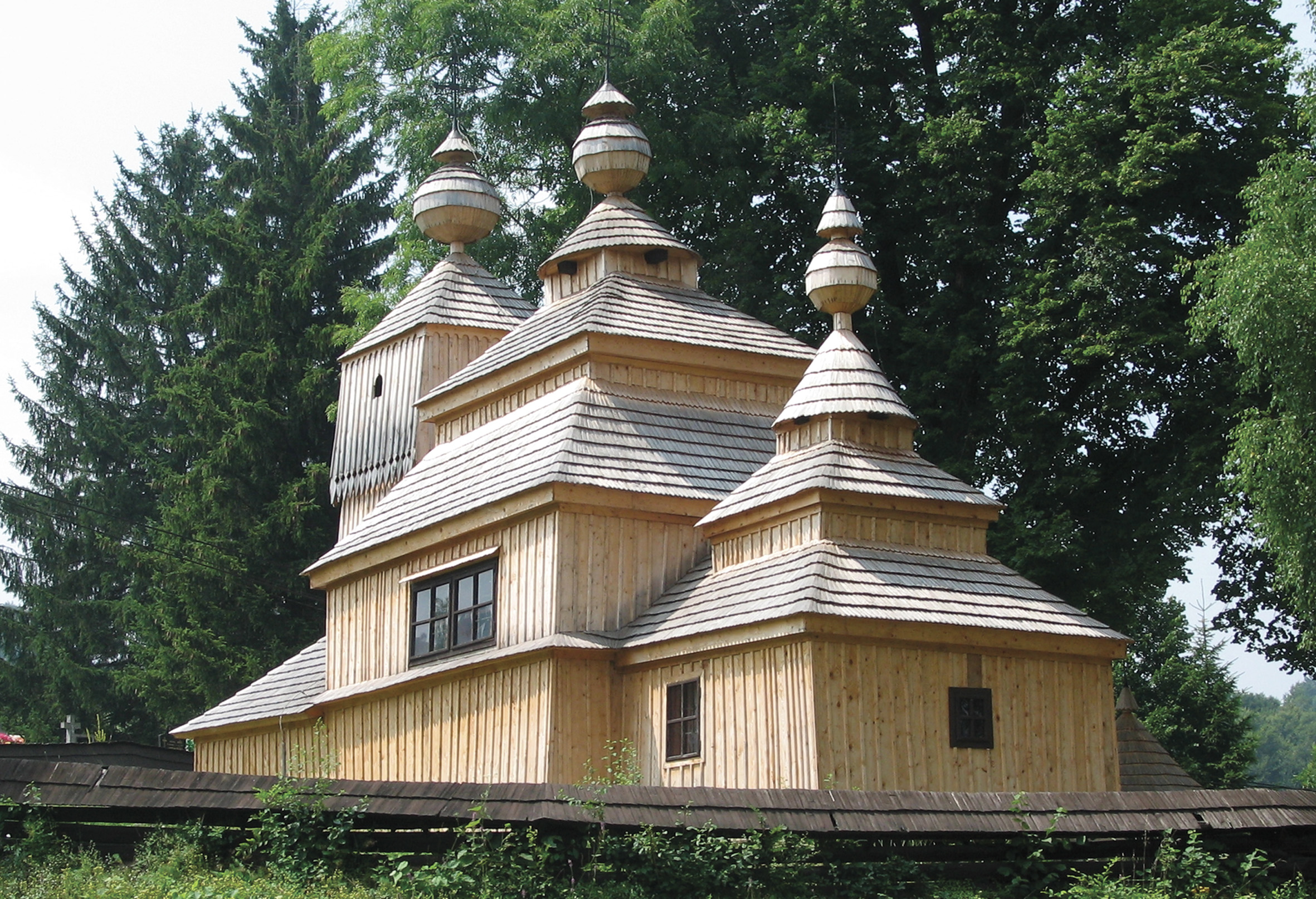
This wooden church in Bodružal is an example of Rusyn folk architecture and is a UNESCO World Heritage Site

The culture of Slovakia is influenced by its Catholic culture, its various folk traditions, and its location in Central Europe. Slovak culture shares certain similarities with the cultural traditions of its neighbouring countries: Poland, Ukraine, Hungary, Austria and Czech Republic.

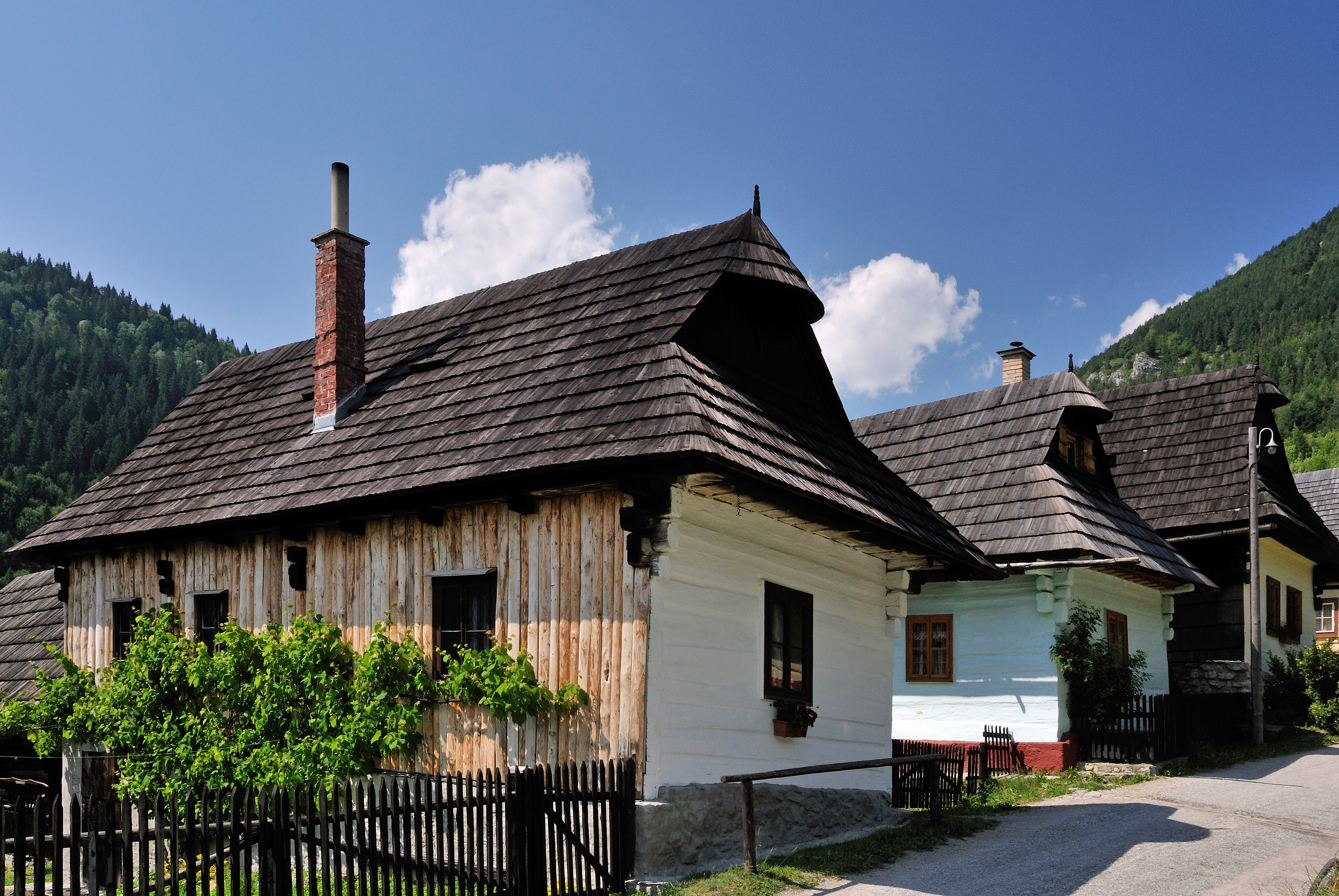
Wooden folk architecture can be seen in the well preserved village of Vlkolínec, a UNESCO World Heritage Site

== Folk tradition ==
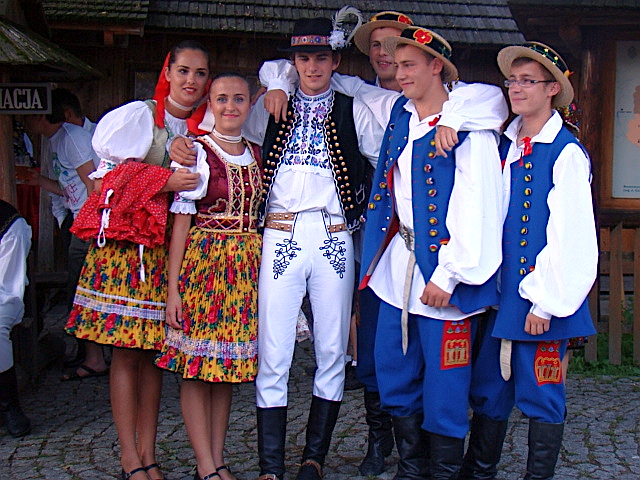
Slovaks wearing folk costumes from Eastern Slovakia

Folk tradition has rooted strongly in Slovakia and is reflected in literature, music, dance and architecture. The prime example is a Slovak national anthem, "Nad Tatrou sa blýska", which is based on a melody from "Kopala studienku" folk song.

Manifestation of Slovak folklore culture is the "Východná" Folklore Festival. It is the oldest and largest nationwide festival with international participation, which takes place in Východná annually. Slovakia is usually represented by many groups but mainly by SĽUK (Slovenský ľudový umelecký kolektív—Slovak folk art collective). SĽUK is the largest Slovak folk art group, trying to preserve the folklore tradition.

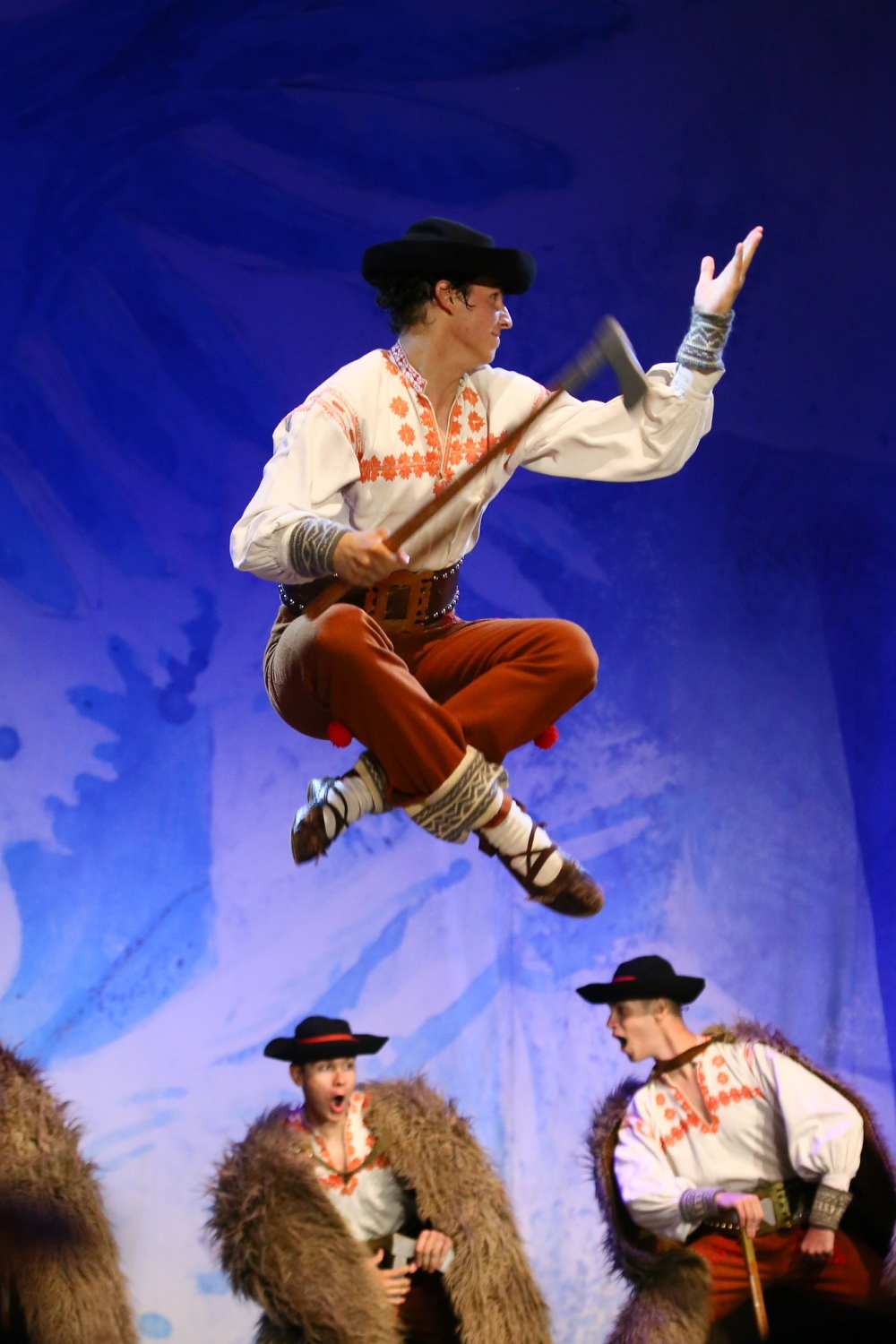
Male Slovak folk dancers

An example of wooden folk architecture in Slovakia can be seen in the well preserved village of Vlkolínec which has been the UNESCO World Heritage Site since 1993. The Prešov Region preserves the world's most remarkable folk wooden churches. Most of them are protected by Slovak law as cultural heritage, but some of them are on the UNESCO list too, in Bodružal, Hervartov, Ladomirová and Ruská Bystrá.

The best known Slovak hero, found in many folk mythologies, is Juraj Jánošík (1688–1713) (the Slovak equivalent of Robin Hood). The legend claims he would take from the rich and give to the poor. Jánošík's life was depicted in a list of literature works and many movies throughout the 20th century. One of the most popular is a film Jánošík directed by Martin Frič in 1935.

== Art ==
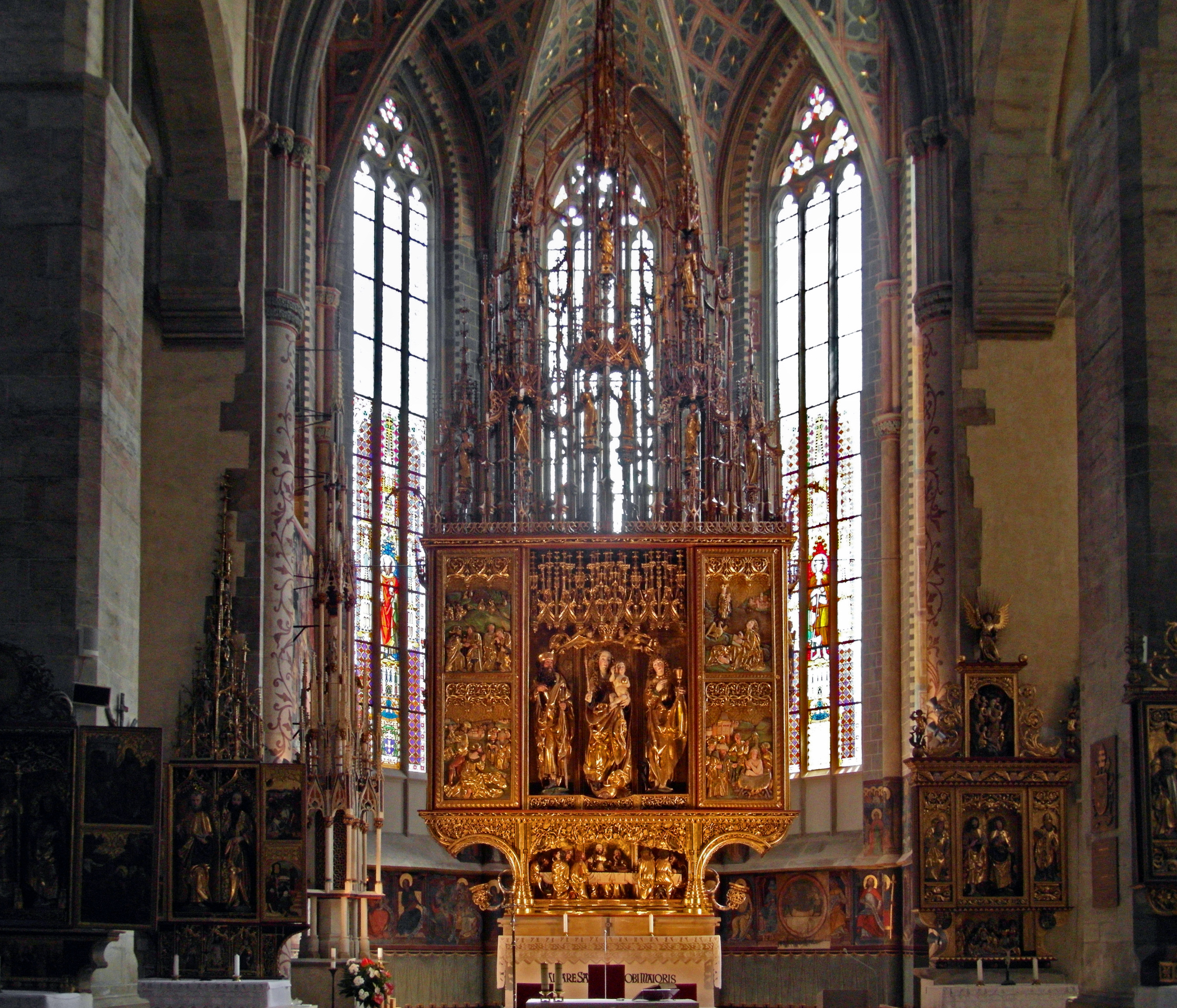
Main altar in Basilica of St. James from the workshop of Master Paul of Levoča, highest wooden altar in the world, 1517

Visual art in Slovakia is represented through painting, drawing, printmaking, illustration, arts and crafts, sculpture, photography or conceptual art. The Slovak National Gallery founded in 1948, is the biggest network of galleries in Slovakia. Two displays in Bratislava are situated in Esterházy Palace (Esterházyho palác) and the Water Barracks (Vodné kasárne), adjacent one to another. They are located on the Danube riverfront in the Old Town.

The Bratislava City Gallery, founded in 1961 is the second biggest Slovak gallery of its kind. It stores about 35,000 pieces of Slovak and international art and offers permanent displays in Pálffy Palace and Mirbach Palace, located in the Old Town. Danubiana Art Museum, one of the youngest art museums in Europe, is situated near Čunovo waterworks (part of Gabčíkovo Waterworks). Other major galleries include: Andy Warhol Museum of Modern Art (Warhol's parents were from Miková), East Slovak Gallery, Ernest Zmeták Art Gallery, Zvolen Castle.

== Architecture ==
The buildings were constructed from various building materials with characteristic architecture. In the more mountainous parts of Slovakia it was often wood. The roofs were covered with wooden shingles and ornate gables. For the construction of simpler dwellings was also used clay with straw. Such buildings were typical especially for the southern parts of Slovakia, Záhorie and Považie. Earthen buildings were built by "charging" technology, when the induced clay was compressed, charged perpendicularly between the slab formwork, creating both the peripheral and transverse walls of the house.

The typical architecture of individual regions is preserved by the folk architecture conservation reserves. The most famous are Velké Leváre, Brhlovce, Sebechleby, Čičmany, Špania Dolina, Vlkolínec, Podbiel and Ždiar. There are currently 10 open-air museums in Slovakia. They are located in various parts of the country: Museum of the Slovak Village in Martin on Turci, Vychylovka in Kysuce, Zuberec in Orava, Pribylina in Liptov, Svidník in Saris, Humenne in Zemplin, Nitra in the Danube region, etc.

There are also many castles, chateaus, churches, manor houses and other cultural monuments in Slovakia. According to some sources, Slovakia has the highest concentration of castles per capita. A more durable stone was used in their construction. Interesting are also urban monument reserves, which are in most of historical cities: Bratislava, Banska Stiavnica, Kosice, Bardejov, Levoca, Banska Bystrica and others. An integral part of Slovak architecture are wooden churches, which have been built on the local territory since the second half of the 15th century. At present, there are around 40 wooden churches in Slovakia. Not all of them are accessible and some of them are part of open-air museums.

== Literature ==
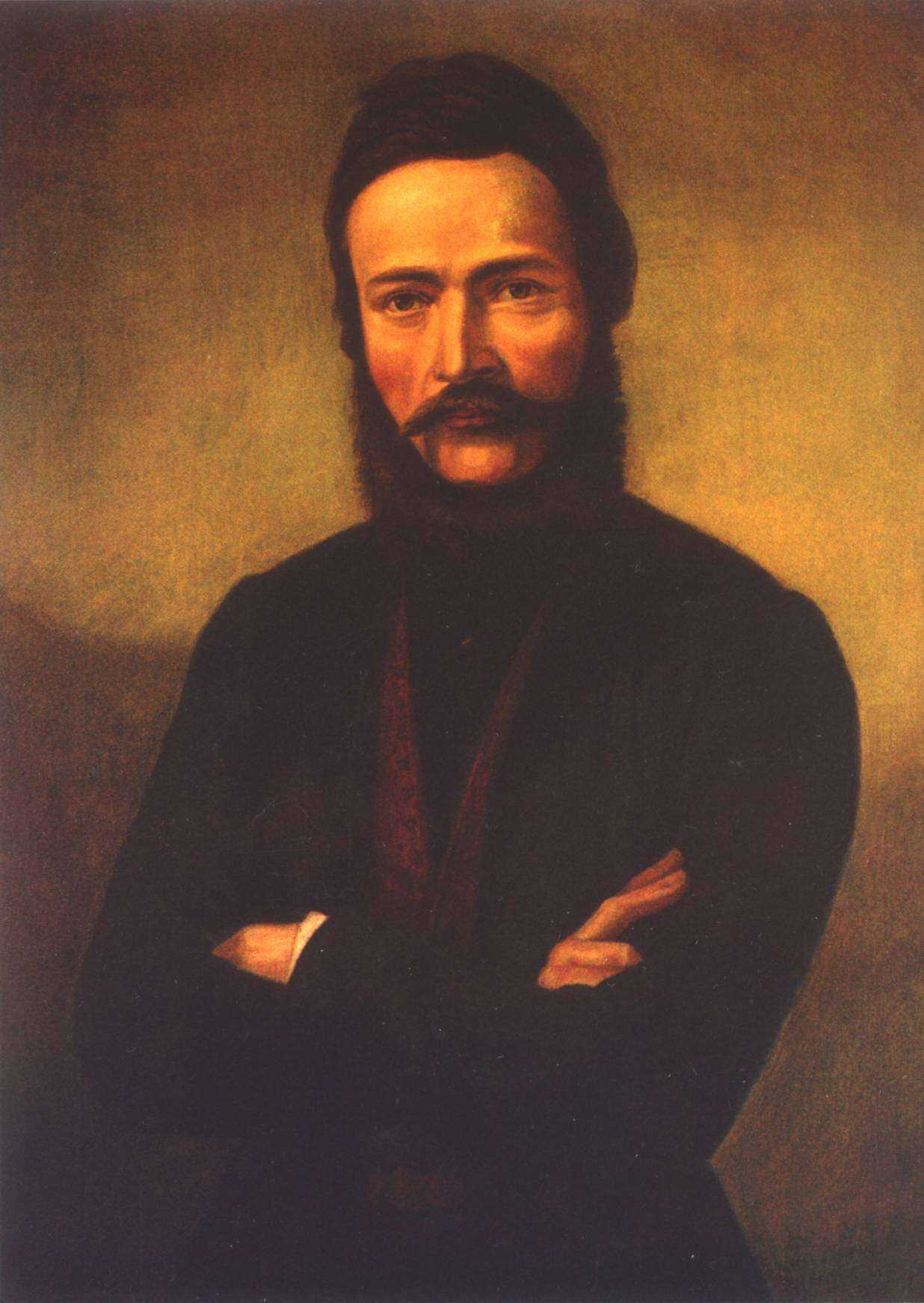
Ľudovít Štúr, the author of the Slovak language standard

For a list of notable Slovak writers and poets, see List of Slovak authors.

Christian topics include: poem Proglas as a foreword to the four Gospels, partial translations of the Bible into Old Church Slavonic, Zakon sudnyj ljudem.

Medieval literature, in the period from the 11th to the 15th centuries, was written in Latin, Czech and Slovakised Czech. Lyric (prayers, songs and formulas) was still controlled by the Church, while epic was concentrated on legends. Authors from this period include Johannes de Thurocz, author of the Chronica Hungarorum and Maurus, both of them Hungarians. The worldly literature also emerged and chronicles were written in this period.

There were two leading persons who codified the Slovak language. The first was Anton Bernolák whose concept was based on the western Slovak dialect in 1787. It was the codification of the first ever literary language of Slovaks. The second was Ľudovít Štúr, whose formation of the Slovak language took principles from the central Slovak dialect in 1843.

Slovakia is also known for its polyhistors, of whom include Pavol Jozef Šafárik, Matej Bel, Ján Kollár, and its political revolutionaries and reformists, such Milan Rastislav Štefánik and Alexander Dubček.

== Cuisine ==
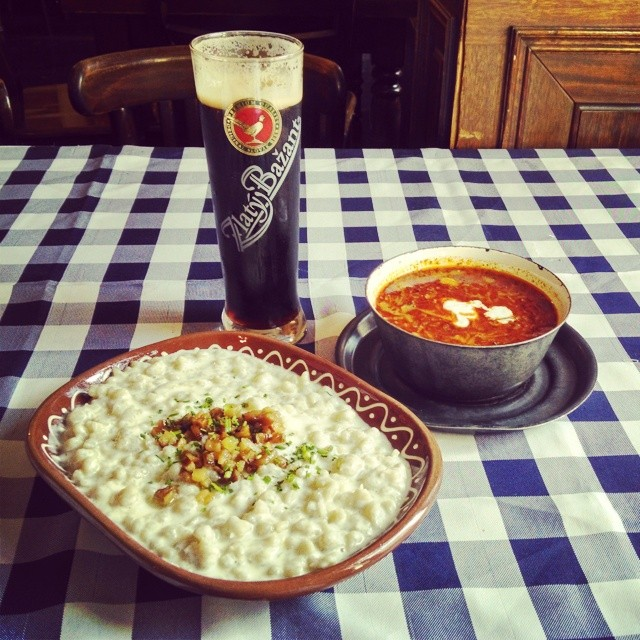
Halušky with bryndza cheese, kapustnica soup and Zlatý Bažant dark beer—examples of Slovak cuisine

Traditional Slovak cuisine is based mainly on pork, poultry (chicken is the most widely eaten, followed by duck, goose, and turkey), flour, potatoes, cabbage, and milk products. It is relatively closely related to Hungarian, Czech and Austrian cuisine. On the east it is also influenced by Ukrainian cuisine. In comparison with other European countries, "game meat" is more accessible in Slovakia due to vast resources of forest and because hunting is relatively popular. Boar, rabbit, and venison are generally available throughout the year. Lamb and goat are eaten but are not widely popular.

The traditional Slovak meals are bryndzové halušky, bryndzové pirohy and other meals with potato dough and bryndza. Bryndza is a salty cheese made of a sheep milk, characterised by a strong taste and aroma. Bryndzové halušky must be on the menu of every traditional Slovak restaurant.

A typical soup is a sauerkraut soup ("kapustnica"). A blood sausage called "krvavnica", made from any and all parts of a butchered pig is also a specific Slovak meal.

Wine is enjoyed throughout Slovakia. Slovak wine comes predominantly from the southern areas along the Danube and its tributaries; the northern half of the country is too cold and mountainous to grow grapevines. Traditionally, white wine was more popular than red or rosé (except in some regions), and sweet wine more popular than dry, but in recent years tastes seem to be changing. Beer (mainly of the pilsener style, though dark lagers are also consumed) is also popular.

== Sport ==
Sporting activities are practised widely in Slovakia, many of them on a professional level. Ice hockey and football have traditionally been regarded as the most popular sports in Slovakia, though tennis, handball, basketball, volleyball, whitewater slalom, cycling, and athletics are also popular.

=== Ice hockey ===
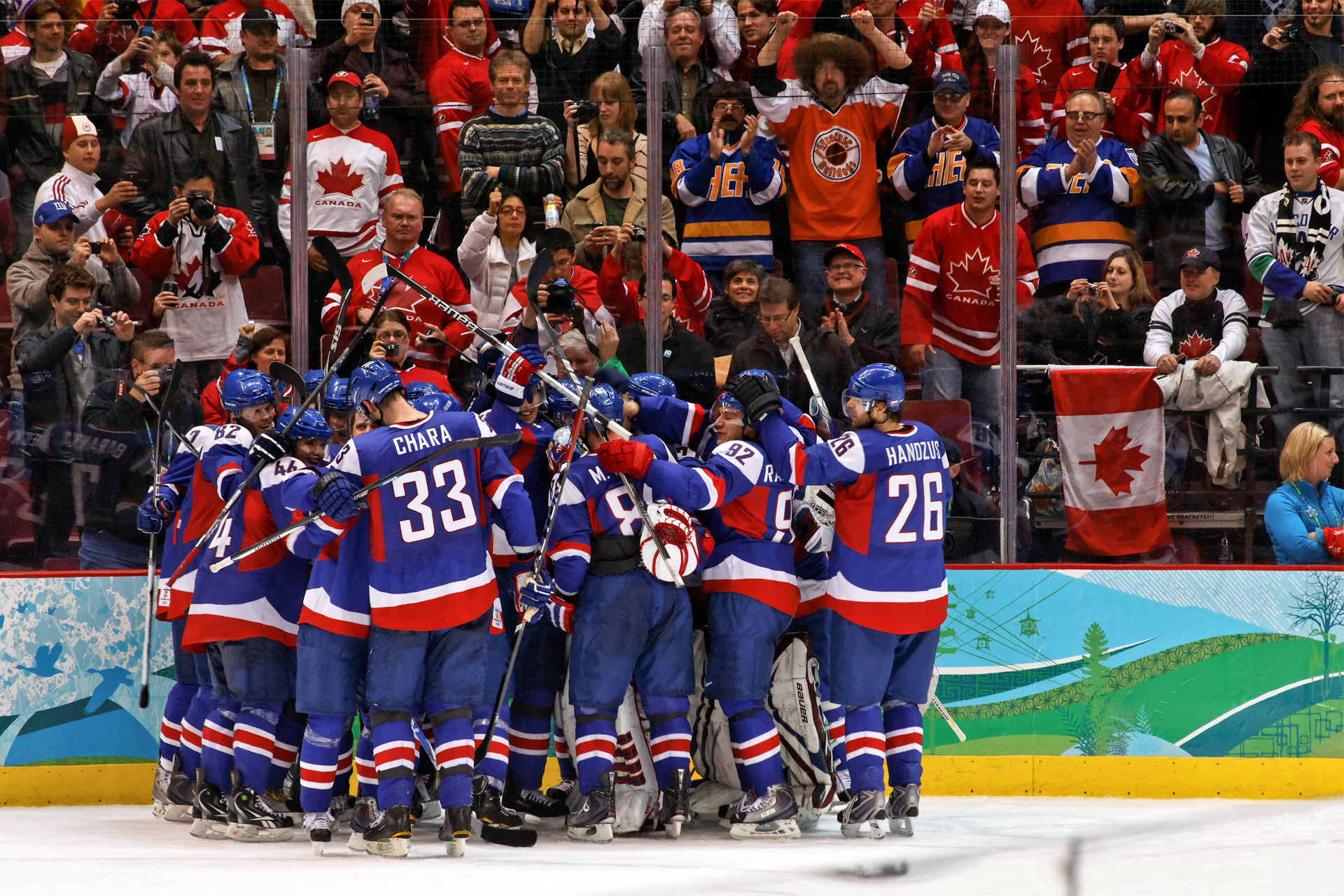
The Slovak national ice hockey team celebrating a victory against Sweden at the 2010 Winter Olympics

One of the most popular team sports in Slovakia is ice hockey. Slovakia became a member of the IIHF on 2 February 1993 and since then has won 4 medals in Ice Hockey World Championships, consisting of 1 gold, 2 silver and 1 bronze. The most recent success was a silver medal at the 2012 IIHF World Championship in Helsinki. The Slovak national hockey team made five appearances in the Olympic games, finishing 4th in the 2010 Winter Olympics in Vancouver. The country has 8,280 registered players and is ranked 7th in the IIHF World Ranking at present. Prior to 2012, the Slovak team HC Slovan Bratislava participated in the Kontinental Hockey League, considered the strongest hockey league in Europe, and the second-best in the world.

Slovakia hosted the 2011 IIHF World Championship, where Finland won the gold medal and 2019 IIHF World Championship, where Finland also won the gold medal. Both competitions took place in Bratislava and Košice.

=== Football ===
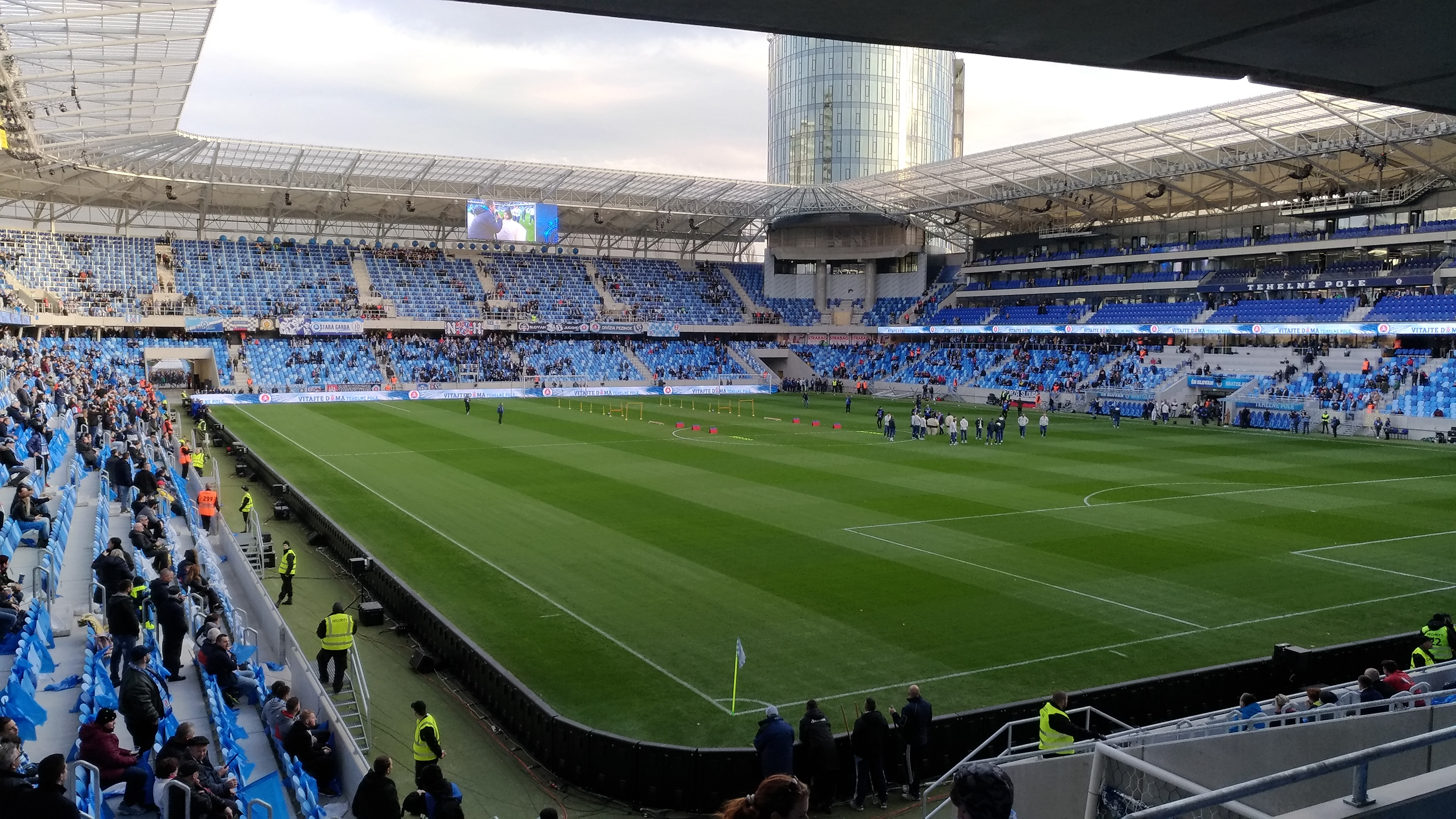
Football stadium Tehelné pole in Bratislava. Association football is the most popular sport in Slovakia.

Association football is the most popular sport in Slovakia, with over 400,000 registered players. Since 1993, the Slovak national football team has qualified for the FIFA World Cup once, in 2010. They progressed to the last 16, where they were defeated by the Netherlands. The most notable result was the 3–2 victory over Italy. In 2016, the Slovak national football team qualified for the UEFA Euro 2016 tournament, under head coach Ján Kozák. This helped the team reach their best ever position of 14th in the FIFA World Rankings.

In club competitions, only three teams have qualified for the UEFA Champions League Group Stage, namely MFK Košice in 1997–98, FC Artmedia Bratislava in 2005–06 season, and MŠK Žilina in 2010–11. FC Artmedia Bratislava has been the most successful team, finishing 3rd at the group stage of the UEFA Cup, therefore qualifying for the knockout stage. They remain the only Slovak club that has won a match at the group stage.

== See also ==
- Outline of Slovakia
- Cinema of Slovakia
- List of libraries in Slovakia
- Music of Slovakia
- Museums in Slovakia
- Slovak language
- Slovak literature
- Slovak national weapon
