= Vlkolínec =

- Village
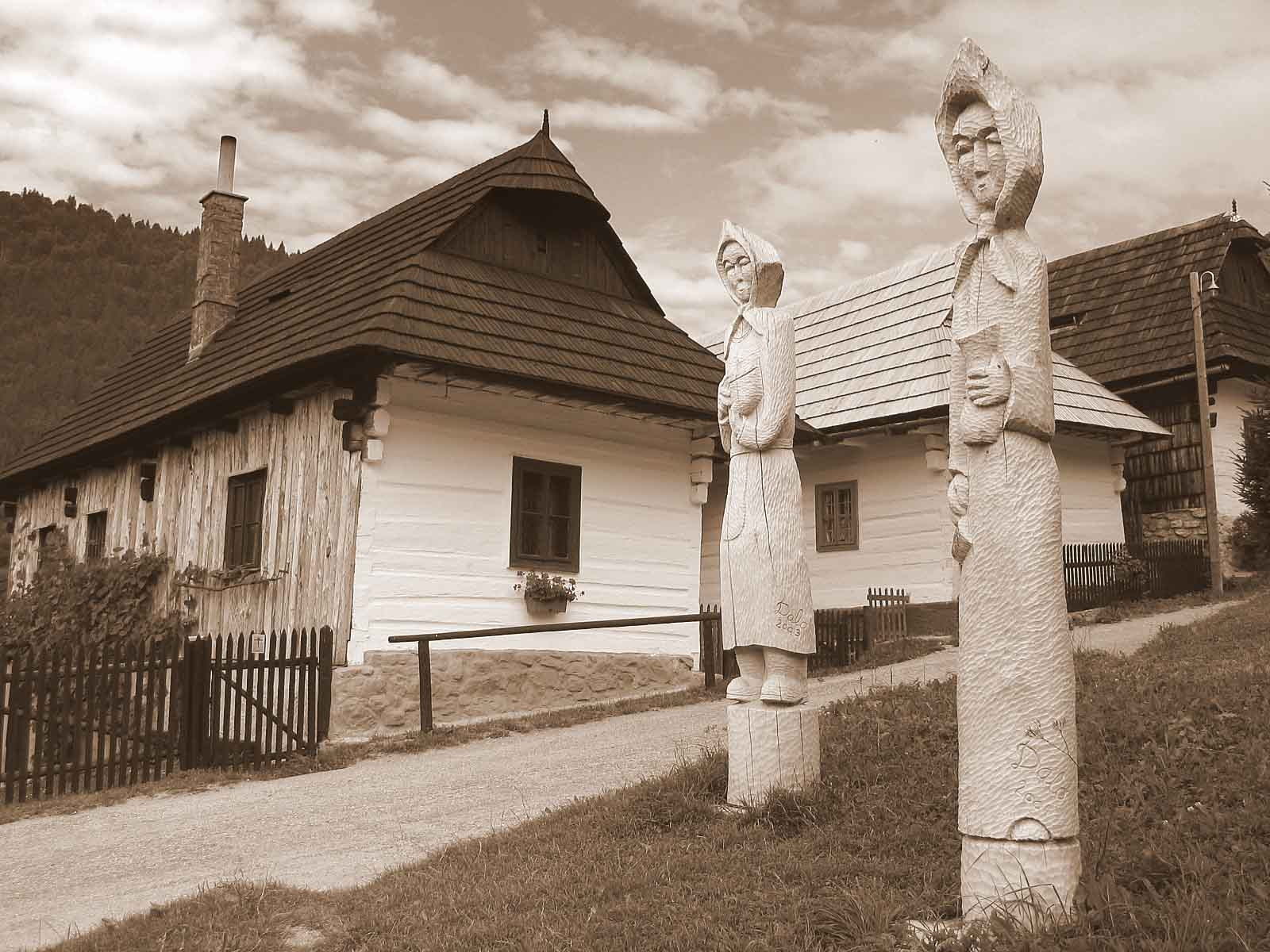
- Street in Vlkolínec

- Location within Slovakia
- Coordinates: 49°02′30″N 19°16′30″E
- Country: Slovakia
- Region: Žilina
- District: Ružomberok
- Municipality: Ružomberok

Area
  - Total: 7.97 km^{2} (3.08 sq mi)
- Elevation: 718 m (2,356 ft)

Population
  - Total: 13
  - Density: 1.6/km^{2} (4.2/sq mi)
- Website: www.vlkolinec.sk

UNESCO World Heritage Site
- Official name: Vlkolínec
- Criteria: iv, v
- Reference: 622
- Inscription: 1993 (17th Session)

Vlkolínec is a village under the administration of the town of Ružomberok in Slovakia. Historically, however, it was a separate village. The first written mention of the village came from 1376 and after 1882 it became part of Ružomberok. Its name is probably derived from the Slovak word "vlk", i.e. wolf.

Vlkolínec has been listed as a UNESCO World Heritage Site since 1993, and is one of ten Slovak villages that have been given the status of a folk architecture reservations. This status was granted because the village is an untouched and complex example of folk countryside architecture of the region of the Northern Carpathians.

Vlkolínec, situated in the centre of Slovakia, is a remarkably intact settlement with the traditional features of a Central European village. It is the region's most complete group of these kinds of traditional log houses, often found in mountainous areas. The village consists of more than 45 log houses each of them made up of two or three rooms. A wooden belfry from the 18th century as well as the baroque chapel have also been preserved. Houses No. 16 and 17 have been turned into a folk museum with all the instruments of daily life and work.

== See also ==
- Other historical reservations of folk architecture in Slovakia
  - Brhlovce
  - Čičmany
  - Osturňa
  - Plavecký Peter
  - Podbiel
  - Sebechleby
  - Špania Dolina
  - Veľké Leváre
  - Ždiar
- Other similar World Heritage Sites
  - Hollókő in Hungary
  - Holašovice in Czech Republic
  - Gammelstad Church Town in Sweden

== Gallery ==
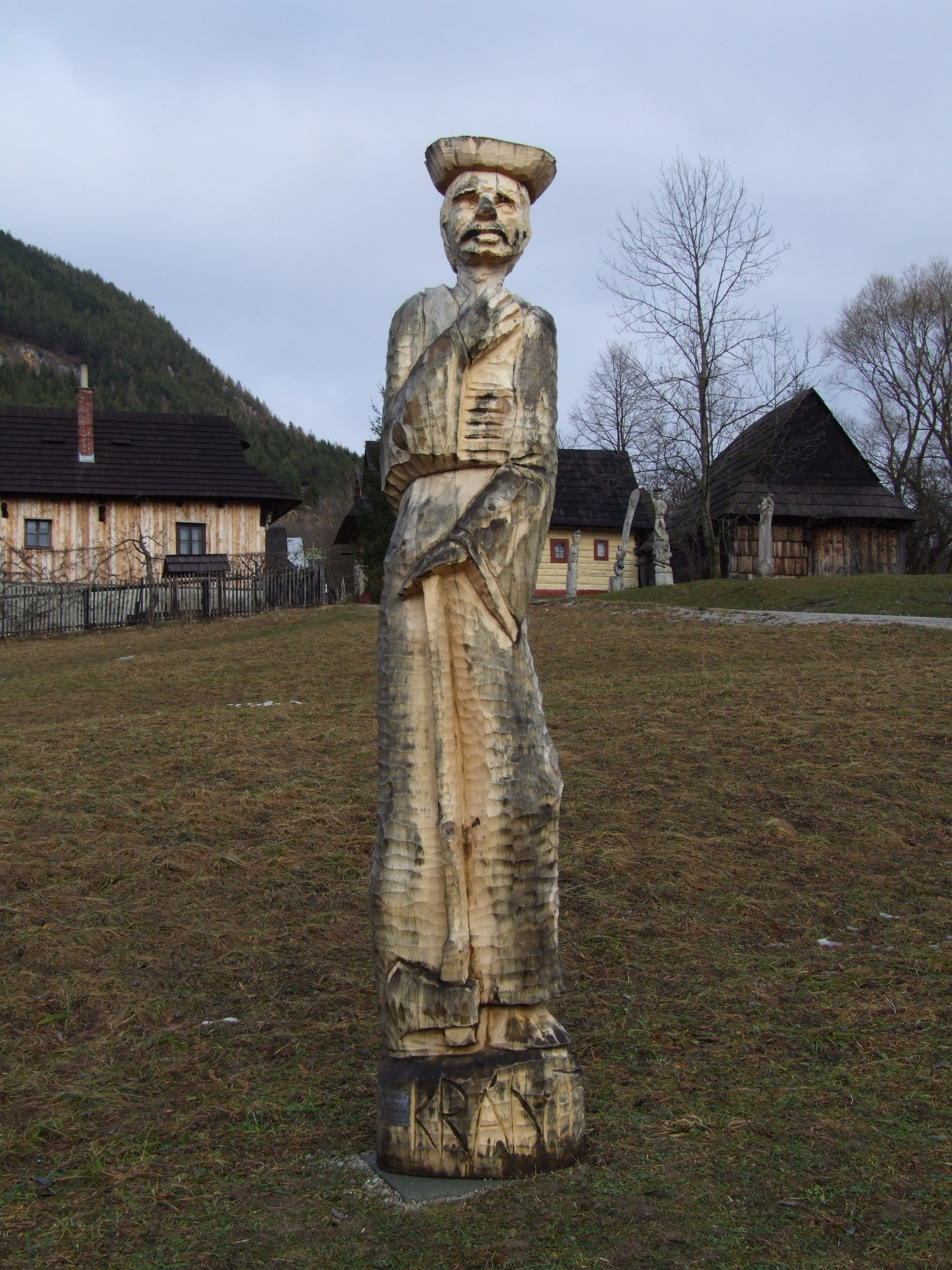
Wooden carved sculpture at the entrance to the village

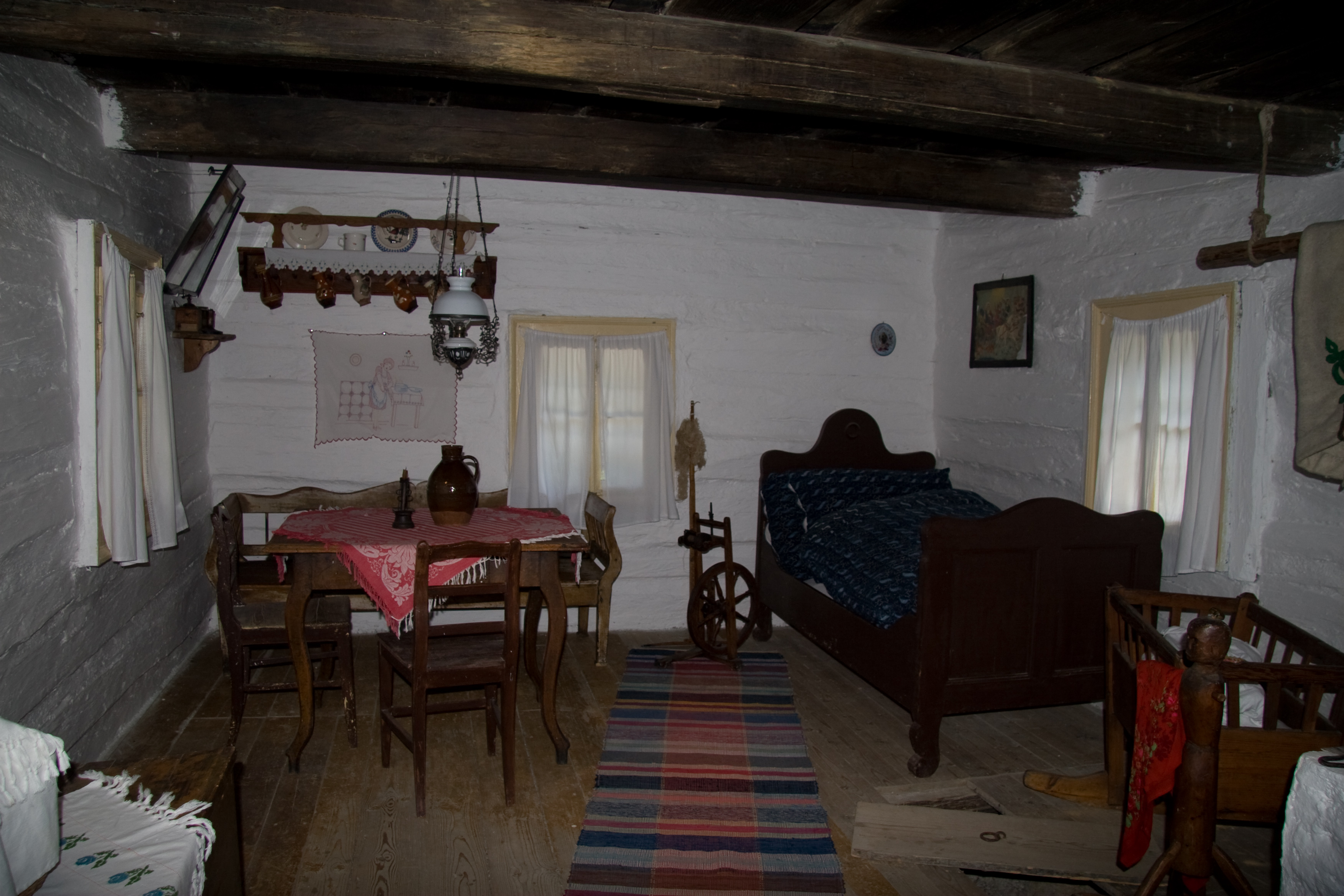
Typical interior of one of the houses

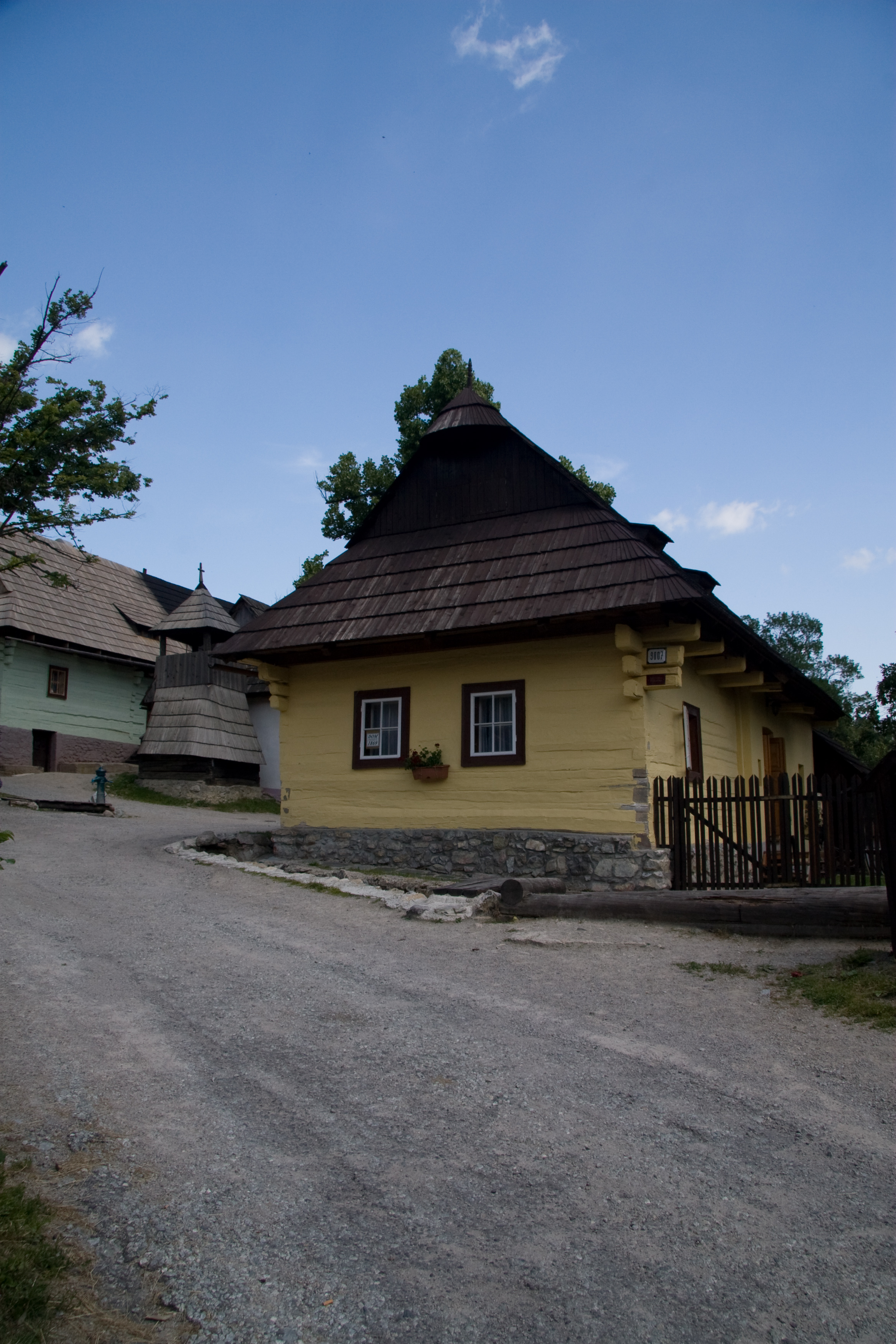
House in Vlkolínec

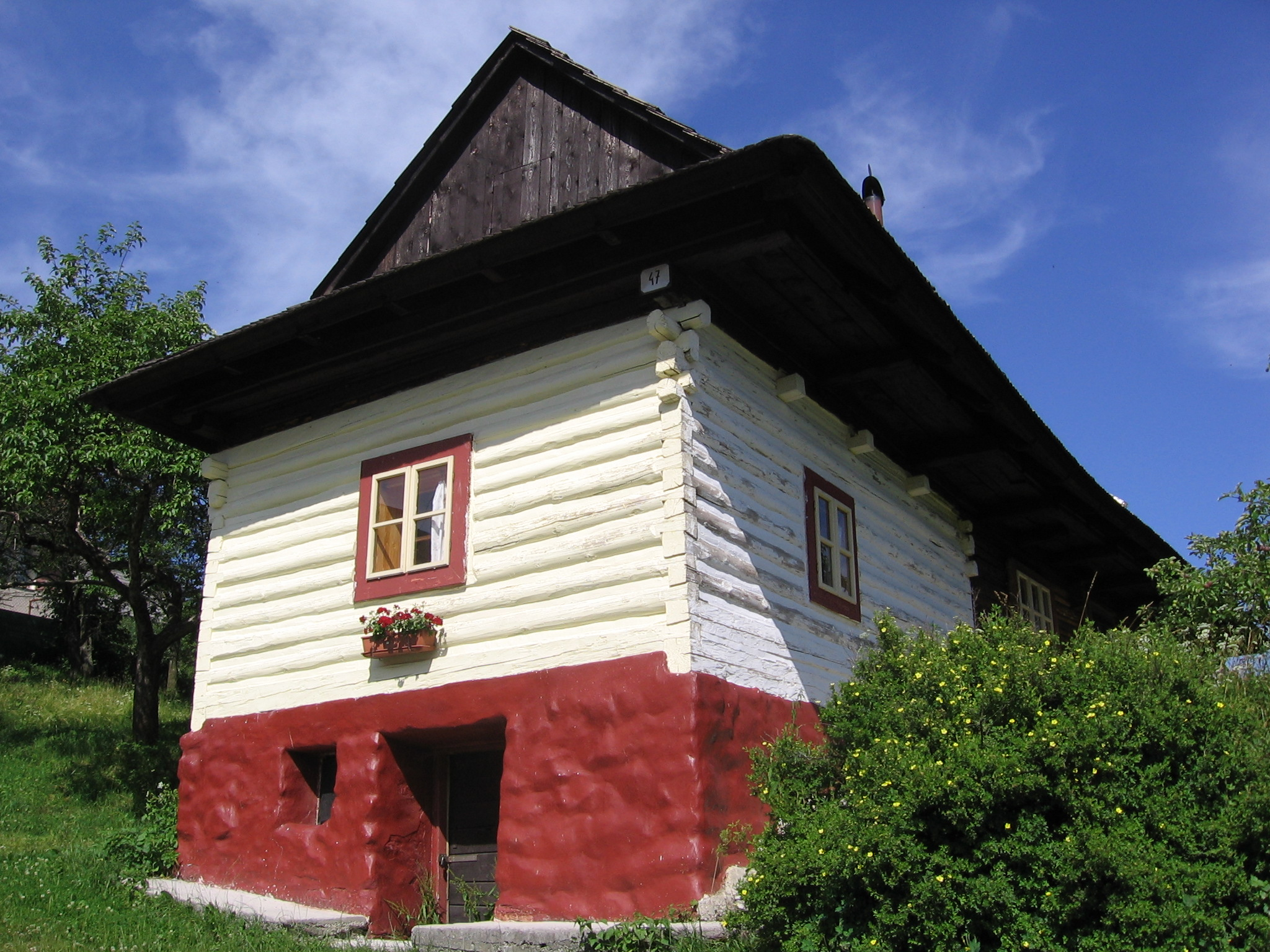
House No. 47 in Vlkolínec

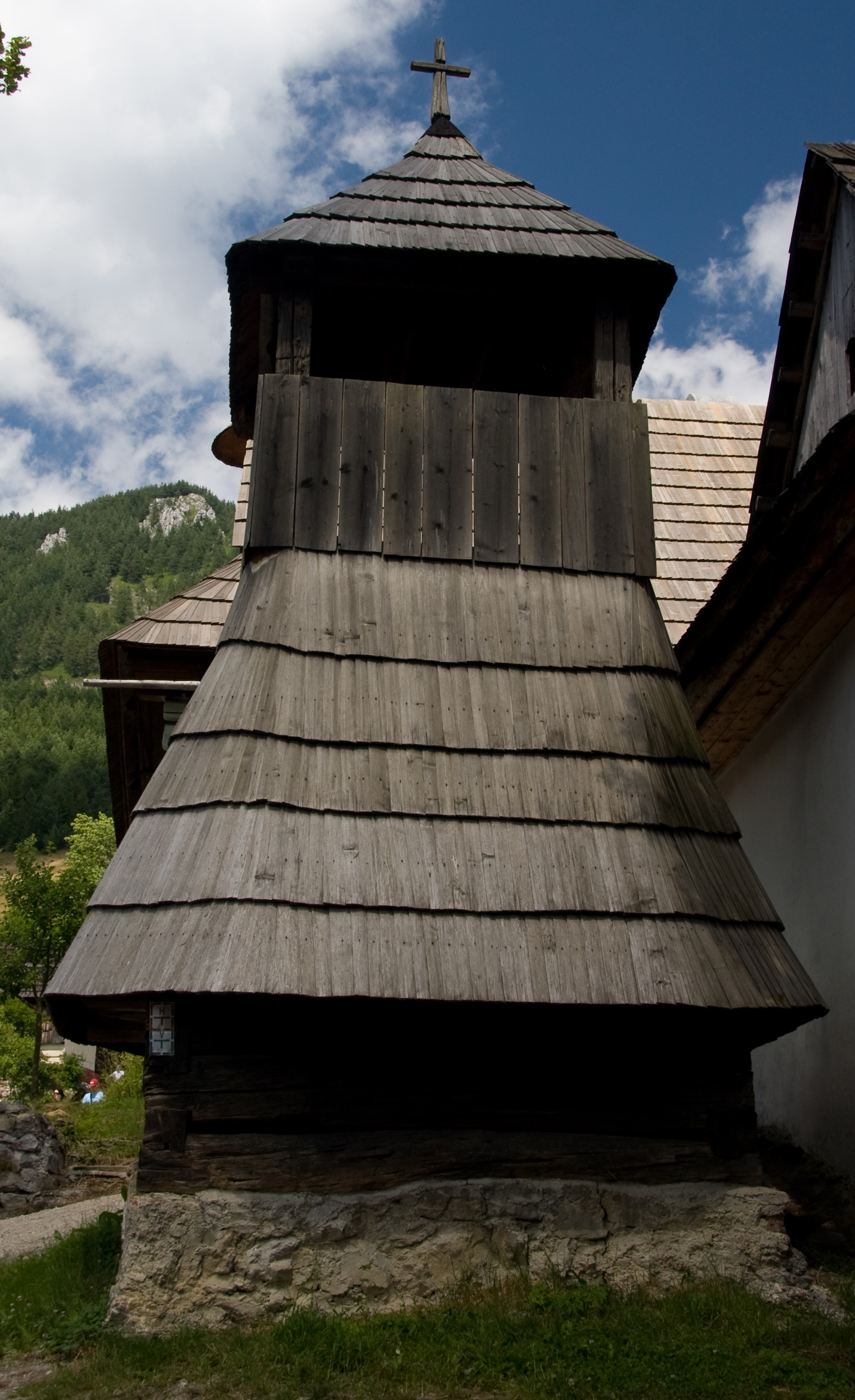
Belfry in Vlkolínec

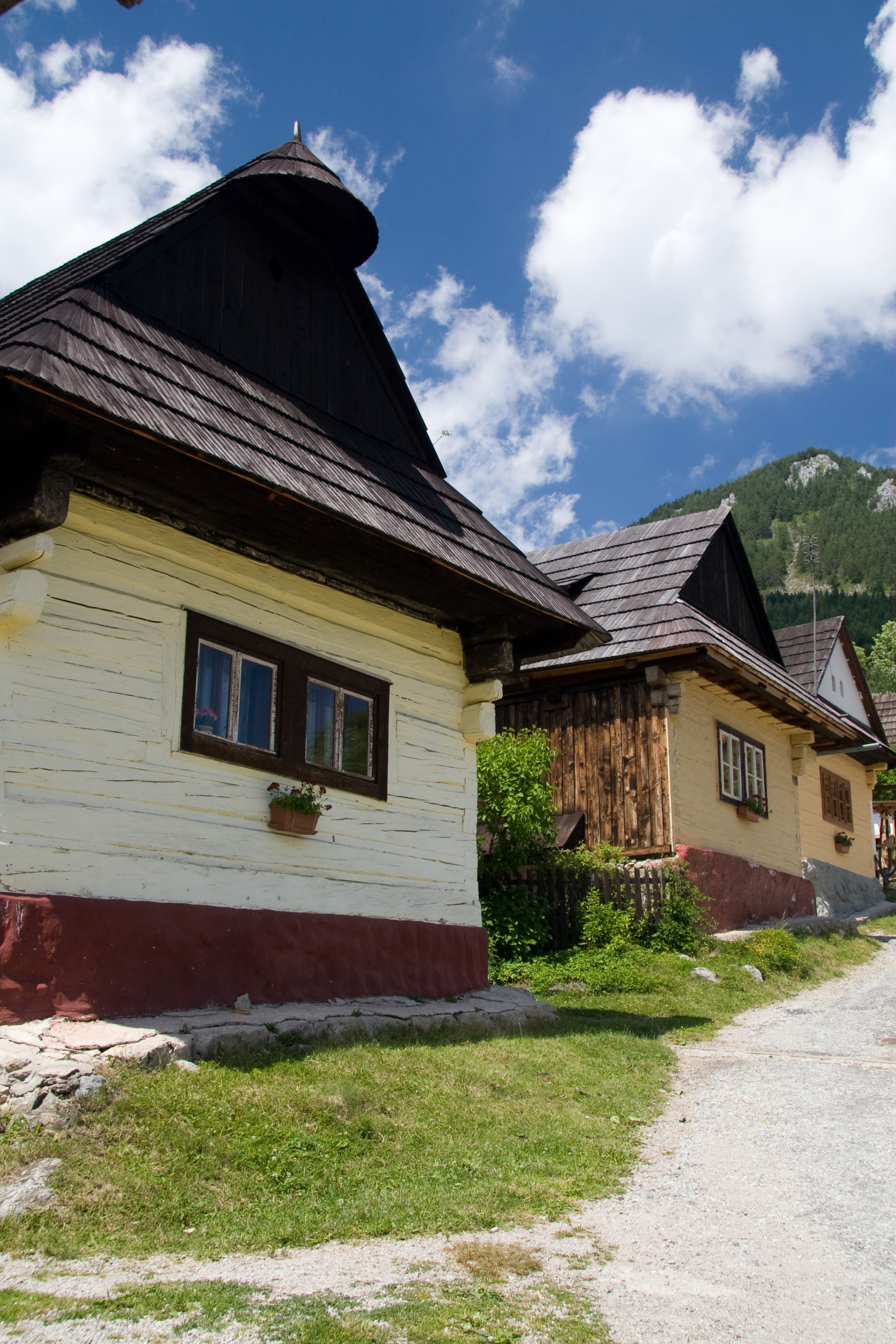
Street in Vlkolínec

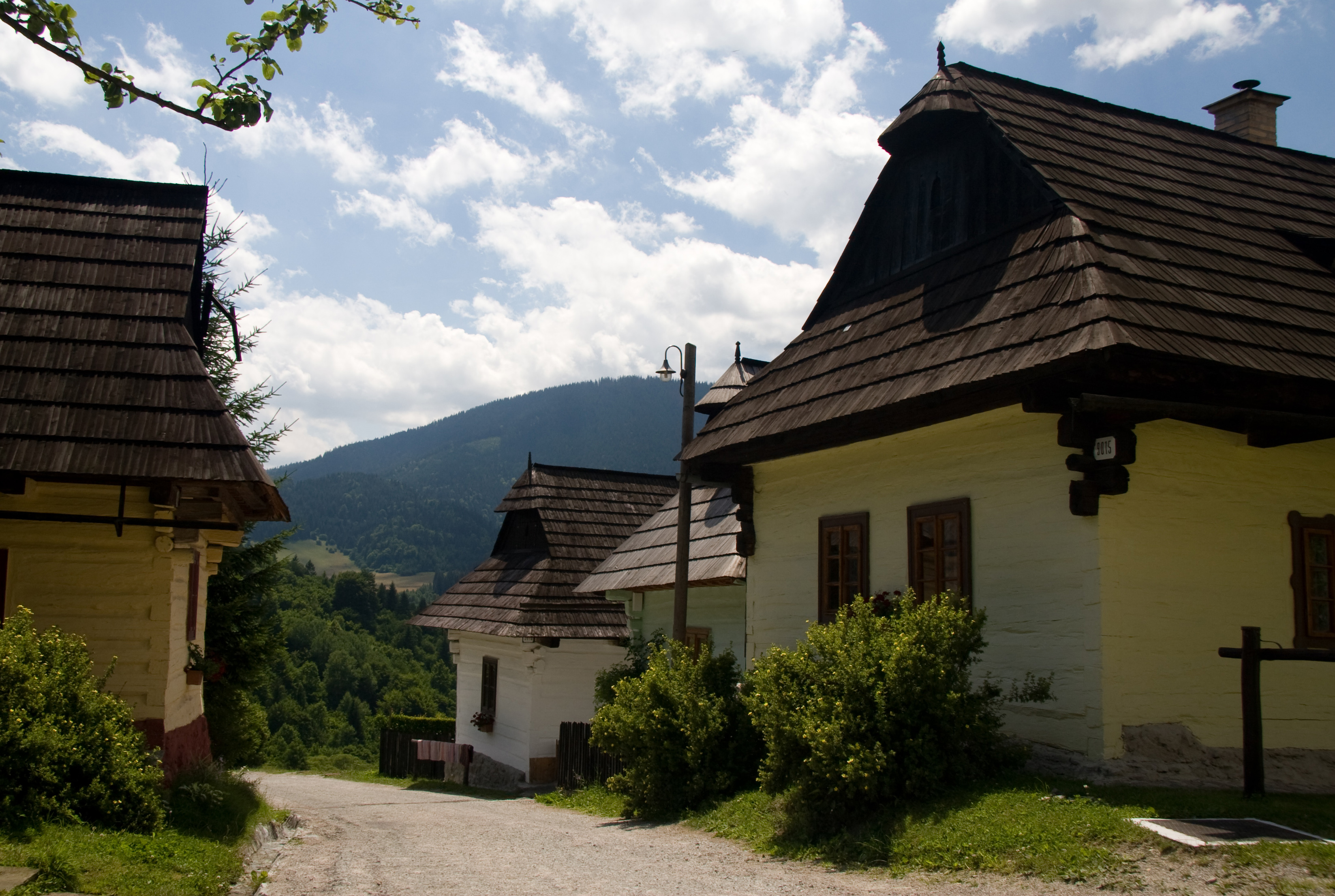
Street in Vlkolínec

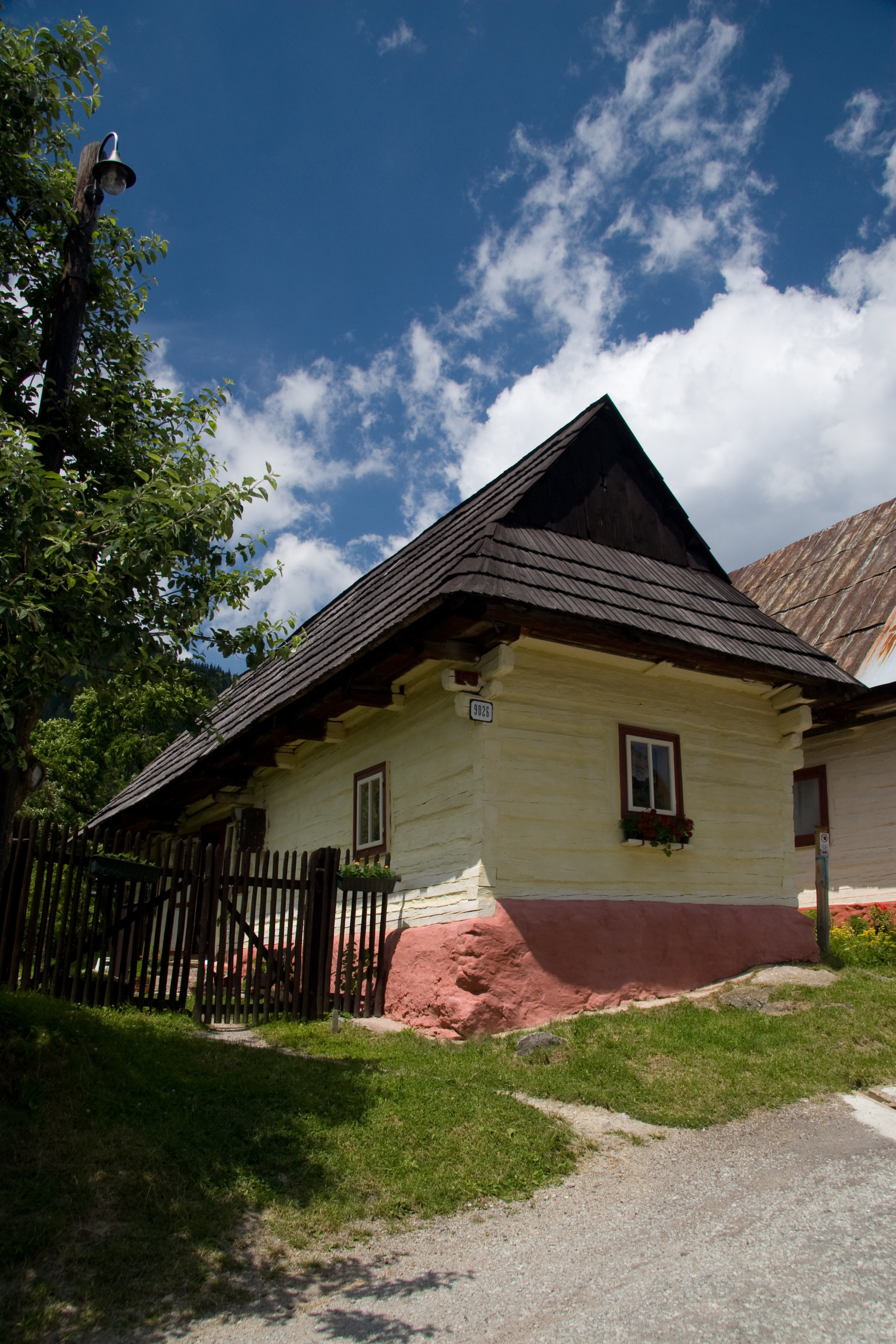
House in Vlkolínec

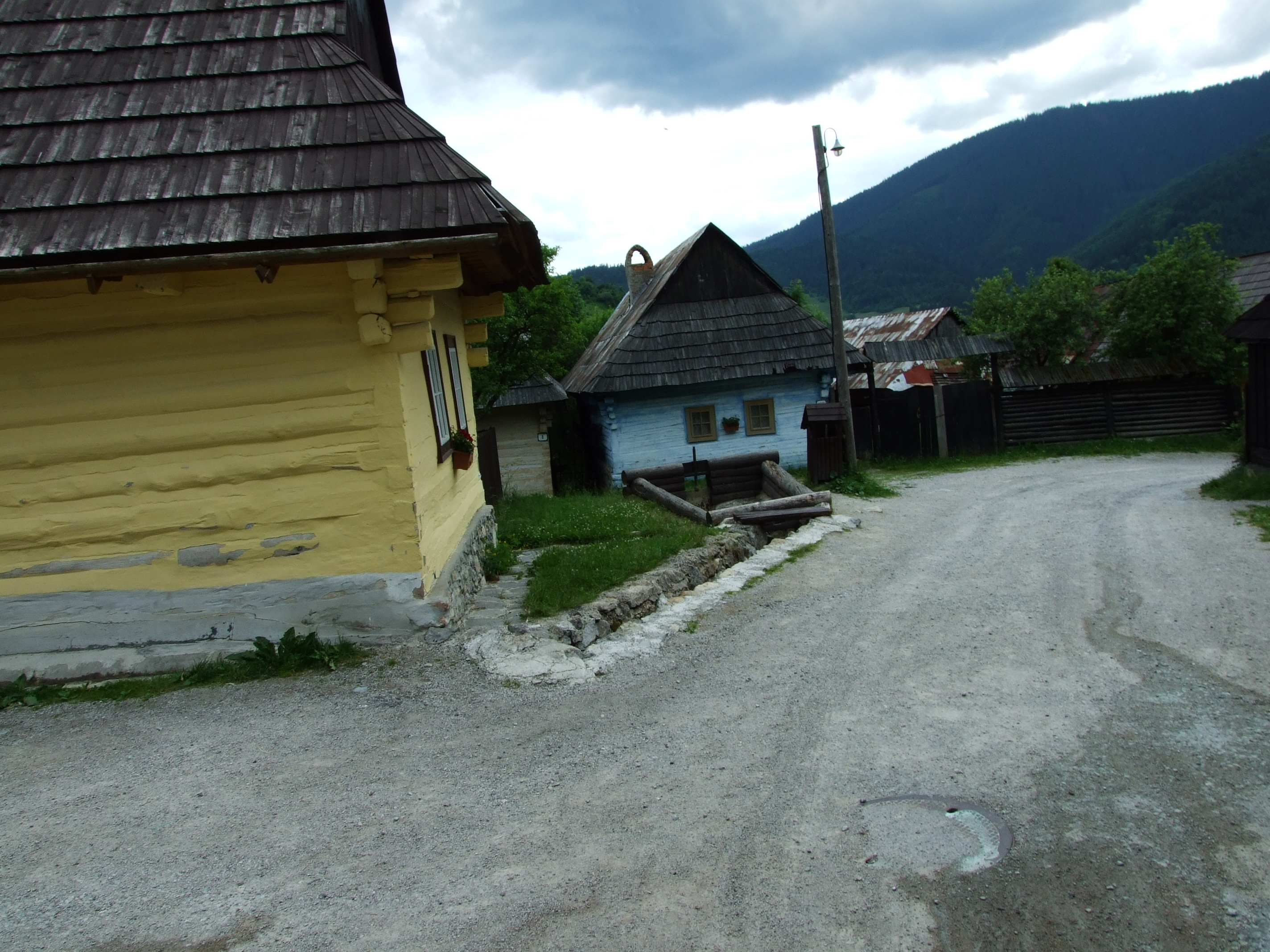
