= Evangelical Lyceum =

Coordinates: 48.1247592°N 17.0910425°E

- Evanjelické lýceum v Bratislave

Location
- Vranovská 2 Bratislava, 85102; Slovakia

Information
- School type: Faith school, Bilingual school
- Religious affiliation: Lutheran
- Established: 1606
- Status: open
- Closed: 1923
- Teaching staff: 63
- Employees: 74
- Age: 14 to 19
- Education system: Slovak
- Language: Slovak, English
- Website: http://evlyceum.sk/

The Evangelical Lutheran Lyceum (Evanjelické lyceum) in Bratislava, Slovakia, was founded in 1606 by David Kilger as a Lutheran high school. Until 1656 the Evangelical Lyceum was a school with eight classes, two of them elementary school. Among its students, from 1829 to 1836, was the young Ľudovít Štúr, who became a member of Czech-Slav Society at the school, an important influence on his life as a Slovak national ist. Another famous student was Janko Matúška, who wrote the song Nad Tatrou sa blýska, which would become the national anthem of Slovakia.

Between 1923 and 1989 the school was closed, but it was reopened in 1991 as a bilingual school, and continues to operate today.

== Sources ==
- Home page (in Slovak)
