= Culture of Central Europe =

Central Europe is a region of Europe. The culture may refer to:

- Culture of Switzerland
- Culture of Liechtenstein
- Culture of Germany
- Culture of Austria
- Culture of Poland
- Culture of the Czech Republic
- Culture of Slovakia
- Culture of Hungary
- Culture of Slovenia
- Culture of Croatia

== See also ==
- Culture of Europe
- Cultural policies of the European Union
