= Janko Matúška =

Slovak poet and playwright (1821–1877)

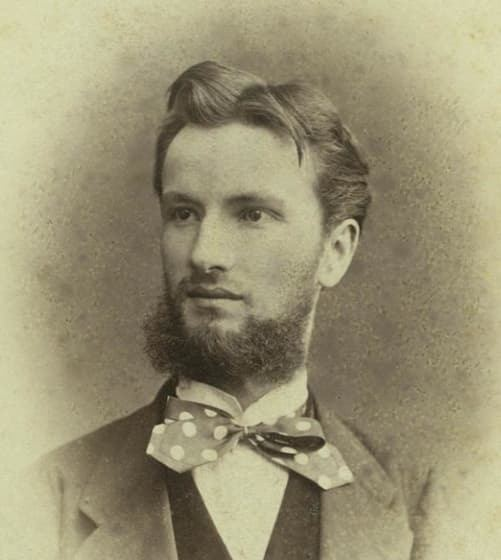
- Born: 10 January 1821; Dolný Kubín (Alsókubin), Kingdom of Hungary, Austrian Empire
- Died: 11 January 1877 (aged 56); Dolný Kubín (Alsókubin), Austria-Hungary
- Resting place: Dolný Kubín
- Education: Evangelic Lutheran Lyceum in Pressburg (modern-day Bratislava)
- Occupations: Clerk of the Court, Árva)
- Known for: author of the Slovak national anthem
- Spouse: Žofia née Veselovská
- Parent(s): Juraj Matúška; Zuzana Bencúrová

Janko Matúška (/ˈjæŋkoʊ məˈtuːʃkə/; 10 January 1821 – 11 January 1877) was a Slovak poet, activist, occasional playwright, and clerk of the court in the Kingdom of Hungary. He is best known as the author of the Slovak national anthem, "Lightning O'er the Tatras", based on the melody of the Slovak folk song "She Was Digging a Spring".

== Life ==
Janko Matúška was born into a craftsman's family in Dolný Kubín, then part of the Kingdom of Hungary. He began to attend school there, then probably at the Gymnázium of Gemer (Sajógömör) and finally he studied at the prestigious Lutheran Lyceum of Pressburg (preparatory high school and college) where he took courses in the Institute of Czechoslovak Language and Literature while majoring in theology. Ľudovít Štúr, the only professor teaching courses offered by the institute at that time, was fired in December 1843 under pressure from the kingdom's authorities, who objected to his pro-Slovak activism. 23-year-old Janko Matúška wrote "Lightning over the Tatras" when he and other students were agitated about the subsequent repeated denials of their appeals to the school board to reverse Štúr's dismissal. About two dozen students, including Matúška, decided to leave the lýceum in protest in March 1844. Matúška went to take his final exams at the Lutheran gymnázium in Tisovec (Tiszolc). He lived in Orava (Árva) for most of his adult life, and stopped writing after the Hungarian Revolution of 1848. He worked in government offices after 1850, and was Clerk of the County Court in Dolný Kubín from 1870 to 1875. He died the day after his 56th birthday and was buried in Dolný Kubín.

== Works ==
He started writing at the lyceum. He focused on poetry, especially ballads and fables. He also wrote some prose and drama and translated from Polish, for instance Dziady by Adam Mickiewicz.

=== Poetry ===
- 1844 - Nad Tatrou sa blýska
- Púchovská skala
- Svätý zákon
- Hrdoš
- Sokolíček plavý
- Preletel sokolík nad tichým Dunajom
- Slepý starec
- Po dolinách
- Vzdychy spod Lysice
- Kozia skala

=== Prose ===
- Zhoda liptovská (novella)

=== Selections and collections ===
- 1921 - Janka Matúšku Zobrané spisy básnické
- 1971 - Piesne a báje, selection from poetry, prose and drama

=== Drama ===
- 1846 - Siroty
