= Gemer (village) =

Village and municipality in Slovakia

Gemer Sajógömör
- Municipality
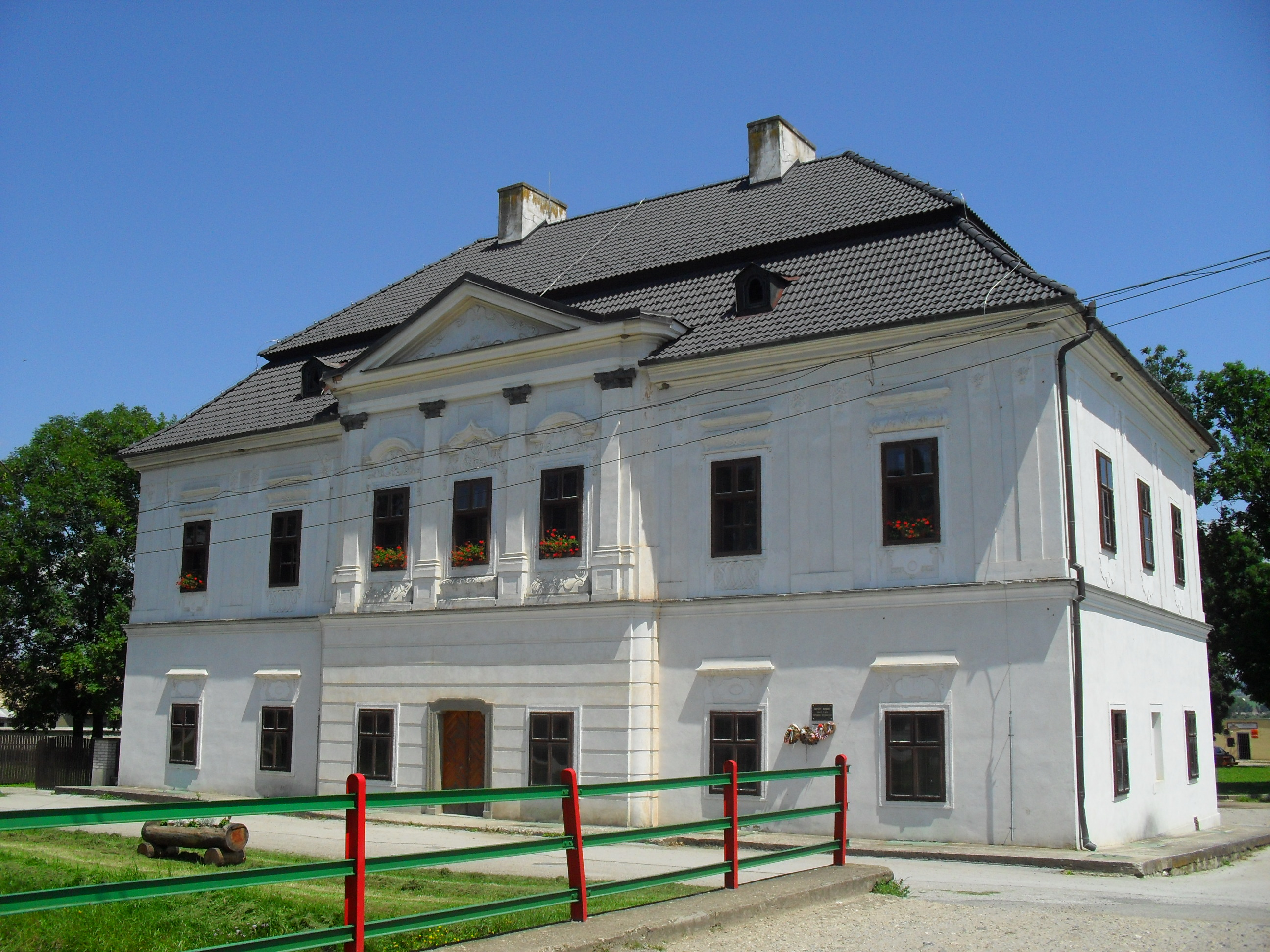
- Baroque manor

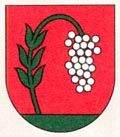
- Flag Coat of arms

- Location of Gemer in the Banská Bystrica Region Location of Gemer in Slovakia
- Coordinates: 48°27′N 20°19′E
- Country: Slovakia
- Region: Banská Bystrica Region
- District: Revúca District
- First mentioned: 1198

Area
  - Total: 17.97 km^{2} (6.94 sq mi)
- Elevation: 181 m (594 ft)

Population (2025)
  - Total: 877
- Time zone: UTC+1 (CET)
  - Summer (DST): UTC+2 (CEST)
- Postal code: 982 61
- Area code: +421 47
- Vehicle registration plate (until 2022): RA
- Website: www.obecgemer.sk

Gemer (German: (rare) Gömer, Gemer; Hungarian: Sajógömör) is a village and municipality in Revúca District in the Banská Bystrica Region of Slovakia.

== Etymology ==
János Melich associated Gemer with the Kyrgyz personal name Kemirbaj and old Turkish place name Kömürtag. This theory was adopted also by Lájos Kiss who explains the name from old Turkic kömür: coal. However, Šimon Ondruš deemed the toponym is of slavic origin, a cognate of Slovak homoľa, ultimately from Proto Slavic stem(*gom-ol-), which originally meant a lump and afterwards metaphorically a hill.

== Geography ==
The municipality lies at an altitude of 181 metres (594 ft) and covers an area of 17.97 km^{2} (6.94 sq mi) (2025).

== History ==
Important Bronze Age finds have been made in the village. In historical records, the village was first mentioned in 1198 as Gomur (1216 Gumur, 1289 Gemer) as a settlement below the much older Gemer Castle (which was originally a Slavic fortified settlement). The castle was the capital of Gemer and control point of all the ways for Spiš County.

The settlement below the castle was a royal dominion and in the 14th century it became the capital of Gemer. It was besieged by the Bohemian condottiere Jiskra in the 15th century and it was pillaged by Turks in the 16th century. From 1938 to 1945 it belonged to Hungary under the First Vienna Award.

== Population ==
Population statistic (10 years)
Year	1995	2005	2015	2025
Count	826	797	895	877
Difference		−3.51%	+12.29%	−2.01%

Population statistic
Year	2024	2025
Count	889	877
Difference		−1.34%

It has a population of 877 people (31 December 2025).

=== Ethnicity ===
Census 2021 (1+ %)
Ethnicity	Number	Fraction
Hungarian	720	80.08%
Slovak	191	21.24%
Romani	119	13.23%
Not found out	16	1.77%
Total	899	

In year 2021 was 899 people by ethnicity 720 as Hungarian, 191 as Slovak, 119 as Romani, 16 as Not found out, 3 as Other and 2 as Czech.

Note on population: The difference values of population numbers in the table "Population statistic" and in the sections "Ethnicity" & "Religion" is caused by the use of various statistical methods.

=== Religion ===
Census 2021 (1+ %)
Religion	Number	Fraction
Evangelical Church	325	36.15%
None	279	31.03%
Roman Catholic Church	206	22.91%
Calvinist Church	54	6.01%
United Methodist Church	13	1.45%
Total	899	

In year 2021 was 899 people by religion 325 from Evangelical Church, 279 from None, 206 from Roman Catholic Church, 54 from Calvinist Church, 13 from United Methodist Church, 7 from Greek Catholic Church, 6 from Jehovah's Witnesses, 5 from Not found out, 2 from Eastern Orthodox Church, 1 from Other and 1 from Buddhism.

== People ==
- Czinka Panna

=== Other residents ===
- Samo Chalupka
- István Gyöngyösi
- Ján Kalinčiak
- Janko Kráľ
- Janko Matúška
- Francis II Rákóczi
- Sándor Rudnay
- Sándor Petőfi
- Pavel Jozef Šafárik
- Jonáš Záborský

== Genealogical resources ==
The records for genealogical research are available at the state archive "Statny Archiv in Banska Bystrica, Slovakia"

- Roman Catholic church records (births/marriages/deaths): 1733-1896 (parish B)
- Lutheran church records (births/marriages/deaths): 1730-1895 (parish A)
- Reformated church records (births/marriages/deaths): 1707-1870 (parish B)

== See also ==
- List of municipalities and towns in Slovakia
