= Proglas =

Old Church Slavonic poem

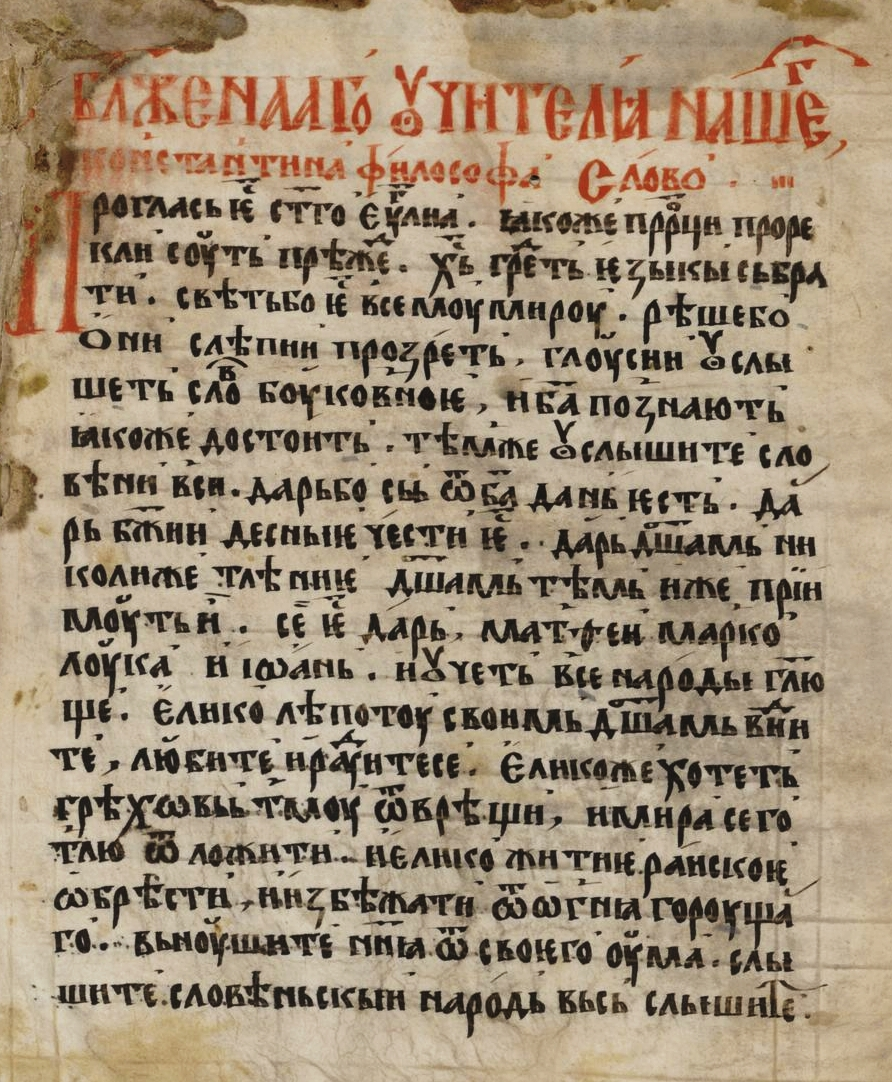
- Author: Saint Cyril
- Original title: ⰒⰓⰑⰃⰎⰀⰔⰟ
- Language: Church Slavonic
- Publication place: Prague, Great Moravia

Proglas (Old Church Slavonic Glagolitic: ⰒⰓⰑⰃⰎⰀⰔⰟ, Cyrillic: Прогласъ, lit. 'Foreword') is the foreword to the Old Church Slavonic translation of the four Gospels. Made between 863 and 867 by Saint Cyril and published in Prague, Proglas is considered to be the first poem in literary Old Church Slavonic.

== See also ==
- Wikisource has the complete text of Proglas (in modern transliteration)
- Wikisource has the complete text of Proglas (in Cyrillic)
- Wikisource has the complete text of Proglas (in Glagolitics)
