= Ždiar =

- Municipality
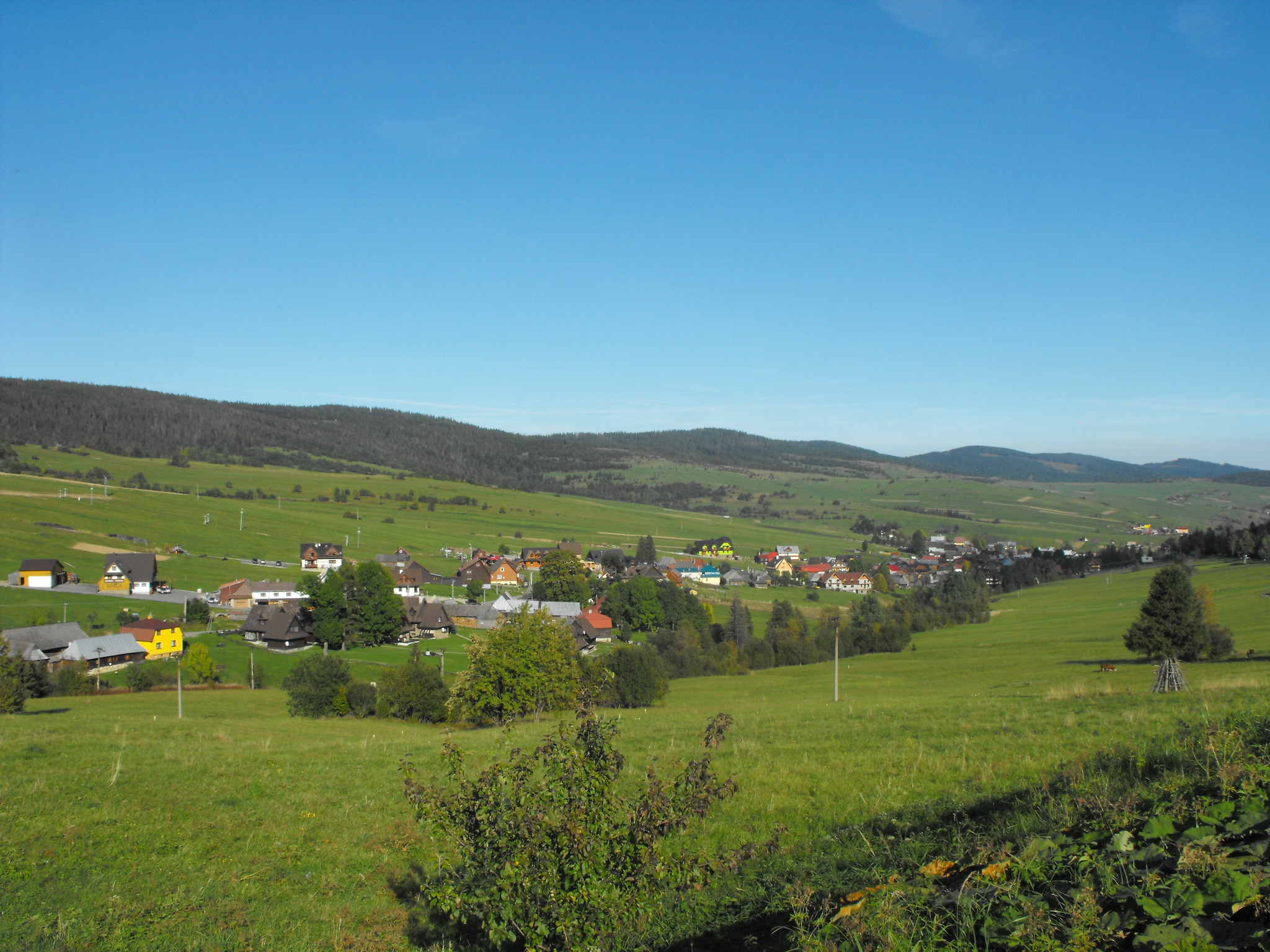

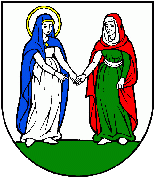
- Flag Coat of arms

- Location of Ždiar in the Prešov Region Location of Ždiar in Slovakia
- Coordinates: 49.27°N 20.27°E
- Country: Slovakia
- Region: Prešov Region
- District: Poprad District
- First mentioned: 1409

Area
  - Total: 27.32 km^{2} (10.55 sq mi)
- Elevation: 895 m (2,936 ft)

Population (2025)
  - Total: 1,355
- Time zone: UTC+1 (CET)
  - Summer (DST): UTC+2 (CEST)
- Postal code: 595 5
- Area code: +421 52
- Vehicle registration plate (until 2022): PP
- Website: zdiar.sk

Ždiar (Hungarian: Zár, German: Morgenröthe, Goral: Zor) is a village and municipality in the Poprad District in the Prešov Region in Spiš in northern Slovakia.

== History ==
In historical records the village was first mentioned in 1409. Its first name had been Stragan. Locals had been engaged in agriculture, pasturage and charcoal production. From the end of 19th century they began to be employed in tourism. It is a historically Goral village.

== Geography ==
The municipality lies at an altitude of 895 metres (2,936 ft) and covers an area of 27.32 km^{2} (10.55 sq mi) (2025).

The village is located about 3 km from the Polish border crossing and 34 km from Poprad.

== Population ==
Population statistic (10 years)
Year	1995	2005	2015	2025
Count	1305	1338	1370	1355
Difference		+2.52%	+2.39%	−1.09%

Population statistic
Year	2024	2025
Count	1357	1355
Difference		−0.14%

It has a population of 1355 people (31 December 2025).

=== Ethnicity ===
Census 2021 (1+ %)
Ethnicity	Number	Fraction
Slovak	1338	97.37%
Not found out	119	8.66%
Polish	19	1.38%
Total	1374	

In year 2021 was 1374 people by ethnicity 1338 as Slovak, 119 as Not found out, 19 as Polish, 12 as Czech, 6 as Other, 4 as Rusyn, 3 as German, 2 as Moravian, 2 as English, 1 as Russian, 1 as Austrian and 1 as Croatian.

Note on population: The difference values of population numbers in the table "Population statistic" and in the sections "Ethnicity" & "Religion" is caused by the use of various statistical methods.

=== Religion ===
Census 2021 (1+ %)
Religion	Number	Fraction
Roman Catholic Church	1208	87.92%
None	98	7.13%
Not found out	21	1.53%
Evangelical Church	16	1.16%
Total	1374	

In year 2021 was 1374 people by religion 1208 from Roman Catholic Church, 98 from None, 21 from Not found out, 16 from Evangelical Church, 11 from Greek Catholic Church, 6 from Other, 5 from Ad hoc movements, 2 from Jewish community, 2 from Christian Congregations in Slovakia, 2 from Baptists Church, 1 from Eastern Orthodox Church, 1 from Other and not ascertained christian church and 1 from Apostolic Church.

== Recreation ==
Ždiar is located at the base of Strednica alpine and cross country Ski resort. Several hiking trails into the High Tatras begin in the village.
