= Podbiel =

- Municipality
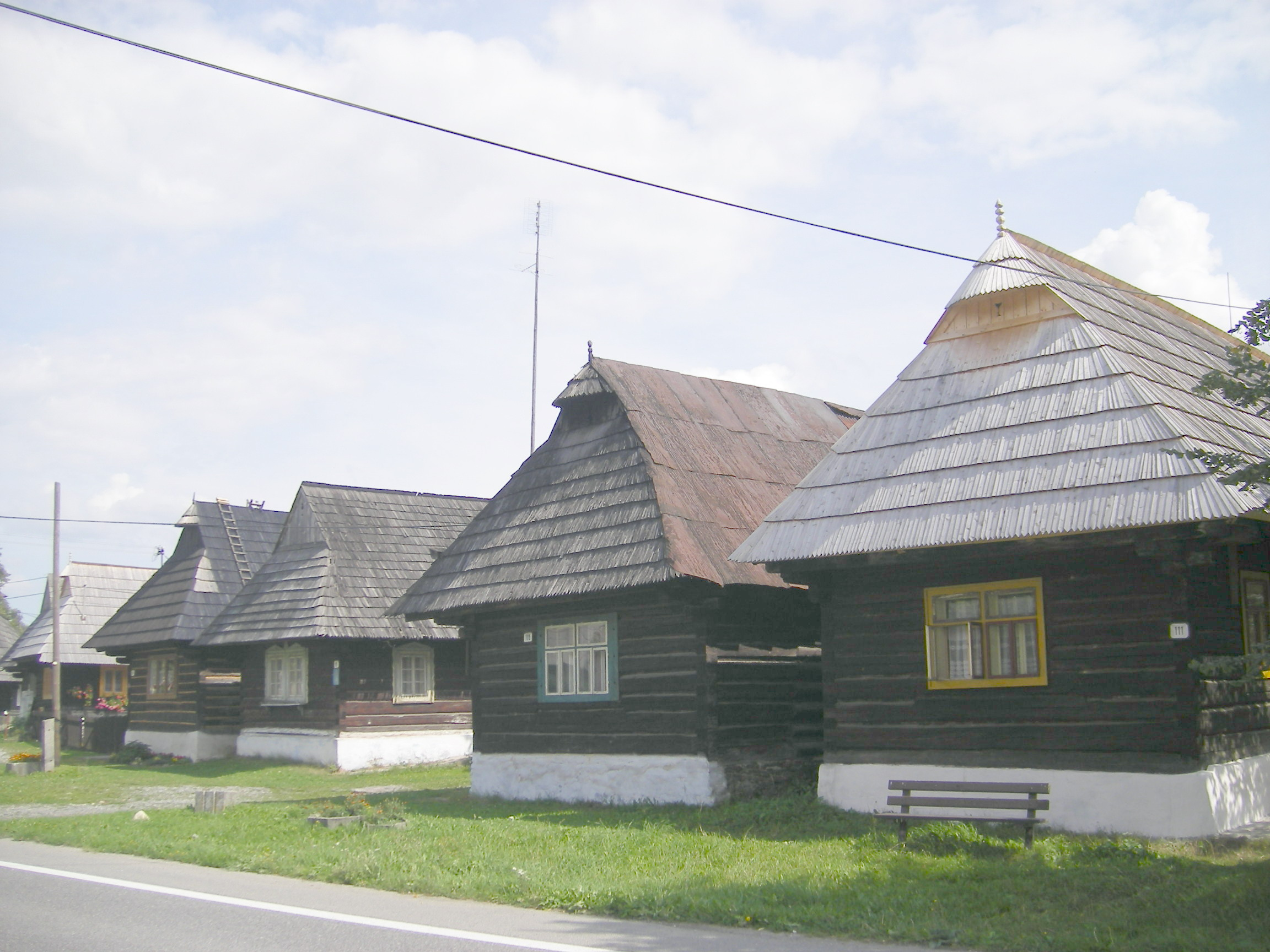

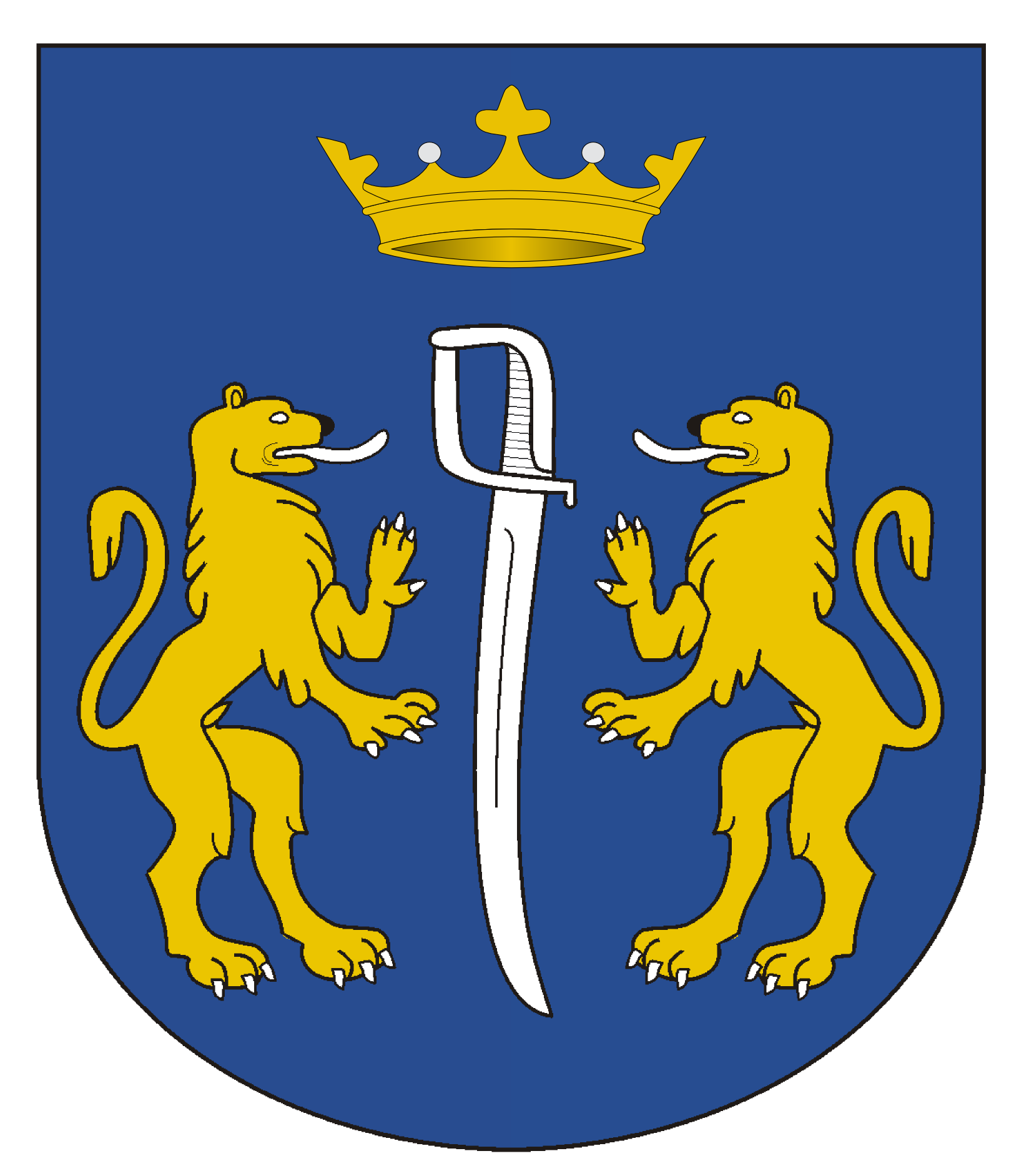
- Flag Coat of arms

- Location of Podbiel in the Žilina Region Location of Podbiel in Slovakia
- Coordinates: 49.32°N 19.48°E
- Country: Slovakia
- Region: Žilina Region
- District: Tvrdošín District
- First mentioned: 1564

Area
  - Total: 19.29 km^{2} (7.45 sq mi)
- Elevation: 559 m (1,834 ft)

Population (2025)
  - Total: 1,338
- Time zone: UTC+1 (CET)
  - Summer (DST): UTC+2 (CEST)
- Postal code: 274 2
- Area code: +421 43
- Vehicle registration plate (until 2022): TS
- Website: www.podbiel.sk

Podbiel (Hungarian: Podbjel) is a village and municipality in Tvrdošín District in the Žilina Region of northern Slovakia. It contains a beautiful set of traditional wooden cottages, which have been declared a folk architecture preservation area.

== History ==
In historical records, the village was first mentioned in 1564.

== Geography ==
The municipality lies at an altitude of 559 metres (1,834 ft) and covers an area of 19.29 km^{2} (7.45 sq mi) (2025).

== Population ==
Population statistic (10 years)
Year	1995	2005	2015	2025
Count	1185	1270	1283	1338
Difference		+7.17%	+1.02%	+4.28%

Population statistic
Year	2024	2025
Count	1338	1338
Difference		+0%

It has a population of 1338 people (31 December 2025).

=== Ethnicity ===
Census 2021 (1+ %)
Ethnicity	Number	Fraction
Slovak	1260	96.62%
Not found out	50	3.83%
Total	1304	

In year 2021 was 1304 people by ethnicity 1260 as Slovak, 50 as Not found out, 6 as Czech, 3 as Other, 1 as Russian and 1 as Canadian.

Note on population: The difference values of population numbers in the table "Population statistic" and in the sections "Ethnicity" & "Religion" is caused by the use of various statistical methods.

=== Religion ===
Census 2021 (1+ %)
Religion	Number	Fraction
Roman Catholic Church	1119	85.81%
None	109	8.36%
Not found out	48	3.68%
Total	1304	

In year 2021 was 1304 people by religion 1119 from Roman Catholic Church, 109 from None, 48 from Not found out, 8 from Greek Catholic Church, 6 from Evangelical Church, 5 from Ad hoc movements, 3 from Jehovah's Witnesses, 2 from Other, 1 from Calvinist Church, 1 from Paganism and natural spirituality, 1 from Other and not ascertained christian church and 1 from Islam.
