= Sebechleby =

Sebechleby Szebelléb
- Municipality
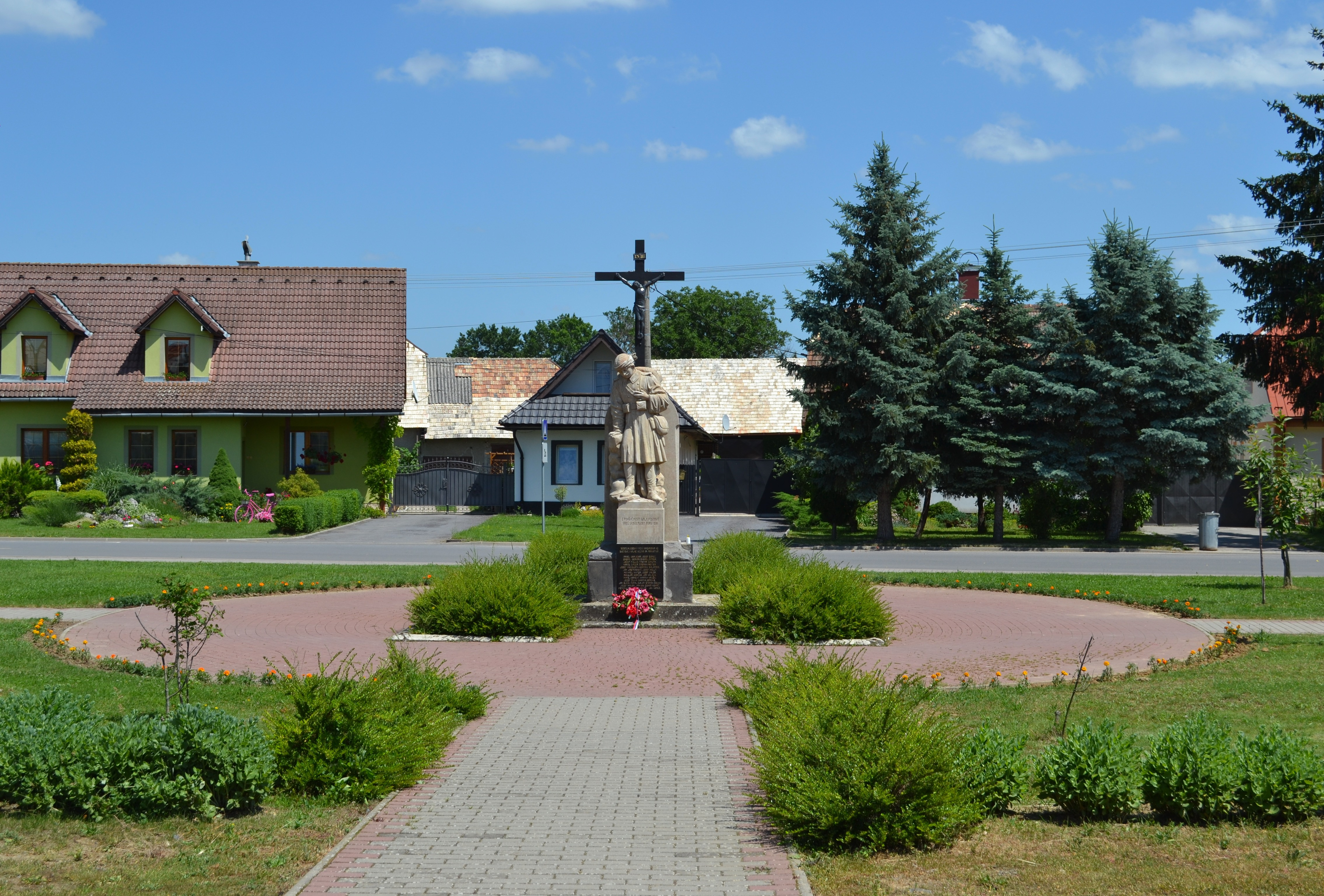

- Flag

- Location of Sebechleby in the Banská Bystrica Region Location of Sebechleby in Slovakia
- Coordinates: 48.29°N 18.94°E
- Country: Slovakia
- Region: Banská Bystrica Region
- District: Krupina District
- First mentioned: 1135

Area
  - Total: 30.42 km^{2} (11.75 sq mi)
- Elevation: 231 m (758 ft)

Population (2025)
  - Total: 1,169
- Time zone: UTC+1 (CET)
  - Summer (DST): UTC+2 (CEST)
- Postal code: 962 66
- Area code: +421 45
- Vehicle registration plate (until 2022): KA
- Website: sebechleby.com

Sebechleby (Hungarian: Szebelléb) is a village and municipality in the Krupina District of the Banská Bystrica Region of Slovakia.

== Geography ==
The municipality lies at an altitude of 231 metres (758 ft) and covers an area of 30.42 km^{2} (11.75 sq mi) (2025).

== Population ==
Population statistic (10 years)
Year	1995	2005	2015	2025
Count	1167	1218	1209	1169
Difference		+4.37%	−0.73%	−3.30%

Population statistic
Year	2024	2025
Count	1173	1169
Difference		−0.34%

It has a population of 1169 people (31 December 2025).

=== Ethnicity ===
Census 2021 (1+%)
Ethnicity	Number	Fraction
Slovak	1154	98.21%
Not found out	15	1.27%
Total	1175	

In year 2021 was 1175 people by ethnicity 1154 as Slovak, 15 as Not found out, 8 as Italian, 3 as Czech, 2 as Russian, 2 as Canadian, 1 as Romani, 1 as Rusyn, 1 as Romanian, 1 as Austrian, 1 as Hungarian, 1 as Other and 1 as English.

Note on population: The difference values of population numbers in the table "Population statistic" and in the sections "Ethnicity" & "Religion" is caused by the use of various statistical methods.

=== Religion ===
Census 2021 (1+%)
Religion	Number	Fraction
Roman Catholic Church	1013	86.21%
None	98	8.34%
Not found out	25	2.13%
Evangelical Church	20	1.7%
Total	1175	

In year 2021 was 1175 people by religion 1013 from Roman Catholic Church, 98 from None, 25 from Not found out, 20 from Evangelical Church, 6 from Other, 3 from Eastern Orthodox Church, 3 from Greek Catholic Church, 2 from Buddhism, 2 from Ad hoc movements, 1 from Paganism and natural spirituality, 1 from Other and not ascertained christian church and 1 from Hinduism.

== Stará Hora ==
A vineyard house in Stará Hora (2019)

Stará Hora is a part of Sebechleby at the foot of the Štiavnica Mountains. It consists of wine cellars dug into soft tuff, with vineyard houses built above them. According to local tradition, the cellars were made in the 16th and 17th centuries, when villagers hid from Ottoman raids by digging holes into the rock. Of about 130 vineyard buildings, 87 are listed as national cultural monuments. Stará Hora was declared a heritage reserve of folk architecture in 1981. Its Baroque chapel of Saint Urban was built in 1732.
