= Kopala studienku =

Slovak folk song

Song
- English title: She Was Diggin' Up a Spring

"Kopala studienku" (Slovak pronunciation: [ˈkɔ.pa.la ˈstu.ɟɪ̯eŋ.ku]; /koʊˈpɑː.lə stʊ.diˈɛŋ.ku/ koh-PAH-lə stuu-dee-ENG-koo; translated as "She Was Diggin' Up a Spring") is a Slovak folk song whose melody has served as the basis for Slovakia's national anthem "Nad Tatrou sa blýska".

== Lyrics ==
Slovak original

Kopala studienku, pozerala do nej,
či je tak hlboká, ako je široká,
skočila by do nej, ej, skočila by do nej.

A na tej studienke napájala páva,
povedzže mi, milá, holubienka sivá,
kohože si panna, ej, kohože si panna?

A ja ti nepoviem, lebo sama neviem,
prídi na večer k nám, mamky sa opýtam,
potom ti ja poviem, ej, potom ti ja poviem.

English translation

She was diggin' up a spring, she was lookin' into it,
whether it's as deep, as it is wide,
she'd jump into it, oh, she'd jump into it.

And from that well she let a peacock drink,
tell me, dear gray dove,
whose maiden am I, oh, whose maiden am I?

Ask me not, 'cause I don't know myself,
come o'er in the evenin', come o'er in the evenin',
you'll know from mom, oh, you'll know from mom.
