= Brhlovce =

Brhlovce Borfő
- Municipality
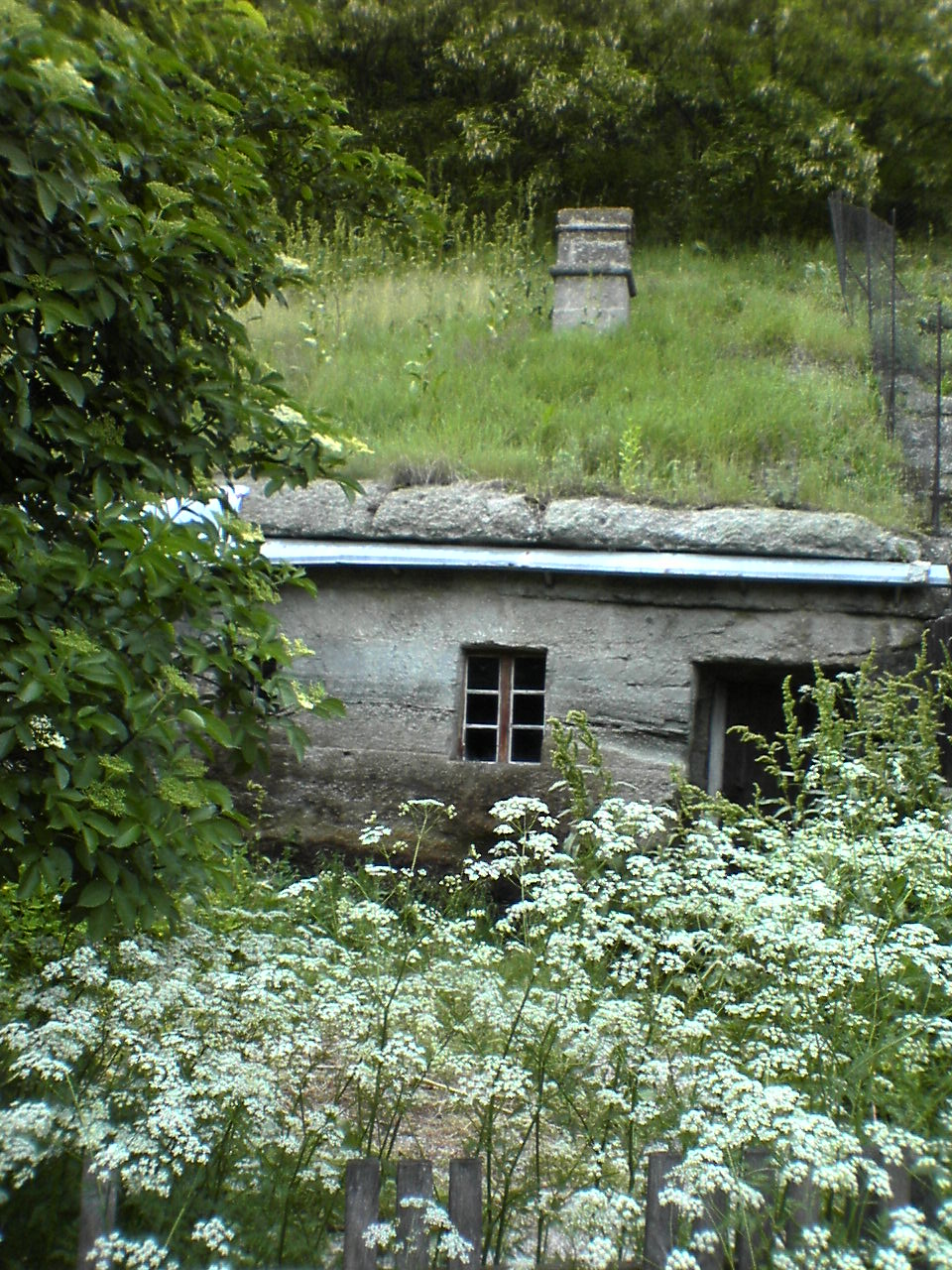
- An example of an excavated house

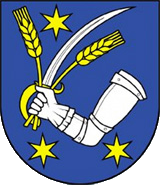
- Flag Coat of arms

- Location of Brhlovce in the Nitra Region Location of Brhlovce in Slovakia
- Coordinates: 48.22°N 18.75°E
- Country: Slovakia
- Region: Nitra Region
- District: Levice District
- First mentioned: 1245

Area
  - Total: 13.38 km^{2} (5.17 sq mi)
- Elevation: 204 m (669 ft)

Population (2025)
  - Total: 295
- Time zone: UTC+1 (CET)
  - Summer (DST): UTC+2 (CEST)
- Postal code: 935 02
- Area code: +421 36
- Vehicle registration plate (until 2022): LV
- Website: www.brhlovce.sk

Brhlovce (Hungarian: Borfő, pronounced [ˈborføː]) is a municipality and village in the Levice District in the south-west of Slovakia, in the Nitra Region.

It was formed in 1952 by a merger of the villages Dolné Brhlovce (Hungarian: Tegzesborfő) and Horné Brhlovce (Hungarian: Kálnaborfő).

It lies some 10 km east of Levice. It is known mainly for its excavated dwellings, cut into the volcanic sub-layer, that have been proposed for the UNESCO World Heritage List.

The excavated dwellings are said to have been constructed by the local people in the 16th and 17th centuries in order to "hide the village" and avoid the Turkish raids. They did not want to build normal ground-level houses because these would be visible from afar.

Brhlovce has a population of 329 people and an area of 13.385 km².

== See also ==
- List of municipalities and towns in Slovakia

== Geography ==
The municipality lies at an altitude of 204 metres (669 ft) and covers an area of 13.38 km^{2} (5.17 sq mi) (2025).

== Population ==
Population statistic (10 years)
Year	1995	2005	2015	2025
Count	358	324	305	295
Difference		−9.49%	−5.86%	−3.27%

Population statistic
Year	2024	2025
Count	292	295
Difference		+1.02%

It has a population of 295 people (31 December 2025).

=== Ethnicity ===
Census 2021 (1+ %)
Ethnicity	Number	Fraction
Slovak	292	98.64%
Czech	6	2.02%
Not found out	3	1.01%
Total	296	

In year 2021 was 296 people by ethnicity 292 as Slovak, 6 as Czech, 3 as Not found out and 1 as Hungarian.

Note on population: The difference values of population numbers in the table "Population statistic" and in the sections "Ethnicity" & "Religion" is caused by the use of various statistical methods.

=== Religion ===
Census 2021 (1+ %)
Religion	Number	Fraction
Roman Catholic Church	169	57.09%
None	79	26.69%
Evangelical Church	36	12.16%
Not found out	8	2.7%
Total	296	

In year 2021 was 296 people by religion 169 from Roman Catholic Church, 79 from None, 36 from Evangelical Church, 8 from Not found out, 2 from Jehovah's Witnesses, 1 from Christian Congregations in Slovakia and 1 from Ad hoc movements.

== Genealogical resources ==
The records for genealogical research are available at the state archive "Statny Archiv in Nitra, Presov, Slovakia"

- Roman Catholic church records (births/marriages/deaths): 1844-1895 (parish B)
- Lutheran church records (births/marriages/deaths): 1746-1896 (parish B)
