= List of streets in Bratislava =

List of streets in Bratislava (Slovak: Zoznam ulíc v Bratislave; Hungarian: A Pozsony utcák listája) is full list of streets in Bratislava assembled by official list of streets of Bratislava promulgated by Magistrát mesta Bratislavy.

Name of street	Borough	Named after	Postcode	Post
Adámiho ulica	Karlova Ves	Pavol Adami	841 05	Bratislava 4
Agátová ulica	Dúbravka	False Acacia	841 01	Bratislava 42
Albánska ulica	Rača	Albania	831 06	Bratislava 35
Albrechtova ulica	Ružinov	Alexander Albrecht	821 03	Bratislava 2
Alejová ulica	Ružinov	Allée	821 08	Bratislava 2
Alešova ulica	Ružinov	Mikoláš Aleš	821 09	Bratislava 2
Alibernetová ulica	Nové Mesto	Alibernet grape	831 02	Bratislava 3
Alstrova ulica	Rača	Móric Alster	831 06	Bratislava 35
Alžbetínska ulica	Staré Mesto	Elizabeth of Hungary	811 09	Bratislava 1
Amarelková ulica	Vrakuňa	Amarena cherry	821 07	Bratislava 214
Ambroseho ulica	Petržalka	Anton Štefan Ambrose	851 02	Bratislava 5
Ambrova ulica	Nové Mesto	Ján Ambro	831 01	Bratislava 37
Ambrušova ulica	Ružinov	Jozef Ambruš	821 04	Bratislava 2
Americká ulica	Nové Mesto	America	831 02	Bratislava 3
Amurská ulica	Podunajské Biskupice	Amur	821 06	Bratislava 214
Andrusovova ulica	Petržalka	Dimitrij Andrusov	851 01	Bratislava 5
Anenská ulica	Staré Mesto	Saint Anne	811 05, 07	Bratislava 1
Anízová ulica	Vrakuňa	Anise	821 07	Bratislava 214
Antická ulica	Rusovce	Antiquity	851 10	Bratislava 59
Antolská ulica	Petržalka	Svätý Anton manor house	851 07	Bratislava 5
Arménska ulica	Vrakuňa	Armenia	821 06	Bratislava 214
Astronomická ulica	Ružinov	Astronomy	821 02	Bratislava 2
Astrová ulica	Ružinov	Aster	821 01	Bratislava 2
Attidova ulica	Rusovce	Attis	851 10	Bratislava 59
Auréliova ulica	Rusovce	Marcus Aurelius	851 10	Bratislava 59
Avarská ulica	Devín	Pannonian Avars	841 10	Bratislava 49
Azalková ulica	Ružinov	Azalea	821 01	Bratislava 2
Azovská ulica	Ružinov	Sea of Azov	821 08	Bratislava 2
Azúrová ulica	Petržalka	Azure	851 07	Bratislava 5
Babuškova ulica	Ružinov	Janko Babušek	821 03	Bratislava 2
Bagarova ulica	Dúbravka	Andrej Bagar	841 01	Bratislava 42
Bachova ulica	Ružinov	Johann Sebastian Bach	821 03	Bratislava 2
Bajkalská ulica	Nové Mesto, Ružinov	Lake Baikal	821 02, 08, 831 04	Bratislava 2, 3
Bajzova ulica	Ružinov	Jozef Ignác Bajza	821 08	Bratislava 2
Bakošova ulica	Lamač	Ján Bakoš	841 03	Bratislava 42
Balkánska ulica	Rusovce	Balkans	851 10	Bratislava 59
Baltská ulica	Podunajské Biskupice	Baltic Sea	821 07	Bratislava 214
Bancíkovej ulica	Ružinov	Mária Bancíková	821 03	Bratislava 2
Banícka ulica	Staré Mesto	Miners	811 04	Bratislava 1
Baničova ulica	Vajnory	Štefan Banič	831 07	Bratislava 36
Baníkova ulica	Karlova Ves		841 04	Bratislava 4
Banskobystrická ulica	Staré Mesto	Banská Bystrica	811 06	Bratislava 1
Banšelova ulica	Ružinov	Koloman Banšell	821 04	Bratislava 2
Bardejovská ulica	Nové Mesto	Bardejov	831 02	Bratislava 3
Bárdošova ulica	Nové Mesto	Gejza Bárdoš	831 01	Bratislava 37
Barancová ulica	Záhorská Bystrica	Baranec mountain	841 06	Bratislava 48
Barónka	Rača		831 06	Bratislava 35
Bartókova ulica	Staré Mesto	Béla Bartók	811 02	Bratislava 1
Bartoňova ulica	Staré Mesto	Martin Bartoň	811 03	Bratislava 1
Bartoškova ulica	Nové Mesto	Vladimír Bartošek	831 04	Bratislava 3
Baštová ulica	Staré Mesto	Bastion	811 03	Bratislava 1
Batkova ulica	Dúbravka	Ján Nepomuk Batka	841 01	Bratislava 42
Bazalková ulica	Vrakuňa	Basil	821 07	Bratislava 214
Bazová ulica	Ružinov	Elderberry	821 08	Bratislava 2
Bazovského ulica	Dúbravka	Miloš Alexander Bazovský	841 01	Bratislava 42
Bažantia ulica	Ružinov	bažant	821 05	Bratislava 2
Bažantnicová ulica	Jarovce	bažantnica	851 10	Bratislava 59
Beblavého ulica	Staré Mesto	Pavel Beblavý	811 01	Bratislava 1
Bebravská ulica	Vrakuňa	Bebrava	821 07	Bratislava 214
Beckovská ulica	Ružinov	Beckov	821 04	Bratislava 2
Bedľová ulica	Karlova Ves	bedľa	841 04	Bratislava 4
Bejdl	Podunajské Biskupice			
Belániková ulica	Karlova Ves	belánik	841 04	Bratislava 4
Belehradská ulica	Nové Mesto	Belehrad	831 04	Bratislava 3
Belianska ulica	Nové Mesto		831 01	Bratislava 37
Belinského ulica	Petržalka	Vissarion Grigorievič Belinskij	851 01	Bratislava 5
Bellova ulica	Nové Mesto	Ján Levoslav Bella	831 01	Bratislava 37
Belopotockého ulica	Staré Mesto	Gašpar Fejérpataky-Belopotocký	811 05	Bratislava 1
Beňadická ulica	Petržalka	Kláštor Hronský Beňadik	851 06	Bratislava 5
Bencúrova ulica	Ružinov	Július Bencúr	821 04	Bratislava 2
Benediktiho ulica	Staré Mesto	Ján Benedikti	811 05	Bratislava 1
Beniakova ulica	Karlova Ves	Valentín Beniak	841 05	Bratislava 4
Beňovského ulica	Dúbravka	Móric Beňovský	841 01	Bratislava 42
Bernolákova ulica	Staré Mesto	Anton Bernolák	811 07	Bratislava 1
Beskydská ulica	Staré Mesto	Beskydy	811 05	Bratislava 1
Betliarska ulica	Petržalka	Kaštieľ v Betliari	851 07	Bratislava 5
Bezekova ulica	Dúbravka	Kazimír Bezek	841 02	Bratislava 42
Bezručova ulica	Staré Mesto	Petr Bezruč	811 09	Bratislava 1
Béžová ulica	Petržalka	béžová farba (beige colour)	851 07	Bratislava 5
Biela ulica	Staré Mesto	biela farba (white colour)	811 01	Bratislava 1
Bielkova ulica	Ružinov		821 04	Bratislava 2
Bieloruská ulica	Podunajské Biskupice	Bielorusko	821 06	Bratislava 214
Bilíkova ulica	Dúbravka	Pavol Bilík	841 01	Bratislava 42
Biskupická ulica	Podunajské Biskupice	Podunajské Biskupice	821 06	Bratislava 214
Björnsonova ulica	Staré Mesto	Bjørnstjerne Bjørnson	811 05	Bratislava 1
Blagoevova ulica	Petržalka	Dimitrij Blagoev	851 04	Bratislava 5
Blatnická ulica	Nové Mesto	Blatnica	831 02	Bratislava 3
Blatúchová ulica	Vrakuňa	blatúch	821 07	Bratislava 214
Bleduľová ulica	Devínska Nová Ves	bleduľa	841 08	Bratislava 49
Blumentálska ulica	Staré Mesto	Blumentál	811 07	Bratislava 1
Blyskáčová ulica	Karlova Ves	blyskáč jarný	841 05	Bratislava 4
Bobuľová ulica	Nové Mesto	bobuľa	831 01	Bratislava 37
Bočná ulica	Ružinov	bok	821 04	Bratislava 2
Bodliaková ulica	Vrakuňa	bodliak	821 07	Bratislava 214
Bodrocká ulica	Podunajské Biskupice	Bodrog	821 07	Bratislava 214
Bodvianska ulica	Vrakuňa	Bodva	821 07	Bratislava 214
Bohrova ulica	Petržalka	Niels Bohr	851 01	Bratislava 5
Bohúňova ulica	Staré Mesto	Emo Bohúň	811 04	Bratislava 1
Bojnická ulica	Nové Mesto, Rača	Bojnice	831 04	Bratislava 3
Borágová ulica	Podunajské Biskupice	borák lekársky	821 06	Bratislava 214
Borekova ulica	Podunajské Biskupice		821 06	Bratislava 214
Borinská ulica	Lamač	Borinka	841 03	Bratislava 42
Borodáčova ulica	Ružinov	Janko Borodáč	821 03	Bratislava 2
Borovicová ulica	Vrakuňa	borovica	821 07	Bratislava 214
Borská ulica	Karlova Ves	Bory (oblasť na Záhorí)	841 04	Bratislava 4
Bosákova ulica	Petržalka	Michal Bosák	851 04	Bratislava 5
Boskovičova ulica	Nové Mesto	Rudjer Josip Bošković	831 01	Bratislava 37
Bošániho ulica	Dúbravka	Gabriel Bošáni	841 01	Bratislava 42
Botanická ulica	Karlova Ves	Botanická záhrada	841 04	Bratislava 4
Bottova ulica	Staré Mesto	Ján Botto	811 09	Bratislava 1
Bôrik	Staré Mesto	Chránený areál Bôrik	811 02	Bratislava 1
Bradáčova ulica	Petržalka	Ján Samuel Bradáč	851 02	Bratislava 5
Bradlianska ulica	Staré Mesto	Bradlo	811 03	Bratislava 1
Brančská ulica	Petržalka	Branč	851 05	Bratislava 5
Bratislavská ulica	Záhorská Bystrica	Bratislava	841 06	Bratislava 48
Bratská ulica	Petržalka		851 01	Bratislava 5
Brečtanová ulica	Nové Mesto	brečtan	831 01	Bratislava 37
Brestová ulica	Ružinov	brest	821 02	Bratislava 2
Brezová ulica	Vrakuňa	breza	821 07	Bratislava 214
Brezovská ulica	Nové Mesto	Brezovec	831 03	Bratislava 3
Brežná ulica	Devínska Nová Ves	breh	841 07	Bratislava 49
Bridlicová ulica	Devínska Nová Ves	bridlica	841 07	Bratislava 49
Briežky	Nové Mesto		831 02	Bratislava 3
Brigádnická ulica	Devín	brigádnik	841 10	Bratislava 49
Brižitská ulica	Dúbravka	hon Brižite	841 01	Bratislava 42
Brnianska ulica	Staré Mesto	Brno	811 04	Bratislava 1
Brodská ulica	Karlova Ves	brod	841 04	Bratislava 4
Bronzová ulica	Rusovce	bronz	851 10	Bratislava 59
Broskyňová ulica	Staré Mesto	broskyňa	811 03	Bratislava 1
Bršlenová ulica	Devínska Nová Ves	bršlen	841 07	Bratislava 49
Brumovická ulica	Záhorská Bystrica	Brumovice	841 06	Bratislava 48
Brusnicová ulica	Nové Mesto	brusnica	831 01	Bratislava 37
Břeclavská ulica	Staré Mesto	Břeclav	811 04	Bratislava 1
Bučinová ulica	Vrakuňa	bučina	821 07	Bratislava 214
Budatínska ulica	Petržalka	Budatín	851 05, 06	Bratislava 5
Búdková ulica	Staré Mesto		811 04	Bratislava 1
Budovateľská ulica	Ružinov	budovateľ	821 08	Bratislava 2
Budyšínska ulica	Nové Mesto	Budyšín	831 02, 03	Bratislava 3
Bujnákova ulica	Dúbravka	Pavel Bujnák	841 01	Bratislava 42
Buková ulica	Staré Mesto	buk	811 02	Bratislava 1
Bukovinská ulica	Rača	Bukovina	831 06	Bratislava 35
Bukureštská ulica	Staré Mesto	Bukurešť	811 04	Bratislava 1
Bulharská ulica	Ružinov	Bulhari	821 04	Bratislava 2
Bulíkova ulica	Petržalka	Ján Bulík	851 04	Bratislava 5
Bullova ulica	Dúbravka	Eduard Bulla	841 01	Bratislava 42
Burgundská ulica	Nové Mesto	Burgundsko		
Buzalkova ulica	Vajnory	Michal Buzalka	831 07	Bratislava 36
Bystrého ulica	Ružinov	Viliam Figuš-Bystrý	821 03	Bratislava 2
Bylinková ulica	Jarovce	bylinka	851 10	Bratislava 59
Bystrická ulica	Devínska Nová Ves	Záhorská Bystrica	841 07	Bratislava 49
Bzovícka ulica	Petržalka	Bzovík	851 07	Bratislava 5
Cabanova ulica	Dúbravka	Izák Caban	841 02	Bratislava 42
Cablkova ulica	Ružinov	Ján Cablk	821 04	Bratislava 2
Cádrova ulica	Nové Mesto	Janko Cádra	831 01	Bratislava 37
Cesta mládeže	Nové Mesto	mládež	831 01	Bratislava 37
Cesta na Červený most	Karlova Ves, Staré Mesto	Červený most	841 04, 05	Bratislava 4
Cesta na Kamzík	Nové Mesto	Kamzík	831 01	Bratislava 37
Cesta na Klanec	Lamač	Klanec	841 03	Bratislava 42
Cesta na Senec	Ružinov, Vajnory	Senec	821 04	Bratislava 2
Cezmínová ulica	Čunovo	cezmína	851 10	Bratislava 59
Cígeľská ulica	Rača	Cígeľ	831 06	Bratislava 35
Cikkerova ulica	Karlova Ves	Ján Cikker	841 05	Bratislava 4
Cintorínska ulica	Staré Mesto	cintorín	811 08	Bratislava 1
Cintulova ulica	Nové Mesto		831 02	Bratislava 3
Colnica Berg	Petržalka	Colnica mountain		
Colnícka ulica	Rusovce	colnica	851 10	Bratislava 59
Cukrová ulica	Staré Mesto	cukor	811 08	Bratislava 1
Cyprichova ulica	Rača	Ondrej Cyprich	831 04	
Cyrilova ulica	Ružinov	Konštantín Filozof	821 08	Bratislava 2
Czambelova ulica	Ružinov	Samuel Czambel		
Čachtická ulica	Rača	Čachtice	831 06	Bratislava 35
Čajakova ulica	Staré Mesto, Nové Mesto	Ján Čajak	811 05, 831 01	Bratislava 1, 37
Čajkovského ulica	Staré Mesto	Piotr Iľjič Čajkovskij	811 04	Bratislava 1
Čakanková ulica	Vrakuňa	čakanka	821 07	Bratislava 214
Čaklovská ulica	Ružinov	Čaklov	821 02	Bratislava 2
Čalovská ulica	Ružinov	Čalovo	821 05	Bratislava 2
Čapkova ulica	Staré Mesto	Karel Čapek	811 04	Bratislava 1
Čárskeho ulica	Karlova Ves	Konštantín Čársky	841 04	Bratislava 4
Čavojského ulica	Karlova Ves	Rudolf Čavojský	841 04	Bratislava 4
Čečinová ulica	Ružinov	čečina	821 05	Bratislava 2
Čelakovského ulica	Staré Mesto	František Ladislav Čelakovský	811 03	Bratislava 1
Čerencová ulica	Záhorská Bystrica	Čerenec	841 06	Bratislava 48
Čerešňová ulica	Staré Mesto	čerešňa	811 04	Bratislava 1
Černicová ulica	Nové Mesto	ostružina černicová	831 01	Bratislava 37
Černockého ulica	Rača			
Černyševského ulica	Petržalka	Nikolaj Gavrilovič Černyševskij	851 01	Bratislava 5
Červená ulica	Rača	červená farba	831 06	Bratislava 35
Červeňákova ulica	Dúbravka		841 01	Bratislava 42
Červeňova ulica	Staré Mesto		811 03	Bratislava 1
Česká ulica	Nové Mesto	Česko	831 03	Bratislava 3
Čiernohorská ulica	Dúbravka	Čierna Hora	841 01	Bratislava 42
Čiernovodská ulica	Vrakuňa	Čierna voda	821 07	Bratislava 214
Čierny chodník	Vajnory	čierny chodník	831 07	Bratislava 36
Čiližská ulica	Vrakuňa	Čiliž	821 07	Bratislava 214
Čipkárska ulica	Ružinov	čipkár	821 09	Bratislava 2
Čmelíkova ulica	Ružinov	Ján Čmelík	821 03	Bratislava 2
Čmeľovec	Staré Mesto		811 02	Bratislava 1
Čremchová ulica	Nové Mesto	čremcha	831 01	Bratislava 37
Čučoriedková ulica	Vrakuňa	brusnica čučoriedková	821 07	Bratislava 214
Čulenova ulica	Staré Mesto	Martin Čulen	811 09	Bratislava 1
Damborského ulica	Dúbravka	Ján Damborský	841 01	Bratislava 42
Dankovského ulica	Staré Mesto	Gregor Dankovský	811 03	Bratislava 1
Dargovská ulica	Petržalka	Dargov	851 01	Bratislava 5
Delená ulica	Devínska Nová Ves		841 07	Bratislava 49
Delená cesta	Devín		841 10	Bratislava 49
Demänovská ulica	Rača	Demänová	831 06	Bratislava 35
Desiata ulica	Nové Mesto	číslo 10	831 01	Bratislava 37
Detvianska ulica	Rača	Detva	831 06	Bratislava 35
Devätinová ulica	Podunajské Biskupice	devätina	821 06	Bratislava 214
Deviata ulica	Nové Mesto	číslo 9	831 01	Bratislava 37
Devínska cesta	Devín, Karlova Ves	Devín	841 04, 10	Bratislava 49, 4
Devínske Jazero	Devínska Nová Ves	Devínske jazero (Šrek)	841 07	Bratislava 49
Diamantová ulica	Jarovce	diamant	851 10	Bratislava 59
Dlhá ulica	Čunovo	dĺžka	851 10	Bratislava 59
Dlhé diely I.	Karlova Ves	Dlhé diely	841 04	Bratislava 4
Dlhé diely II.	Karlova Ves	Dlhé diely	841 04	Bratislava 4
Dlhé diely III.	Karlova Ves	Dlhé diely	841 04	Bratislava 4
Dneperská ulica	Podunajské Biskupice	Dneper	821 06	Bratislava 214
Dobrovičova ulica	Staré Mesto	Michal Dobrovič	811 02, 09	Bratislava 1
Dobrovského ulica	Staré Mesto	Josef Dobrovský	811 08	Bratislava 1
Dobšinského ulica	Staré Mesto	Pavol Dobšinský	811 05	Bratislava 1
Dohnalova ulica	Staré Mesto	Richard Dohnal	811 04	Bratislava 1
Dohnányho ulica	Ružinov	Mikuláš Dohnány	821 08	Bratislava 2
Doležalova ulica	Ružinov		821 04	Bratislava 2
Dolichénska ulica	Rusovce	Doliché	851 10	Bratislava 59
Dolná ulica	Staré Mesto		811 04	Bratislava 1
Dolnokorunská ulica	Devín	Dolné koruny	841 10	Bratislava 49
Dolnozemská cesta	Petržalka	Dolná zem	851 04	Bratislava 5
Domašská ulica	Vrakuňa	Veľká Domaša	821 07	Bratislava 214
Domiciánova ulica	Rusovce	Domicián	851 10	Bratislava 59
Domkárska ulica	Ružinov	domkári	821 05	Bratislava 2
Domové role	Ružinov		821 05	Bratislava 2
Donnerova ulica	Karlova Ves	Georg Rafael Donner	841 04	Bratislava 4
Donovalova ulica	Staré Mesto	Ján Donoval	811 06	Bratislava 1
Donská ulica	Záhorská Bystrica	Don	841 06	Bratislava 48
Dopravná ulica	Rača	železničný uzol	831 06	Bratislava 35
Dorastenecká ulica	Vajnory	dorastenci	831 07	Bratislava 36
Dostojevského rad	Staré Mesto	Fiodor Michajlovič Dostojevskij	811 09	Bratislava 1
Dražická ulica	Dúbravka	hon Dražica	841 01	Bratislava 42
Drevená ulica	Staré Mesto	drevo	811 06	Bratislava 1
Drieňová ulica	Ružinov	drieň	821 01, 02, 03	Bratislava 2
Drobného ulica	Dúbravka		841 01	Bratislava 42
Dropia ulica	Petržalka	drop		
Drotárska cesta	Staré Mesto	drotárstvo	811 02, 04	Bratislava 1
Drozdová ulica	Rača	drozd	831 06	Bratislava 35
Druhá ulica	Nové Mesto	číslo 2	831 01	Bratislava 37
Druidská ulica	Rusovce	druidi	851 10	Bratislava 59
Družicová ulica	Ružinov	družica	821 02	Bratislava 2
Družobná ulica	Podunajské Biskupice	družba	821 06	Bratislava 214
Družstevná ulica	Nové Mesto	družstvo	831 04	Bratislava 3
Dubnická ulica	Petržalka	Dubnica nad Váhom	851 02	
Dubová ulica	Staré Mesto	dub	811 04	Bratislava 1
Dúbravčická ulica	Dúbravka	Dúbravčice	841 02	Bratislava 42
Dúbravská cesta	Karlova Ves	Dúbravka	841 04	Bratislava 4
Dudova ulica	Petržalka	Andrew Duda	851 02	Bratislava 5
Dudvážska ulica	Podunajské Biskupice	Dudváh	821 07	Bratislava 214
Dunajská ulica	Staré Mesto	Dunaj	811 08	Bratislava 1
Dvanásta ulica	Nové Mesto	číslo 12	831 01	Bratislava 37
Dvojkrížna ulica	Podunajské Biskupice, Vrakuňa	dvojkríž	821 06, 07	Bratislava 214
Dvořákovo nábrežie	Staré Mesto	Antonín Dvořák	811 02	Bratislava 1
Ďatelinová ulica	Ružinov	ďatelina	821 01	Bratislava 2
Ďumbierska ulica	Nové Mesto	ďumbier	831 01	Bratislava 37
Ďurgalova ulica	Nové Mesto	Martin Ďurgala	831 01	Bratislava 37
Edisonova ulica	Ružinov	Thomas Alva Edison	821 04	Bratislava 2
Egrešová ulica	Vrakuňa	egreš	821 07	Bratislava 214
Einsteinova ulica	Petržalka	Albert Einstein	851 01	Bratislava 5
Eisnerova ulica	Devínska Nová Ves	Jan Eisner	841 07	Bratislava 49
Elektrárenská ulica	Nové Mesto	elektráreň	831 04	Bratislava 3
Estónska ulica	Podunajské Biskupice, Vrakuňa	Estónsko	821 06, 07	Bratislava 214
Exnárova ulica	Ružinov	Ladislav Exnár	821 03	Bratislava 2
Fadruszova ulica	Karlova Ves	Ján Fadrusz	841 04	Bratislava 4
Fajnorovo nábrežie	Staré Mesto	Štefan Fajnor st.	811 02	Bratislava 1
Fándlyho ulica	Staré Mesto	Juraj Fándly	811 03	Bratislava 1
Farebná ulica	Ružinov	farba	821 05	Bratislava 2
Farská ulica	Staré Mesto	fara		Bratislava 1
Farského ulica	Petržalka	Karel Farský	851 01	Bratislava 5
Fazuľová ulica	Staré Mesto	fazuľa	811 07	Bratislava 1
Fedinova ulica	Petržalka	Konstantin Alexandrovič Fedin	851 01	Bratislava 5
Fedákova ulica	Dúbravka	Ján Fedák	841 02	Bratislava 42
Ferienčíkova ulica	Staré Mesto	Mikuláš Štefan Ferienčík	811 08	Bratislava 1
Fialkové údolie	Staré Mesto	fialka	811 01	Bratislava 1
Fialová ulica	Petržalka	fialová farba	851 07	Bratislava 5
Fibichova ulica	Ružinov	Zdeněk Fibich	821 05	Bratislava 2
Figová ulica	Jarovce	Figa	851 10	Bratislava 59
Fikusová ulica	Jarovce	fikus	851 10	Bratislava 59
Filiálne nádražie	Nové Mesto	Železničná stanica Bratislava filiálka	831 04	Bratislava 3
Fiľakovská ulica	Petržalka	Fiľakovo		
Firmova ulica	Rusovce	Marius Firmus	851 10	Bratislava 59
Fláviovská ulica	Rusovce	Flaviovská dynastia	851 10	Bratislava 59
Flöglova ulica	Staré Mesto	Arnold Flögl	811 05	Bratislava 1
Fongová ulica	Rača		831 06	Bratislava 35
Francisciho ulica	Staré Mesto	Ján Francisci-Rimavský	811 08	Bratislava 1
Frankovská ulica	Nové Mesto	frankovka (odroda vínnej révy)	831 01	Bratislava 37
Františkánska ulica	Staré Mesto	františkáni	811 01	Bratislava 1
Furdekova ulica	Petržalka	Štefan Furdek	851 03, 04	Bratislava 5
Furmanská ulica	Lamač	furmanstvo	841 03	Bratislava 42
Furmintská ulica	Nové Mesto	furmint (odroda vínnej révy)		
Gabčíkova ulica	Karlova Ves	Jozef Gabčík	841 04	Bratislava 4
Gagarinova ulica	Ružinov	Jurij Alexejevič Gagarin	821 01, 03, 05	Bratislava 2
Gajarská ulica	Záhorská Bystrica	Gajary	841 06	Bratislava 48
Gajc	Podunajské Biskupice		821 06	Bratislava 214
Gajova ulica	Staré Mesto	Ljudevit Gaj	811 09	Bratislava 1
Galaktická ulica	Ružinov	galaxy	821 02	Bratislava 2
Galandova ulica	Staré Mesto	Mikuláš Galanda	811	
Galbavého ulica	Dúbravka	Ján Galbavý	841 01	Bratislava 42
Gallayova ulica	Dúbravka	Cyril Gallay	841 02	Bratislava 42
Gallova ulica	Ružinov		821 04	Bratislava 2
Galvaniho ulica	Ružinov	Luigi Galvani	821 04	Bratislava 2
Gašparíkova ulica	Ružinov		821 04	Bratislava 2
Gaštanová ulica	Staré Mesto	gaštan	811 04	Bratislava 1
Gavlovičova ulica	Nové Mesto	Hugolín Gavlovič	831 03	Bratislava 3
Gbelská ulica	Záhorská Bystrica	Gbely	841 06	Bratislava 48
Gelnická ulica	Rača	Gelnica	831 06	Bratislava 35
Gemerská ulica	Ružinov	Gemer	821 08	Bratislava 2
Geologická ulica	Podunajské Biskupice	geológia	821 06	Bratislava 214
Gercenova ulica	Petržalka	Alexandr Ivanovič Gercen	851 01	Bratislava 5
Gerulatská ulica	Rusovce	Gerulata	851 10	Bratislava 59
Gessayova ulica	Petržalka	Ignác Gessay	851 03	Bratislava 5
Gettingova ulica	Petržalka	Milan Alexander Getting	851 04	
Godrova ulica	Staré Mesto	Michal Godra	811 06	Bratislava 1
Gogoľova ulica	Petržalka	Nikolaj Vasilievič Gogoľ	851 01	Bratislava 5
Goláňova ulica	Ružinov	Karol Goláň	821 03	Bratislava 2
Gondova ulica	Staré Mesto	Daniel Gonda	811 02	Bratislava 1
Goralská ulica	Petržalka	Gorali	851 01	Bratislava 5
Gorazdova ulica	Staré Mesto	Gorazd	811 04	Bratislava 1
Gorkého ulica	Staré Mesto	Maxim Gorkij	811 01	Bratislava 1
Gregorovej ulica	Ružinov	Hana Gregorová	821 03	Bratislava 2
Gronárska ulica	Devín	Gronáre (Koruny)	841 10	Bratislava 49
Grösslingová ulica	Staré Mesto	záhon Grössling	811 09	Bratislava 1
Gruzínska ulica	Ružinov	Gruzínsko	821 05	Bratislava 2
Gunduličova ulica	Staré Mesto	Ivan Gundulić	811 05	Bratislava 1
Guothova ulica	Nové Mesto	Jonáš Bohumil Guoth	831 01	Bratislava 37
Gusevova ulica	Ružinov		821 09	Bratislava 2
Haanova ulica	Petržalka	Ľudovít Haan	851 04	Bratislava 5
Haburská ulica	Ružinov	Habura	821 01	Bratislava 2
Hadia cesta	Devín	hady	841 10	Bratislava 49
Hadriánova ulica	Rusovce	Hadrián	851 10	Bratislava 59
Hagarova ulica	Rača	Jozef Hagara		Bratislava 35
Hájenka	Rusovce			
Hájnická ulica	Karlova Ves	hájnictvo		
Hájová ulica	Rusovce	háj	851 10	Bratislava 59
Hájovňa	Podunajské Biskupice			
Halašova ulica	Nové Mesto		831 03	Bratislava 3
Hálkova ulica	Nové Mesto	Vítězslav Hálek	831 03	Bratislava 3
Hálova ulica	Petržalka	Jan Hála	851 01	Bratislava 5
Hamuliakova ulica	Ružinov	Martin Hamuljak	821 09	Bratislava 2
Hanácka ulica	Ružinov	Haná	821 04	Bratislava 2
Handlovská ulica	Petržalka	Handlová	851 01	Bratislava 5
Hanulova ulica	Dúbravka	Jozef Hanula	841 01, 02	Bratislava 42
Hargašova ulica	Záhorská Bystrica		841 06	Bratislava 48
Harmanecká ulica	Petržalka	Harmanec	851 01	
Harmincova ulica	Dúbravka	Milan Michal Harminc	841 01	Bratislava 42
Hasičská ulica	Ružinov	hasiči	821 04	Bratislava 2
Hattalova ulica	Nové Mesto	Martin Hattala	831 03	Bratislava 3
Havelkova ulica	Lamač	Karol Havelka	841 03	Bratislava 42
Havlíčkova ulica	Staré Mesto	Karel Havlíček Borovský	811 04	Bratislava 1
Havrania ulica	Staré Mesto	havran čierny		
Haydnova ulica	Staré Mesto	Joseph Haydn	811 02	Bratislava 1
Hečkova ulica	Rača	František Hečko	831 06	
Herlianska ulica	Ružinov	Herľany	821 02, 03	Bratislava 2
Heydukova ulica	Staré Mesto	Adolf Heyduk	811 08	Bratislava 1
Heyrovského ulica	Lamač	Jaroslav Heyrovský	841 03	Bratislava 42
Hlaváčiková ulica	Karlova Ves	hlaváčik	841 05	Bratislava 4
Hlavatého ulica	Staré Mesto		811 03	Bratislava 1
Hlavná ulica	Nové Mesto		831 01	Bratislava 37
Hlbinná ulica	Podunajské Biskupice	hlbina	821 06	Bratislava 214
Hlboká cesta	Staré Mesto	hĺbka	811 04, 05	Bratislava 1
Hlinícka ulica	Rača	hliník		
Hlivová ulica	Karlova Ves	hliva	841 04	Bratislava 4
Hlohová ulica	Vrakuňa	hloh	821 07	Bratislava 214
Hlučínska ulica	Nové Mesto	Hlučín	831 03	Bratislava 3
Hnilecká ulica	Vrakuňa	Hnilec	821 07	Bratislava 214
Hodálova ulica	Karlova Ves		841 04	Bratislava 4
Hodonínska ulica	Lamač, Záhorská Bystrica	Hodonín	840 02, 841 03	Bratislava 42
Holekova ulica	Staré Mesto		811 04	Bratislava 1
Holíčska ulica	Petržalka	Holíč	851 05	Bratislava 5
Hollého ulica	Staré Mesto	Ján Hollý	811 08	Bratislava 1
Holubyho ulica	Staré Mesto	Karol Holuby	811 03	Bratislava 1
Homolova ulica	Dúbravka		841 02	Bratislava 42
Hontianska ulica	Ružinov	Hont	821 09	Bratislava 2
Horárska ulica	Ružinov	horári	821 09	Bratislava 2
Horcová ulica	Vrakuňa	horec	821 07	Bratislava 214
Horná ulica	Rača		831 52	Bratislava 35
Vančurova ulica	Nové Mesto		831 01	Bratislava 37
Hornádska ulica	Podunajské Biskupice	Hornád	821 07	Bratislava 214
Horné Židiny	Nové Mesto		830 00	Bratislava 3
Horníkova ulica	Ružinov			
Horská ulica	Nové Mesto	hora	831 01	Bratislava 3
Horského ulica	Nové Mesto			
Hospodárska ulica	Vajnory	hospodárstvo	831 07	Bratislava 36
Hrabový chodník	Nové Mesto	hrab	831 01	Bratislava 37
Hradištná ulica	Devínska Nová Ves	hradisko	841 07	Bratislava 49
Hradná ulica	Devín	Devínsky hrad	841 10	Bratislava 49
Hradné údolie	Staré Mesto	Bratislavský hrad	811 01	Bratislava 1
Hradská ulica	Vrakuňa		821 07	Bratislava 214
Hrachová ulica	Ružinov	hrach	821 05	Bratislava 2
Hraničiarska ulica	Čunovo	hraničiari	851 10	Bratislava 59
Hraničná ulica	Ružinov	hranica	821 05	Bratislava 2
Hrdličkova ulica	Nové Mesto		831 01	Bratislava 37
Hrebendova ulica	Staré Mesto	Matej Hrebenda	811 02	Bratislava 1
Hríbová ulica	Ružinov	hríby	821 05	Bratislava 2
Hriňovská ulica	Staré Mesto	Hriňová	811 02	
Hrobákova ulica	Petržalka	Filip Hrobák	851 02	Bratislava 5
Hrobárska ulica	Petržalka	hrobár	851 01	Bratislava 5
Hroboňova ulica	Staré Mesto	Samo Bohdan Hroboň	811 04	Bratislava 1
Hronská ulica	Podunajské Biskupice	Hron	821 07	Bratislava 214
Hroznová ulica	Nové Mesto	hrozno	831 01	Bratislava 37
Hrušková ulica	Rača	hruška	831 06	Bratislava 35
Hrušovská ulica	Vrakuňa	miestna časť Hrušov	821 07	Bratislava 214
Hubeného ulica	Rača	Viliam Hubený	831 53	Bratislava 35
Hudecova ulica	Karlova Ves		841 04	Bratislava 4
Hummelova ulica	Staré Mesto	Johann Nepomuk Hummel	811 03	Bratislava 1
Husova ulica	Nové Mesto	Jan Hus	831 01	Bratislava 37
Húščavova ulica	Dúbravka	Alexander Húščava	841 01	Bratislava 42
Hutnícka ulica	Devín	hutníctvo	841 10	Bratislava 49
Hviezdna ulica	Podunajské Biskupice	hviezdy	821 06	Bratislava 214
Hviezdoslavova ulica	Podunajské Biskupice	P. O. Hviezdoslav	821 06	Bratislava 214
Hybešova ulica	Rača		831 06	Bratislava 35
Hydinárska ulica	Podunajské Biskupice	hydinárstvo	821 06	Bratislava 214
Hýlia ulica	Petržalka	hýľ		
Hýrošova ulica	Staré Mesto	Štefan Nikolaj Hýroš	811 04	Bratislava 1
Chalupkova ulica	Staré Mesto	Samo Chalupka	811 09	Bratislava 1
Charkovská ulica	Devínska Nová Ves	Charkov	841 07	Bratislava 49
Chemická ulica	Nové Mesto	chémia	831 04	Bratislava 3
Chladná ulica	Rača	chlad	831 06	Bratislava 35
Chlumeckého ulica	Ružinov	Václav Chlumecký	821 03	Bratislava 2
Chorvátska ulica	Staré Mesto	Chorvátsko	811 08	Bratislava 1
Chotárna ulica	Jarovce	chotár	851 10	Bratislava 59
Chrasťová ulica	Nové Mesto		831 01	Bratislava 37
Chrobákova ulica	Dúbravka	Dobroslav Chrobák	841 02	Bratislava 42
Iberková ulica	Čunovo		851 10	Bratislava 59
Ibišteková ulica	Čunovo	ibištek	851 10	Bratislava 59
Ihličnatá ulica	Vrakuňa	ihličnany	821 07	Bratislava 214
Ihrisková ulica	Rača	ihrisko	831 06	Bratislava 35
Iľjušinova ulica	Petržalka	Sergej Vladimirovič Iliušin	851 01	Bratislava 5
Ilkovičova ulica	Karlova Ves	Dionýz Ilkovič	841 04	Bratislava 4
Ílová ulica	Devínska Nová Ves	íl	841 07	Bratislava 49
Ilýrska ulica	Rusovce	Ilýri	851 10	Bratislava 59
Imelová ulica	Vrakuňa	imelo	821 07	Bratislava 214
Inovecká ulica	Staré Mesto	Inovec	811 01, 03	Bratislava 1
Ipeľská ulica	Podunajské Biskupice	Ipeľ	821 07	Bratislava 214
Irisová ulica	Vrakuňa	iris	821 07	Bratislava 214
Irkutská ulica	Rusovce	Irkutsk	851 10	Bratislava 59
Iršajská ulica	Nové Mesto	iršaj	831 01	Bratislava 37
Iskerníková ulica	Karlova Ves	iskerník	841 05	Bratislava 4
Istrijská ulica	Devínska Nová Ves	Istria	841 07	Bratislava 49
Ivanská cesta	Ružinov	Ivanka pri Dunaji	821 04	Bratislava 2
Jabloňová ulica	Ružinov	jabloň	821 05	Bratislava 2
Jačmenná ulica	Vajnory	jačmeň	831 07	Bratislava 36
Jadranská ulica	Dúbravka	Jadranské more	841 01	Bratislava 42
Jadrová ulica	Ružinov	jadro	821 02	Bratislava 2
Jahodová ulica	Nové Mesto	jahoda	831 01	Bratislava 37
Jakabova ulica	Ružinov		821 04	Bratislava 2
Jakubíkova ulica	Nové Mesto		831 01	Bratislava 37
Jakubská ulica	Rača		831 06	Bratislava 35
Jalovcová ulica	Nové Mesto	jalovec	831 01	Bratislava 3
Jamnického ulica	Karlova Ves	Ján Jamnický	841 05	Bratislava 4
Janáčkova ulica	Staré Mesto	Leoš Janáček	811 08	Bratislava 1
Jančova ulica	Staré Mesto		811 02	Bratislava 1
Janíkov dvor	Petržalka			
Janíkovské role	Petržalka		851 01	Bratislava 5
Jankolova ulica	Petržalka	Matúš Jankola	851 04	Bratislava 5
Jánošíková ulica	Staré Mesto	Juraj Jánošík	811 04	Bratislava 1
Janoškova ulica	Nové Mesto	Jur Janoška	831 02	Bratislava 3
Janotova ulica	Karlova Ves		841 04	Bratislava 4
Jánska ulica	Staré Mesto	svätý Ján	811 07	Bratislava 1
Janšákova ulica	Devínska Nová Ves	Štefan Janšák	841 07	Bratislava 49
Jantárová ulica	Jarovce	jantár	850 09, 851 10	Bratislava 59
Jantárová cesta	Petržalka	Jantárová cesta (história)	851 06	Bratislava 5
Jarabinková ulica	Ružinov	jarabinka	821 09	Bratislava 2
Jarná ulica	Ružinov	jar	821 05	Bratislava 2
Jaroslavova ulica	Petržalka		851 01	Bratislava 5
Jarošova ulica	Nové Mesto		831 03	Bratislava 3
Jasencová ulica	Devínska Nová Ves	jasenec	841 07	Bratislava 49
Jaseňová ulica	Staré Mesto	jaseň	811 04	Bratislava 1
Jaskový rad	Nové Mesto	jask (tunnel, arch.)	831 01	Bratislava 37
Jasná ulica	Ružinov	jas	821 04	Bratislava 2
Jasovská ulica	Petržalka	Jasovský hrad	851 07	Bratislava 5
Jastrabia ulica	Ružinov	jastrab	821 05	Bratislava 2
Jašíkova ulica	Ružinov	Rudolf Jašík	821 03	Bratislava 2
Javorinská ulica	Staré Mesto	Javorina	811 03	Bratislava 1
Javorová ulica	Staré Mesto	javor	811 04	Bratislava 1
Jazdecká ulica	Nové Mesto	jazdectvo	831 03	Bratislava 3
Jazerná ulica	Jarovce	jazero	851 10	Bratislava 5
Jazmínová ulica	Vrakuňa	jazmín	821 07	Bratislava 214
Jedenásta ulica	Nové Mesto	číslo 11	831 01	Bratislava 3
Jedlíkova ulica	Staré Mesto	Štefan Anián Jedlík	811 06	Bratislava 1
Jedľová ulica	Vrakuňa	jedľa	821 07	Bratislava 214
Jégého ulica	Ružinov	Ladislav Nádaši-Jégé	821 08	Bratislava 2
Jegenešská ulica	Podunajské Biskupice	Jegeneš	821 06	Bratislava 214
Jelačičova ulica	Ružinov	Josip Jelačič	821 08	Bratislava 2
Jelenia ulica	Staré Mesto	jelene	811 05	Bratislava 1
Jelšová ulica	Nové Mesto	jelša	831 01	Bratislava 37
Jeséniova ulica	Nové Mesto	Ján Jesenius	831 01	Bratislava 37
Jesenná ulica	Ružinov	jeseň	821 02	Bratislava 2
Jesenského ulica	Staré Mesto	Janko Jesenský	811 02	Bratislava 1
Jesienková ulica	Vrakuňa	jesienka	821 07	Bratislava 214
Jiráskova ulica	Petržalka	Alois Jirásek	851 01	Bratislava 5
Jiskrova ulica	Nové Mesto	Jan Jiskra	831 04	Bratislava 3
Jókaiho ulica	Podunajské Biskupice	Mór Jókai	821 06	Bratislava 214
Jonatánová ulica	Podunajské Biskupice		821 06	Bratislava 214
Jozefská ulica	Staré Mesto	Jozef Nazaretský	811 06	Bratislava 1
Júlová ulica	Nové Mesto	júl	831 01	Bratislava 37
Junácka ulica	Nové Mesto		831 04	Bratislava 3
Jungmannova ulica	Petržalka	Josef Jungmann	851 01	Bratislava 5
Júnová ulica	Nové Mesto	jún	831 01	Bratislava 37
Jurkovičova ulica	Rača	Dušan Jurkovič	831 06	Bratislava 35
Jurovského ulica	Staré Mesto	Šimon Jurovský		
Jurská ulica	Nové Mesto	Svätý Jur	831 02	Bratislava 3
Justičná ulica	Staré Mesto	Justičný palác	811 07	Bratislava 1
K Horánskej studni	Dúbravka	Horánska studňa	841 01	Bratislava 42
K lomu	Staré Mesto	lom	811 04	Bratislava 1
K pasienkom	Čunovo	pasienky	851 10	Bratislava 59
K Železnej studienke	Staré Mesto	Železná studnička	811 04	Bratislava 1
Kadnárova ulica	Rača	Anton Kadnár	831 06	Bratislava 35
Kafendova ulica	Rača	Frico Kafenda	831 06	Bratislava 35
Kajerka	Dúbravka		841 02	Bratislava 42
Kalinčiakova ulica	Nové Mesto	Ján Kalinčiak	831 04	Bratislava 3
Kalinová ulica	Vrakuňa	kalina	821 07	Bratislava 214
Kalištná ulica	Devínska Nová Ves	Kalište	841 07	Bratislava 49
Kaméliová ulica	Vrakuňa	kamélia	821 07	Bratislava 214
Kamenárska ulica	Ružinov	kamenári	821 04	Bratislava 2
Kamilková ulica	Rača	kamilky	830 05, 831 06	Bratislava 35
Kamzík - Les	Nové Mesto	vrch Kamzík	830 07	Bratislava 37
Kamzík - Vrch	Nové Mesto	vrch Kamzík	830 07	Bratislava 37
Kananefatská ulica	Rusovce	Kananefati	851 10	Bratislava 59
Kapicova ulica	Petržalka	Piotr Leonidovič Kapica	851 01	Bratislava 5
Kapitulská ulica	Staré Mesto	kapitula	811 01	Bratislava 1
Kapitulský dvor	Petržalka	kapitula	851 07	Bratislava 5
Kaplinská ulica	Rača		831 06	Bratislava 35
Kapsohradská ulica	Záhorská Bystrica	Kapsohrad	841 06	Bratislava 48
Kapucínska ulica	Staré Mesto	kapucíni	811 03	Bratislava 1
Kapušianska ulica	Ružinov	Kapušany	821 02	Bratislava 2
Karadžičova ulica	Ružinov, Staré Mesto	Vuk Stefanović Karadžić	811 07, 08, 09, 821 08	Bratislava 1, 2
Karloveská ulica	Karlova Ves	Karlova Ves	841 04	Bratislava 4
Karloveské rameno	Karlova Ves	rameno Dunaja	841 04	Bratislava 4
Karpatská ulica	Staré Mesto	Karpaty	811 05	Bratislava 1
Kašmírska ulica	Ružinov	Kašmír	821 04	Bratislava 2
Kaštieľska ulica	Ružinov	kaštieľ	821 05	Bratislava 2
Kaukazská ulica	Petržalka	Kaukaz	851 01	Bratislava 5
Kazanská ulica	Podunajské Biskupice, Vrakuňa	Kazaň	821 06, 07	Bratislava 214
Keltská ulica	Rusovce	Kelti	851 10	Bratislava 59
Kempelenova ulica	Karlova Ves	Johann Wolfgang Kempelen	841 04	Bratislava 4
Keplerova ulica	Ružinov	Johannes Kepler		
Ketelec	Podunajské Biskupice		821 06	Bratislava 214
Kladnianska ulica	Ružinov	Kladno	821 05	Bratislava 2
Klariská ulica	Staré Mesto	Klarisky	811 03	Bratislava 1
Kláštorská ulica	Ružinov	kláštor	821 05	Bratislava 2
Klatovská ulica	Nové Mesto, Ružinov	Klatovy	821 04, 831 04	Bratislava 2
Klemensova ulica	Staré Mesto	Jozef Božetech Klemens	811 09	Bratislava 1
Klenová ulica	Nové Mesto	klen	831 01	Bratislava 37
Klimkovičova ulica	Dúbravka	Florián Klimkovič	841 01	Bratislava 42
Klincová ulica	Ružinov	klinec	821 08	Bratislava 2
Klobučnícka ulica	Staré Mesto	klobučníctvo	811 01	Bratislava 1
Klokočova ulica	Petržalka	Ondrej Klokoč (pôvodne klokoč)	851 01	Bratislava 5
Kľukatá ulica	Ružinov		821 05	Bratislava 2
Kĺzavá ulica	Nové Mesto	kĺzanie	831 01, 07	Bratislava 37
Knižkova cesta	Rača		831 06	Bratislava 35
Koceľova ulica	Ružinov	Koceľ	821 08	Bratislava 2
Kočánkova ulica	Petržalka		851 04	Bratislava 5
Kohútova ulica	Ružinov		821 08	Bratislava 2
Koľajná ulica	Rača	koľajnice	831 06	Bratislava 35
Kolárska ulica	Staré Mesto	kolárstvo	811 06	Bratislava 1
Kolískova ulica	Karlova Ves	Alois Kolísek	841 05	Bratislava 4
Kollárova ulica	Záhorská Bystrica	Ján Kollár	841 06	Bratislava 48
Kolmá ulica	Petržalka	kolmica	851 01	Bratislava 5
Komárňanská ulica	Ružinov	Komárno	821 05	Bratislava 2
Komárnická ulica	Ružinov	Vyšný Komárnik	821 02, 03	Bratislava 2
Komárovská ulica	Podunajské Biskupice	Komárov	821 06	Bratislava 214
Kominárska ulica	Nové Mesto	kominár	831 04	Bratislava 3
Komonicová ulica	Karlova Ves	Komonica lekárska	841 05	Bratislava 4
Koncová ulica	Vajnory	koniec	831 07	Bratislava 36
Koniarkova ulica	Vajnory	Ján Koniarek	831 07	Bratislava 36
Konopiská	Čunovo		851 10	Bratislava 59
Konopná ulica	Ružinov	konopa	821 05	Bratislava 2
Konvalinková ulica	Karlova Ves	konvalinka	841 04	Bratislava 4
Konventná ulica	Staré Mesto	konvent	811 03	Bratislava 1
Kopáč	Ružinov			
Kopanice	Ružinov	kopanica	821 04	Bratislava 2
Kopčianska ulica	Petržalka	Kopčany	851 01	
Kopernikova ulica	Ružinov	Mikuláš Kopernik	821 04	Bratislava 2
Koprivnická ulica	Dúbravka	odkanalizovaný potok v Dúbravke	841 01, 02	Bratislava 42
Korabinského ulica	Staré Mesto	Ján Matej Korabinský	811 02	Bratislava 1
Koreničova ulica	Staré Mesto	Karol Korenič	811 03	Bratislava 1
Koreňová ulica	Jarovce	koreň	851 10	Bratislava 59
Korunská ulica	Devín		841 10	Bratislava 49
Korytnická ulica	Podunajské Biskupice	Korytnica	821 06	Bratislava 214
Kosatcová ulica	Devínska Nová Ves	kosatec	841 07	Bratislava 49
Kosodrevinová ulica	Vrakuňa	kosodrevina	821 07	Bratislava 214
Kostlivého ulica	Ružinov	Stanislav Kostlivý	821 03	Bratislava 2
Kostolná ulica	Staré Mesto	kostol	811 01	Bratislava 1
Košická ulica	Ružinov, Staré Mesto	Košice	821 08, 09	Bratislava 2
Kovácsova ulica	Rusovce	Július Kovács	851 10	Bratislava 59
Kováčska ulica	Nové Mesto	kováč	831 04	Bratislava 3
Kovorobotnícka ulica	Ružinov	kovorobotník	821 04	Bratislava 2
Kovová ulica	Podunajské Biskupice	kov	821 06	Bratislava 214
Kozia ulica	Staré Mesto	koza	811 03	Bratislava 1
Koziarka	Nové Mesto		830 00	Bratislava 3
Kozičova ulica	Devín	Eduard Kozič	841 10	Bratislava 49
Kozmonautická ulica	Ružinov	kozmonaut	821 02	Bratislava 2
Kožušnícka ulica	Jarovce	kožušník	851 10	Bratislava 59
Kôstková ulica	Jarovce	kôstka	851 10	Bratislava 59
Krahulčia ulica	Nové Mesto	krahulec	831 01	Bratislava 37
Krajinská ulica	Podunajské Biskupice		821 06	Bratislava 214
Krajinská cesta	Ružinov		821 07	Bratislava 214
Krajná ulica	Ružinov	okraj	821 04	Bratislava 2
Krakovská ulica	Staré Mesto	Kraków	811 03	Bratislava 1
Kráľovské údolie	Staré Mesto	kráľ	811 02	Bratislava 1
Kramériova ulica	Ružinov			
Krasinského ulica	Ružinov		821 04	Bratislava 2
Kraskova ulica	Nové Mesto	Ivan Krasko	831 02	Bratislava 3
Krásna ulica	Ružinov	krása	821 05	Bratislava 2
Krásnohorská ulica	Petržalka	Krásna Hôrka	851 07	Bratislava 5
Krasovského ulica	Petržalka	Feodosij Nikolajevič Krasovskij	851 01	Bratislava 5
Kratiny	Vajnory		831 07	Bratislava 36
Krátka ulica	Staré Mesto	Dĺžka	811 03	Bratislava 1
Krčméryho ulica	Staré Mesto	Štefan Krčméry	811 04	Bratislava 1
Kremeľská ulica	Devín	Kremeľ	841 10	Bratislava 49
Kremencová ulica	Devínska Nová Ves	kremenec	841 07	Bratislava 49
Kremnická ulica	Petržalka	Kremnica	851 01	Bratislava 5
Kresánkova ulica	Karlova Ves		841 05	Bratislava 4
Kríková ulica	Vrakuňa	krík	821 07	Bratislava 214
Krivá ulica	Staré Mesto	Krivka	811 04	Bratislava 1
Križkova ulica	Staré Mesto	Pavol Križko	811 04	Bratislava 1
Krížna ulica	Nové Mesto, Ružinov, Staré Mesto	Kríž	811 07, 08	Bratislava 1, 2
Križovatka Jozefa Čabelku	Nové Mesto	Jozef Čabelka		
Krmanova ulica	Staré Mesto	Daniel Krman	811 03	Bratislava 1
Krokusová ulica	Vrakuňa	krókus	821 07	Bratislava 214
Krompašská ulica	Ružinov	Krompachy	821 04	Bratislava 2
Krupinská ulica	Petržalka	Krupina	851 01	Bratislava 5
Krupkova ulica	Staré Mesto	František Krupka	811 09	Bratislava 1
Krušpánová ulica	Čunovo	krušpán	851 10	Bratislava 59
Kubačova ulica	Rača		831 06	Bratislava 35
Kubániho ulica	Staré Mesto	Ľudovít Kubáni	811 04	Bratislava 1
Kubínska ulica	Petržalka	Dolný Kubín	851 01	Bratislava 5
Kučovanická ulica	Záhorská Bystrica	kučovanica (klčovisko)		
Kudlákova ulica	Dúbravka	Ľudovít Kudlák	841 01	Bratislava 42
Kuklovská ulica	Karlova Ves	Kuklov	841 04	Bratislava 4
Kúkoľová ulica	Vajnory	kúkoľ	831 07	Bratislava 36
Kukučínova ulica	Nové Mesto	Martin Kukučín	831 03	Bratislava 3
Kukuričná ulica	Nové Mesto	kukurica	831 03	Bratislava 3
Kulíškova ulica	Ružinov	Juraj Ľubomil Kulíšek	821 08	Bratislava 2
Kultúrna ulica	Ružinov	kultúra	821 04	Bratislava 2
Kunerádska ulica	Lamač	Kunerad	841 03	Bratislava 42
Kupeckého ulica	Ružinov	Ján Kupecký	821 08	Bratislava 2
Kúpeľná ulica	Staré Mesto	kúpele	811 02	Bratislava 1
Kurucova ulica	Nové Mesto		831 01	Bratislava 37
Kutlíkova ulica	Petržalka	Vendelín Bohboj Kutlík	851 02	Bratislava 5
Kútska ulica	Záhorská Bystrica	Kúty	841 06	Bratislava 48
Kutuzovova ulica	Nové Mesto	Michail Illarionovič Kutuzov	831 03	Bratislava 3
Kuzmányho ulica	Staré Mesto	Karol Kuzmány	811 06	Bratislava 1
Kvačalova ulica	Ružinov	Ján Radomil Kvačala	821 01	Bratislava 2
Kvetinárska ulica	Podunajské Biskupice	kvetinárstvo	821 06	Bratislava 214
Kvetná ulica	Ružinov	kvet	821 08	Bratislava 2
Kýčerského ulica	Staré Mesto	Pavel Kokeš-Kýčerský	811 05	Bratislava 1
Kyjevská ulica	Nové Mesto	Kyjev	831 02	Bratislava 3
Kysucká ulica	Staré Mesto	Kysuce	811 04	Bratislava 1
Laborecká ulica	Nové Mesto	Laborec	831 04	Bratislava 3
Labutia ulica	Petržalka	labuť		
Lackova ulica	Karlova Ves		841 04	Bratislava 4
Ladzianskeho ulica	Nové Mesto	Július Ladziansky	831 01	Bratislava 37
Lachova ulica	Petržalka	Ján Lach	851 03	Bratislava 5
Lamačská cesta	Lamač, Staré Mesto	Lamač	811 04, 841 03, 841 04	Bratislava 1, 4, 42
Lamanského ulica	Nové Mesto		831 03	Bratislava 3
Lančárska ulica	Záhorská Bystrica	Lančár	841 06	Bratislava 48
Landauova ulica	Dúbravka	Ladislav Landau	841 01	Bratislava 42
Landererova ulica	Staré Mesto	Ján Michal Landerer	811 09	Bratislava 1
Langsfeldova ulica	Staré Mesto	Juraj Langsfeld	811 04	Bratislava 1
Laskomerského ulica	Nové Mesto	Gustáv Kazimír Zechenter-Laskomerský	831 03	Bratislava 3
Laténska ulica	Rusovce	laténska doba	851 10	Bratislava 59
Latorická ulica	Podunajské Biskupice	Latorica	821 07	Bratislava 214
Laučekova ulica	Staré Mesto		811 04	Bratislava 1
Laurinská ulica	Staré Mesto	sv. Vavrinec	811 01	Bratislava 1
Lazaretská ulica	Staré Mesto	lazaret	811 08, 09	Bratislava 1
Leánska ulica	Nové Mesto			
Lediny	Lamač		841 03	Bratislava 42
Legerského ulica	Nové Mesto		831 02	Bratislava 3
Legionárska ulica	Nové Mesto, Staré Mesto	legionári	811 07, 831 04	Bratislava 1, 3
Lehockého ulica	Staré Mesto	Emanuel Lehocký	811 05, 06	Bratislava 1
Leknová ulica	Vrakuňa	lekno	821 07	Bratislava 214
Lenardova ulica	Petržalka	Philipp Lenard	851 01	Bratislava 5
Leopoldov majer	Záhorská Bystrica		841 06	Bratislava 48
Lermontovova ulica	Staré Mesto	Michail Jurievič Lermontov	811 05	Bratislava 1
Lesná ulica	Staré Mesto	les	811 04	Bratislava 1
Lesnícka ulica	Rusovce	lesníctvo	851 10	Bratislava 59
Leškova ulica	Staré Mesto		811 04	Bratislava 1
Letecká ulica	Nové Mesto	letectvo	831 03	Bratislava 3
Letná ulica	Nové Mesto	leto	831 03	Bratislava 3
Levanduľová ulica	Vrakuňa	levanduľa	821 07	Bratislava 214
Levárska ulica	Karlova Ves	Leváre	841 04	Bratislava 4
Levická ulica	Ružinov	Levice	821 08	Bratislava 2
Levočská ulica	Petržalka	Levoča	851 01	Bratislava 5
Lidická ulica	Ružinov	Lidice	821 04	Bratislava 2
Lieskovec	Podunajské Biskupice		821 06	Bratislava 214
Lieskovská cesta	Podunajské Biskupice		821 06	Bratislava 214
Lietavská ulica	Petržalka	Lietava	851 06	Bratislava 5
Lichardova ulica	Staré Mesto		811 03	Bratislava 1
Likavská ulica	Nové Mesto	Likava	831 01	Bratislava 37
Limbová ulica	Nové Mesto	limba	831 01	Bratislava 37
Linzbothova ulica	Podunajské Biskupice		821 06	Bratislava 214
Lipová ulica	Staré Mesto	lipa	811 02	Bratislava 1
Lipovinová ulica	Nové Mesto	lipovina	831 02	Bratislava 3
Lipského ulica	Dúbravka	Ján Lipský	841 01	Bratislava 42
Liptovská ulica	Ružinov	Liptov	821 09	Bratislava 2
Lisovňa	Rača	lisovňa	831 06	Bratislava 35
Listová ulica	Ružinov	list	821 05	Bratislava 2
Líščie nivy	Ružinov		821 08	Bratislava 2
Líščie údolie	Karlova Ves	Líščie údolie	841 04	Bratislava 4
Litovská ulica	Karlova Ves	Litva	841 04	Bratislava 4
Lodná ulica	Staré Mesto	loď	811 02	Bratislava 1
Lombardiniho ulica	Nové Mesto	Alexander Lombardini	831 03	Bratislava 3
Lomnická ulica	Devín		841 10	Bratislava 49
Lomonosovova ulica	Staré Mesto	Michail Vasilievič Lomonosov	811 09	Bratislava 1
Longobardská ulica	Rusovce	Longobardi	851 10	Bratislava 59
Lónyaiova ulica	Rusovce	Elemír Lónyai	851 10	Bratislava 59
Lopárska ulica	Podunajské Biskupice		821 06	Bratislava 214
Lopenícka ulica	Nové Mesto	Lopeník	831 02	Bratislava 3
Lopúchová ulica	Nové Mesto	lopúch	831 01	Bratislava 37
Lotyšská ulica	Podunajské Biskupice	Lotyšsko	821 06	Bratislava 214
Lovinského ulica	Staré Mesto	Ján Gáber-Lovinský	811 04	Bratislava 1
Lozornianska ulica	Záhorská Bystrica	Lozorno	841 06	Bratislava 48
Lubinská ulica	Staré Mesto		811 03	Bratislava 1
Lúčna ulica	Ružinov	lúka	821 05	Bratislava 2
Luhačovická ulica	Ružinov	Luhačovice	821 04	Bratislava 2
Lužická ulica	Staré Mesto	Lužica	811 08	Bratislava 1
Lužná ulica	Petržalka	lužný les	851 04	Bratislava 5
Lýcejná ulica	Staré Mesto	lýceum	811 03	Bratislava 1
Lykovcová ulica	Karlova Ves	lykovec	841 04	Bratislava 4
Lysákova ulica	Dúbravka		841 01	Bratislava 42
Ľadová ulica	Staré Mesto	ľad	811 05	Bratislava 1
Ľaliová ulica	Ružinov	ľalia	821 05	Bratislava 2
Ľanová ulica	Ružinov	ľan	821 01	Bratislava 2
Ľubietovská ulica	Petržalka	Ľubietová	851 01	Bratislava 5
Ľubľanská ulica	Nové Mesto	Ľubľana	831 02	Bratislava 3
Ľubochnianska ulica	Nové Mesto	Ľubochňa	831 04	Bratislava 3
Ľubovnianska ulica	Petržalka	Stará Ľubovňa	851 07	Bratislava 5
Ľubovníková ulica	Devínska Nová Ves	ľubovník	841 07, 08	Bratislava 49
Madáchova ulica	Podunajské Biskupice	Imre Madách	821 06	Bratislava 214
Maďarská ulica	Rusovce	Maďarsko	851 10	Bratislava 59
Magnetová ulica	Nové Mesto	magnet	831 04	Bratislava 3
Magnezitová ulica	Devínska Nová Ves	magnezit	841 07	Bratislava 49
Magnóliová ulica	Vrakuňa	magnólia	821 07	Bratislava 214
Magurská ulica	Nové Mesto	Magura	831 01	Bratislava 37
Macharova ulica	Petržalka	Josef Svatopluk Machar	851 01	Bratislava 5
Máchova ulica	Podunajské Biskupice	Karel Hynek Mácha	821 06	Bratislava 214
Majakovského ulica	Staré Mesto	Vladimir Vladimirovič Majakovskij	811 04	Bratislava 1
Majerníkova ulica	Karlova Ves	Cyprián Majerník	841 05	Bratislava 4
Majerská ulica	Vrakuňa	majer	821 07	Bratislava 214
Májkova ulica	Staré Mesto	Jozef Májek	811 07	Bratislava 1
Majoránová ulica	Vrakuňa	majorán	821 07	Bratislava 214
Májová ulica	Petržalka	máj	851 01	Bratislava 5
Maková ulica	Vrakuňa	mak	821 07	Bratislava 214
Makovického ulica	Nové Mesto	Dušan Makovický	831 03	Bratislava 3
Malá ulica	Staré Mesto	veľkosť	811 02	Bratislava 1
Malagová ulica	Nové Mesto			
Malé pálenisko	Ružinov		821 05	Bratislava 2
Malinová ulica	Staré Mesto	malina	811 04	Bratislava 1
Malodunajská ulica	Vrakuňa	Malý Dunaj	821 07	Bratislava 214
Málová ulica	Záhorská Bystrica		841 06	Bratislava 48
Malý trh	Staré Mesto	trh	811 08	Bratislava 1
Mamateyova ulica	Petržalka	Albert Pavol Mamatey	851 03, 04	Bratislava 5
Mandľová ulica	Jarovce	mandľa	851 10	Bratislava 59
Mandľovníková ulica	Nové Mesto	mandľovník	831 01	Bratislava 37
Margarétová ulica	Vrakuňa	margaréta	821 07	Bratislava 214
Marhuľová ulica	Vrakuňa	marhuľa	821 07	Bratislava 214
Mariánska ulica	Staré Mesto		811 08	Bratislava 1
Markova ulica	Petržalka		851 01	Bratislava 5
Marótyho ulica	Staré Mesto	Ľudovít Márothy	811 06	Bratislava 1
Martákovej ulica	Ružinov	Mária Rázusová-Martáková	821 03	Bratislava 2
Martinčekova ulica	Ružinov		821 01, 09	Bratislava 2
Martinengova ulica	Staré Mesto	Ferdinand Martinengo	811 02	Bratislava 1
Martinská ulica	Ružinov	Martin	821 05	Bratislava 2
Matejkova ulica	Karlova Ves	Peter Matejka	841 05	Bratislava 4
Matičná ulica	Nové Mesto	Matica slovenská	831 03	Bratislava 3
Matúškova ulica	Nové Mesto	Janko Matúška	831 01	Bratislava 37
Matúšova ulica	Staré Mesto		811 02, 04	Bratislava 1
Mečíková ulica	Devínska Nová Ves	mečík	841 07	Bratislava 49
Medená ulica	Staré Mesto	meď	811 02	Bratislava 1
Medová ulica	Devín	med	841 10	Bratislava 49
Medzierka	Staré Mesto	medzera	811 01	Bratislava 1
Medzilaborecká ulica	Ružinov	Medzilaborce	821 01	Bratislava 2
Merlotová ulica	Nové Mesto	merlot	831 02	Bratislava 3
Mesačná ulica	Ružinov	mesiac	821 02	Bratislava 2
Mestská ulica	Nové Mesto	mesto	831 03	Bratislava 3
Meteorová ulica	Ružinov	meteor	821 02	Bratislava 2
Metodova ulica	Ružinov	svätý Metod	821 08	Bratislava 2
Mickiewiczova ulica	Staré Mesto	Adam Mickiewicz	811 07	Bratislava 1
Mierová ulica	Ružinov	mier	821 05	Bratislava 2
Michalská ulica	Staré Mesto	sv. Michal	811 03	Bratislava 1
Micherova zátoka	Ružinov			
Mikovíniho ulica	Ružinov	Samuel Mikovíni	831 02	Bratislava 3
Mikulášska ulica	Staré Mesto	Chrám svätého Mikuláša	811 01	Bratislava 1
Miletičova ulica	Ružinov	Svetozar Miletić	821 08, 09	Bratislava 2
Mínešská ulica	Rusovce	majer Míneš	851 10	Bratislava 59
Mišíkova ulica	Staré Mesto		811 04, 06	Bratislava 1
Mládežnícka ulica	Devín	mládež	841 10	Bratislava 49
Mliekárenská ulica	Ružinov	mliekáreň	821 09	Bratislava 2
Mlynarovičova ulica	Petržalka	Miloš Klement Mlynarovič	851 03	Bratislava 5
Mlynská ulica	Devínska Nová Ves	mlyn	841 07	Bratislava 49
Mlynská dolina	Karlova Ves, Staré Mesto	Mlynská dolina	811 02, 04, 841 04	Bratislava 1, 4
Mlynské luhy	Ružinov	Mlynské rameno	821 05	Bratislava 2
Mlynské nivy	Ružinov		811 09, 821 05, 9	Bratislava 1, 2
Mlyny	Karlova Ves	mlyn	841 04	Bratislava 4
Modranská ulica	Nové Mesto	Modra	831 02	Bratislava 3
Modricová ulica	Vrakuňa	Modrica	821 07	Bratislava 214
Modrý chodník	Rača		831 06	Bratislava 35
Mojmírova ulica	Ružinov	Mojmír I.	821 08	Bratislava 2
Mokráň záhon	Ružinov		821 04	Bratislava 2
Mokrohájska cesta	Karlova Ves		841 04	Bratislava 4
Moldavská ulica	Ružinov	Moldavsko	821 03	Bratislava 2
Molecova ulica	Karlova Ves	Daniel Molec	841 04	Bratislava 4
Monardová ulica	Podunajské Biskupice		821 06	Bratislava 214
Moravská ulica	Nové Mesto	Morava	831 03	Bratislava 3
Morušová ulica	Jarovce	moruša	851 10	Bratislava 59
Moskovská ulica	Staré Mesto	Moskva	811 08	Bratislava 1
Most Apollo	Ružinov, Petržalka	most Apollo		
Most Lafranconi	Karlova Ves, Petržalka	most Lafranconi		
Most SNP	Staré mesto, Petržalka	most SNP		
Mostná ulica	Vrakuňa	most	821 07	Bratislava 214
Mostová ulica	Staré Mesto	most	811 02	Bratislava 1
Mošovského ulica	Staré Mesto	Jur Tesák Mošovský	811 03	Bratislava 1
Motýlia ulica	Ružinov	motýle	821 05	Bratislava 2
Moyšova ulica	Dúbravka	Ladislav Moyš	841 02	Bratislava 42
Moyzesova ulica	Staré Mesto	Štefan Moyzes	811 05	Bratislava 1
Mozartova ulica	Staré Mesto	Wolfgang Amadeus Mozart	811 02	Bratislava 1
Mramorová ulica	Podunajské Biskupice	mramor	821 06	Bratislava 214
Mraziarenská ulica	Ružinov	Mraziarne n. p.	821 08	Bratislava 2
Mrázová ulica	Rača		831 06	Bratislava 35
Mudrochova ulica	Rača	Ján Mudroch	831 06	Bratislava 35
Mudroňova ulica	Staré Mesto	Ján Mudroň	811 03	Bratislava 1
Muránska ulica	Devín	Muráň	841 10	Bratislava 49
Murgašova ulica	Staré Mesto	Jozef Murgaš	811 04	Bratislava 1
Muškátová ulica	Ružinov	muškát	821 01	Bratislava 2
Muštová ulica	Nové Mesto	mušt	831 02	Bratislava 3
Múzejná ulica	Staré Mesto	múzeum	811 02	Bratislava 1
Myjavská ulica	Staré Mesto	Myjava	811 03	Bratislava 1
Mýtna ulica	Staré Mesto	mýto	811 05, 7	Bratislava 1
Na Baránku	Staré Mesto	Baránok	811 04	Bratislava 1
Na barine	Lamač	barina	841 03	Bratislava 42
Na Brezinách	Staré Mesto		811 05	Bratislava 1
Na doline	Vajnory	Dolina	831 07	Bratislava 36
Na Grbe	Devínska Nová Ves	Grba	841 07	Bratislava 49
Na Grunte	Nové Mesto			
Na Holom vrchu	Záhorská Bystrica	Holý vrch	841 06	Bratislava 48
Na hrádzi	Čunovo	hrádza	851 10	Bratislava 59
Na Hrebienku	Staré Mesto		811 02	Bratislava 1
Na hriadkach	Devínska Nová Ves	hriadky	841 07	Bratislava 49
Na jarku	Vajnory	jarok	831 07	Bratislava 36
Na Kalvárii	Staré Mesto	Kalvária	811 04	Bratislava 1
Na Kampárke	Karlova Ves		841 04	Bratislava 4
Na kaštieli	Devínska Nová Ves	kaštieľ	841 07	Bratislava 49
Na kopci	Staré Mesto		811 02	Bratislava 1
Na Krčoch	Záhorská Bystrica	Krče	841 06	Bratislava 48
Na križovatkách	Ružinov	križovatky	821 04	Bratislava 2
Na lánoch	Ružinov	lán	821 04	Bratislava 2
Na medzi	Rača	medza	831 06	Bratislava 35
Na Mýte	Devínska Nová Ves	mýto	841 07	Bratislava 49
Na pántoch	Rača, Vajnory		831 06	Bratislava 35
Na pasekách	Rača	paseka	831 06	Bratislava 35
Na paši	Ružinov	paša	821 02	Bratislava 2
Na Pažiti	Nové Mesto	Pažiť	831 01	Bratislava 37
Na piesku	Ružinov	piesok	821 05	Bratislava 2
Na Revíne	Nové Mesto	Revín	831 01	Bratislava 37
Na Riviére	Karlova Ves	Riviéra	841 04	Bratislava 4
Na rozhliadke	Nové Mesto	rozhliadka	831 01	Bratislava 37
Na Sitine	Karlova Ves	Sitina	841 04	Bratislava 4
Na skale	Devínska Nová Ves	skala	841 07	Bratislava 49
Na Slanci	Nové Mesto	Slanec		
Na Slavíne	Staré Mesto	Slavín	811 06	Bratislava 1
Na Spojke	Nové Mesto		831 01	Bratislava 37
Na stráni	Staré Mesto	stráň	811 04	Bratislava 1
Na Štyridsiatku	Staré Mesto	číslo štyridsať	811 06	Bratislava 1
Na úvrati	Ružinov	úvrať	821 04	Bratislava 2
Na varte	Nové Mesto		831 01	Bratislava 37
Na Vlkovkách	Záhorská Bystrica		841 06	Bratislava 48
Na vrátkach	Dúbravka		841 01	Bratislava 42
Na vŕšku	Staré Mesto	vŕšok	811 01	Bratislava 1
Na vyhliadke	Devínska Nová Ves	vyhliadka	841 07	Bratislava 49
Na výslní	Ružinov	výslnie	821 05	Bratislava 2
Na Zlatej nohe	Nové Mesto		831 01	Bratislava 37
Nábělkova ulica	Karlova Ves	Ludvík Nábělek	841 05	Bratislava 4
Nábrežie arm. gen. Ludvíka Svobodu	Staré Mesto	Ludvík Svoboda	811 02	Bratislava 1
Nábrežie Ľubomíra Kadnára	Karlova Ves	Ľubomír Kadnár		
Nábrežie Milana Rastislava Štefánika	Ružinov	Milan Rastislav Štefánik		
Nábrežná ulica	Petržalka	nábrežie	851 01	Bratislava 5
Nad Dunajom	Karlova Ves	Dunaj	841 04	Bratislava 4
Nad Gronárom	Devín	Gronáre (Koruny)	841 10	Bratislava 49
Nad jazierkom	Vajnory	jazero	831 07	Bratislava 36
Nad kúriou	Rača	kúria	831 06	Bratislava 35
Nad lomom	Staré Mesto	lom	811 02	Bratislava 1
Nad lúčkami	Karlova Ves	lúčky	841 04, 05	Bratislava 4
Nad ostrovom	Karlova Ves	ostrov	841 04	Bratislava 4
Nad Sihoťou	Karlova Ves	Sihoť	841 04	Bratislava 4
Nad Válkom	Vajnory		831 07	Bratislava 36
Nákovná ulica	Podunajské Biskupice	nákova	821 06	Bratislava 214
Nákupná ulica	Podunajské Biskupice	nákup	821 06	Bratislava 214
Narcisová ulica	Ružinov	narcis	821 01	Bratislava 2
Nedbalova ulica	Staré Mesto	Oskar Nedbal	811 01	Bratislava 1
Nechtíková ulica	Vrakuňa	Nechtík lekársky	821 07	Bratislava 214
Nejedlého ulica	Dúbravka	Zdeněk Nejedlý	841 02	Bratislava 42
Nekrasovova ulica	Staré Mesto		811 04	Bratislava 1
Nemčíkova ulica	Dúbravka		841 01	Bratislava 42
Neronetová ulica	Nové Mesto	neronet	831 02	Bratislava 3
Nerudova ulica	Ružinov	Jan Neruda	821 04	Bratislava 2
Nevädzová ulica	Ružinov	nevädza	821 01	Bratislava 2
Nevská ulica	Záhorská Bystrica	Neva	841 06	Bratislava 48
Nezábudková ulica	Ružinov	nezábudka	821 01	Bratislava 2
Nezvalova ulica	Podunajské Biskupice	Vítězslav Nezval	821 06	Bratislava 214
Niťová ulica	Ružinov	niť	821 08	Bratislava 2
Nitrianska ulica	Ružinov	Nitra	821 08	Bratislava 2
Nížinná ulica	Ružinov	nížina	821 05	Bratislava 2
Nobelova ulica	Nové Mesto	Alfred Nobel	831 02	Bratislava 3
Nová ulica	Nové Mesto		831 01	Bratislava 3
Nová Bellova ulica	Nové Mesto	Ján Levoslav Bella	831 01	Bratislava 37
Nová Rožňavská	Nové Mesto	Rožňava	831 04	Bratislava 3
Nová tržnica	Nové Mesto			
Novackého ulica	Karlova Ves		841 04	Bratislava 4
Nové pálenisko	Ružinov		821 05	Bratislava 2
Nové záhrady I.	Ružinov	záhrada	821 05	Bratislava 2
Nové záhrady II.	Ružinov		821 05	Bratislava 2
Nové záhrady III.	Ružinov		821 05	Bratislava 2
Nové záhrady IV.	Ružinov		821 05	Bratislava 2
Nové záhrady V.	Ružinov		821 05	Bratislava 2
Nové záhrady VI.	Ružinov		821 05	Bratislava 2
Nové záhrady VII.	Ružinov		821 05	Bratislava 2
Novinárska ulica	Nové Mesto	novinár	831 03	Bratislava 3
Novobanská ulica	Petržalka	Nová Baňa	851 01	Bratislava 5
Novodvorská ulica	Dúbravka	Nový dvor	841 01	Bratislava 42
Novohorská ulica	Rača	Nová hora	831 06	Bratislava 35
Novohradská ulica	Ružinov	Novohrad	821 09	Bratislava 2
Novosadná ulica	Čunovo	Novy Sad	851 10	Bratislava 59
Novosvetská ulica	Staré Mesto		811 04, 06	Bratislava 1
Novoveská ulica	Devínska Nová Ves	Bratislava – mestská časť Devínska Nová Ves	841 07	Bratislava 49
Nový kameňolom	Devín	kameňolom		Bratislava 49
Nový záhon	Rača	záhon		
Obežná ulica	Ružinov	obežnica	821 02	Bratislava 2
Obchodná ulica	Staré Mesto	obchod	811 06	Bratislava 1
Obilná ulica	Ružinov	obilie		
Oblačná ulica	Rača	oblaky	831 06	Bratislava 35
Oblúková ulica	Podunajské Biskupice	oblúk	821 06	Bratislava 214
Očovská ulica	Petržalka	Očová	851 02	Bratislava 5
Odborárska ulica	Nové Mesto	odbory	831 02	Bratislava 3
Odeská ulica	Podunajské Biskupice	Odesa	821 06	Bratislava 214
Okánikova ulica	Staré Mesto	Ľudovít Okánik	811 04	Bratislava 1
Okružná ulica	Ružinov	okruh	821 04	Bratislava 2
Olbrachtova ulica	Nové Mesto	Ivan Olbracht	831 04	Bratislava 3
Oleandrová ulica	Jarovce	oleander	851 10	Bratislava 59
Olejkárska ulica	Staré Mesto	olejkár	811 09	Bratislava 1
Olivová ulica	Nové Mesto	oliva	831 01	Bratislava 37
Olšová ulica	Rača	olša	831 06	Bratislava 35
Ondavská ulica	Ružinov	Ondava	821 08	Bratislava 2
Ondrejovova ulica	Ružinov	Ľudo Ondrejov	821 03	Bratislava 2
Ondrejská ulica	Rača	Ondrej	831 06	Bratislava 35
Opálová ulica	Jarovce	opál	851 10	Bratislava 59
Opavská ulica	Nové Mesto	Opava	831 01	Bratislava 37
Opletalova ulica	Devínska Nová Ves	Jan Opletal	841 07	Bratislava 49
Oplotené koľajište	Devínska Nová Ves			Bratislava 49
Oráčska ulica	Rača	oráč	831 06	Bratislava 35
Oravská ulica	Ružinov	Orava	821 09	Bratislava 2
Orechová ulica	Podunajské Biskupice	orech	821 06	Bratislava 214
Orechová cesta	Petržalka	orech	851 04	Bratislava 5
Orechový rad	Ružinov	orech	821 05	Bratislava 2
Orenburská ulica	Podunajské Biskupice	Orenburg	821 06	Bratislava 214
Orgovánová ulica	Vrakuňa	orgován	821 07	Bratislava 214
Orchideová ulica	Vrakuňa	orchidea	821 07	Bratislava 214
Oriešková ulica	Ružinov		821 05	Bratislava 2
Orlia ulica	Karlova Ves	orol		
Ormisova ulica	Nové Mesto		831 02	Bratislava 3
Osadná ulica	Nové Mesto	osada	831 03	Bratislava 3
Osijecká ulica	Jarovce	Osijek	851 10	Bratislava 59
Osiková ulica	Vrakuňa	osika	821 07	Bratislava 214
Oskorušová ulica	Dúbravka	oskoruša	841 01	Bratislava 42
Osloboditeľská ulica	Vajnory	osloboditelia	831 07	Bratislava 36
Ostravská ulica	Staré Mesto	Ostrava	811 04	Bratislava 1
Ostredková ulica	Ružinov	Ostredky	821 02	Bratislava 2
Ostružinová ulica	Vrakuňa	ostružina	821 07	Bratislava 214
Ostružinový chodník	Dúbravka	ostružina	841 03	Bratislava 42
Osuského ulica	Petržalka	Štefan Osuský	851 03	Bratislava 5
Osvetová ulica	Ružinov	osveta	821 05	Bratislava 2
Ostriežová ulica	Záhorská Bystrica	ostriež	841 06	Bratislava 48
Otonelská ulica	Nové Mesto	otonel	831 02	Bratislava 3
Ovčiarska ulica	Podunajské Biskupice	ovčiarstvo	821 06	Bratislava 214
Ovocná ulica	Jarovce	ovocie	851 10	Bratislava 59
Ovručská ulica	Nové Mesto	Ovruč	831 02	Bratislava 3
Ovsená ulica	Čunovo	ovos	851 10	Bratislava 59
Ožvoldíkova ulica	Dúbravka	Karol Ožvoldík	841 02	Bratislava 42
Ôsma ulica	Nové Mesto	číslo 8	831 01	Bratislava 37
Pajštúnska ulica	Petržalka	Pajštún	851 02	Bratislava 5
Palackého ulica	Staré Mesto	František Palacký	811 02	Bratislava 1
Pálavská ulica	Nové Mesto	pálava	831 02	Bratislava 3
Palárikova ulica	Staré Mesto	Ján Palárik	811 04	Bratislava 1
Palinová ulica	Vrakuňa	palina	821 07	Bratislava 214
Palisády	Staré Mesto	palisády	811 01, 03, 06	Bratislava 1
Palkovičova ulica	Ružinov	Juraj Palkovič	821 08	Bratislava 2
Palmová ulica	Jarovce	palma	851 10	Bratislava 59
Panenská ulica	Staré Mesto	panna	811 03	Bratislava 1
Pankúchova ulica	Petržalka	Ján Pankúch	851 04	Bratislava 5
Panónska cesta	Petržalka	Panónia	851 04	Bratislava 5
Panská ulica	Staré Mesto	aristokracia	811 01	Bratislava 1
Pántikova ulica	Dúbravka	Július Pántik	841 01	Bratislava 42
Papraďová ulica	Ružinov	papraď	821 01	Bratislava 2
Parcelná ulica	Podunajské Biskupice	parcela	821 06	Bratislava 214
Parenicová ulica	Podunajské Biskupice	parenica	821 06	Bratislava 214
Páričkova ulica	Ružinov	Ján Párička	821 08	Bratislava 2
Park Andreja Hlinku	Ružinov	Andrej Hlinka		
Park Ferdiša Jurigu	Vajnory	Ferdinand Juriga		
Park Jozefa Miloslava Hurbana	Rača	Jozef Miloslav Hurban		
Park pod lipami	Vajnory	lipa		
Parková ulica	Ružinov	park	821 05	Bratislava 2
Párna ulica	Ružinov	párne číslo		
Partizánska ulica	Staré Mesto	partizán	811 03	Bratislava 1
Pasienková ulica	Podunajské Biskupice	pasienok	821 06	Bratislava 214
Pastierska ulica	Rača	pastier	831 06	Bratislava 35
Paulínyho ulica	Staré Mesto	Viliam Pauliny-Tóth	811 02	Bratislava 1
Pavlovičova ulica	Ružinov	Alexander Pavlovič	821 04	Bratislava 2
Pavlovova ulica	Ružinov	Ivan Petrovič Pavlov	821 08	Bratislava 2
Pavlovská ulica	Nové Mesto		831 03	Bratislava 3
Pažického ulica	Staré Mesto		811 06	Bratislava 1
Pažítková ulica	Ružinov	pažítka	821 01	Bratislava 2
Pečnianska ulica	Petržalka	Pečňa	851 01	Bratislava 5
Pekná cesta	Nové Mesto, Rača	krása	831 52, 54	Bratislava 34
Pekná vyhliadka	Nové Mesto		831 01	Bratislava 37
Pekníkova ulica	Dúbravka	Karol Pekník	841 02	Bratislava 42
Perličková ulica	Podunajské Biskupice		821 06	Bratislava 214
Pernecká ulica	Karlova Ves	Pernek	841 04	Bratislava 4
Pestovateľská ulica	Ružinov	pestovateľ	821 04	Bratislava 2
Peterská ulica	Ružinov		821 03	Bratislava 2
Petöfiho ulica	Podunajské Biskupice	Sándor Petőfi	821 06	Bratislava 214
Petržalská ulica	Čunovo	Petržalka	851 10	Bratislava 59
Petzvalova ulica	Ružinov	Jozef Maximilián Pecval	821 03	Bratislava 2
Pezinská ulica	Nové Mesto	Pezinok	831 02	Bratislava 3
Piata ulica	Nové Mesto	číslo 5	831 01	Bratislava 37
Piesková ulica	Rača	piesok	831 06	Bratislava 35
Pieskovcová ulica	Devínska Nová Ves	pieskovec	841 07	Bratislava 49
Piesočná ulica	Ružinov	piesok	821 04	Bratislava 2
Piešťanská ulica	Nové Mesto	Piešťany	831 02	Bratislava 3
Pifflova ulica	Petržalka	Alfréd Piffl	851 01	Bratislava 5
Pilárikova ulica	Staré Mesto	Štefan Pilárik	811 03	Bratislava 1
Pílová ulica	Jarovce	píla	851 10	Bratislava 59
Píniová ulica	Vrakuňa	pínia	821 07	Bratislava 214
Pionierska ulica	Nové Mesto	pionieri	831 02	Bratislava 3
Pivonková ulica	Ružinov	pivonka	821 01	Bratislava 2
Plachého ulica	Dúbravka		840 02, 841 02	Bratislava 42
Planckova ulica	Petržalka	Max Planck	851 01	Bratislava 5
Plánky	Záhorská Bystrica	plánka	840 02	Bratislava 42
Platanová ulica	Vrakuňa	platan	821 07	Bratislava 214
Plátenícka ulica	Ružinov	plátenník	821 09	Bratislava 2
Plavecká ulica	Záhorská Bystrica		841 06	Bratislava 48
Plickova ulica	Rača	Vladimír Plicka	831 06	Bratislava 35
Plitvická ulica	Jarovce	Plitvice	851 10	Bratislava 59
Pluhová ulica	Nové Mesto	pluh	831 03	Bratislava 3
Plynárenská ulica	Ružinov	plynáreň	821 09	Bratislava 2
Plzenská ulica	Nové Mesto	Plzeň	831 03	Bratislava 3
Pobrežná ulica	Petržalka	pobrežie	851 01	Bratislava 5
Pod agátmi	Vrakuňa	agát	821 07	Bratislava 214
Pod Bôrikom	Staré Mesto	Bôrik (vrch v Bratislave)	811 02	Bratislava 1
Pod brehmi	Dúbravka	breh	841 03	Bratislava 42
Pod gaštanmi	Ružinov	gaštan	821 07	Bratislava 214
Pod Glavicou	Devínska Nová Ves	Glavica		Bratislava 49
Pod Kalváriou	Staré Mesto	Kalvária		
Pod Klepáčom	Nové Mesto	Klepáč	831 01	Bratislava 37
Pod Kobylou	Devín	Devínska Kobyla	841 10	Bratislava 4
Pod Krásnou Hôrkou	Nové Mesto	Krásna Hôrka (vrch v Bratislave)	831 01	Bratislava 37
Pod krížom	Vajnory	kríž	831 07	Bratislava 36
Pod lesom	Karlova Ves	les	841 04	Bratislava 4
Pod lipami	Vajnory	lipa	831 07	Bratislava 36
Pod Lipovým	Devínska Nová Ves		841 07	Bratislava 49
Pod násypom	Lamač	násyp	841 03	Bratislava 42
Pod Rovnicami	Karlova Ves	Rovnice	841 04	Bratislava 4
Pod skalou	Devín	skala	841 10	Bratislava 49
Pod Strážami	Nové Mesto	Stráže	831 01	Bratislava 37
Pod Vachmajstrom	Nové Mesto	Vachmajster	831 01	Bratislava 37
Pod Válkom	Vajnory		831 07	Bratislava 36
Pod vinicami	Staré Mesto	vinica	811 02	Bratislava 1
Pod vinicami	Staré Mesto	vinica	811 02	Bratislava 1
Pod Vtáčnikom	Vinohrady	Pod Vtáčnikom	831 01	Bratislava
Pod Zečákom	Lamač	Zečák	841 03	Bratislava 42
Podbeľová ulica	Vrakuňa	podbeľ	821 07	Bratislava 214
Podbrezovská ulica	Rača	Podbrezová	831 06	Bratislava 35
Podháj	Lamač		841 03	Bratislava 42
Podhorská ulica	Devínska Nová Ves	hora	841 07	Bratislava 49
Podhorského ulica	Staré Mesto		811 04	Bratislava 1
Podjavorinskej ulica	Staré Mesto	Ľudmila Podjavorinská	811 03	Bratislava 1
Podjazd	Staré Mesto	podjazd		
Podkarpatská ulica	Rača	Karpaty	831 06	Bratislava 35
Podkolibská ulica	Nové Mesto	Koliba	831 01	Bratislava 37
Podkorunská ulica	Devín		841 10	Bratislava 49
Podlesná ulica	Lamač	les	841 03	Bratislava 42
Podlučinského ulica	Ružinov	Andrej Hvizdák Podlučinský	821 03	Bratislava 2
Podniková ulica	Nové Mesto	podnik	831 02	Bratislava 3
Podpriehradná ulica	Vrakuňa	priehrada	821 07	Bratislava 214
Podtatranského ulica	Staré Mesto		811 05	Bratislava 1
Podunajská ulica	Podunajské Biskupice, Vrakuňa	Dunaj	821 06, 07	Bratislava 214
Podzáhradná ulica	Podunajské Biskupice	záhrada	821 06, 07	Bratislava 214
Pohronská ulica	Nové Mesto	Pohronie	831 03	Bratislava 3
Polárna ulica	Ružinov	pól	821 02	Bratislava 2
Polereckého ulica	Petržalka	Ján Ladislav Polerecký	851 04	Bratislava 5
Polianky	Dúbravka		841 01	Bratislava 42
Poľná ulica	Staré Mesto	pole	811 08	Bratislava 1
Poľnohospodárska ulica	Vrakuňa	poľnohospodárstvo	821 07	Bratislava 214
Poľovnícka ulica	Ružinov	poľovníctvo		
Poľská ulica	Staré Mesto	Poľsko	811 07	Bratislava 1
Poludníková ulica	Ružinov	poludník	821 02	Bratislava 2
Poniklecová ulica	Devínska Nová Ves	poniklec	841 07	Bratislava 49
Popolná ulica	Rača	popol	831 06	Bratislava 35
Popovova ulica	Dúbravka		841 01	Bratislava 42
Popradská ulica	Podunajské Biskupice	Poprad	821 06	Bratislava 214
Porubského ulica	Staré Mesto		811 06	Bratislava 1
Poštová ulica	Staré Mesto	pošta	811 06	Bratislava 1
Potočná ulica	Rača	potok	831 06	Bratislava 35
Považanova ulica	Dúbravka		841 02	Bratislava 42
Považská ulica	Nové Mesto	Považie	831 03	Bratislava 3
Povoznícka ulica	Lamač	povozník	841 03	Bratislava 42
Povraznícka ulica	Staré Mesto	povrazníctvo	811 05, 07	Bratislava 1
Požiarnická ulica	Podunajské Biskupice	požiarnik	821 06	Bratislava 214
Pračanská ulica	Vajnory	Prača	831 07	Bratislava 36
Prasličková ulica	Vrakuňa	praslička	821 07	Bratislava 214
Prašná ulica	Ružinov	prach		
Pražská ulica	Nové Mesto, Staré Mesto	Prague	811 04, 831 01	Bratislava 1, 37
Prepoštská ulica	Staré Mesto	prepošt	811 01	Bratislava 1
Prešernova ulica	Staré Mesto	France Prešeren	811 02	Bratislava 1
Prešovská ulica	Ružinov	Prešov	821 02, 08	Bratislava 2
Pri Bielom kríži	Nové Mesto	biely kríž	831 02	Bratislava 3
Pri Čiernom lese	Ružinov	Čierny les		
Pri Dunaji	Rusovce	Dunaj		
Pri dvore	Nové Mesto	dvor	831 04	Bratislava 3
Pri Dynamitke	Nové Mesto	Dynamitka	831 03	Bratislava 3
Pri gaštanovej aleji	Rusovce		851 10	Bratislava 59
Pri Habánskom mlyne	Staré Mesto	Habáni	811 04	Bratislava 1
Pri hradnej studni	Staré Mesto		811 03	Bratislava 1
Pri Hrubej lúke	Dúbravka	Hrubá lúka	841 02	Bratislava 42
Pri hrádzi	Podunajské Biskupice	hrádza	821 06	Bratislava 214
Pri kolíske	Rača	kolíska	831 06	Bratislava 35
Pri kríži	Dúbravka	kríž	841 02	Bratislava 42
Pri mlyne	Vajnory	mlyn	831 07	Bratislava 36
Pri pasienku	Vajnory	pasienok	831 07	Bratislava 36
Pri pastierni	Vajnory	pastiereň	831 07	Bratislava 36
Pri seči	Petržalka	seč	851 01	Bratislava 5
Pri starej prachárni	Nové Mesto	Pušný prach	831 04	Bratislava 3
Pri Starom háji	Petržalka	Starý háj		
Pri starom letisku	Vajnory	Letisko Vajnory	831 07	Bratislava 36
Pri starom mýte	Nové Mesto	mýto	831 04	Bratislava 3
Pri strelnici	Ružinov	strelnica	821 04	Bratislava 2
Pri Struhe	Vajnory	Struha	831 07	Bratislava 36
Pri Suchom mlyne	Staré Mesto		811 04	Bratislava 1
Pri Šajbách	Rača	Šajby	831 06	Bratislava 35
Pri šanci	Vajnory		831 07	Bratislava 36
Pri štadióne	Dúbravka	štadión	841 01	Bratislava 42
Pri tehelni	Jarovce	tehelňa	851 10	Bratislava 59
Pri trati	Podunajské Biskupice	trať	821 06	Bratislava 214
Pri Vápenickom potoku	Záhorská Bystrica	Vápenický potok	841 06	Bratislava 48
Pri vinohradoch	Rača	vinohrad	831 06	Bratislava 35
Pri vodnej veži	Rusovce	vodná veža	851 10	Bratislava 59
Pri zvonici	Ružinov	zvonica	821 04	Bratislava 2
Pri žrebčíne	Jarovce	žrebčín	851 10	Bratislava 59
Pribinova ulica	Ružinov, Staré Mesto	Pribina	811 09, 821 09	Bratislava 2
Pribišova ulica	Karlova Ves		841 05	Bratislava 4
Pribylinská ulica	Rača	Pribylina	831 04	Bratislava 3
Pridánky	Lamač		841 03	Bratislava 42
Prídavkova ulica	Záhorská Bystrica	Peter Prídavok	841 06	Bratislava 48
Priečna ulica	Nové Mesto		831 03	Bratislava 3
Priehradná ulica	Vrakuňa	priehrada	821 07	Bratislava 214
Priekopnícka ulica	Podunajské Biskupice	priekopník	821 06	Bratislava 214
Priekopy	Ružinov	priekopa	821 08	Bratislava 2
Priemyselná ulica	Ružinov	priemysel	821 08, 09	Bratislava 2
Prievozská ulica	Ružinov	Prievoz	821 05, 09	Bratislava 2
Príjazdná ulica	Vajnory	príjazd	831 07	Bratislava 36
Príkopova ulica	Nové Mesto		831 03	Bratislava 3
Prímoravská ulica	Devínska Nová Ves	Morava	841 07	Bratislava 49
Prípojná ulica	Podunajské Biskupice		821 06	Bratislava 214
Prístavná ulica	Ružinov	prístav	821 09	Bratislava 2
Prístavný most	Ružinov, Petržalka	prístav		
Prokofievova ulica	Petržalka	Sergej Sergejevič Prokofiev	851 01	Bratislava 5
Prokopova ulica	Petržalka	Filip Jakub Prokop	851 01	Bratislava 5
Prúdová ulica	Ružinov	prúd	821 05	Bratislava 2
Prvá ulica	Nové Mesto	číslo 1	831 01	Bratislava 37
Prvosienková ulica	Staré Mesto	prvosienka	811 02	Bratislava 1
Pšeničná ulica	Podunajské Biskupice	pšenica	821 06	Bratislava 214
Púchovská ulica	Rača, Vajnory	Púchov	831 06	Bratislava 35
Púpavová ulica	Karlova Ves	púpava	841 04	Bratislava 4
Pustá ulica	Karlova Ves		841 04	Bratislava 4
Puškinova ulica	Staré Mesto	Alexandr Sergejevič Puškin	811 04	Bratislava 1
Pútnická ulica	Záhorská Bystrica	pútnické miesto	841 06	Bratislava 48
Pyrenejská ulica	Nové Mesto	Pyreneje	831 01	Bratislava 37
Rácova ulica	Lamač	Ján Rác	841 03	Bratislava 42
Račianska ulica	Nové Mesto, Rača	Rača	831 02, 06	Bratislava 3, 35
Račianske mýto	Nové Mesto	Rača a mýto	831 02	Bratislava 3
Radarová ulica	Ružinov	radar	821 02	Bratislava 2
Rádiová ulica	Ružinov	rádio	821 04	Bratislava 2
Radlinského ulica	Staré Mesto	Andrej Ľudovít Radlinský	811 07	Bratislava 1
Radničná ulica	Staré Mesto	radnica	811 01	Bratislava 1
Radvanská ulica	Staré Mesto	Radvaň	811 01	Bratislava 1
Rajčianska ulica	Vrakuňa	Rajčanka	821 07	Bratislava 214
Rajecká ulica	Vrakuňa	Rajec	821 07	Bratislava 214
Rajská ulica	Staré Mesto	raj	811 08	Bratislava 1
Rajtákova ulica	Lamač	Július Rajták	841 03	Bratislava 42
Raketová ulica	Ružinov	raketa	821 02	Bratislava 2
Rákosová ulica	Ružinov	rákosie	821 05	Bratislava 2
Rakytníková ulica	Čunovo	rakytník	851 10	Bratislava 59
Rapošov park	Ružinov			
Rascová ulica	Vrakuňa	rasca	821 07	Bratislava 214
Rastislavova ulica	Ružinov	Rastislav	821 08	Bratislava 2
Rastlinná ulica	Jarovce	rastliny	851 10	Bratislava 59
Ráztočná ulica	Vrakuňa		821 07	Bratislava 214
Rázusovo nábrežie	Staré Mesto	Martin Rázus	811 02	Bratislava 1
Ražná ulica	Čunovo	raž	851 10	Bratislava 59
Rebarborová ulica	Vrakuňa	rebarbora	821 07	Bratislava 214
Rebríčková ulica	Čunovo	rebríček	851 10	Bratislava 59
Regrútska ulica	Vajnory	regrút	831 06	Bratislava 35
Remeselnícka ulica	Rača	remeselník	831 06	Bratislava 35
Repašského ulica	Dúbravka		841 02	Bratislava 42
Repíková ulica	Vrakuňa	repík	821 07	Bratislava 214
Repková ulica	Jarovce	repka	851 10	Bratislava 59
Repná ulica	Ružinov	repa	821 04	Bratislava 2
Rešetkova ulica	Nové Mesto		831 03	Bratislava 3
Revolučná ulica	Ružinov	revolúcia	821 04	Bratislava 2
Révová ulica	Staré Mesto	réva	811 02	Bratislava 1
Revúcka ulica	Ružinov	Revúca	821 08	Bratislava 2
Rezedová ulica	Ružinov	rezeda	821 01	Bratislava 2
Riazanská ulica	Nové Mesto	Riazaň	831 02, 03	Bratislava 3
Ribayova ulica	Ružinov	Juraj Ribay	821 04	Bratislava 2
Ríbezľová ulica	Vrakuňa	ríbezľa	821 07	Bratislava 214
Riečna ulica	Staré Mesto	rieka	811 02	Bratislava 1
Rigeleho ulica	Staré Mesto	Alojz Rigele	811 02	Bratislava 1
Rímska ulica	Devín	Rím	841 10	Bratislava 49
Rizlingová ulica	Nové Mesto	rizling	831 02	Bratislava 3
Riznerova ulica	Staré Mesto	Ľudovít Vladimír Rizner	811 01	Bratislava 1
Robotnícka ulica	Nové Mesto	robotník	831 03	Bratislava 3
Roľnícka ulica	Vajnory	roľník	831 07	Bratislava 36
Romanova ulica	Petržalka	Štefan Boleslav Roman	851 02	Bratislava 5
Röntgenova ulica	Petržalka	Wilhelm Conrad Röntgen	851 01	Bratislava 5
Rosná ulica	Ružinov	rosa	821 05	Bratislava 2
Rostovská ulica	Rača	Rostov nad Donom	831 06	Bratislava 35
Rošického ulica	Záhorská Bystrica	Evžen Rošický	841 06	Bratislava 48
Rovná ulica	Ružinov		821 05	Bratislava 2
Rovniankova ulica	Petržalka	Peter Víťazoslav Rovnianek	851 02	Bratislava 5
Rovníková ulica	Ružinov	rovník	821 02	Bratislava 2
Royova ulica	Nové Mesto	Vladimír Roy	831 01	Bratislava 37
Rozálska ulica	Lamač	sv. Rozália	841 03	Bratislava 42
Rozmarínová ulica	Ružinov	rozmarín	821 04	Bratislava 2
Rozvodná ulica	Nové Mesto		831 01	Bratislava 37
Rožňavská ulica	Nové Mesto, Ružinov	Rožňava	821 04, 831 04	Bratislava 2, 3
Rubínová ulica	Nové Mesto	rubín		
Rubinsteinova ulica	Staré Mesto	Anton Grigorievič Rubinštejn	811 02	Bratislava 1
Rudnícka ulica	Rača	Rudník	831 06	Bratislava 35
Rulandská ulica	Rača	rulandské sivé	831 01	Bratislava 37
Rumančeková ulica	Ružinov	rumanček	821 01	Bratislava 2
Rumunská ulica	Rača	Rumunsko	831 06	Bratislava 35
Rusovská cesta	Petržalka	Rusovce	851 01	Bratislava 5
Rustaveliho ulica	Rača	Šota Rustaveli	831 06	Bratislava 35
Ružičková ulica	Ružinov	ružička	821 05	Bratislava 2
Ružinovská ulica	Ružinov	Ružinov	821 01, 02, 03	Bratislava 2
Ružomberská ulica	Ružinov	Ružomberok	821 05	Bratislava 2
Ružová dolina	Ružinov	ruža	821 09	Bratislava 2
Rybárska brána	Staré Mesto	rybár	811 01	Bratislava 1
Rybničná ulica	Vajnory	rybník	831 06, 07	Bratislava 35
Rýdziková ulica	Karlova Ves	rýdzik	841 04	Rýdziková
Rytierska ulica	Devín	rytier	841 10	Bratislava 49
Sabinovská ulica	Ružinov	Sabinov	821 02, 03	Bratislava 2
Sad Janka Kráľa	Petržalka	Janko Kráľ		
Sadmelijská ulica	Rača		831 06	Bratislava 35
Sadová ulica	Nové Mesto	sad	831 03	Bratislava 3
Samova ulica	Devínska Nová Ves	Samo	841 07	Bratislava 49
Saratovská ulica	Dúbravka	Saratov	841 02	Bratislava 42
Sartorisova ulica	Ružinov		821 08	Bratislava 2
Sasinkova ulica	Staré Mesto	František Víťazoslav Sasinek	811 08	Bratislava 1
Savignonská ulica	Nové Mesto	savignon		
Seberíniho ulica	Ružinov	Ján Seberíni	821 03	Bratislava 2
Sečovská ulica	Ružinov	Sečovce	821 02	Bratislava 2
Sedlárska ulica	Staré Mesto	sedlár	811 01	Bratislava 1
Sedmokrásková ulica	Ružinov	sedmokráska	821 01	Bratislava 2
Segnáre	Lamač	záhon Segnáre	841 03	Bratislava 42
Segnerova ulica	Karlova Ves	Ján Andrej Segner	841 04	Bratislava 4
Sekulská ulica	Karlova Ves	Sekule	841 04	Bratislava 4
Sekurisova ulica	Dúbravka	Samuel Sekuris	841 02	Bratislava 42
Sekýľska ulica	Záhorská Bystrica		841 06	Bratislava 48
Semenárska ulica	Jarovce	semenár	851 10	Bratislava 59
Semianova ulica	Nové Mesto		831 03	Bratislava 3
Semilonská ulica	Nové Mesto	semilon		
Senická ulica	Staré Mesto	Senica	811 04	Bratislava 1
Senná ulica	Ružinov	seno	821 05	Bratislava 2
Septimiova ulica	Rusovce	Septimius Severus	851 10	Bratislava 59
Schengenská ulica	Čunovo	Schengenská dohoda	851 10	Bratislava 59
Schillerova ulica	Staré Mesto	Friedrich Schiller	811 04	Bratislava 1
Schody na Klenovú	Nové Mesto	Klenová ulica		
Schody pri starej vodárni	Staré Mesto	vodáreň		
Sibírska ulica	Nové Mesto	Sibír	831 02	Bratislava 3
Siedma ulica	Staré Mesto	číslo 7	831 01	Bratislava 37
Sienkiewiczova ulica	Nové Mesto	Henryk Sienkiewicz	811 09	Bratislava 1
Silvánska ulica	Karlova Ves	silván	841 04	Bratislava 4
Sinokvetná ulica	Ružinov	sinokvet	821 05	Bratislava 2
Sitnianska ulica	Petržalka	Sitno		
Skalická cesta	Nové Mesto	Skalica	831 02	Bratislava 3
Skalná ulica	Staré Mesto	skala	811 01	Bratislava 1
Skerličova ulica	Lamač	rod Skerličovcov	841 03	Bratislava 42
Sklabinská ulica	Rača	Sklabiná	831 06	Bratislava 35
Skladištná ulica	Ružinov	skladište	821 08	Bratislava 2
Sklenárova ulica	Ružinov	Juraj Sklenár	821 09	Bratislava 2
Sklenárska ulica	Staré Mesto	sklenárstvo	811 02	Bratislava 1
Skorocelová ulica	Vrakuňa	skorocel	821 07	Bratislava 214
Skuteckého ulica	Vajnory	Dominik Skutecký	831 07	Bratislava 36
Skýcovská ulica	Čunovo	Skýcov	851 10	Bratislava 59
Sládkovičova ulica	Staré Mesto	Andrej Braxatoris Sládkovič	811 06	Bratislava 1
Sladová ulica	Ružinov	slad	821 05	Bratislava 2
Slatinská ulica	Vrakuňa	Slatina	821 07	Bratislava 214
Slavónska ulica	Jarovce	Slavónsko	851 10	Bratislava 59
Slávičie údolie	Staré Mesto	slávik	811 02	Bratislava 1
Slepá ulica	Staré Mesto		811 01	Bratislava 1
Sliačska ulica	Nové Mesto	Sliač	831 02	Bratislava 3
Sliezska ulica	Nové Mesto	Sliezsko	831 03	Bratislava 3
Slivková ulica	Ružinov	slivka	821 05	Bratislava 2
Sĺňavská ulica	Podunajské Biskupice	Sĺňava	821 06	Bratislava 214
Slnečná ulica	Nové Mesto	slnko	831 03	Bratislava 3
Slnečnicová ulica	Vrakuňa	slnečnica	821 07	Bratislava 214
Slovanská ulica	Staré Mesto	Slovania	811 07	Bratislava 1
Slovanské nábrežie	Devín	Slovania	841 10	Bratislava 49
Slovienska ulica	Devín	Slovieni	841 10	Bratislava 49
Slovinec	Devínska Nová Ves	bralo Slovinec	841 07	Bratislava 49
Slovinská ulica	Ružinov	Slovinsko	821 04	Bratislava 2
Slovnaftárska ulica	Ružinov	Slovnaft		
Slovnaftská ulica	Podunajské Biskupice	Slovnaft	821 05, 07	Bratislava 2, 214
Slowackého ulica	Ružinov	Juliusz Słowacki	821 04	Bratislava 2
Smaragdová ulica	Jarovce	smaragd	851 10	Bratislava 59
Smetanova ulica	Staré Mesto	Bedřich Smetana	811 03	Bratislava 1
Smikova ulica	Nové Mesto	Otto Smik	831 02	Bratislava 3
Smolenická ulica	Petržalka	Smolenice	851 05	Bratislava 5
Smolnícka ulica	Ružinov	Smolník	821 03	Bratislava 2
Smrečianska ulica	Nové Mesto	Smrečany	811 05, 831 01	Bratislava 1, 37
Snežienková ulica	Nové Mesto	snežienka	831 01	Bratislava 37
Soferove schody	Staré Mesto	Chatam Sofer		
Socháňova ulica	Staré Mesto		811 04	Bratislava 1
Sochorova ulica	Čunovo		851 10	Bratislava 59
Sokolíkova ulica	Dúbravka	Andrej Sokolík	841 01	Bratislava 42
Sokolská ulica	Staré Mesto	Slovenský Sokol	811 04	Bratislava 1
Solivarská ulica	Ružinov	Solivar	821 03	Bratislava 2
Sološnická ulica	Karlova Ves	Sološnica	841 04	Bratislava 4
Somolického ulica	Staré Mesto	Izidor Žiak Somolický	811 06	Bratislava 1
Sosnová ulica	Petržalka	sosna	851 01	Bratislava 5
Sovia ulica	Nové Mesto	sova	831 01	Bratislava 37
Spádová ulica	Devínska Nová Ves		841 07	Bratislava 49
Spätná cesta	Devín		841 07	Bratislava 49
Spišská ulica	Ružinov	Spiš	821 09	Bratislava 2
Spojná ulica	Staré Mesto	spojnica		
Spoločenská ulica	Ružinov	spoločenský život	821 04	Bratislava 2
Sputniková ulica	Ružinov	Sputnik	821 02	Bratislava 2
Sreznevského ulica	Nové Mesto	Izmail Ivanovič Sreznevskij	831 03	Bratislava 3
Srnčia ulica	Staré Mesto	srnec	811 02	Bratislava 1
Stachanovská ulica	Ružinov	Stachanovci	821 05	Bratislava 2
Stálicová ulica	Ružinov	stálica	821 02	Bratislava 2
Stanekova ulica	Lamač	Ivan Stanek	841 03	Bratislava 42
Staničná ulica	Ružinov	stanica	821 04	Bratislava 2
Stará černicová	Ružinov	černice	821 05	Bratislava 2
Stará Ivanská cesta	Ružinov	Ivanská cesta	821 04	Bratislava 2
Stará Klenová	Nové Mesto	Klenová ulica	831 01	Bratislava 37
Stará Prievozská	Ružinov	Prievozská ulica	821 09	Bratislava 2
Stará Stupavská	Rača	Stupavská ulica	831 06	Bratislava 35
Stará Vajnorská	Nové Mesto	Vajnorská ulica	831 04	Bratislava 3
Stará Vinárska	Staré Mesto	vinári	811 04	Bratislava 1
Staré grunty	Karlova Ves	poslovenčenie názvu Steier Grund	841 04	Bratislava 4
Staré ihrisko	Nové Mesto	ihrisko	831 02	Bratislava 3
Staré záhrady	Ružinov	záhrada	821 05	Bratislava 2
Starý most	Petržalka, Staré mesto			
Starhradská ulica	Petržalka	Starhrad	851 05	Bratislava 5
Starohájska ulica	Petržalka	Starý háj	851 02	Bratislava 5
Staromestská ulica	Staré Mesto	staré mesto	811 03	Bratislava 1
Staromlynská ulica	Podunajské Biskupice		821 06	Bratislava 214
Starorímska ulica	Rusovce	Staroveký Rím	851 10	Bratislava 59
Staroturský chodník	Staré Mesto	Stará Turá	811 01	Bratislava 1
Stavbárska ulica	Vrakuňa	stavbár	821 07	Bratislava 214
Staviteľská ulica	Rača	staviteľstvo	831 04	Bratislava 3
Stepná cesta	Devín	step		Bratislava 49
Stodolova ulica	Ružinov	Aurel Stodola	821 08	Bratislava 2
Stoklasová ulica	Karlova Ves	stoklas	841 05	Bratislava 4
Stolárska ulica	Rača	stolár	831 06	Bratislava 35
Strakova ulica	Staré Mesto		811 01	Bratislava 1
Stratená ulica	Rača		831 06	Bratislava 35
Strážna ulica	Nové Mesto		831 01	Bratislava 37
Strážnická ulica	Staré Mesto		811 08	Bratislava 1
Strážny Dom	Nové Mesto		831 02, 06	Bratislava 3, 35
Strečnianska ulica	Petržalka	Strečno	851 05	Bratislava 5
Stredná ulica	Ružinov	stred	821 04	Bratislava 2
Strelecká ulica	Staré Mesto	strelec	811 01	Bratislava 1
Strelkova ulica	Rača		831 06	Bratislava 35
Strmá cesta	Staré Mesto		811 01	Bratislava 1
Strmé sady	Dúbravka		841 01	Bratislava 42
Strminová ulica	Záhorská Bystrica	Strmina	841 06	Bratislava 48
Strmý bok	Dúbravka	hon Strmý bok	841 01	Bratislava 42
Strmý vŕšok	Záhorská Bystrica		841 06	Bratislava 48
Strojnícka ulica	Ružinov	strojníctvo	821 05	Bratislava 2
Stromová ulica	Nové Mesto	strom	831 01	Bratislava 37
Stropkovská ulica	Ružinov	Stropkov	821 03	Bratislava 2
Struková ulica	Ružinov	struk	821 05	Bratislava 2
Studená ulica	Ružinov		821 04	Bratislava 2
Studenohorská ulica	Lamač	Studená hora	841 03	Bratislava 42
Stuhová ulica	Karlova Ves	stuha	841 04	Bratislava 4
Stupavská ulica	Rača	Stupava	831 06	Bratislava 35
Súbežná ulica	Staré Mesto	súbeh	811 04	Bratislava 1
Sudová ulica	Nové Mesto	sud	831 01	Bratislava 37
Súhvezdná ulica	Ružinov	súhvezdie	821 02	Bratislava 2
Suchá ulica	Nové Mesto	sucho	831 01	Bratislava 37
Suché mýto	Staré Mesto	mýto	811 03	Bratislava 1
Suchohradská ulica	Karlova Ves	Suchohrad	841 04	Bratislava 4
Súkennícka ulica	Ružinov	súkenníctvo	821 09	Bratislava 2
Súľovská ulica	Ružinov	Súľovské vrchy	821 05	Bratislava 2
Sumbalova ulica	Karlova Ves	Jaroslav Sumbal	841 04	Bratislava 4
Súmračná ulica	Ružinov	súmrak	821 02	Bratislava 2
Súťažná ulica	Ružinov	súťaž	821 08	Bratislava 2
Svätoplukova ulica	Ružinov	Svätopluk	821 08	Bratislava 2
Svätovavrinecká ulica	Nové Mesto	sv. Vavrinec		
Svätovojtešská ulica	Nové Mesto	svätý Vojtech	831 03	Bratislava 3
Svébska ulica	Rusovce	Svébovia	851 10	Bratislava 59
Svetlá ulica	Staré Mesto	svetlo	811 02	Bratislava 1
Svíbová ulica	Devín, Karlova Ves	svíb	841 04	Bratislava 4
Svidnícka ulica	Ružinov	Svidník	821 03	Bratislava 2
Svoradova ulica	Staré Mesto	sv. Svorad	811 02, 03	Bratislava 1
Svrčia ulica	Karlova Ves	svrček	841 04	Bratislava 4
Syslia ulica	Ružinov	syseľ	821 05	Bratislava 2
Šafranová ulica	Staré Mesto	šafran	811 02	Bratislava 1
Šagátova ulica	Ružinov	Anton Šagát		
Šachorová ulica	Vajnory	Šachor	831 07	Bratislava 36
Šaldova ulica	Vajnory	František Xaver Šalda	831 07	Bratislava 36
Šalviová ulica	Ružinov	šalvia	821 01	Bratislava 2
Šamorínska ulica	Podunajské Biskupice	Šamorín	821 06	Bratislava 214
Šancová ulica	Nové Mesto, Staré Mesto	opevnenie - šance	811 04, 05, 831 04	Bratislava 1, 3
Šándorova ulica	Ružinov	Elo Šándor	821 03	Bratislava 2
Šarišská ulica	Ružinov	Šariš	821 09	Bratislava 2
Šášovská ulica	Petržalka	Šášovský hrad	851 06	Bratislava 5
Šaštínska ulica	Karlova Ves	Šaštín-Stráže	841 04	Bratislava 4
Ševčenkova ulica	Petržalka	Taras Hryhorovyč Ševčenko	851 01	Bratislava 5
Šiesta ulica	Nové Mesto	číslo 6	831 01	Bratislava 37
Šikmá ulica	Podunajské Biskupice		821 06	Bratislava 214
Šinkovské	Vajnory		831 07	Bratislava 36
Šintavská ulica	Petržalka	Šintava	851 05	Bratislava 5
Šípková ulica	Staré Mesto	ruža šípová	811 04	Bratislava 1
Šípová ulica	Vrakuňa	šíp	821 07	Bratislava 214
Šíravská ulica	Vrakuňa	Zemplínska šírava		
Široká ulica	Vajnory	šírka	831 07	Bratislava 36
Škarniclova ulica	Staré Mesto	Jozef Škarnicel	811 01	Bratislava 1
Školská ulica	Staré Mesto	škola	811 07	Bratislava 1
Škovránčia ulica	Staré Mesto	škovránok	811 06	Bratislava 1
Škultétyho ulica	Nové Mesto	Jozef Škultéty	831 03	Bratislava 3
Šoltésovej ulica	Staré Mesto	Elena Maróthy-Šoltésová	811 08	Bratislava 1
Špieszova ulica	Karlova Ves	Anton Špiesz	841 04	Bratislava 4
Špitálska ulica	Staré Mesto	špitál	811 08	Bratislava 1
Športová ulica	Nové Mesto	šport	831 04	Bratislava 3
Šťastná ulica	Ružinov	šťastie	821 05	Bratislava 2
Štátne lesy	Podunajské Biskupice			
Štedrá ulica	Ružinov	štedrosť	821 03	Bratislava 2
Štefana Rosívala	Záhorská Bystrica	Štefan Rosival	841 06	Bratislava 48
Štefánikova ulica	Staré Mesto	Milan Rastislav Štefánik	811 04, 05, 06	Bratislava 1
Štefanovičova ulica	Staré Mesto	Miloš Štefanovič	811 04, 06	Bratislava 1
Štefunkova ulica	Ružinov	Fraňo Štefunko	821 03	Bratislava 2
Štepná ulica	Dúbravka	štep	841 01	Bratislava 42
Štetinova ulica	Staré Mesto	Mikuláš Bakalár Štetina	811 06	Bratislava 1
Štiavnická ulica	Ružinov	Banská Štiavnica	821 04	Bratislava 2
Štítova ulica	Devín		841 10	Bratislava 49
Štrbská ulica	Devín	Štrba	841 10	Bratislava 49
Štúrova ulica	Staré Mesto	Ľudovít Velislav Štúr	811 02	Bratislava 1
Štvrtá ulica	Nové Mesto	číslo 4	831 01	Bratislava 37
Štyndlova ulica	Ružinov		821 05	Bratislava 2
Šulekova ulica	Staré Mesto	Viliam Šulek	811 03, 06	Bratislava 1
Šumavská ulica	Ružinov	Šumava	821 08	Bratislava 2
Šuňavcova ulica	Nové Mesto	Matej Šuňavec	831 02	Bratislava 3
Šúrska ulica	Rača	Šúr	831 06	Bratislava 35
Šustekova ulica	Petržalka	Daniel Šustek	851 04	Bratislava 5
Šutráková ulica	Vajnory		831 07	Bratislava 36
Šuty	Vajnory		831 07	Bratislava 36
Švabinského ulica	Petržalka	Max Švabinský	851 01	Bratislava 5
Švajčiareň	Rusovce	horáreň Švajčiareň	851 10	Bratislava 59
Švantnerova ulica	Dúbravka	František Švantner	841 02	Bratislava 42
Tabaková ulica	Staré Mesto	tabak	811 07	Bratislava 1
Tablicová ulica	Staré Mesto	Bohuslav Tablic	811 04	Bratislava 1
Táborská ulica	Ružinov	Tábor	821 04	Bratislava 2
Tajovského ulica	Staré Mesto	Jozef Gregor Tajovský	811 04	Bratislava 1
Talichova ulica	Dúbravka	Václav Talich	841 02	Bratislava 42
Tallerova ulica	Staré Mesto	Paulus Taller	811 02	Bratislava 1
Tatranská ulica	Záhorská Bystrica	Tatry	841 06	Bratislava 48
Tavarikova osada	Dúbravka	František Tavarik	841 02	Bratislava 42
Tbiliská ulica	Rača	Tbilisi	831 06	Bratislava 35
Tehelná ulica	Nové Mesto	tehla	831 03	Bratislava 3
Tehelňa	Devínska Nová Ves	tehelňa	841 07	Bratislava 49
Tehliarska ulica	Devínska Nová Ves	tehliarstvo	841 07	Bratislava 49
Technická ulica	Ružinov	technika	821 04	Bratislava 2
Tekovská ulica	Ružinov	Tekov	821 09	Bratislava 2
Telocvičná ulica	Ružinov	telocvik	821 05	Bratislava 2
Tematínska ulica	Petržalka	Tematín	851 05	Bratislava 5
Teplická ulica	Nové Mesto		831 02	Bratislava 3
Terchovská ulica	Ružinov	Terchová		
Teslova ulica	Ružinov	Nikola Tesla	821 02	Bratislava 2
Tešedíkova ulica	Záhorská Bystrica	Samuel Tešedík	841 06	Bratislava 48
Tetmayerova ulica	Nové Mesto		831 03	Bratislava 3
Textilanka	Devínska Nová Ves		841 10	Bratislava 49
Thurzova ulica	Nové Mesto		831 02	Bratislava 3
Tibenského ulica	Vajnory		831 07	Bratislava 36
Tibériova ulica	Rusovce	Tibérius	851 10	Bratislava 59
Tichá ulica	Staré Mesto		811 02	Bratislava 1
Tilgnerova ulica	Karlova Ves	Viktor Oskar Tilgner	841 04	Bratislava 4
Timravina ulica	Staré Mesto	Božena Slančíková-Timrava	811 06	Bratislava 1
Tobrucká ulica	Staré Mesto	Tobruk	811 02	Bratislava 1
Tokajícka ulica	Ružinov	Tokajík	821 03	Bratislava 2
Tolstého ulica	Staré Mesto	Lev Nikolajevič Tolstoj	811 06	Bratislava 1
Tománkova ulica	Karlova Ves		841 05	Bratislava 4
Tomanova ulica	Vajnory		831 07	Bratislava 36
Tomášikova ulica	Nové Mesto, Ružinov	Samo Tomášik	821 01, 02, 03, 04	Bratislava 2
Toplianska ulica	Vrakuňa	Topľa	821 07	Bratislava 214
Topoľčianska	Petržalka	kaštieľ v Topoľčiankach	851 05	Bratislava 5
Topoľová ulica	Staré Mesto	topoľ	811 04	Bratislava 1
Toryská ulica	Vrakuňa	Torysa	821 07	Bratislava 214
Továrenská ulica	Staré Mesto	továreň	811 09	Bratislava 1
Trajánova ulica	Rusovce	Traján	851 10	Bratislava 59
Tramínová ulica	Nové Mesto	tramín		
Tranovského ulica	Dúbravka	Juraj Tranovský	841 02	Bratislava 42
Trávna ulica	Rača	tráva	831 06	Bratislava 35
Trebišovská ulica	Ružinov	Trebišov	821 01, 02	Bratislava 2
Trenčianska ulica	Ružinov	Trenčín	821 09	Bratislava 2
Treskoňova ulica	Staré Mesto	Ladislav Treskoň	811 06	Bratislava 1
Tretia ulica	Nové Mesto	číslo 3	831 01	Bratislava 37
Trhová ulica	Dúbravka	trh	841 01	Bratislava 42
Trinásta ulica	Nové Mesto	číslo 13	831 01	Bratislava 37
Trnavská ulica	Nové Mesto	Trnava	831 04	Bratislava 3
Trnavská cesta	Ružinov	Trnava	821 01, 02, 04, 08	Bratislava 2
Trnavské mýto	Nové Mesto	Trnava	831 03	Bratislava 3
Trnková ulica	Jarovce	trnka obyčajná	851 10	Bratislava 59
Tŕňová ulica	Ružinov	tŕň	821 04	Bratislava 2
Trojdomy	Nové Mesto		831 02	Bratislava 3
Trstínska ulica	Záhorská Bystrica	Trstín	841 06	Bratislava 48
Tučkova ulica	Ružinov		821 05	Bratislava 2
Tuhovská ulica	Vajnory	Tuhovské		
Tulipánová ulica	Dúbravka	tulipán	841 01	Bratislava 42
Tupého ulica	Nové Mesto		831 01	Bratislava 37
Tupolevova ulica	Petržalka	Andrej Nikolajevič Tupolev	851 01	Bratislava 5
Turbínová ulica	Nové Mesto	turbína	831 04	Bratislava 3
Turčianska ulica	Ružinov	Turiec	821 09	Bratislava 2
Turistická ulica	Čunovo	turistika	851 10	Bratislava 59
Turnianska ulica	Petržalka	Turniansky hrad	851 07	Bratislava 5
Tvarožkova ulica	Staré Mesto	Tomáš Tvarožek	811 03	Bratislava 1
Tvrdého ulica	Ružinov		821 08	Bratislava 2
Tylova ulica	Nové Mesto	Josef Kajetán Tyl	831 04	Bratislava 3
Tymianová ulica	Vrakuňa	tymian	821 07	Bratislava 214
Tyršovo nábrežie	Petržalka	Miroslav Tyrš	851 10	Bratislava 5
Učiteľská ulica	Podunajské Biskupice	učiteľ	821 06	Bratislava 214
Údernícka ulica	Petržalka	úderník	851 01	Bratislava 5
Údolná ulica	Staré Mesto	údolie	811 02	Bratislava 1
Uhliská	Vajnory		831 07	Bratislava 36
Uhorková ulica	Ružinov	uhorka	821 05	Bratislava 2
Uhrova ulica	Nové Mesto	Miloš Uher	831 01	Bratislava 37
Uhrovecká ulica	Devínska Nová Ves	Uhrovec	841 07	Bratislava 49
Ukrajinská ulica	Nové Mesto	Ukrajina	831 02	Bratislava 3
Ulica 1. mája	Devínska Nová Ves	Sviatok práce	841 07	Bratislava 49
Ulica 29. augusta	Staré Mesto	Slovenské národné povstanie	811 07, 08, 09	Bratislava 1
Ulica 8. mája	Podunajské Biskupice	Deň víťazstva nad fašizmom	821 06	Bratislava 214
Ulica Ágosta Sötéra	Rusovce	Ágosta Sötér	851 10	Bratislava 59
Ulica Albína Brunovského	Karlova Ves	Albín Brunovský	841 05	Bratislava 4
Ulica Alviano	Vajnory	Alviano	831 07	Bratislava 36
Ulica Alžbety Gwerkovej	Petržalka	Alžbeta Göllnerová-Gwerková	851 04	Bratislava 5
Ulica Andreja Mráza	Ružinov	Andrej Mráz	821 03	
Ulica Andreja Plávku	Staré Mesto	Andrej Plávka	811 06	
Ulica Antona Floreka	Záhorská Bystrica	Anton Florek	841 06	Bratislava 48
Ulica Augustína Murína	Rača	Augustín Murín	831 53	
Ulica Boženy Němcovej	Staré Mesto	Božena Němcová	811 04	Bratislava 1
Ulica československých parašutistov	Nové Mesto	parašutisti	831 03	Bratislava 3
Ulica československých tankistov	Záhorská Bystrica	tankisti	841 06	Bratislava 48
Ulica Dr. Vladimíra Clementisa	Ružinov	Vladimír Clementis	821 02	Bratislava 2
Ulica Ferdiša Kostku	Karlova Ves	Ferdiš Kostka	841 05	Bratislava 4
Ulica francúzskych partizánov	Staré Mesto	partizáni	811 04	Bratislava 1
Ulica Fraňa Kráľa	Staré Mesto	Fraňo Kráľ	811 05	Bratislava 1
Ulica Františka Schmuckera	Jarovce	František Schmucker	851 10	Bratislava 59
Ulica Františka Oswalda	Petržalka	František Oswald		
Ulica gen. mjr. Antona Petráka	Petržalka	Anton Petrák		
Ulica Hany Meličkovej	Karlova Ves	Hana Meličková	841 05	Bratislava 4
Ulica Imricha Karvaša	Staré Mesto	Imrich Karvaš		
Ulica Ivana Blazeviča	Jarovce	Ivan Blazevič	851 10	Bratislava 59
Ulica Ivana Bukovčana	Devínska Nová Ves	Ivan Bukovčan	841 08	Bratislava 49
Ulica Ivana Horvátha	Ružinov	Ivan Horváth	821 03	Bratislava 2
Ulica Jána Valašťana Dolinského	Dúbravka	Ján Valašťan Dolinský	841 01	Bratislava 42
Ulica Jána Dekana	Rusovce	Ján Dekan	851 10	Bratislava 59
Ulica Jána Jonáša	Devínska Nová Ves	Ján Jonáš	841 08	Bratislava 49
Ulica Jána Poničana	Devínska Nová Ves	Ján Poničan	841 08	Bratislava 49
Jána Raka	Záhorská Bystrica	Ján Rak	841 06	Bratislava 48
Ulica Jána Smreka	Devínska Nová Ves	Ján Smrek	841 08	Bratislava 49
Ulica Jána Stanislava	Karlova Ves	Ján Stanislav	841 05	Bratislava 4
Ulica Janka Alexyho	Dúbravka	Janko Alexy	841 01	Bratislava 42
Ulica Janka Kráľa	Podunajské Biskupice	Janko Kráľ	821 06	Bratislava 214
Ulica Jozefa Cígera-Hronského	Nové Mesto	Jozef Cíger-Hronský	831 02	Bratislava 3
Jozefa Kronera	Staré Mesto	Jozef Kroner	811 05	Bratislava 1
Ulica Jozefa Mikisitsa	Jarovce	Jozef Mikisits	851 10	Bratislava 59
Ulica Jozefa Vachovského	Záhorská Bystrica	Jozef Vachovský	841 06	Bratislava 48
Ulica Jura Hronca	Dúbravka	Jur Hronec	841 02	Bratislava 42
Ulica Karola Adlera	Dúbravka	Karol Adler	841 02	Bratislava 42
Ulica Kataríny Brúderovej	Vajnory	Katarína Brúderová	831 07	Bratislava 36
Ulica kpt. Rašu	Dúbravka	Ján Rašo	841 01	Bratislava 42
Ulica Kristy Bendovej	Dúbravka	Krista Bendová	841 02	Bratislava 42
Ulica Ladislava Batthyányho	Jarovce	Ladislav Batthyány	851 10	Bratislava 59
Ulica Ladislava Dérera	Nové Mesto	Ladislav Dérer	831 01	Bratislava 37
Ulica Ladislava Sáru	Karlova Ves	Ladislav Sára	841 04	Bratislava 4
Ulica Ladislava Šefca	Petržalka	Ladislav Šefc		
Ulica Ľuda Zúbka	Dúbravka	Ľudo Zúbek	841 01	Bratislava 42
Ulica Ľudmily Kraskovskej	Rusovce	Ľudmila Kraskovská	851 10	Bratislava 59
Ulica Ľudovíta Fullu	Karlova Ves	Ľudovít Fulla	841 05	Bratislava 4
Ulica Marie Curie Sklodowskej	Petržalka	Maria Curie Sklodowská	851 04	Bratislava 5
Ulica Mariána Kochanského	Petržalka	Marián Kochanský		
Ulica Martina Granca	Dúbravka	Martin Granec	841 02	Bratislava 42
Ulica Mateja Bela	Staré Mesto	Matej Bel	811 06	Bratislava 1
Ulica Maximiliána Hella	Ružinov	Maximilián Hell		
Ulica Medveďovej	Petržalka	Mária Medveďová	851 04	Bratislava 5
Ulica Mikuláša Schneidra-Trnavského	Dúbravka	Mikuláš Schneider-Trnavský	841 01	Bratislava 42
Ulica Milana Marečka	Devínska Nová Ves	Milan Mareček	841 08	Bratislava 49
Ulica Milana Pišúta	Devínska Nová Ves	Milan Pišút	841 07	Bratislava 49
Ulica odbojárov	Nové Mesto	odboj	831 04	Bratislava 3
Ulica Ondreja Štefanka	Petržalka	Ondrej Štefanko	851 01	Bratislava 5
Ulica Ota Holúska	Záhorská Bystrica	Oto Holúsek	841 06	Bratislava 48
Ulica padlých hrdinov	Podunajské Biskupice		821 06	Bratislava 214
Ulica Pave Vukoviča	Jarovce	Pave Vukovič	851 10	Bratislava 59
Ulica Pavla Blaha	Záhorská Bystrica	Pavel Blaho	841 06	Bratislava 48
Ulica Pavla Horova	Devínska Nová Ves	Pavol Horov	841 08	Bratislava 49
Ulica Petara Pasicha	Jarovce	Petar Pasich	851 10	Bratislava 59
Ulica planét	Ružinov	planéty	821 02	Bratislava 2
Ulica plk. Prvoniča	Záhorská Bystrica	Anton Prvonič	841 06	Bratislava 48
Ulica pohraničníkov	Rusovce	pohraničník	851 10	Bratislava 59
Ulica Prokopa Veľkého	Staré Mesto	Prokop Holý	811 04	Bratislava 1
Ulica Radoslava Hošeka	Rusovce	Radoslav Hošek	851 10	Bratislava 59
Ulica Severovcov	Rusovce	dynastia Severovcov	851 10	Bratislava 59
Ulica svätého Pia X.	Záhorská Bystrica	Pius X.		
Ulica sv. Vincenta	Ružinov	Vincent de Paul	821 03	Bratislava 2
Ulica svornosti	Podunajské Biskupice	svornosť		
Ulica Štefana Králika	Devínska Nová Ves	Štefan Králik	841 07, 08	Bratislava 49
Ulica Štefana Majera	Záhorská Bystrica	Štefan Majer	841 06	Bratislava 48
Ulica Štefana Rosívala	Záhorská Bystrica	Štefan Rosíval	841 06	Bratislava 48
Ulica Valentína Matrku	Lamač	Valentín Matrka		
Ulica Viktora Tegelhoffa	Nové Mesto	Viktor Tegelhoff	831 04	Bratislava 3
Ulica Viliama Figuša-Bystrého	Ružinov	Viliam Figuš-Bystrý	821 03	Bratislava 2
Ulica Vincenta Hložníka	Karlova Ves	Vincent Hložník	841 05	Bratislava 4
Ulica Violy Valachovej	Dúbravka	Viola Valachová	841 01	Bratislava 42 ????
Úprkova ulica	Staré Mesto	Joža Uprka	811 04	Bratislava 1
Úradnícká ulica	Nové Mesto	úradník	831 03	Bratislava 3
Uránová ulica	Ružinov	urán	821 02	Bratislava 2
Urbánkova ulica	Staré Mesto	Ferko Urbánek	811 04	Bratislava 1
Urbárska ulica	Jarovce	urbár	851 10	Bratislava 59
Urpínska ulica	Petržalka	Urpín	851 01	
Ursínyho ulica	Nové Mesto	Michal Ursíny	831 02	Bratislava 3
Uršulínska ulica	Staré Mesto	uršulínky	811 01	Bratislava 1
Ušiakova ulica	Dúbravka	Ján Ušiak	841 01	Bratislava 42
Úvozná ulica	Devín	úvoz	841 10	Bratislava 49
Uzbecká ulica	Podunajské Biskupice, Vrakuňa	Uzbekistan	821 07	Bratislava 214
Úzka ulica	Staré Mesto	šírka		
Úžiny	Rača	úžina	831 06	Bratislava 35
V záhradách	Staré Mesto	záhrada	811 02	Bratislava 1
Vajanského nábrežie	Staré Mesto	Svetozár Hurban-Vajanský	811 02	Bratislava 1
Vajnorská ulica	Nové Mesto	Vajnory	831 03, 04	Bratislava 3
Valašská ulica	Staré Mesto		811 04	Bratislava 1
Valentiniánova ulica	Rusovce	Valentinián I.	851 10	Bratislava 59
Valchárska ulica	Ružinov		821 09	Bratislava 2
Vančurova ulica	Nové Mesto	Vladislav Vančura	831 01	Bratislava 37
Vansovej ulica	Staré Mesto	Terézia Vansová		
Vápencová ulica	Devínska Nová Ves	vápenec	841 07	Bratislava 49
Vápenka	Devínska Nová Ves	vápenka	841 07	Bratislava 49
Vápenná ulica	Ružinov	vápno	821 04	Bratislava 2
Varínska ulica	Ružinov	Varín	821 05	Bratislava 2
Varšavská ulica	Nové Mesto	Varšava	831 03	Bratislava 3
Vavilovova ulica	Petržalka	Nikolaj Ivanovič Vavilov	851 01	Bratislava 5
Vavrinecká ulica	Nové Mesto			
Vavrínová ulica	Ružinov	vavrín	821 03	Bratislava 2
Vazovova ulica	Staré Mesto	Ivan Vazov	811 07	Bratislava 1
Vážska ulica	Vrakuňa	Váh	821 07	Bratislava 214
Včelárska ulica	Ružinov	včelárstvo	821 05	Bratislava 2
Velehradská ulica	Ružinov	Velehrad	821 08	Bratislava 2
Veľké Štepnice	Vajnory		831 07	Bratislava 36
Veľký Varan	Nové Mesto			
Veltlínska ulica	Nové Mesto	veltlín	831 02	Bratislava 3
Vendelínska ulica	Dúbravka		841 01	Bratislava 42
Ventúrska ulica	Staré Mesto		811 01	Bratislava 1
Veterná ulica	Staré Mesto	vietor	811 03	Bratislava 1
Veternicová ulica	Karlova Ves	veternica	841 05	Bratislava 4
Vetvárska ulica	Podunajské Biskupice		821 06	Bratislava 214
Vetvová ulica	Staré Mesto	vetva	811 02	Bratislava 1
Vidlicová ulica	Nové Mesto		831 01	Bratislava 37
Viedenská cesta	Petržalka	Viedeň	850 00, 851 01	Bratislava 5
Vietnamská ulica	Ružinov	Vietnam	821 04	Bratislava 2
Vígľašská ulica	Petržalka	Vígľaš	851 07	Bratislava 5
Vihorlatská ulica	Nové Mesto, Ružinov	Vihorlat	831 04	Bratislava 3
Viktorínova ulica	Ružinov	Jozef Karol Viktorín		
Vilová ulica	Petržalka	vila	851 01, 02	Bratislava 5
Viničná ulica	Devín	vinič	841 10	Bratislava 49
Viniferová ulica	Nové Mesto		831 01	Bratislava 37
Vínna ulica	Nové Mesto	víno	831 02	Bratislava 3
Vinohradnícka ulica	Podunajské Biskupice	vinohradníctvo		
Višňová ulica	Nové Mesto	višňa	831 01	Bratislava 37
Víťazná ulica	Rača	víťazstvo	831 06	Bratislava 35
Vlárska ulica	Nové Mesto	Vlára	831 01	Bratislava 37
Vlčie hrdlo	Ružinov		821 07	Bratislava 214
Vlčkova ulica	Staré Mesto	Jaroslav Vlček	811 04, 05, 06	Bratislava 1
Vodný vrch	Staré Mesto			
Vosková ulica	Nové Mesto	vosk	831 01	Bratislava 37
Votrubova ulica	Ružinov	František Votruba	821 09	Bratislava 2
Vrábeľská ulica	Ružinov	Vráble	821 09	Bratislava 2
Vrakunská ulica	Podunajské Biskupice	Vrakuňa	821 06	Bratislava 214
Vrakunská cesta	Ružinov	Vrakuňa	821 04	Bratislava 2
Vrančovičova ulica	Lamač	Blažej Vrančovič	841 03	Bratislava 42
Vranovská ulica	Petržalka	Vranov nad Topľou	851 01	Bratislava 5
Vrátňanská ulica	Staré Mesto			
Vrbárska ulica	Záhorská Bystrica			
Vrbenského ulica	Rača		831 53	Bratislava 34
Vŕbová ulica	Vrakuňa	vŕba	821 07	Bratislava 214
Vresová ulica	Nové Mesto	vres	831 01	Bratislava 37
Vretenová ulica	Karlova Ves	vreteno	841 04	Bratislava 4
Vrchná ulica	Staré Mesto		811 02	Bratislava 1
Vrútocká ulica	Ružinov	Vrútky	821 04	Bratislava 2
Vtáčikova cesta	Rača		831 06	Bratislava 35
Vtáčnik	Nové Mesto		831 01	Bratislava 37
Vyhliadka	Karlova Ves	vyhliadka	841 05	Bratislava 4
Vyhnianska cesta	Nové Mesto		831 02	Bratislava 3
Výhonská ulica	Rača		831 06	Bratislava 35
Východná ulica	Rača	východ	831 06	Bratislava 35
Východné	Rača	východ		
Vysoká ulica	Staré Mesto		811 06	Bratislava 1
Vysoká hora	Lamač			
Vysokohorská ulica	Lamač		841 03	Bratislava 42
Vyšehradská ulica	Petržalka	Vyšehrad	851 06	Bratislava 5
Vyšná ulica	Ružinov		821 05	Bratislava 2
Výtvarná ulica	Podunajské Biskupice	výtvarné umenie	821 06	Bratislava 214
Vývojová ulica	Rusovce	vývoj	851 10	Bratislava 59
Wattova ulica	Ružinov	James Watt	821 04	Bratislava 2
Wilsonova ulica	Staré Mesto	Woodrow Wilson	811 07	Bratislava 1
Wolkrova ulica	Petržalka	Jiří Wolker	851 01	Bratislava 5
Za bránou	Devín	brána	841 10	Bratislava 49
Za farou	Vajnory	fara	831 07	Bratislava 36
Za humnami	Vajnory	humno	831 07	Bratislava 36
Za Kasárňou	Nové Mesto		831 03	Bratislava 3
Za mlynom	Vajnory	mlyn	831 07	Bratislava 36
Za sokolovňou	Staré Mesto	sokolovňa	811 04	Bratislava 1
Za Stanicou	Nové Mesto		831 04	Bratislava 3
Za tehelňou	Ružinov	tehelňa	821 04	Bratislava 2
Záborského ulica	Nové Mesto	Jonáš Záborský	831 03	Bratislava 3
Zadunajská cesta	Petržalka	Dunaj	851 01	Bratislava 5
Zafírová ulica	Jarovce	zafír	851 10	Bratislava 59
Záhorácka ulica	Staré Mesto	Záhorák	811 04	Bratislava 1
Záhorská ulica	Záhorská Bystrica	Záhorie	841 06	Bratislava 48
Záhradkárska ulica	Dúbravka	záhradkár	841 02	Bratislava 42
Záhradná ulica	Devínska Nová Ves	záhrada	841 07	Bratislava 49
Záhradnícka ulica	Ružinov, Staré Mesto	záhradníctvo	811 07, 08, 821 08	Bratislava 1, 2
Záhrady	Lamač	záhrada		
Záhrebská ulica	Staré Mesto	Záhreb	811 05, 07	Bratislava 1
Záhumenná ulica	Čunovo		851 10	Bratislava 59
Záhumenská ulica	Záhorská Bystrica		841 06	Bratislava 48
Zákutie	Záhorská Bystrica		841 06	Bratislava 48
Zálužická ulica	Ružinov		821 01	Bratislava 2
Zamatová ulica	Jarovce	zamat	851 10	Bratislava 59
Zámocká ulica	Staré Mesto	zámok	811 01	Bratislava 1
Zámocké schody	Staré Mesto	zámok	811 01	Bratislava 1
Zámočnícka ulica	Staré Mesto	zámočník	811 03	Bratislava 1
Západná ulica	Ružinov	západ	821 02	Bratislava 2
Západný rad	Staré Mesto	západ	811 04	Bratislava 1
Záporožská ulica	Petržalka	Záporožie	851 01	Bratislava 5
Záruby	Nové Mesto	Záruby	831 01	Bratislava 37
Zárubová ulica	Záhorská Bystrica	Záruby	841 06	Bratislava 48
Zátišie	Nové Mesto	zátišie	831 03	Bratislava 3
Záturecká ulica	Vajnory	Záturčie		Bratislava 3
Zavadilova ulica	Devínska Nová Ves	Josef Zavadil	841 08	Bratislava 49
Závadská ulica	Rača		831 06	Bratislava 35
Záveterná ulica	Devínska Nová Ves	vietor	841 07	Bratislava 49
Závodná ulica	Podunajské Biskupice	závod	821 06	Bratislava 214
Závodníkova ulica	Nové Mesto		831 03	Bratislava 3
Zborovská ulica	Ružinov	Zborov	821 08	Bratislava 2
Zbrody	Vajnory		831 07	Bratislava 36
Zdravotnícka ulica	Rusovce	zdravotníctvo	851 10	Bratislava 59
Zelená ulica	Staré Mesto	zelená farba	811 01	Bratislava 1
Zeleninová ulica	Jarovce	zelenina	851 10	Bratislava 59
Zelenohorská ulica	Lamač	Zelená hora	841 03	Bratislava 42
Zelinárska ulica	Ružinov		821 08	Bratislava 2
Zhorínska ulica	Lamač		841 03	Bratislava 42
Zidiny	Lamač, Nové Mesto	Sitina	841 03	Bratislava 42
Zimná ulica	Ružinov	zima	821 02	Bratislava 2
Zlatá ulica	Rača	zlato	831 06	Bratislava 35
Zlaté piesky	Ružinov	Zlaté piesky	821 04	Bratislava 2
Zlatohorská ulica	Lamač	Zlatá hora	841 03	Bratislava 42
Znievska ulica	Petržalka	Zniev	851 06	Bratislava 5
Zobová ulica	Čunovo	vtáčí zob	851 10	Bratislava 59
Zohorská ulica	Karlova Ves	Zohor	841 04	Bratislava 4
Zochova ulica	Staré Mesto	Samuel Zoch	811 02, 03	Bratislava 1
Zrínskeho ulica	Staré Mesto	Mikuláš Šubič Zrínsky	811 03	Bratislava 1
Zväzácka ulica	Petržalka	Socialistický zväz mládeže		
Zvolenská ulica	Ružinov	Zvolen	821 09	Bratislava 2
Zvončeková ulica	Rača	zvonček	831 06	Bratislava 35
Žabí majer	Rača	Žaba	830 00	Bratislava 3
Žabotova ulica	Staré Mesto	Ivan Žabota	811 04	Bratislava 1
Žarnovická ulica	Rača	Žarnovica	831 06	Bratislava 35
Žatevná ulica	Dúbravka	žatva	841 01	Bratislava 42
Žehrianska ulica	Petržalka	Žehra	851 07	Bratislava 5
Železná ulica	Ružinov	železo	821 04	Bratislava 2
Železničiarska ulica	Staré Mesto	železničiar	811 04	Bratislava 1
Železničná ulica	Vrakuňa	železnica	821 07	Bratislava 214
Želiarska ulica	Devínska Nová Ves	želiar	841 07	Bratislava 49
Žellova ulica	Ružinov	Ľudovít Žello	821 08	Bratislava 2
Žiacka ulica	Podunajské Biskupice	žiak	821 06	Bratislava 214
Žiarska ulica	Staré Mesto	Žiar	811 03	Bratislava 1
Židovská ulica	Staré Mesto	Židia	811 01	Bratislava 1
Žihľavová ulica	Vrakuňa	žihľava	821 07	Bratislava 214
Žilinská ulica	Staré Mesto	Žilina	811 05, 06	Bratislava 1
Žitavská ulica	Vrakuňa	Žitava (rieka)	821 07	Bratislava 214
Žitná ulica	Rača	žito	831 06	Bratislava 35
Živnostenská ulica	Staré Mesto	živnosť	811 06	Bratislava 1
Žižkova ulica	Staré Mesto	Jan Žižka	811 02	Bratislava 1
Žltá ulica	Petržalka	žltá farba	851 07	Bratislava 5
Žulová ulica	Rača	žula	831 06	Bratislava 35

== Sources ==
- Abecedný zoznam ulíc Bratislavy (verzia z 29.7.2013) (slovak)
- Poštové smerovacie čísla (slovak)
