= Zelenin =

Zelenin (feminine: Zelenina) is a Russian-language surname. It may refer to:

- Aleksandra Zelenina, Moldovan athlete
- Dmitry Zelenin (disambiguation):
  - Dmitry Konstantinovich Zelenin, Russian ethnographer
  - Dmitry Vadimovich Zelenin, Russian politician
- Oleg Zelenin, Russian footballer
- Sergei Zelenin, Russian footballer
