= Dmitry Zelenin =

Dmitry Zelenin may refer to:

- Dmitry Zelenin (ethnographer), Russian ethnographer
- Dmitry Vadimovich Zelenin, Russian politician
