= Jastrab =

Jastrab is a surname which means "hawk" in Slovak. Notable people with the surname include:

- Marek Jastráb (born 1993), Slovak footballer
- Megan Jastrab (born 2002), American racing cyclist
- Ryan Jastrab (born 2000), American para-cyclist
