= Sergei Zelenin =

Russian footballer

Personal information
- Date of birth: 1 September 1975 (age 51)
- Place of birth: Bryansk, Russian SFSR
- Position: Midfielder

Youth career
- FC Lokomotiv Bryansk

Senior career*
Years	Team	Apps	(Gls)
1991	FC Dynamo Bryansk	14	(0)
1992	FC Kuban Krasnodar	3	(0)
1992	FC Niva Slavyansk-na-Kubani	1	(0)
1993	FC Zarya Leninsk-Kuznetsky	10	(0)
1994–1995	FC Spartak Bryansk (amateur)		
1996	FC Spartak Bryansk	7	(0)
- * Club domestic league appearances and goals

Sergei Zelenin (Russian: Сергей Зеленин; born 1 September 1975 in Bryansk) is a former Russian football player.
