= Kapituła, Łódź Voivodeship =

Kapituła
- Village
- Location within Poland
- Coordinates: 51°6′25″N 18°47′18″E
- Country: Poland
- Voivodeship: Łódź
- County: Pajęczno
- Gmina: Działoszyn

Kapituła [kapiˈtuwa] is a village in the administrative district of Gmina Działoszyn, within Pajęczno County, Łódź Voivodeship, in central Poland.
