= Gajc =

Coordinates: 48.081105°N 17.167841°E

- IUCN category IV (habitat/species management area)
- Interactive map of Gajc
- Area: 0.6272 km^{2}
- Established: 1988
- Governing body: ŠOP - S-CHKO Dunajské luhy

Gajc is a nature reserve in the Podunajské Biskupice district of Bratislava, Slovakia. The nature reserve covers an area of 62.72 ha on the left shore of the Danube. It has a protection level of 4 under the Slovak nature protection system. The nature reserve is part of the Dunajské luhy Protected Landscape Area.

== Description ==
The protected area was created to safeguard the protection of steppe habitats in the immediate vicinity of floodplain forests.
