= Srnec =

Srnec (Czech feminine: Srncová) is a surname. Notable people with the surname include:

- Aleksandar Srnec (1924–2010), Croatian artist
- Božena Srncová (1925–1997), Czech gymnast
- Jiří Srnec (1931–2021), Czech theatre director and artist
