= List of Slovak authors =

The following is a list of notable Slovak writers.

== Prose and drama ==
=== Baroque (1650–1780) ===
- Matthias Bel (1684–1749)
- Adam František Kollár (1718–1783)
- Daniel Sinapius-Horčička (1640–1688)

=== Classicism (1780–1840) ===
- Jozef Ignác Bajza (1755–1836)
- Juraj Fándly (1750–1811)
- Ján Chalupka (1791–1871)
- Ján Kollár (1793–1852)
- Pavol Jozef Šafárik (Pavel Josef Šafařík) (1795–1861)

=== Romanticism (1840–1850) ===
- Pavol Dobšinský (1828–1885)
- Michal Miloslav Hodža (1811–1870)
- Jozef Miloslav Hurban (1817–1888)
- Ľudovít Štúr (1815–1856)
- Samo Tomášik (1813–1887)

=== Between Romanticism and Realism (1850–1875) ===
- Jakub Grajchman (1822–1897)
- Jonáš Záborský (1812–1876)

=== Realism (1875–1905) ===
- Janko Alexy (1894–1970)
- Pavol Országh Hviezdoslav (1849–1921)
- Martin Kukučín (1860–1928)
- Kristína Royová (1860–1936)
- Jozef Gregor-Tajovský (1874–1940)
- Timrava (Božena Slančíková) (1867–1951)
- Svetozár Hurban-Vajanský (1847–1916)

=== Modernism (1905–1918) ===
- Janko Jesenský (1874–1945)
- Ivan Krasko (1876–1958)

=== Between the World Wars (1918–1948) ===
- Vladimír Clementis (1902–1952)
- Margita Figuli (1909–1995)
- Jozef Cíger-Hronský (1896–1960)
- Dobroslav Chrobák (1907–1951)
- Štefan Krčméry (1892–1955)
- Ladislav Nádaši-Jégé (1866–1940)
- Ľudo Ondrejov (1901–1962)
- Martin Rázus (1888–1937)
- Ivan Stodola (1888–1977)
- František Švantner (1912–1950)
- Milo Urban (1904–1982)

=== Literature after World War II (1948–1964) ===
- Jozef Dunajovec (1933–2007)
- Katarína Lazarová (1914–1995)
- Ladislav Mňačko (1919–1994)
- Hana Zelinová (1914–2004)
- Štefan Žáry (1918–2007)

=== Contemporary literature (1964–1995) ===
- Emil Benčík (born 1933)
- Ladislav Grosman (1921–1981)
- Anton Hykisch (1932–2024)
- Peter Jaroš (born 1940)
- Milan Lasica (1940–2021)
- Hana Ponická (1922–2007)
- Miriam Roth (1910–2005)
- Július Satinský (1941–2002)
- Dušan Slobodník (1927–2001)
- Ladislav Švihran (1931–2022)
- Vojtech Zamarovský (1919–2006)
- Zuzka Zguriška (1900–1984)

=== Contemporary literature (since 1995) ===
- Radovan Brenkus (born 1974)
- Juraj Červenák (born 1974)
- Dušan Fabian (born 1975)
- Michal Hvorecký (born 1976)
- Jozef Karika (born 1978)
- Ľuba Lesná (born 1954)
- Jozef Ján Matejka (born 1949)
- Vladimir Oravsky (born 1947)
- Peter Pišťanek (1960–2015)
- Radoslav Rochallyi (born 1980)
- Miroslav Šustek (born 1947)

== Poetry ==
=== Renaissance (1500–1650) ===
- Martin Rakovský (1535–1579)
- Vavrinec Benedikt z Nedožier (Laurentius Benedictus Nudozierinus) (1555–1615)

=== Baroque (1650–1780) ===
- Juraj Tranovský or Tranoscius (1592–1637)
- Daniel Sinapius-Horčička (1640–1688)
- Hugolín Gavlovič (1712–1787)

=== Classicism (1780–1840) ===
- Pavel Jozef Šafárik (1795–1861)
- Ján Kollár (1793–1852)
- Ján Hollý (1785–1849)

=== Romanticism (1840–1850) ===
- Ľudovít Štúr (1815–1856)
- Samo Chalupka (1812–1883)
- Andrej Sládkovič (1820–1872)
- Janko Kráľ (1822–1876)
- Ján Botto (1829–1881)
- Janko Matúška (1821–1877)
- Michal Miloslav Hodža (1811–1870)

=== Realism (1875–1905) ===
- Pavol Országh-Hviezdoslav (1849–1921)
- Martin Kukučín (1860–1928)
- Janko Jesenský (1874–1945)
- Ľudmila Podjavorinská (1872–1951)

=== Modernism (1905–1918) ===
- Ivan Krasko (1876–1958)
- Janko Jesenský (1874–1945)
- Martin Orgoník-Kunovský (1887–1916)

=== Between the World Wars (1918–1948) ===
- Štefan Krčméry (1892–1955)
- Martin Rázus (1888–1937)
- Ján Poničan (1902–1978)
- Peter Jilemnický (1901–1949)
- Laco Novomeský (1904–1976)
- Fraňo Kráľ (1903–1955)
- Maša Haľamová (1908–1995)
- Štefan Žáry (1918–2007)
- Ján Brezina (1917–1997)

=== Contemporary (since the 1960s) ===
- Krista Bendová (1923 –1988)
- Miroslav Válek (1927–1991)
- Milan Rúfus (1928–2009)
- Ľubomír Feldek (born 1936)
- Milan Richter (born 1948)
- Jana Kantorová-Báliková (born 1950)
- Juraj Kuniak (born 1955)
- Dana Podracká (born 1954)
- Viera Prokešová (1957–2008)
- Pavol Hudák (1959–2011)
- Eva Kováčová (1951–2010)

=== Contemporary poetry (since 1995) ===
- Radovan Brenkus (born 1974)
- Radoslav Rochallyi (born 1980)

== See also ==
- List of national poetries
- Slovak prose
