= List of Slovak women writers =

This is a list of women writers who were born in Slovakia or whose writings are closely associated with that country.

== B ==
- Krista Bendová (1923 –1988), writer, poet, journalist, known for works for children and young adults
- Jaroslava Blažková (1933–2017), novelist, short story writer, children's writer, journalist

== F ==
- Margita Figuli (1909–1995), novelist, children's writer, translator

== H ==
- Maša Haľamová (1908–1995), modernist poet
- Mila Haugová (born 1942), Hungarian-born Slovak poet, literary critic, editor, translator

== J ==
- Vilma Jamnická (1906–2008), actress, astrological writer

== L ==
- Anna Lacková-Zora (1899–1988), poet, novelist, short story writer
- Katarína Lazarová (1914 –1995), novelist, translator
- Ľuba Lesná (born 1954), journalist, novelist, playwright

== M ==
- Božena Mačingová (1922 –2017), writer, author of books for children and young adults

== P ==
- Hana Ponická (1922–2007), dissident writer, playwright

== R ==
- Kristína Royová (1860–1936), widely translated novelist, poet, children's writer

== T ==
- Timrava, pen name of Božena Slančíková (1867–1951), poet, novelist, short story writer, playwright

== Z ==
- Hana Zelinová (1914–2004), novelist, short story writer, playwright
- Zuzka Zguriška (1900–1984), novelist, playwright, translator

== See also ==
- List of Slovak authors
- List of women writers
