= Jan Brezina =

Jan Brezina may refer to:

- Ján Brezina (1917–1997), Slovak poet, literary historian and theoretician
- Jan Březina (born 1954), Czech politician
