= Brenkus =

Brenkus is a Slavic surname. Notable people with the surname include:

- Adam Brenkus (born 1999), Slovak footballer
- John Brenkus (1971–2025), American producer, director, and television personality
- Radovan Brenkus (born 1974), Slovak writer, translator and critic
