= Blaho Uhlár =

Slovak theatre director (1951–2024)

- Born: 26 August 1951; Prešov, Czechoslovakia
- Died: 13 July 2024 (aged 72); Bratislava, Slovakia
- Known for: Co-founder of the Stoka theatre
- Awards: DOSKY (1998)
- Honours: Order of Ľudovít Štúr, 3rd class (2024)

Blaho Uhlár (26 August 1951 – 13 July 2024) was a Slovak theatre director and dramaturge, co-founder of the Stoka independent theater in Bratislava. He was known as the leading figure of the Slovak avant-garde theatre and underground culture.

== Biography ==
Blaho Uhlár was born on 26 August 1951 in Prešov. He grew up in Ružomberok. From 1969 to 1974 he studied theatre directing at the Academy of Performing Arts in Bratislava. Following graduation, he worked as a director at the Theatre for Children and Youth in Trnava and the Ukrainian national Theatre in Prešov.

In spite of being a formally educated theatre director, Uhlár did not have a high opinion of the quality of traditional theatre institutions. He saw much greater potential for creativity in amateur theatre bodies, such as the DISK ensemble he led in Trnava. In the late 1980 Uhlár and the visual artist Miloš Karásek published two manifestos calling for abandonment of the traditional theatre structure and written scripts in favor of improvisation. According to an article in New Theatre Quarterly, the avant-garde forms of theater developed by Uhlár formed an integral part of the cultural dissent environment, which served as a "herald" of the Velvet Revolution, that ended the communist dictatorship in Czechoslovakia. Another article in the Theatre Survey, argues the work of Uhlár and other post-modern artists played an important role in defining the identity of Slovakia during the dissolution of Czechoslovakia.

In the early 1990s, Uhlár and Karásek established the Stoka theatre in Bratislava to realize their ideas. The theatre achieved a degree of success with the audience and, in later years, also with critics. However, it constantly struggled with economic sustainability and evictions from rental premises. For example, in 2006, the long-term seat of Stoka was demolished to make way for a parking lot for the nearby shopping mall development.

Frustration with his complicated relationship with the traditional cultural institutions and state cultural funding, led Uhlár to become increasingly politically engaged. In 1999 he published a libertarianian manifesto Kde leží naša bieda (Where is the source of our poverty) in the Sme daily, advocating for a drastic reduction of government size as a means to combat the oppression of small businesses and independent creators by the government and big corporations. The actress Lucia Piussi, a long-term member of Stoka, wrote in an obituary for Uhlár, that in his later years he was "tired of life" due to the constant struggles with securing funding for his theatre.

== Recognitions ==
In 1998, Uhlár was awarded the DOSKY Award for best directing for the play Tváre (Faces). In January 2024 Uhlár was awarded the Order of Ľudovít Štúr, 3rd class, by the president of Slovakia Zuzana Čaputová, for his lifelong contribution to development of culture and arts in Slovakia.

== Death ==
Uhlár died in Bratislava on 13 July 2024, at the age of 72. His death was announced by the publicist Koloman Kertész Bagala.
