= Juraj Kuniak =

Slovak poet and writer

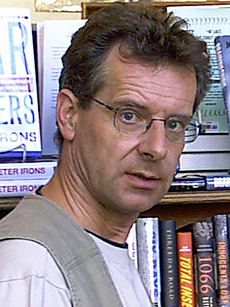
Juraj Kuniak

Juraj Kuniak (born 2 July 1955) is a Slovak poet and writer. He was born in Košice, Slovakia.

== Works ==
=== Poetry ===
- 1983 – Premietanie na viečka
- 1994 – Kúsok svetového priestoru
- 1995 – Blúdivý nerv
- 2001 – Cor cordi
- 2008 – Čiara horizontu
- 2008 – Zápisník lyrického spravodajcu / Notebook of a Lyrical Correspondent
- 2012 – Lamium album (co-author: Ján Kudlička)
- 2015 – Za mestom
- 2016 – Rosa mystica (co-author: Ján Kudlička)

=== Co-author of poetry ===
- 2011 – Mávnutie krídel. 42 slovenských haiku (co-authors: Erik Jakub Groch, Mila Haugová, Daniel Hevier, Igor Hochel, Karol Chmel, Rudolf Jurolek, Ivan Kadlečík, Anna Ondrejková, Dana Podracká, Ján Zambor)
- 2012 – Proglas. Preklady a básnické interpretácie (co-authors: Konštantín Filozof, Eugen Pauliny, Viliam Turčány, Ľubomír Feldek, Ján Buzássy, Mila Haugová, Ján Zambor, Katarína Džunková, Daniel Hevier, Erik Ondrejička, Anna Ondrejková, Rudolf Jurolek, Dana Podracká)

=== Collected edition of poetry ===
- 2004 – Skalná ruža – a triptych includes Premietanie na viečka, Blúdivý nerv and Kúsok svetového priestoru
- 2019 – Amonit – selected poems 2008-2016

=== Translations of poetry ===
- 2013 – Walt Whitman – Song of Myself – translation into Slovak language: Spev o mne
- 2019 – Walt Whitman – Song of Myself – translation into Slovak language: Spev o mne (Second, revised edition)
- 2019 – Robert Hass – Time and Materials – translation into Slovak language: Čas a materiály

=== Prose ===
- 1991 – Pán Černovský
- 1993 – Súkromný skanzen – Etudy o etniku
- 2002 – Nadmorská výška 23 rokov
- 2003 – Púť k sebe
- 2008 – Mystérium krajiny / Mystery of Landscape
- 2013 – Dhaulágirí – Biela hora (co-author: photographer Marián Kováč)
- 2018 – Nepálsky diptych: Dhaulágirí – Biela hora & Makalu – Čierny obor (co-author: photographer Marián Kováč)

=== Books in other languages ===
- 1989 – Podívej se na básničku, Czech
- 2004 – Nadmořská výška 23 let, Czech
- 2004 – Mister Cernovsky, English
- 2005 – Man in the wind, English
- 2006 – A Bit of the World's Space, English
- 2007 – Cor cordi, English
- 2008 – The line of the horizon, Hungarian, German, Czech, Polish, Finnish, Swedish, Norwegian, Danish, English, Flemish, Dutch, French, Italian, Castilian, Portuguese, Spanish, Japanese, Chinese, Mongolian, Russian, Arabic, Hebrew, Greek, Macedonian, Ukrainian, Slovenian
- 2008 – Notebook of a Lyrical Correspondent, English
- 2010 – Nervus vagus, Czech
- 2012 – Lamium album, Polish, German, English
- 2013 – Dhaulagiri - Vitt berg, Swedish
- 2016 – Rosa mystica, Polish, German, English
- 2019 – Amonit, Belarusian
- 2019 – Amonit, Serbian
