= TESE =

TESE or Tase may refer to:

== Acronyms ==
- 2-hydroxyhexa-2,4-dienoate hydratase, an enzyme encoded by the tesE gene
- Testicular sperm extraction, a surgical procedure to remove sperm from a testis
- Thorn-EMI Screen Entertainment, former name of British EMI Films

== Other uses ==
- Tese language, an Eastern Sudanic language
- teše, a verb stem in the morphological classification of Czech verbs
