= Prokeš =

Prokeš (feminine: Prokešová) is a Czech and Slovak family name and may refer to:

- Ladislav Prokeš (1884–1966), Czech chess champion and scholar
- Zdeněk Prokeš (1953–2024), Czech footballer
- Katka Prokešová (born 1976), Slovak trampolinist
- Viera Prokešová (1957–2008), Slovak writer and translator
