= Morphological classification of Czech verbs =

Czech verbs can be classified (arranged in classes) in several ways. The verbal classes can be characterised in terms of their morphological properties. Verbs that belong to the same class typically accept the same range of suffixes (endings). This article concerns the morphological classification of the Czech verbs and the formation of their admissible forms (including, to some extent, literary and archaic ones).

The first attempts to classify Czech verbs from the morphological point of view were made in the 16th century, for example in Matouš Benešovský's Grammatica Bohemica from 1577. Vavřinec Benedikt Nudožerský in his work Grammaticæ bohemicæ libri duo (1603) distinguished four classes according to the present indicative ending of the 1st person singular: I. – ám, II. – ím, III. – u, IV. – i. Pavel Doležal in his Grammatica Slavico-Bohemica (1746), inspired by the Latin grammar, for the first time classified the Czech verbs according to the infinitive: I. vol-a-ti (vocāre), II. mil-ova-ti (amāre), III. lež-e-ti (iacēre), IV. uč-i-ti (docēre), V. pí-ti (bibere), VI. hr-nou-ti (sēmovēre, āmovēre) and, moreover, verba anomala, i.e. an arbitrary list of several tens of "irregular" verbs including the athematic ones.

The Czech (and generally Slavic) verbs have two distinct stems: the present stem (used in forming present indicative, imperative and present transgressive) and the infinitive stem (infinitive, past and passive participles, past transgressive and verbal noun). Both stems are equally important and frequent, which means there are two basic possibilities of systematic classification of the Czech (generally Slavic) verbs, based either on the present stems or on the infinitive stems. For comparison the Latin verbs have three distinct stems (present, perfect, supine) and their classification is traditionally based on the present stem (I. vocā-, II. tenē-, III. leg-(ĕ,ǐ)-, IV. audī-), the infinitive itself is derived from the present stem (vocāre, tenēre, légĕre, audīre).

As there are six types of the infinitive stem, there are also six corresponding classes (Franz Miklosich, Formenlehre der slawischen Sprachen, 1856 and Jan Gebauer, Historická mluvnice jazyka českého, 1898), usually arranged in the following manner: I. nés-ti, vés-ti (*ved-ti), péci (*pek-ti), krý-ti, etc. (no stem suffix), II. tisk-nou-ti, III. slyš-e-ti, trp-ě-ti, um-ě-ti, IV. pros-i-ti, V. děl-a-ti, sáz-e-ti (*sad-ja-ti), láti (*la-ja-ti), bráti (*bьr-a-ti), kov-a-ti, VI. kup-ova-ti. This classification is very similar to the Doležal's one (though the class order is different).

The classification based on the present stem (e.g. August Schleicher, Formenlehre der kirchenslawischen Sprache, 1852, and esp. August Leskien, Handbuch der altbulgarischen Sprache, 2nd ed., 1886) distinguishes five classes, the classes I-IV have a distinct present stem suffix: I. nes-e-, ved-e-, jьm-e-, etc., II. dvig-ne-, III. kry-je-, *tes-je-, dêl-a-je-, *sad-ja-je-, kup-u-je-, IV. chval-i-, trъp-i-, V. *jes-, *dad-, *jad-, *vêd- (athematic consonantal present stems).

The system presented in this article is a system based on the Leskien's classification, adapted to the contemporary Czech language. The main differences are: a) the few athematic (and highly irregular) verbs are treated separately, b) the contracted děl-á- < *dêl-a-je- has moved from the class III to a new class V, c) the contracted sáz-í- < *sad-ja-je- has moved from the class III to the class IV.

== Class I (-e-) ==
The indicative present stem suffix is -e- (nes-e-š, nes-e, nes-e-me, nes-e-te) except the 1st person sing. (nes-u < *nes-ǫ) and the 3rd person plur. (nes-ou < ^{†}nes-ú < *nes-ǫ-tъ).

Class I — endings of the present forms
	sing.	plur.
ind. pres.	1. -u 2. -eš 3. -e	1. -eme 2. -ete 3. -ou
imp.^{1)}	2. 3. -Ø	1. -me 2. -te
imp.^{2)}	2. 3. -i	1. -ěme^{3)} 2. -ěte^{3)}
pres. transgr.	m. -a f. n. -ouc	m. f. n. -ouce

^{1)} reduced imperative endings used in most cases: nes (but nesiž), nesme, neste
^{2)} full imperative endings used if the root has no vowel: jmi, jměme, jměte
^{3)} after some consonants the original iotation has been lost, e.g. třete < ^{†}třěte (so the modern imperative forms are undistinguishable from the present indicative forms)

The verbs of this class are divided in three groups according to the infinitive stem.

Class I — division
Group	
1	no infinitive stem suffix, infinitive stem (= primary stem) ends in a consonant
2	no infinitive stem suffix, infinitive stem ends in a vowel
3	infinitive stem suffix -a-

=== Group 1 ===
The infinitive stem has no suffix and is equal to the primary stem that ends in a consonant (nes-, vez-, ved-, plet-, pek-, moh-, záb-).

==== nese – nesl – nésti ====
The primary stem ends in s or z (nes-, vez-).

pers.	ind. pres. sing.	ind. pres. plur.	imper. sing.	imper. plur.
1.	nesu	neseme	—	nesme
2.	neseš	nesete	nes	neste
3.	nese	nesou	nes (nesiž)	—
	participles			
past	nesl nesla neslo		nesli nesly nesla	
pass.	nesen nesena neseno		neseni neseny nesena	
	transgressives			
pres.	nesa	nesouc	nesouce	
past	(od)nes	(od)nesši	(od)nesše	
	infinitive		verbal noun	
	nésti		nesení	

^{Other verbs of this type}
inf.	ind. pres.	imper.	pres. tr.	part.	past tr.
pásti	pasu, paseš	pas, paste	pasa	pásl, pasen	(pro)pás
třásti	třesu ∥ třasu^{1)}, třeseš	třes, třeste	třesa ∥ třasa^{1)}	třásl, třesen	(za)třás
vézti	vezu, vezeš	vez, vezte	veza	vezl, vezen	(od)vez
lézti	lezu, lezeš	lez, lezte	leza	lezl, lezen	(vy)lez
hrýzti^{2)}	hryzu, hryzeš	hryz, hryzte	hryza	hryzl, hryzen	(vy)hryz

^{1)} for třesu ↔ třasu, etc. see Root vowel mutation (přísti)
^{2)} hrýzti (hryze) is archaic („svědomí je hryze“, OCz „črvie mě hryzú“ = me vermes rodunt) → replaced by hryzati (hryže), obs. hrýzati (hrýže)

==== vede – vedl – vésti ====
The primary stem ends in d or t (ved-, plet-).
The infinitive ends in -sti (vésti < *ved-ti, plésti < *plet-ti).

pers.	ind. pres. sing.	ind. pres. plur.	imper. sing.	imper. plur.
1.	vedu	vedeme	—	veďme
2.	vedeš	vedete	veď	veďte
3.	vede	vedou	veď (vediž)	—
	participles			
past	vedl vedla vedlo		vedli vedly vedla	
pass.	veden vedena vedeno		vedeni vedeny vedena	
	transgressives			
pres.	veda	vedouc	vedouce	
past	(od)ved	(od)vedši	(od)vedše	
	infinitive		verbal noun	
	vésti < *ved-ti		vedení	

^{Some other verbs of this type}
inf.	ind. pres.	imper.	pres. tr.	part.	past tr.
krásti	kradu, kradeš	kraď, kraďte	krada	kradl, kraden	(u)krad
housti	hudu, hudeš	huď, huďte	huda	hudl, huden	(za)hud
břísti	bředu, bředeš	břeď, břeďte	bředa	bředl, bředen	(za)břed
plésti	pletu, pleteš	pleť, pleťte	pleta	pletl, pleten	(u)plet
mésti	metu, meteš	meť, meťte	meta	metl, meten	(za)met
másti	matu, mateš	mať, maťte	mata	mátl, maten	(z)mát
hnísti	hnětu, hněteš	hněť, hněťte	hněta	hnětl, hněten	(u)hnět
růsti^{1)}	rostu, rosteš	rosť, rosťte	rosta	rostl, (rosten)	(vy)rost

^{1)} růsti < *orst-ti: pass. part. rosten is not in use, there is a noun růst instead of rostení

==== peče – pekl ~ péci ====
- The primary stem ends in k or h (pek-, moh- < *mog-).
- The infinitive ends in -ci (péci < *pek-ti, moci < *mog-ti).

pers.	ind. pres. sing.	ind. pres. plur.	imper. sing.	imper. plur.
1.	peku	pečeme	—	pecme
2.	pečeš	pečete	pec	pecte
3.	peče	pekou	pec (peciž)	—
	participles			
past	pekl pekla peklo		pekli pekly pekla	
pass.	pečen pečena pečeno		pečeni pečeny pečena	
	transgressives			
pres.	peka	pekouc	pekouce	
past	(u)pek	(u)pekši	(u)pekše	
	infinitive		verbal noun	
	péci < *pek-ti		pečení	

Modern Czech uses the forms peču, pečou, peč, péct instead of the archaic (and very rare) peku, pekou, pec, péci and můžu, můžou, (-mož), moct instead of mohu, mohou, -moz, moci.

^{Other verbs of this type}
inf.	ind. pres.	imper.	pres. tr.	part.	past tr.	noun
téci	teku, tečeš	tec, tecte	teka	tekl, tečen	(vy)tek	tečení
tlouci	tluku, tlučeš	tluc, tlucte	tluka	tloukl, tlučen	(vy)tlouk	tlučení
říci	řku, řčeš^{1)}	rci, rcete^{1)}	řka^{1)}	řekl, řečen	(do)řek	řečení
moci	mohu, můžeš	-moz, -mozte	moha	mohl, možen	(vy)moh	-možení
stříci (se)	střehu, střežeš	střez, střezte	střeha	střehl, střežen	(vy)střeh	střežení
stříci^{2)}	střihu, střižeš	střiz, střizte	střiha	střihl, střižen	(vy)střih	střižení
žíci^{3)}	žhu, žžeš	žzi, žzete	žha	žehl, žžen	(se)žeh	žžení

^{1)} říci: the present stem forms řku, řčeš, rci, etc. are bookish ("…rci mi pravdu a víc nic, jest v Gilead balzám těchy…") → replaced by the present stem forms of -řeknouti (the infinitive only with a prefix): řeknu, řekneš, řekni and -řknouti (prefixed): -řknu, -řkneš, -řkni
^{2)} arch. stříci (střiže) → replaced by stříhati (stříhá), -střihnouti (-střihne)
^{3)} arch. žíci (žže) → replaced by other verbs: žhnouti (žhne), -žehnouti (-žehne), páliti (pálí)

==== zebe • zábl – zábsti ====
- The primary stem ends in b or p (zeb-, tep-).
- The infinitive ends in -s-ti (inserted s).

pers.	ind. pres. sing.	ind. pres. plur.	imper. sing.	imper. plur.
1.	zebu	zebeme	—	zebme
2.	zebeš	zebete	zeb	zebte
3.	zebe	zebou	zeb (zebiž)	—
	participles			
past	zábl zábla záblo		zábli zábly zábla	
pass.	(zeben, zebena, zebeno)		(zebeni, zebeny, zebena)	
	transgressives			
pres.	zeba	zebouc	zebouce	
past	(za)záb	(za)zábši	(za)zábše	
	infinitive		verbal noun	
	zábsti		zebení	

Note: In a similar conjugation, now obsolete, the primary stem ended in v, e.g. žíti (živ-e) < *živti (cf. živoucí, život) → replaced by žíti (ži-je), similarly pléti (plev-e) < *plevti (cf. plevel) → replaced by plíti (ple-je), see Class III.
The verbs of this type are obsolete except zábsti that is still in use.

^{Archaic (now obsolete) verbs of this type}
inf.	ind. pres.	imper.	pres. tr.	part.	past tr.
hřébsti^{1)}	hřebu, hřebeš	hřeb, hřebte	hřeba	hřebl, hřeben	(po)hřeb
skúbsti^{2)}	skubu, skubeš	skub, skubte	skuba	skubl, skuben	(vy)skub
dlúbsti^{3)}	dlubu, dlubeš	dlub, dlubte	dluba	dlubl, dluben	(vy)dlub
tépsti^{4)}	tepu, tepeš	tep, tepte	tepa	tepl, tepen	(vy)tep

^{1)} arch. hřébsti or hřésti (hřebe) → replaced by pohřbívati (pohřbívá), pohřbíti (pohřbí)
^{2)} arch. skúbsti or skústi (skube) → replaced by škubati (škube)
^{3)} arch. dlúbsti (dlube) → replaced by dlabati (dlabe), dloubati (dloubá); still used in some dialects ("proč do toho dlubeš?")
^{4)} arch. tépsti (tepe) → replaced by tepati (tepe)

=== Group 2 ===
The infinitive stem has no distinctive suffix and ends in a vowel (ja-, tře-, mle-).

==== jme • jal – jíti (-níti) → jmouti ====
- The original stem ended in m or n (*em-, *pen-, *dom-).
- The present stems: jme- < *j-ьm-e-, pne- < *pьn-e-, dme- < *dъm-e-, etc.
- The original infinitive: *j-ę-ti < *em-, *pę-ti < *pen-, *dǫ-ti < *dom-, etc.

pers.	ind. pres. sing.	ind. pres. plur.	imper. sing.	imper. plur.
1.	jmu	jmeme	—	jměme
2.	jmeš	jmete	jmi	jměte
3.	jme	jmou	jmi (jmiž)	—
	participles			
past	jal jala jalo		jali jaly jala	
pass.	jat jata jato		jati jaty jato	
	transgressives			
pres.	jma	jmouc	jmouce	
past	(za)jav	(za)javši	(za)javše	
	infinitive		verbal noun	
	jíti (-níti) < ^{†}jieti < *jęti → jmouti		(za)jetí, (od)nětí → (na)jmutí	

N.B. The infinitive jmouti (see also Class II) is a newly created form as the original infinitive jíti (jme) < *jęti can be confused with the homonymous infinitive jíti (jde) < *iti. The original infinitive jíti (after some prefixes -níti) is mostly preserved in the prefixed verbs where the confusion is not an issue, e.g. vzíti (vezme) vs. vzejíti (vzejde), odníti (odejme) vs. odejíti (odejde), vyníti (vyjme) vs. vyjíti (vyjde), etc. However new infinitives like odejmouti, vyjmouti are also in use (vzíti is an exception).

^{Other verbs of this types}
inf.	ind. pres.	imper.	pres. tr.	part.	past tr.	noun
vzíti	vezmu < *vъz-ьmǫ	vezmi, vezměte	—	vzal, vzat	vzav	vzetí
-číti	-čnu < *čьnǫ	-čni, -čněte	-čna	-čal, -čat	(po)čav	-četí
píti^{1)} → pnouti	pnu < *pьnǫ	pni, pněte	pna	pjal, pjat	(se)pjav	pětí
títi → tnouti	tnu < *tьnǫ	tni, tněte	tna	ťal, ťat	(s)ťav	tětí
žíti → žnouti	žnu < ^{†}žňu < *žьnjǫ	žni, žněte	žna	žal, žat	(na)žav	žetí
míti^{2)} → mnouti	mnu < *mьnǫ	mni, mněte	mna	—	—	—
klíti^{3)} → klnouti	klnu < *klьnǫ	klň, klňte	klna	klel, klet (klat)	(pro)klev	kletí
douti^{4)} → dmouti	dmu < *dъmǫ	dmi, dměte	dma	dul, dut	(na)duv	dutí

^{1)} The infinitive pnouti (see Class II) is a newly created form as the original infinitive píti (pne) < ^{†}pieti < *pęti can be confused with the homonymous infinitive píti (pije). In contemporary Czech the original infinitive (píti) is not in use.
^{2)} The original verb míti (mne) < ^{†}mieti < *męti (the infinitive of which could be confused with the athematic verb míti < ^{†}jmieti) has been replaced by a newly created verb mnouti (mne) with identical present stem forms (see Class II).
^{3)} The original verb ^{†}kléti (klne) < *klęti has been replaced by two newly created verbs: klnouti (klne) with identical present stem forms (see Class II) and klíti (kleje) with identical infinitive stem forms (see Class III). The new verbs have slightly different meaning.
^{4)} The original verb ^{†}dúti (dme) < *dǫti has been replaced by two newly created verbs: dmouti (dme) with identical present stem forms (see Class II) and douti (duje) with identical infinitive stem forms (see Class III). The new verbs have different meaning ("hruď se dme", "vítr duje").

==== tře • třel – tříti ====
- The original stem ended in r (*ter-).

pers.	ind. pres. sing.	ind. pres. plur.	imper. sing.	imper. plur.
1.	tru ~ třu	třeme	—	třeme
2.	třeš	třete	tři	třete
3.	tře	trou ~ třou	tři (třiž)	—
	participles			
past	třel třela třelo		třeli třely třela	
pass.	třen třena třeno		třeni třeny třena	
	transgressives			
pres.	tra	trouc	trouce	
past	(se)třev	(se)třevši	(se)třevše	
	infinitive		verbal noun	
	tříti < ^{†}třieti < *terti		tření	

^{Other verbs of this type}
inf.	ind. pres.	imper.	pres. tr.	part.	past tr.	noun
dříti	dru dřu, dřeš	dři, dřete	dra	dřel, dřen	(za)dřev	dření
příti	pru přu, přeš	při, přete	pra	přel, přen	(za)přev	pření
mříti	mru mřu, mřeš	mři, mřete	mra	mřel, mřen	(ze)mřev	mření
vříti	vru vřu, vřeš	vři, vřete	vra	vřel, vřen	(vy)vřev	vření
-stříti	-stru -střu, -střeš	-stři, -střete	–	-střel, -střen	(pro)střev	-stření
-zříti	-zru -zřu, -zřeš	-zři, -zřete	–	-zřel, -zřen	(po)zřev	-zření

==== mele • mlel – mlíti ====
- The original stem ended in l (*mel-).

pers.	ind. pres. sing.	ind. pres. plur.	imper. sing.	imper. plur.
1.	melu	meleme	—	melme
2.	meleš	melete	mel	melte
3.	mele	melou	mel (meliž)	—
	participles			
past	mlel mlela mlelo		mleli mlely mlela	
pass.	mlet mleta mleto ~ mlen mlena mleno		mleti mlety mleta ~ mleni mleny mlena	
	transgressives			
pres.	mela	melouc	melouce	
past	(u)mlev	(u)mlevši	(u)mlevše	
	infinitive		verbal noun	
	mlíti < ^{†}mléti < *melti		mletí ~ mlení	

The forms mlen, mlena, etc. and mlení are less common.
There are no other verbs of this type except mlíti in contemporary Czech.

=== Group 3 ===
The infinitive stem suffix is -a- (br-a-, zv-a-, maz-a-).

==== bere • bral – bráti ====
pers.	ind. pres. sing.	ind. pres. plur.	imper. sing.	imper. plur.
1.	beru	bereme béřeme	—	berme beřme
2.	bereš béřeš	berete béřete	ber beř	berte beřte
3.	bere béře	berou	beř, beřiž	—
	participles			
past	bral brala bralo		brali braly brala	
pass.	brán brána bráno		bráni brány brána	
	transgressives			
pres.	bera	berouc	berouce	
past	(se)brav	(se)bravši	(se)bravše	
	infinitive	inf. stem	verbal noun	—
	bráti (sebrati)	br-a- < *bьr-a-	braní (sebrání)	

The present stem forms béřeš, beř, etc. are archaic.

Sample verbs
inf.	ind. pres.	imper.	pres. tr.	part.	past tr.	noun
dráti	deru, dereš déřeš	der, derte deř, deřte	dera	dral, drán	(se)drav	draní
práti	peru, pereš péřeš	per, perte peř, peřte	pera	pral, prán	(se)prav	praní
žráti	žeru, žereš žéřeš/žířeš	žer, žerte žeř, žeřte	žera	žral, žrán	(se)žrav	žraní
hnáti	ženu, ženeš	žeň, žeňte	žena	hnal, hnán	(se)hnav	hnaní

==== zve • zval ~ zváti ====
pers.	ind. pres. sing.	ind. pres. plur.	imper. sing.	imper. plur.
1.	zvu zovu	zveme zůveme	—	zvěme
2.	zveš zůveš	zvete zůvete	zvi zovi	zvěte
3.	zve zůve	zvou zovou	zovi, zoviž	—
	participles			
past	zval zvala zvalo		zvali zvaly zvala	
pass.	zván zvána zváno		zváni zvány zvána	
	transgressives			
pres.	zva zova	zvouc zovouc	zvouce zovouce	
past	(vy)zvav	(vy)zvavši	(vy)zvavše	
	infinitive	inf. stem	verbal noun	—
	zváti (vyzvati)	zv-a-	zvaní (vyzvání)	

The present stem forms zovu, zůveš, zovi, zova, etc. are archaic ("moudrost sama k sobě hloupé zůve").

Sample verbs
inf.	ind. pres.	imper.	pres. tr.	part.	past tr.	noun
řváti	řvu, řveš řevu, řéveš	řvi, řvěte řevi	řva řeva	řval, (se)řván	(se)řvav	řvaní
cpáti	cpu, cpeš	cpi, cpěte	cpa	cpal, cpán	(na)cpav	cpaní
ssáti	ssu, sseš	ssi, ssete	ssa	ssal, ssán	(vy)ssav	ssaní
tkáti	tku, tčeš	tci, tcete	tka	tkal, tkán	(u)tkav	tkaní

==== maže • mazal ~ mazati ====
pers.	ind. pres. sing.	ind. pres. plur.	imper. sing.	imper. plur.
1.	maži, mažu	mažeme	—	mažme
2.	mažeš	mažete	maž	mažte
3.	maže	maží, mažou	maž, mažiž	—
	participles			
past	mazal mazala mazalo		mazali mazaly mazala	
pass.	mazán mazána mazáno		mazáni mazány mazána	
	transgressives			
pres.	maže	mažíc	mažíce	
past	(vy)mazav	(vy)mazavši	(vy)mazavše	
	infinitive	inf. stem	verbal noun	—
	mazati	maz-a-	mazání	

Sample verbs
inf.	ind. pres.	imper.	pres. tr.	part.	past tr.	noun
vázati	váži/vážu, vážeš víži, vížeš	važ, važte	váže	vázal, vázán	(s)vázav	vázání
kázati	káži/kážu, kážeš	kaž, kažte	káže	kázal, kázán	(při)kázav	kázání

== Class II (-ne-) ==
The indicative present stem suffix is -ne- (tisk-ne-š, tisk-ne, tisk-ne-me, tisk-ne-te) except the 1st person sing. (tisk-nu < *tisk-nǫ) and the 3rd person plur. (tisk-nou < ^{†}tisk-nú < *tisk-nǫ-tъ).

Class II — endings of the present forms
	sing.	plur.
ind. pres.	1. -nu 2. -neš 3. -ne	1. -neme 2. -nete 3. -nou
imp.	2. 3. -ni	1. -něme 2. -něte
imp.	2. 3. -ň	1. -ňme 2. -ňte
pres. transgr.	m. -na f. n. -nouc	m. f. n. -nouce

The verbs of this class are divided in two groups according to the primary stem ending.

Class II — division
Group	
1	primary stem ends in a consonant (except syllabic r or l)
2	primary stem ends in a vowel or syllabic r or syllabic l

=== Group 1 ===
The primary stem ends in a consonant except syllabic r or l (tisk-, h-).

==== tiskne • tiskl – tisknouti ====
pers.	ind. pres. sing.	ind. pres. plur.	imper. sing.	imper. plur.
1.	tisknu	tiskneme	—	tiskněme
2.	tiskneš	tisknete	tiskni	tiskněte
3.	tiskne	tisknou	tiskni (tiskniž)	—
	participles			
past	tiskl tiskla tisklo ~ tisknul tisknula tisknulo		tiskli tiskly tiskla ~ tisknuli tisknuly tisknula	
pass.	tištěn tištěna tištěno ~ tisknut tisknuta tisknuto		tištěni tištěny tištěna ~ tisknuti tisknuty tisknuta	
	transgressives			
pres.	tiskna	tisknouc	tisknouce	
past	(vy)tisk ~ (s)tisknuv	(vy)tiskši ~ (s)tisknuvši	(vy)tiskše ~ (s)tisknuvše	
	infinitive		verbal noun	
	tisknouti		tištění ~ (s)tisknutí	

The forms tisknul, tisknut, (s)tisknuv, tisknutí are later created infinitive stem forms (formed regularly by using the suffix -nu-). Literary Czech prefers the original shorter forms (without the suffix -nu-) if they are in use (e.g. "dveře jsou zamčeny" is better than "dveře jsou zamknuty"). However some verbs use prevalently or exclusively the infinitive stem forms with the suffix -nu-. In some cases there is a difference in usage (e.g. "kniha je tištěna", but "ruka je tisknuta").

^{Other verbs of this type}
inf.	ind. pres.	imper.	part.	past tr.	noun
sednouti	sednu, sedneš	sedni	sedl, sednut	(u)sednuv	sednutí
říznouti	říznu, řízneš	řízni	řízl, říznut	(vy)říznuv	říznutí
-mknouti	-mknu, -mkneš	-mkni	-mkl, (za)mčen ~ (při)mknut	(při)mknuv	(za)mčení ~ (vy)mknutí
hnouti	hnu, hneš	hni	hnul, hnut	(po)hnuv	hnutí
lnouti	lnu, lneš	lni	lnul, lnut	(při)lnuv	lnutí
-snouti	-snu, -sneš	-sni	-snul, -snut	(ze)snuv	-snutí

==== pne • pnul, pjal – pnouti ====
pers.	ind. pres. sing.	ind. pres. plur.	imper. sing.	imper. plur.
1.	pnu	pneme	—	pněme
2.	pneš	pnete	pni	pněte
3.	pne	pnou	pni (pniž)	—
	participles			
past	pnul pnula pnulo ~ pjal pjala pjalo		pnuli pnuly pnula ~ pjali pjaly pjala	
pass.	pnut pnuta pnuto ~ pjat pjata pjato		pnuti pnuty pnuta ~ pjati pjaty pjata	
	transgressives			
pres.	pna	pnouc	pnouce	
past	(u)pnuv ~ (se)pjav	(u)pnuvši ~ (se)pjavši	(u)pnuvše ~ (se)pjavše	
	infinitive		verbal noun	
	pnouti (^{†}pieti < *pęti)		pnutí ~ (na)pětí	

^{Other verbs of this type}
inf.	orig. inf.	ind. pres.	imper.	part.	past tr.	noun
mnouti	^{†}mieti < *męti	mnu, mneš	mni	mnul, mnut	(pro)mnuv	mnutí
dmouti	^{†}dúti < *dǫti	dmu, dmeš	dmi	dmul, dmut	(na)dmuv	dmutí
tnouti ↔ títi	^{†}tieti < *tęti	tnu, tneš	tni	ťal -tnul, ťat -tnut	(s)ťav -tnuv	(s)tětí -tnutí
jmouti	^{†}jieti < *jęti	jmu, jmeš	jmi	jal -jmul, jat -jmut	(při)jav -jmuv	(při)jetí ~ (na)jmutí

=== Group 2 ===
The primary stem ends in a vowel or syllabic r or syllabic l (ply-, tr-, kl-).

==== plyne • plynul – plynouti ====
pers.	ind. pres. sing.	ind. pres. plur.	imper. sing.	imper. plur.
1.	plynu	plyneme	—	plyňme
2.	plyneš	plynete	plyň	plyňte
3.	plyne	plynou	plyň (plyniž)	—
	participles			
past	plynul plynula plynulo		plynuli plynuly plynula	
pass.	plynut plynuta plynuto		plynuti plynuty plynuta	
	transgressives			
pres.	plyna	plynouc	plynouce	
past	(u)plynuv	(u)plynuvši	(u)plynuvše	
	infinitive		verbal noun	
	plynouti		plynutí	

^{Other verbs of this type}
inf.	ind. pres.	imper.	pres. tr.	part.	past tr.	noun
hynouti	hynu, hyneš	hyň, hyňte	hyna	hynul, hynut	(za)hynuv	hynutí
kynouti	kynu, kyneš	kyň, kyňte	kyna	kynul, kynut	(na)kynuv	kynutí
trnouti	trnu, trneš	trň, trňte	trna	trnul, trnut	(s)trnuv	trnutí
hrnouti	hrnu, hrneš	hrň, hrňte	hrna	hrnul, hrnut	(vy)hrnuv	hrnutí
klnouti	klnu, klneš	klň, klňte	klna	klnul, klnut	(za)klnuv	klnutí

== Class III (-je-) ==
The indicative present stem suffix is -je- (kry-je-š, kry-je, kry-je-me, kry-je-te) except the 1st person sing. (kry-ji < kry-ju < *kry-jǫ) and the 3rd person plur. (kry-jí < kry-jú < *kry-jǫ-tъ).

Class III - endings of the present forms
	sing.	plur.
ind. pres.	1. -ji 2. -ješ 3. -je	1. -jeme 2. -jete 3. -jí
pres. transgr.	m. -je f. n. -jíc	m. f. n. -jíce
imp.	2. 3. -j	1. -jme 2. -jte

This class is divided in two groups according to the infinitive stem (1. kry-l, 2. dar-ova-l).

=== Group 1 ===
The primary stem ends in a vowel (kry-, la-).

==== kryje • kryl ~ krýti ====
pers.	ind. pres. sg.	ind. pres. pl.	imper. sg.	imper. pl.
1.	kryji	kryjeme	—	kryjme
2.	kryješ	kryjete	kryj	kryjte
3.	kryje	kryjí	kryj, kryjž	—
	participles			
past	kryl kryla krylo		kryli kryly kryla	
pass.	kryt kryta kryto		kryti kryty kryta	
	transgressives			
pres.	kryje	kryjíc	kryjíce	
past	(za)kryv	(za)kryvši	(za)kryvše	
	infinitive	inf. stem	verbal noun	—
	krýti	kry-	krytí	

Common Czech uses the indicative present forms kryju and kryjou instead of kryji and kryjí.

Sample verbs
inf.	ind. pres.	imper.	pres. tr.	part.	past tr.	noun
píti	piji, piješ	pij, pijte	pije	pil, pit	(vy)piv	pití
bíti	biji, biješ	bij, bijte	bije	bil, bit	(roz)biv	bití
šíti	šiji, šiješ	šij, šijte	šije	šil, šit	(se)šiv	šití
žíti	žiji, žiješ	žij, žijte	žije	žil, žit	(pro)živ	žití
klíti < kléti	kleji, kleješ	klej, klejte	kleje	klel, klet	(pro)klev	kletí, klení
douti	duji, duješ	duj, dujte	duje	dul, dut	(za)duv	dutí

==== laje • lál ~ láti ====
pers.	ind. pres. sg.	ind. pres. pl.	imper. sg.	imper. pl.
1.	laji	lajeme	—	lajme
2.	laješ	lajete	laj	lajte
3.	laje	lají	laj, lajž	—
	participles			
past	lál lála lálo		láli lály lála	
pass.	lán lána láno		láni lány lána	
	transgressives			
pres.	laje	lajíc	lajíce	
past	(vy)láv	(vy)lávši	(vy)lávše	
	infinitive	inf. stem	verbal noun	—
	láti < *la-ja-ti	lá- < *la-ja-	lání	

Common Czech uses the indicative present forms laju and lajou instead of laji and lají.

Sample verbs
inf.	*inf.	ind. pres.	imper.	pres. tr.	part.	past tr.	noun
táti	*ta-ja-ti	taji, taješ	taj	taje	tál, tán (tát)	(roz)táv	tání
přáti	*prьj-a-ti	přeji, přeješ	přej	přeje	přál, přán	(po)přáv	přání
smáti se	*smьj-a-ti	směji, směješ	směj	směje	smál, smán (smát)	(u)smáv	smání (smátí)
síti	*sê-ja-ti	seji, seješ	sej	seje	sel sál, set sát	(za)sev	setí
váti	*vê-ja-ti	věji, věješ	věj	věje	vál, ván (vát)	(na)váv	vání (vátí)

=== Group 2 ===
The primary stem ends in a consonant except few verbs of foreign origin (e.g. kon-stru-uje-, kon-stru-ova-ti from Latin con-stru-ere).
The infinitive stem suffix is -ova- (dar-ova-l, dar-ova-ti).

==== daruje • daroval ~ darovati ====
pers.	ind. pres. sg.	ind. pres. pl.	imper. sg.	imper. pl.
1.	daruji	darujeme	—	darujme
2.	daruješ	darujete	daruj	darujte
3.	daruje	darují	daruj, darujž	—
	participles			
past	daroval darovala darovalo		darovali darovaly darovala	
pass.	darován darována darováno		darováni darovány darována	
	transgressives			
pres.	daruje	darujíc	darujíce	
past	(po)darovav	(po)darovavši	(po)darovavše	
	infinitive	inf. stem	verbal noun	—
	darovati	dar-ova-	darování	

Common Czech uses the forms daruju and darujou instead of daruji and darují.

== Class IV (-í-) ==
The indicative present stem suffix is -í- (pros-í-m, pros-í-š, pros-í, pros-í-me, pros-í-te, pros-í) except the 3rd person plur. of sázeti and uměti (sázejí, umějí).

Class IV – endings of the present forms
	sing.	plur.
ind. pres.	1. -ím 2. -íš 3. -í	1. -íme 2. -íte 3. -í/-ějí/-ejí
pres. transgr.	m. -ě/-e f. n. -íc	m. f. n. -íce
pres. transgr.	m. -ěje/-eje f. n. -ějíc/-ejíc	m. f. n. -ějíce/-ejíce
imp.	2. 3. -i	1. -ěme/-eme 2. -ěte/-ete
imp.	2. 3. -Ø	1. -me 2. -te
imp.	2. 3. -ěj/-ej	1. -ějme/-ejme 2. -ějte/-ejte

The verbs of this class are divided in two groups according to the infinitive stem (1. pros-i-l, 2. trp-ě-l/sáz-e-l).

=== Group 1 ===
The infinitive stem suffix is -i- (pros-i-l, pros-i-ti).

==== prosí • prosil ~ prositi ====
pers.	ind. pres. sg.	ind. pres. pl.	imper. sg.	imper. pl.
1.	prosím	prosíme	—	prosme
2.	prosíš	prosíte	pros	proste
3.	prosí	prosí	pros, prosiž	—
	participles			
past	prosil prosila prosilo		prosili prosily prosila	
pass.	prošen prošena prošeno		prošeni prošeny prošena	
	transgressives			
pres.	prose	prosíc	prosíce	
past	(vy)prosiv	(vy)prosivši	(vy)prosivše	
	infinitive	inf. stem	verbal noun	—
	prositi	pros-i-	prošení	

Sample verbs
inf.	ind. pres.	imper.	pres. tr.	part.	past tr.	noun
nositi	nosím, nosíš	nos, noste	nose	nosil, nošen	(na)nosiv	nošení
spasiti	spasím, spasíš	spas, spaste	—	spasil, spasen^{1}	spasiv	spasení^{1}
voziti	vozím, vozíš	voz, vozte	voze	vozil, vožen	(na)voziv	vožení
choditi	chodím, chodíš	choď, choďte	chodě	chodil, chosen	(na)chodiv	chození
platiti	platím, platíš	plať, plaťte	platě	platil, placen	(za)plativ	placení

^{1)} The passive participles spasen, spasena, etc. and the verbal noun spasení are in fact forms of the archaic verb spásti (see Class I-1). The corresponding forms of spasiti would be spašen and spašení (that are not in use).

=== Group 2 ===
The infinitive stem suffix is -ě- or -e- (trp-ě-l, trp-ě-ti, sáz-e-l, sáz-e-ti, um-ě-l, um-ě-ti).

==== trpí • trpěl ~ trpěti ====
pers.	ind. pres. sg.	ind. pres. pl.	imper. sg.	imper. pl.
1.	trpím	trpíme	—	trpme
2.	trpíš	trpíte	trp	trpte
3.	trpí	trpí	trp, trpiž	—
	participles			
past	trpěl trpěla trpělo		trpěli trpěly trpěla	
pass.	trpěn trpěna trpěno		trpěni trpěny trpěna	
	transgressives			
pres.	trpě	trpíc	trpíce	
past	(u)trpěv	(u)trpěvši	(u)trpěvše	
	infinitive	inf. stem	verbal noun	—
	trpěti	trp-ě-	trpění	

Common Czech uses the 3rd person plur. indicative present form trpěj besides trpí.

Sample verbs
inf.	ind. pres.	imper.	pres. tr.	part.	past tr.	noun
slyšeti	slyším, ..., slyší	slyš	slyše	slyšel, slyšen	(u)slyšev	slyšení
ležeti	ležím, ..., leží -ležejí	lež	leže -ležeje	ležel, ležen	(po)ležev	ležení

==== sází • sázel ~ sázeti ====
pers.	ind. pres. sg.	ind. pres. pl.	imper. sg.	imper. pl.
1.	sázím	sázíme	—	sázejme
2.	sázíš	sázíte	sázej	sázejte
3.	sází	sázejí	sázej, sázejž	—
	participles			
past	sázel sázela sázelo		sázeli sázely sázela	
pass.	sázen sázena sázeno		sázeni sázeny sázena	
	transgressives			
pres.	sázeje	sázejíc	sázejíce	
past	(pro)sázev	(pro)sázevši	(pro)sázevše	
	infinitive	inf. stem	verbal noun	—
	sázeti	sáz-e-	sázení	

Common Czech uses the 3rd person plur. indicative present forms sázej and sází besides sázejí.

Sample verbs
inf.	*inf.	ind. pres.	imper.	pres. tr.	part.	noun
chyběti	chyb-i-ti	chybím, ..., chybějí	chyběj	chyběje	chyběl, chyběn	chybění
vraceti	vrát-i-ti	vracím, ..., vracejí	vracej	vraceje	vracel, vracen	vracení
-cházeti	chod-i-ti	-cházím, ..., -cházejí	-cházej	-cházeje	-cházel, -cházen	-cházení
kráčeti	kroč-i-ti	kráčím, ..., kráčejí	kráčej	kráčeje	kráčel, kráčen	kráčení
-táčeti	toč-i-ti	-táčím, ..., -táčejí	-táčej	-táčeje	-táčel, -táčen	-táčení

==== umí • uměl ~ uměti ====
pers.	ind. pres. sg.	ind. pres. pl.	imper. sg.	imper. pl.
1.	umím	umíme	—	umějme
2.	umíš	umíte	uměj	umějte
3.	umí	umějí	uměj, umějž	—
	participles			
past	uměl uměla umělo		uměli uměly uměla	
pass.	(roz)uměn (roz)uměna (roz)uměno		(roz)uměni (roz)uměny (roz)uměna	
	transgressives			
pres.	uměje	umějíc	umějíce	
past	(poroz)uměv	(poroz)uměvši	(poroz)uměvše	
	infinitive	inf. stem	verbal noun	—
	uměti	um-ě-	umění	

Common Czech uses the 3rd person plur. indicative present forms uměj and umí besides umějí.

== Class V (-á-) ==
The indicative present stem suffix is -á- (děl-á-m, děl-á-š, děl-á, děl-á-me, děl-á-te) except the 3rd person plur. (děl-a-jí < ^{†}děl-a-jú < *dêl-a-jǫtъ). The infinitive stem suffix is -a- (děl-a-ti, tes-a-ti).

Class V - endings of the present forms
	sing.	plur.
ind. pres.	1. -ám 2. -áš 3. -á	1. -áme 2. -áte 3. -ají
pres. transgr.	m. -aje f. n. -ajíc	m. f. n. -ajíce
imp.	2. 3. -ej < ^{†}-aj	1. -ejme 2. -ejte

The verbs of this class are divided in two groups according to the original present stem suffix (1. *-a-je-, 2. *-je-).

=== Group 1 ===
The indicative present stem suffix -á- is a contraction of the original suffix *-a-je- (děl-á- < *dêl-a-je-). The 3rd person plural present indicative form as well as the present transgressive forms remain uncontracted (děl-a-jí < ^{†}děl-a-jú < *dêl-a-jǫtъ).

==== dělá – dělal – dělati ====
- The verbs of this type never create new forms by analogy with bráti (bere) or mazati (maže), Class I. Only the present stem forms with either the suffix -á- (contracted *-aje-) or -aj- (> -ej- in imperative) are possible.

pers.	ind. pres. sing.	ind. pres. plur.	imper. sing.	imper. plur.
1.	dělám	děláme	—	dělejme
2.	děláš	děláte	dělej	dělejte
3.	dělá	dělají	(dělejž)	—
	participles			
past	dělal dělala dělalo		dělali dělaly dělala	
pass.	dělán dělána děláno		děláni dělány dělána	
	transgressives			
pres.	dělaje	dělajíc	dělajíce	
past	(u)dělav	(u)dělavši	(u)dělavše	
	infinitive		verbal noun	
	dělati		dělání	

^{Verbs of this type}
inf.	present stem forms	infinitive stem forms
konati	konám − konej – konaje	konal – (vy)konav – konán, konání
chovati	chovám − chovej − chovaje	choval − (vy)chovav − chován, chování
doufati	doufám − doufej − doufaje	doufal − (za)doufav − doufán, doufání
ptáti (se)	ptám − ptej – ptaje	ptal – (ze)ptav – ptán, ptaní

Some other verbs:
dbáti impf. < †tbáti < *tъbati : dbám, dbej, dbaje — dbal, (nezane)dbav, dbán, dbání;
zanedbati perf. : zanedbám, zanedbej, (zanedbávaje) — zanedbal, zanedbav, zanedbán, zanedbání;
znáti impf. : znám, znej, znaje — znal, (po)znav, znán, (po-,vy-,do-,u-)znání;
poznati perf. : poznám, poznej, (poznávaje) — poznal, poznav, poznán, poznání;
poznávati impf. : poznávám, poznávej, poznávaje — poznával, (poznav), poznáván, poznávání
nechati perf. : nechám, nechej (nech), (nechávaje) — nechal, nechav, nechán, nechání;
nechávati impf. : nechávám, nechávej, nechávaje — nechával, (nechav), necháván, nechávání;
obědvati denom. < *obêdъ : obědvám, obědvej, obědvaje — obědval, (po)obědvav, obědván, obědvání;
hráti < †jhráti < *jьgrati : obs. ind. hrám, hráš … hrají (replaced by hraji, hraješ …, see láti, Class III), hrej, hraje — obs. part. hral, hrali (replaced by hrál, hráli, see láti, Class III), (se)hrav, hrán, hraní;
-dolati perf. (o-,z-,u-) : -dolám, -dolej, (-dolávaje) — -dolal, -dolav, -dolán, -dolání;
plácati (drncati, kecati, cucati, etc.) : plácám, plácej, plácaje — plácal, (u)plácav, plácán, plácání;

=== Group 2 ===
The original present stem suffix was *-je-, added directly to the consonantal primary stem (teš-e- < *tes-je-) and not *-a-je-. The new present stem suffix -á- in tes-á- is an analogy to děl-á- (see dělati in Group 1). The verbs of this group have two sets of the present stem forms (original teše and new tesá).

==== tesá ∥ teše – tesal – tesati ====
- The primary stem ends in s or z (tes-, řez-).

pers.	ind. pres. sing.	ind. pres. plur.	imper. sing.	imper. plur.
1.	tesám ∥ teši, tešu	tesáme ∥ tešeme	—	tesejme ∥ tešme
2.	tesáš ∥ tešeš	tesáte ∥ tešete	tesej ∥ teš	tesejte ∥ tešte
3.	tesá ∥ teše	tesají ∥ teší, tešou	(tešiž)	—
	participles			
past	tesal tesala tesalo		tesali tesaly tesala	
pass.	tesán tesána tesáno		tesáni tesány tesána	
	transgressives			
pres.	tesaje ∥ teše	tesajíc ∥ tešíc	tesajíce ∥ tešíce	
past	(vy)tesav	(vy)tesavši	(vy)tesavše	
	infinitive		verbal noun	
	tesati		tesání	

• In the case of common verbs both the new present stem forms (tesá, tesej, etc.) and the original forms (teše, teš, etc.) are commonly in use (e.g. „češe si vlasy – česá ovoce“, „nakluše do práce – kůň klusá“, etc.).
• In the case of less common verbs the original present stem forms are mostly bookish or dialectal (e.g. „hlad tě opáše“, „břečka kyšíc proměňuje sloučenství“, „vykaše si rukávy“, etc.).
• The present indicative forms teši and teší (with endings -i < -u and -í < -ú) are bookish.
• The present transgressive forms are generally bookish, the forms teše, tešíc even more than tesaje, tesajíc.
• The infinitive stem forms are regular, formed according to děl-a-ti, maz-a-ti.

^{Verbs of this type (present stem forms)}
inf.	new forms → dělá	original forms → maže
česati	česám – česej – česaje	češi, češu, češeš … češí, češou – češ, češte – češe, češíc
klusati	klusám – klusej – klusaje	kluši, klušu, klušeš … kluší, klušou – kluš, klušte – kluše, klušíc
křesati	křesám – křesej – křesaje	křeši, křešu, křešeš … křeší, křešou – křeš, křešte – křeše, křešíc
řezati	řezám – řezej – řezaje	řeži, řežu, řežeš … řeží, řežou – řež, řežte – řeže, řežíc
lízati	lízám – lízej – lízaje	líži, lížu, lížeš … líží, lížou – liž, ližte – líže, lížíc
hryzati	hryzám – hryzej – hryzaje	hryži, hryžu, hryžeš … hryží, hryžou – hryž, hryžte – hryže, hryžíc

Some other verbs:
hlásati : hlásá, hláše; — plesati : plesá, pleše; — kysati : kysá, kyše; — pásati (se) : pásá, páše (páchá, páše is a different verb) — kasati : kasá, kaše — kolísati : kolísá, kolíše; — knísati (se) : knísá, kníše; — klouzati : klouzá, klouže.

==== hýbá ∥ hýbe – hýbal – hýbati ====
- The primary stem ends in b, p, v, f or m (hýb-, klep-, plav-, klof-, dřím-).

pers.	ind. pres. sing.	ind. pres. plur.	imper. sing.	imper. plur.
1.	hýbám ∥ hýbu hýbi	hýbáme ∥ hýbeme	—	hýbejme hybme
2.	hýbáš ∥ hýbeš	hýbáte ∥ hýbete	hýbej hyb	hýbejte hybte
3.	hýbá ∥ hýbe	hýbají ∥ hýbou hýbí	(hybiž)	—
	participles			
past	hýbal hýbala hýbalo		hýbali hýbaly hýbala	
pass.	hýbán hýbána hýbáno		hýbáni hýbány hýbána	
	transgressives			
pres.	hýbaje hýbě	hýbajíc hýbíc	hýbajíce hýbíce	
past	(za)hýbav	(za)hýbavši	(za)hýbavše	
	infinitive		verbal noun	
	hýbati		hýbání	

• The new present indicative forms (hýbá, etc.) and the original forms (hýbe, etc.) are equally frequent.
• The original present indicative forms hýbi and hýbí (with endings -i < -u and -í < -ú) are obsolete.
• The original present transgressive forms (hýbě, hýbíc, etc.) are obsolete.
• The original imperative forms (hyb, hybte, etc.) are obsolete with some exceptions (e.g. syp, plav).
• The infinitive stem forms are regular, formed according to děl-a-ti, maz-a-ti.

^{Verbs of this type (present stem forms)}
inf.	new forms → dělá	original forms → maže
dlabati	dlabám – dlabej – dlabaje	dlabu, dlabeš, dlabe … dlabou – dlab, dlabte
klepati	klepám – klepej – klepaje	klepu, klepeš, klepe … klepou – klep, klepte
kopati	kopám – kopej – kopaje	kopu, kopeš, kope … kopou
koupati	koupám – koupejte – koupaje	koupu, koupeš, koupe … koupou
sypati	sypám – sypej – sypaje	sypu, sypeš, sype … sypou – syp, sypte

Some other verbs:
škrabati (or škrábati) : škrabá, škrabe; – drápati : drápá, drápe; – chrápati : chrápá, chrápe; – dupati : dupá, dupe; – loupati : loupá, loupe; – rýpati : rýpá, rýpe; – štípati : štípá, štípe; – šlapati : šlapá, šlape; – chápati : chápá, chápe; – sápati : sápá, sápe; – skřípati : skřípá, skřípe; – šlapati : šlapá, šlape; – tápati : tápá, tápe; – dřímati : dřímá, dříme; – klamati : klamá, klame; – lámati : lámá, láme; – plavati : plavá, plave.

==== orá ∥ oře – oral – orati ====
- The primary stem ends in r, l or n (or-, chrchl- ston-).

pers.	ind. pres. sing.	ind. pres. plur.	imper. sing.	imper. plur.
1.	orám ∥ oři, ořu	oráme ∥ ořeme	—	orejme ∥ ořme
2.	oráš ∥ ořeš	oráte ∥ ořete	orej ∥ oř	orejte ∥ ořte
3.	orá ∥ oře	orají ∥ oří, ořou	oř, ořiž	—
	participles			
past	oral orala oralo		orali oraly orala	
pass.	orán orána oráno		oráni orány orána	
	transgressives			
pres.	oraje ∥ oře	orajíc ∥ oříc	orajíce ∥ oříce	
past	(do)orav	(do)oravši	(do)oravše	
	infinitive		verbal noun	
	orati		orání	

• The original present stem forms are generally less frequent, in some cases they are archaic or dialectal („nemajíce sobě zač chleba kúpiti, chodili po domích žebříce“, „proč se v tom šťářeš?“).
• The present indicative forms oři and oří (with endings -i < -u and -í < -ú) are bookish („polí svých oří“).
• The infinitive stem forms are regular, formed according to děl-a-ti, maz-a-ti.

^{Some verbs of this type (present stem forms)}
inf.	new forms → dělá	original forms → maže
kárati	kárám – kárej – káraje	káři, kářu, kářeš … káří, kářou – káře, káříc
párati	párám – párej – páraje	páři, pářu, pářeš … páří, pářou – páře, páříc
skuhrati	skuhrám – skuhrej – skuhraje	arch. skuhři, skuhřu, skuhřeš … skuhří, skuhřou – skuhře, skuhříc
žebrati	žebrám – žebrej – žebraje	arch. žebři, žebřu, žebřeš … žebří, žebřou – žebře, žebříc
žehrati	žehrám – žehrej – žehraje	arch. žehři, žehřu, žehřeš … žehří, žehřou – žehře, žehříc
chrchlati	chrchlám – chrchlej – chrchlaje	chrchli, chrchlu, chrchleš … chrchlí, chrchlou – chrchle, chrchlíc
stonati	stonám – stonej – stonaje	stůni, stůňu < ^{†}stóňu , stůněš … stůní, stůňou – stůně, stůníc

Some other verbs:
škemrati : škemrá, škemře; – krákorati : krákorá, krákoře; – čabrati : čabrá, čabře; – šťárati : šťárá, šťáře; – babrati : babrá, babře; – (s)bírati : (s)bírá, (s)bíře; – (u)mírati : (u)mírá, (u)míře impf. (umře is perf.); – (za)vírati : (za)vírá, (za)víře impf. (zavře is perf.); – plápolati : plápolá, plápole; – bublati : bublá, buble; – huhlati : huhlá, huhle; – dudlati : dudlá, dudle; – brblati : brblá, brble; – frflati : frflá, frfle.

Examples of using original forms:
„ktož uoře (< óře) chtě bohat býti“ — „ten [kůň] vždy vůře“ — „zemí našich nevořeme“ — „jimi [voly] rolí oříce [Egypťané]“ — „ti, kdo pod rouškou horlivosti jiné káří“ — „co žehřeš proti snoubenci svému?“ — „žehří naň všickni“ — „Priamus proti Eneášovi žehře (= žehraje) takto vece“ — „písně svoje skuhřeme“ — „skuhřete, že zle zní naše řeč“ — „pyšný žebrák nic nevyžebře“ — „v zimě žebřú“ — „máš křídla, že krákořeš?“ — „kuře krákoře“ — „ženy jako slepice krákoří“ — „co se s tím babřeš?“ — „škemře o pochopení“ — „šťáře se v uchu“ — „koně kašlou, chrchlí“ — „ve škole všichni chrchlou“.

==== pyká ∥ pyče – pykal – pykati ====
- The primary stem ends in k, h or ch (pyk-, strouh-, dých-).

pers.	ind. pres. sing.	ind. pres. plur.	imper. sing.	imper. plur.
1.	pykám pyči	pykáme pyčeme	—	pykejme pyčme
2.	pykáš pyčeš	pykáte pyčete	pykej pyč	pykejte pyčte
3.	pyká pyče	pykají pyčí	pyč, pyčiž	—
	participles			
past	pykal pykala pykalo		pykali pykaly pykala	
pass.	pykán pykána pykáno		pykáni pykány pykána	
	transgressives			
pres.	pykaje pyče	pykajíc pyčíc	pykajíce pyčíce	
past	(od)pykav	(od)pykavši	(od)pykavše	
	infinitive		verbal noun	
	pykati		pykání	

• The original present stem forms are generally less frequent, in most cases they are bookish or dialectal (e.g. „stýště se duši mé v životě mém“, „nešlechetník nešlechetnost páše“, „matka hrůzou sotva dýše“, „zajíc v lese, a on rožeň strouže“ — „co se mne týče“ = as far as I am concerned (fixed expression) — „když jde pomalu, tak kulže“, „co to říčete?“, „malá furt fňuče“).
• In the case of the verb pykati the original present stem forms are very archaic (e.g. „jeho [Husovy] smrti velmi pyčí = litují“, „pyčtež mne panny a šlechetné panie = litujtež“, „minulých věcí nepyč = nelituj“).
• The infinitive stem forms are regular, formed according to děl-a-ti, maz-a-ti.

^{Some verbs of this type (present stem forms)}
inf.	new forms → dělá	original forms → maže
týkati (se)	týkám – týkej – týkaje	týči, týčeš, týče … týčí – týče, týčíc
stýskati	stýskám – stýskej – stýskaje	stýšti < ^{†}stýšču, stýštěš, stýště … stýští – stýště, stýštíc < ^{†}stýščúc
strouhati	strouhám – strouhej – strouhaje	strouži, stroužeš, strouže … strouží – strouže, stroužíc
dýchati	dýchám – dýchej – dýchaje	dýši, dýšeš, dýše … dýší – dýše, dýšíc

Some other verbs:
blýskati (se) : blýská, blýště (*-sk-je- > -ště-); — lákati : láká, láče; — kdákati : kdáká, kdáče; — krákati : kráká, kráče; — kvákati : kváká, kváče; — říkati : říká, říče; — smýkati : smýká, smýče; — stříkati : stříká, stříče; — soukati < súkati : souká, souče (dial. súče); — tleskati : tleská, tleště; — výskati : výská, výště; — získati perf. < †jískati < *jьskati (= hledati) : získá, zíště (†jíště = hledá); — kulhati : kulhá, kulže; — páchati : páchá, páše (pásá, páše is a different verb); — dial. brkati : brká, brče; — fňukati : fňuká, fňuče.

==== trestá ∥ tresce – trestal – trestati ====
- The primary stem ends in t or d (trest-, hlod-).

pers.	ind. pres. sing.	ind. pres. plur.	imper. sing.	imper. plur.
1.	trestám tresci	trestáme tresceme	—	trestejme tresceme
2.	trestáš tresceš	trestáte trescete	trestej tresci	trestejte trescete
3.	trestá tresce	trestají trescí	tresci, tresciž	—
	participles			
past	trestal trestala trestalo		trestali trestaly trestala	
pass.	trestán trestána trestáno		trestáni trestány trestána	
	transgressives			
pres.	trestaje tresce	trestajíc trescíc	trestajíce trescíce	
past	(po)trestav	(po)trestavši	(po)trestavše	
	infinitive		verbal noun	
	trestati < ^{†}tresktati < *trъskъtati		trestání	

• The original present stem forms are either archaic or dialectal (e.g. „padělání se tresce dle zákona“, „vězeň svou pověst šepce dál“, „žabí havěď v potoce pohřební píseň skřehoce“, „komoňové lační boje řehcí“ — „co tady léceš?“, „do úla jim lécou aj vosy“, „husy gagocú“).
• After losing iotation the imperative forms tresceme, trescete < ^{†}treskcěme, treskcěte and the present transgressive form tresce < ^{†}treskcě became homophonous with some indicative forms. Transition to the new forms has solved the problem.
• The infinitive stem forms are regular, formed according to děl-a-ti, maz-a-ti.

^{Some verbs of this type (present stem forms)}
inf.	new forms → dělá	original forms → maže
reptati	reptám – reptej – reptaje	repci, repceš, repce … repcí – repci, repcete < ^{†}repcěte – repce < ^{†}repcě, repcíc
řehtati	řehtám – řehtej – řehtaje	řehci, řehceš, řehce … řehcí – řehci, řehcete – řehce, řehcíc
šeptati	šeptám – šeptej – šeptaje	šepci, šepceš, šepce … šepcí – šepci, šepcete – šepce, šepcíc
metati	metám – metej – metaje	meci, meceš, mece … mecí – mec, mecte – mece, mecíc
hlodati	hlodám – hlodej – hlodaje	hlozi, hlozeš, hloze … hlozí – hloz, hlozte – hloze, hlozíc

Some other verbs:
blekotati : blekotá, blekoce; — breptati : breptá, brepce; — drkotati : drkotá, drkoce; — hrkotati : hrkotá, hrkoce; — chechtati (se) : chechtá, chechce; — chlemtati : chlemtá, chlemce; — chrochtati : chrochtá, chrochce; — chytati : chytá, chyce (only dial.); — jektati : jektá, jekce; — klevetati : klevetá, klevece; — kloktati : kloktá, klokce; — klokotati : klokotá, klokoce; — klopotati : klopotá, klopoce; — kutati : kutá, kuce (only dial.); — lechtati : lechtá, lechce; — leptati : leptá, lepce; — létati : létá, léce; — lopotati : lopotá, lopoce; — mihotati : mihotá, mihoce; — řehotati : řehotá, řehoce; — skřehotati : skřehotá, skřehoce; — soptati : soptá, sopce; — štěbetati < †ščebetati : štěbetá, štěbece; — troskotati (se) : troskotá, troskoce; — třepotati : třepotá, třepoce; — hvízdati : hvízdá, hvíždě (*-zd-je- > -ždě-).

== Athematic (irregular) verbs ==
The verbs with an athematic present stem (být, dáti, jísti, věděti) and míti.

=== býti, jsem ===
pers.	pres. sg.	pres. pl.	fut. sg.	fut. pl.	imper. sg.	imper. pl.
1.	jsem	jsme	budu	budeme	—	buďme
2.	jsi	jste	budeš	budete	buď	buďte
3.	je, jest	jsou	bude	budou	buď, budiž	—
	participles					
past	byl byla bylo			byli byly byla		
pass.	byt byta byto			byti byty byta		
	transgressives					
pres.	jsa	jsouc		jsouce		
past	byv	byvši		byvše		
	infinitive	inf. stem	verbal noun		—	
	býti	by-	bytí			

=== dáti, dám ===
pers.	ind. pres. sg.	ind. pres. pl.	imper. sg.	imper. pl.
1.	dám	dáme	—	dejme
2.	dáš	dáte	dej	dejte
3.	dá	dají dadí	dej, dejž	—
	participles			
past	dal dala dalo		dali daly dala	
pass.	dán dána dáno		dáni dány dána	
	transgressives			
pres.	daje dada	dajíc dadouc	dajíce dadouce	
past	(vy)dav	(vy)davši	(vy)davše	
	infinitive	inf. stem	verbal noun	—
	dáti	da-	dání	

=== jísti, jím ===
pers.	ind. pres. sg.	ind. pres. pl.	imper. sg.	imper. pl.
1.	jím	jíme	—	jezme
2.	jíš	jíte	jez	jezte
3.	jí	jedí	jez, jeziž	—
	participles			
past	jedl jedla jedlo		jedli jedly jedla	
pass.	jeden jedena jedeno		jedeni jedeny jedena	
	transgressives			
pres.	jeda	jedouc	jedouce	
past	(do)jed	(do)jedši	(do)jedše	
	infinitive	inf. stem	verbal noun	—
	jísti	jed-	jedení	

=== věděti, vím ===
pers.	ind. pres. sg.	ind. pres. pl.	imper. sg.	imper. pl.
1.	vím	víme	—	vězme
2.	víš	víte	věz	vězte
3.	ví	vědí	věz, věziž	—
	participles			
past	věděl věděla vědělo		věděli věděly věděla	
pass.	věděn věděna věděno		věděni věděny věděna	
	transgressives			
pres.	věda	vědouc	vědouce	
past	(z)věděv	(z)věděvši	(z)věděvše	
	infinitive	inf. stem	verbal noun	—
	věděti	vědě-	vědění	

=== míti, mám ===
pers.	ind. pres. sg.	ind. pres. pl.	imper. sg.	imper. pl.
1.	mám	máme	—	mějme
2.	máš	máte	měj	mějte
3.	má	mají	měj, mějž	—
	participles			
past	měl měla mělo		měli měly měla	
pass.	(jměn, jmín < jmien)			
	transgressives			
pres.	maje	majíc	majíce	
past	(po)měv (se)	(po)měvši (se)	(po)měvše (se)	
	infinitive	inf. stem	verbal noun	—
	míti < jmieti	(j)mě-	jmění	

The passive participles jměn, jmín, etc. are archaic ("blázen, mlče, za moudrého jmín bývá").

== Comments, explanatory notes ==
=== Root vowel mutation (přísti) ===
The verb přísti demonstrates a regular root vowel mutation (umlaut) in the roots in which the original Protoslavic root vowel was -ę- (nasal ẽ):

- přísti < OCz přiesti (přadu, přědeš, přěde, ..., přadú) < *prʲad- < *pręd-
- másti < OCz miesti (matu, měteš, měte, ..., matú) < *mʲat- < *męt-
- třásti < OCz třiesti (třasu, třěseš, třěse, ..., třasú) < *trʲas- < *tręs-
- zábsti < OCz ziebsti (zabu, zěbeš, zěbe, ..., zabú) < *zʲab- < *zęb-

pers.	ind. pres. sing.	ind. pres. plur.	imper. sing.	imper. plur.
1.	přadu	předeme	—	přeďme
2.	předeš	předete	přeď	přeďte
3.	přede	přadou	přeď (přediž)	—
	participles			
past	přadl přadla přadlo		předli (sic!) přadly přadla	
pass.	předen předena předeno		předeni předeny předena	
	transgressives			
pres.	přada	přadouc	přadouce	
past	(u)přad	(u)předši	(u)předše	
	infinitive		verbal noun	
	přísti		předení	
N.B.	This is not a conjugation type: přísti and másti are conjugated like vésti (vede), and třásti like nésti (nese).			

However the regular pattern shown in the table has been eventually corrupted. New umlauted forms have been created by analogy, albeit there was no reason for umlaut (e.g. předu, předl, etc.). Nowadays both original and new forms are in use, with different, regionally dependent frequency. The following table shows the forms that are preferred by majority of the Czech speakers:

Contemporary forms
inf.	ind. pres.	imper.	pres. tr.	part.	past tr.	noun
přísti^{1)}	předu, předeš	přeď, přeďte	předa	předl, předen	(u)před	předení
másti^{2)}	matu, mateš	mať, maťte	mata	mátl, maten	(z)mát	matení
třásti	třesu, třeseš	třes, třeste	třesa	třásl, třesen	(za)třás	třesení
zábsti^{3)}	zebu, zebeš	zeb, zebte	zeba	zábl, (zeben)	(za)záb	zebení

^{1)} all forms in common use are umlauted; non-umlauted forms are used only sporadically („přadlena každý den přadla“)
^{2)} no umlauted forms are used nowadays; the umlauted verbal noun změtení is bookish („babylonské změtení jazyků“)
^{3)} the umlauted infinitive zíbst is regional as well as the non-umlauted form zabou („zabou mě nohy“)

== Bibliography ==
- Gebauer, Jan (1898). Historická mluvnice jazyka českého (díl III. Tvarosloví, část II. Časování). Praha: F. Tempský.
- Gebauer, Jan; Trávníček, František (1930). Příruční mluvnice jazyka českého pro učitele a studium soukromé. Praha: Česká grafická unie.
- Trávníček, František (1952). Slovník jazyka českého. Praha: Slovanské nakladatelství.
- Adam, Karel; Jaroš, Václav; Holub, Josef (1953). Český slovník pravopisný a tvaroslovný. Praha: SPN.
