= Štefan Žáry =

- Born: 12 December 1918; Poniky, Austria-Hungary
- Died: 25 August 2007 (aged 88); Bratislava, Slovakia
- Education: Comenius University
- Occupations: Poet; Essayist; Translator
- Writing career
- Language: Slovak

Štefan Žáry (12 December 1918 in Poniky – 25 August 2007 in Bratislava) was a Slovak poet, prosaist, translator and essayist; author of erotic lyric poetry, patriotic and anti-war poems, reminiscential prose. In his patriotic poems, he expressed his disappointment of a civilization progress. He translated mainly French literature.

His works were initially related with surrealism, later he referred to folk and classical traditions. Notable works include collection of poems Srdcia na mozaike (1938), Meč a vavrin (1948), Smaragdové rúno (1977), Malá letná suita v štyroch vetách (1995), parodies of Slovak folk songs Satironikon (1990), novel Ktorýsi deň z konca leta (1998).
