= Eva Kováčová =

Slovak poet (1951–2010)

Eva Kováčová (née Eva Šelmecová, 14 July 1951 in Rimavská Sobota – 12 February 2010 in Bratislava) was a Slovak poet.

Kováčová graduated in Pedagogy from Matej Bel University in 1978. Until 1980 she worked for the publisher Slovenský spisovateľ, later for the Pravda daily.

She published her first poems in the Nové Slovo newspaper. In 1973 she published a book of poems about love Striedavo oblačno (Partly cloudy), followed by Zastavenie v čase (A stop in time, 1978), Vážne vášne (Serius passions, 1982) and Labutia Pieseň (Swan song, 1996). She contributed poetry to Rimavskou dolinou (Through the Rimava valley), a photobook about her home region. In 2005 she published an autobiography Príbehy Evy Šelmecovej (Stories of Eva Šelmecová).
