= Poniky =

Poniky Pónik
- Municipality
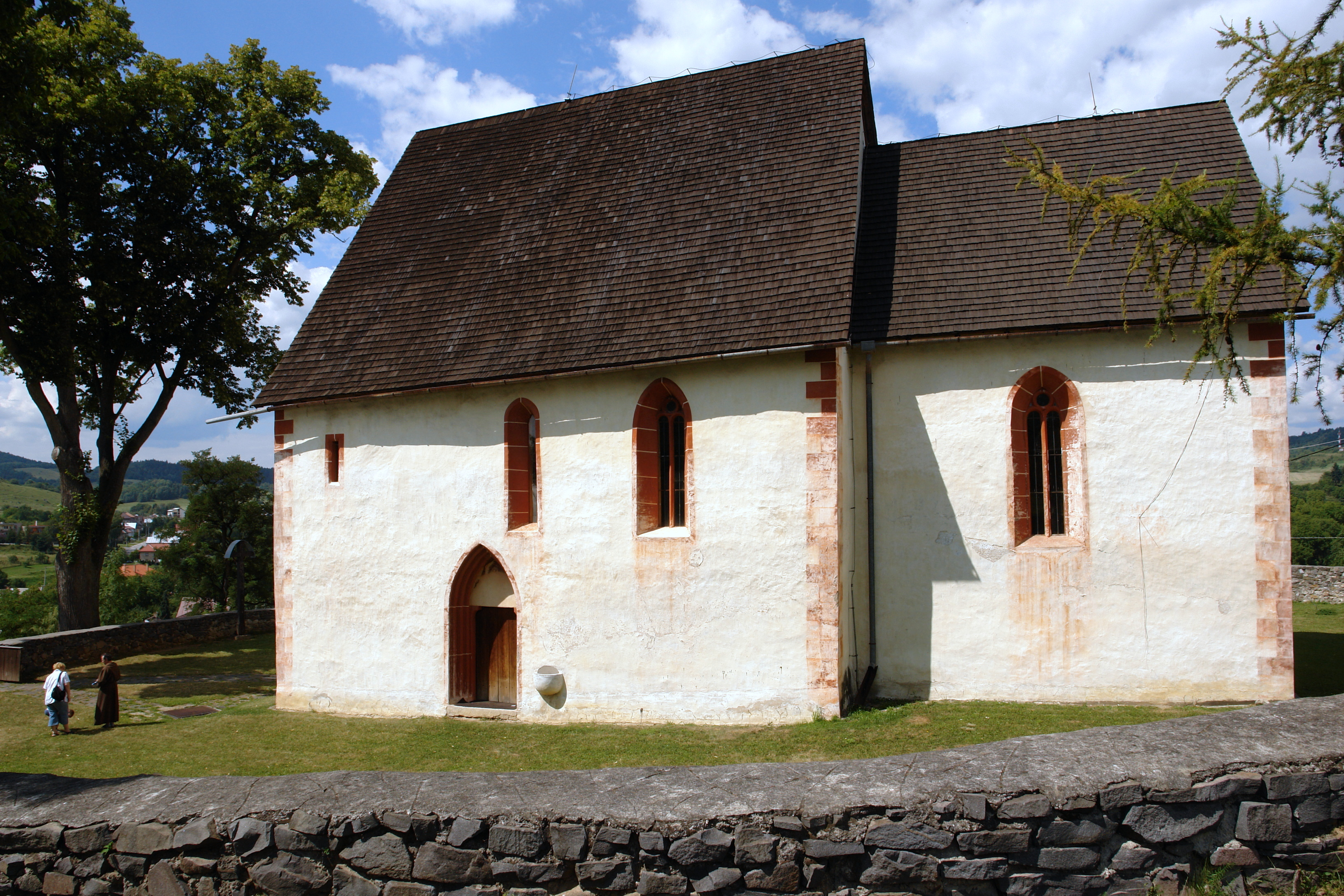
- Church of Saint Francis of Assisi

- Flag

- Location of Poniky in the Banská Bystrica Region Location of Poniky in Slovakia
- Coordinates: 48.72°N 19.28°E
- Country: Slovakia
- Region: Banská Bystrica Region
- District: Banská Bystrica District
- First mentioned: 1282

Area
  - Total: 59.03 km^{2} (22.79 sq mi)
- Elevation: 499 m (1,637 ft)

Population (2025)
  - Total: 1,544
- Time zone: UTC+1 (CET)
  - Summer (DST): UTC+2 (CEST)
- Postal code: 976 33
- Area code: +421 48
- Vehicle registration plate (until 2022): BB
- Website: www.poniky.sk

Poniky (Hungarian: Pónik) is a village and municipality in Banská Bystrica District in the Banská Bystrica Region of central Slovakia.

== History ==
In historical records the village was first mentioned in 1282. Before the establishment of independent Czechoslovakia in 1918, Poniky was part of Zólyom County within the Kingdom of Hungary. From 1939 to 1945, it was part of the Slovak Republic. On 23 March 1945, the Romanian Army dislodged the Wehrmacht from Poniky and it was once again part of Czechoslovakia.

== Geography ==
The municipality lies at an altitude of 499 metres (1,637 ft) and covers an area of 59.03 km^{2} (22.79 sq mi) (2025).

== Population ==
Population statistic (10 years)
Year	1995	2005	2015	2025
Count	1551	1569	1569	1544
Difference		+1.16%	+0%	−1.59%

Population statistic
Year	2024	2025
Count	1554	1544
Difference		−0.64%

It has a population of 1544 people (31 December 2025).

=== Ethnicity ===
Census 2021 (1+ %)
Ethnicity	Number	Fraction
Slovak	1501	98.16%
Romani	37	2.41%
Not found out	19	1.24%
Total	1529	

In year 2021 was 1529 people by ethnicity 1501 as Slovak, 37 as Romani, 19 as Not found out, 9 as Czech, 6 as Other, 2 as Ukrainian, 2 as Russian, 2 as Hungarian, 1 as Irish, 1 as Italian, 1 as Rusyn, 1 as German, 1 as Moravian, 1 as Croatian and 1 as Albanian.

Note on population: The difference values of population numbers in the table "Population statistic" and in the sections "Ethnicity" & "Religion" is caused by the use of various statistical methods.

=== Religion ===
Census 2021 (1+ %)
Religion	Number	Fraction
Evangelical Church	632	41.33%
Roman Catholic Church	467	30.54%
None	371	24.26%
Not found out	18	1.18%
Greek Catholic Church	18	1.18%
Total	1529	

In year 2021 was 1529 people by religion 632 from Evangelical Church, 467 from Roman Catholic Church, 371 from None, 18 from Not found out, 18 from Greek Catholic Church, 9 from Christian Congregations in Slovakia, 6 from Eastern Orthodox Church, 4 from Ad hoc movements, 2 from Other and not ascertained christian church and 2 from Other.
