= Katarína Lazarová =

Slovak writer and translator

- Born: 13 February 1914; Výčapy-Opatovce
- Died: 21 June 1995 (aged 81); Bratislava
- Occupations: writer, translator

Katarína Lazarová (13 February 1914 – 21 June 1995) was a Slovak writer and translator.

== Early life and education ==
Katarína Lazarová was born on 13 February 1914 in Výčapy-Opatovce. She attended a grammar school at Nové Mesto nad Váhom (1924–1928), then continued her education in Nitra (1928–1930). In the years 1930–1932, she completed an internship at a large farm in Janova Ves, then took on occasional work. In the years 1937–1938 she worked in Žilina as a clerk at the editorial office of the magazine Slovenský hlas.

== Career ==
During World War II, Katarína Lazarová worked as a civil servant in Bratislava and took part in the local resistance. In the years 1944–1945, she served in the 1st Czechoslovak Partisan Brigade and participated in the Slovak National Uprising. After 1945, she worked for Zväz protifašistických bojovníkov (Union of Anti-Fascist Fighters), Zväz slovenských žien (Union of Slovak Women), Zväz slovenských spisovateľov (Union of Slovak Writers) and other organisations.

After the war, Lazarová became an established novelist, writing often about the Slovak National Uprising or social matters. She received a state award for her literary work. In the 60s, she started writing detective books which gained much popularity. She also wrote one book for children. Her novels have been translated into Bulgarian, Czech, Hungarian and Ukrainian. Apart from writing her own work, Lazarová also contributed as a literary translator from German and Spanish into Slovak.

Initially, Lazarová was in good standing with the ruling Communist Party of Czechoslovakia (KSČ) and was registered at ŠtB. In 1956, she spoke at the second Congress of Czechoslovak Writers, where she condemned political repression and press surveillance, which was the first instance of censorship being mentioned in the official media and thus brought officially to the wider public. Afterwards, in the second half of the 1950s, Lazarová faced some issues with publishing her books and articles. When the amnesty was declared on 9 May 1960, the former KSČ officials and the ŠtB met at Lazarová's apartment. After the Warsaw Pact invasion of Czechoslovakia, she took part in a debate in Vienna on future political developments in her country, led by Emil Vidra, a former chairman of a human rights protection organisation. In 1974, she was reclassified as a person hostile to the government by the ŠtB.

She died on 21 June 1995 in Bratislava.

== Works ==
- Kamaráti, 1949
- Traja z neba, 1950
- Osie hniezdo,1953
- Omyly, 1957
- Mločia hora, 1961
- Šarkan na reťazi, 1962
- Kňažná z Lemúrie, 1964
- Trpaslíci, 1966
- Interview s labuťami, 1966
- Kavčie pierko, 1967
- Putovanie svätej Anny, 1968
- Vlkolaci, 1970
- Štyri detekíivky, 1976 – anthology of four previously published detective novels
- Povesť o snežnom človeku, 1966 – book for children
- Vdovské domy, 1977
