= Martin Orgoník-Kunovský =

Slovak poet and writer

Martin Orgoník Kunovský
- Born: 28 May 1887; Senica, Austria-Hungary (now Senica, Slovakia)
- Died: 17 March 1916 (aged 28)
- Occupations: Poet, writer

Martin Orgoník Kunovský (28 May 1887 – 17 March 1916) was a Slovak poet and writer born in Senica. He was known mainly for "combining text and melody".

== Early life ==
He was born in the town Senica in the quarter Kunov. Martin had 6 siblings – Pavol, Ján, Štefan, Anna, Katarína, Kristína.

He started to be interested in books mainly thanks to his father.

Orgoník-Kunovský fought in World War I in the Austro-Hungarian Army, first on the Serbian Front, then on the Italian Front.

== Death ==
Orgoník-Kunovský committed suicide in March 1916. He shot himself.
