= Jana Kantorová-Báliková =

Slovak poet

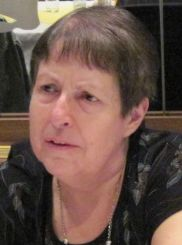
- Born: 9 June 1951 (age 75); Bratislava

Jana Kantorová-Báliková is a Slovak poet and one of the leading translators of poetry from English. Born in 1951 in Bratislava, she graduated from Komenský University in Bratislava in pedagogical psychology and English. Between 1974 and 1977, she worked as literary editor for various journals and, from 1977 to 1990, as a poetry editor for Slovenský spisovateľ [Slovak Writer] publishers. Since then she has been a freelance translator. She has published five volumes of her own poetry, including the 2005 selection Pondelok v galérii [Monday in a Gallery]. She has translated a lot of poems or part of poems into the prosaic works translated by other translators, and also published her own prosaic translations, but the most important of her works are her translations of poetry.

She has translated more than twenty poets from English. The foremost of her translated books are: Elizabeth Barrett Browning, Sonnets from the Portuguese, 1978; Edgar Allan Poe, The Raven and Other Poems, 1979; Oscar Wilde, The Ballad of Reading Gaol, 1981; The Lake Poets, a selection of poems by Wordsworth, Coleridge and Southey, 1989; as well as editions of Selected Poems by William Blake, 1976; Robert Browning, 1977; Brendan Kennelly, 1984 and 2003; Percy Bysshe Shelley, 1995; Robert Burns, 1999; Seamus Heaney, 2000; Douglas Dunn, 2009; Rudyard Kipling, 2011; John Deane, 2012; W.B. Yeats, 2012; Gilbert Keith Chesterton, 2013; Alfred Tennyson, 2014; John Donne, 2017; Louise Glück, 2017; John Clare, 2018 and Jim Harrison, 2020. She has been awarded the Slovak Literary Fund’s Cena Jána Hollého [Ján Hollý Prize] on five occasions, in 1981(Oscar Wilde); 1999 (Robert Burns); 2010 Vladimir Nabokov (Poem in a novel Pale Fire); 2014 Alfred Tennyson and 2017 John Donne.
