= Martin Rázus =

Slovak poet, politician, dramatist, writer and priest (1888–1937)

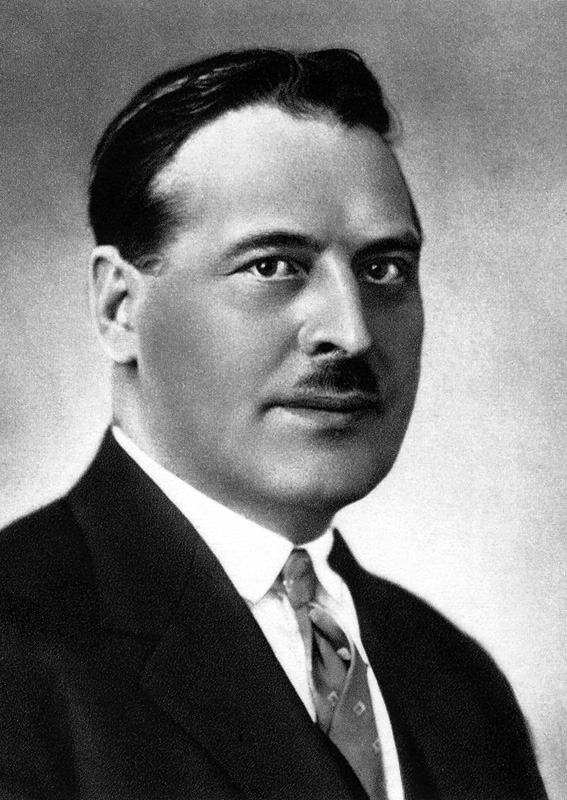
- Born: Martin Rázus; 18 October 1888; Liptószentmiklós, Austria-Hungary (now Liptovský Mikuláš, Slovakia)
- Died: 8 August 1937 (aged 48); Brezno, Czechoslovakia
- Occupation: Author

Martin Rázus (pseudonym: Mrazák; 18 October 1888 – 8 August 1937) was a Slovak poet, dramatist, writer, politician, and Lutheran priest

== Sources ==
- Michal Gáfrik: Martin Rázus I., Národné literárne centrum 1998, ISBN 80-88878-24-1.
- Michal Gáfrik: Martin Rázus II., Národné literárne centrum 2000, ISBN 80-88878-65-9.
