= Vavrinec Benedikt of Nedožery =

Slovak-Czech mathematician, poet, translator and philologist

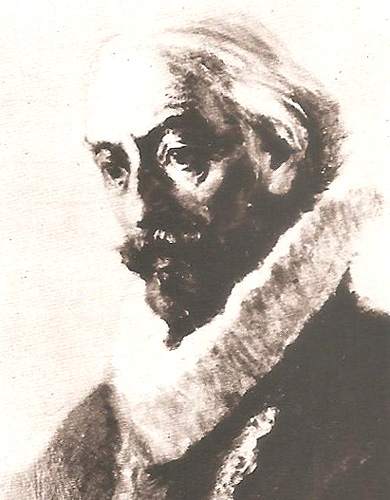
Vavrinec Benedikt of Nedožery

Vavrinec Benedikt of Nedožery (Slovak: Vavrinec Benedikt z Nedožier, Czech: Vavřinec Benedikt z Nudožer (Nedožer) or Nudožerinus, Hungarian: Benedicti M. Lőrinc, Latin: Laurentius Benedictus Nudozierinus; 10 August 1555 – 4 June 1615) was a Slovak mathematician, teacher, poet, translator and philologist. He worked in Bohemia.

== Biography ==
Vavrinec Benedikt of Nedožery was born on 10 August 1555 in Nedožery. He studied in Jihlava and Prague. From 1604, he was active at the University of Prague, where he taught classical philology and later mathematics. He was the dean and vice-rector of the university. He was involved in the development of Czech humanism.

He was the author of the first systematic Czech grammar (Grammaticae Bohemicae ad leges naturalis methodi conformatae, et notis numerisque illustratae ac distinctae, libri duo, 1603). He also drew attention to Slovak as a distinct language and urged Slovaks to cultivate their language decades before national linguistic revival.

He died on 4 June 1615 in Prague.

== See also ==
- List of Czech writers
- List of Slovak poets
