= Jozef Ján Matejka =

Slovak doctor and writer (born 1949)

Jozef Ján Matejka (born 10 March 1949 Trenčin, Czechoslovakia) is a Slovak doctor and writer.

He started taking an interest in poetry during his college studies, however he became serious about writing his own work during the year 2000, when he moved with his family to Malta, where he wrote and later published his first book, Príležitostné Básne, a collection of his poems. Matejka has authored six books. During the course of writing and publishing his books, Matejka worked with two Slovak painters and a photographer, who had helped him with the illustrations for his books.

== Bibliography ==
- Príležitostné Básne. Slovakia: Limerick. 2007. ISBN 978-80-969427-5-6.
- Budulienko Story. Slovakia: Limerick. 2009. EAN 978-80-969427-8-9.
- Básni a obrazu, podľahnúť odrazu. Slovakia: Limerick. 2010. EAN 978-80-970158-0-2.
- Hviezdy nad Carcassonne. Limerick. 2012. EAN 978-80-970159-0-3.
- The story of / L'Istroja Ta' Budulienko. Horizons. 2013. ISBN 978-99957-38-35-8.
- Wings of a Butterfly. Horizons. 2015. ISBN 978-99957-0-798-9.
- Budulienko and Pinocchio Tale. Rowanvale Books. 2016. ISBN 978-1-911240-44-0.
- Dobrodružné príbehy Budulienka a Pinocchia (e-kniha). Dibuk. 2018. ISBN 978-80-973035-5-6.
- Ježko a líška na cestách (e-kniha). Dibuk. 2018. ISBN 978-80-973073-4-9.
- Budulienkove a Pinnocchiove dobrodružstvá. Self-published. 2021. ISBN 978-80-570-3630-2.
- Ježko a líška na cestách. Self-published. 2022. ISBN 978-80-570-3710-1.
- Osobná anamnéza - koľko vydrží ľudské srdce?. Self-published. 2024. ISBN 978-80-570-5683-6.
