= Ľuba Lesná =

Slovak investigative journalist, filmmaker, novelist, and playwright

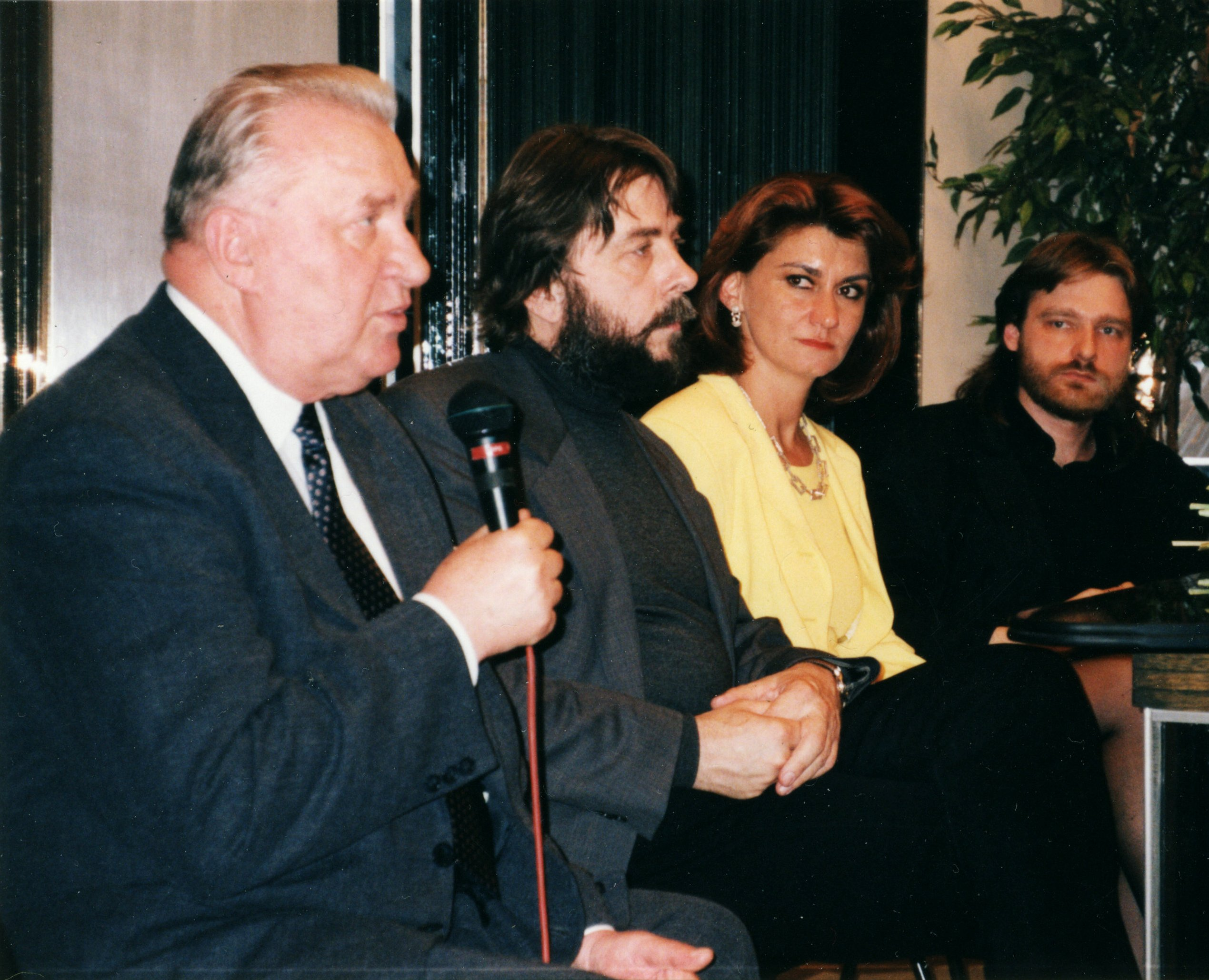
Book launch for The Kidnapping of the President's Son, October 1998. (From left: Michal Kováč, former President, Slovak Republic; Ladislav Snopko, former Slovak Minister of Culture; Ľuba Lesná; and Marián Balázs, former priest.)

Ľuba Lesná (born 21 March 1954) is a contemporary Slovak investigative journalist, filmmaker, novelist, and playwright. While her earlier work focused on plays, since Czechoslovakia's Velvet Revolution she has worked primarily as a journalist, writing also several books and a novel, Prípad medička (The Medical Student Case), being rewritten as a play. Lesná worked with Prime Minister Iveta Radičová, as an analyst in the Slovak Office of the Government from 2010-2012.

== Education ==
- Faculty of Arts, Comenius University, Bratislava

== Professional Biography ==
- Verejnosť newspaper, deputy chief editor
- 1990-1992: Czechoslovak public television
- 1992-1997: Radio Free Europe, reporter & political analyst
- 1997-2002: Slovak Television, reporter & political talk show host
- 2004-2005: Joj Television
- 2006-2009: The Slovak Spectator, reporter & political affairs writer
- 2010-2012: Office of the Government, Slovak Republic, analyst

== Books ==
Non-fiction

- Únos prezidentovho syna, alebo, Krátke dejiny tajnej služby [The Kidnapping of the President's Son, or a Short History of the Secret Service] (1998). Bratislava: GMT. ISBN 80-967947-0-1
- Únos demokracie. Zo zákulisia slovenskej tajnej služby [The Abduction of Democracy. The Slovak Secret Service Backstage] (2001). Prague: G plus G (ISBN 80-86103-46-3); and Bratislava: Institute for Public Affairs (IVO) (ISBN 80-88935-20-2).

"two ... books about the most famous cases linked to the country’s intelligence service (SIS) between 1994 and 1998"

- Radičová, Iveta, and Ľuba Lesná. Krajina hrubých čiar [Country of Full Stops] (2013). Bratislava: Ikar. ISBN 978-80-551-3427-7

Fiction

- Prípad medička [The Medical Student Case] (2007), a novel. Bratislava: Petrus. ISBN 978-80-89233-26-7

"...based on a real murder committed in 1976. The book is a grotesque picture of the totalitarian system in the former Czechoslovakia."

"In the 1980s a young doctor was killed and 8 people arrested for murdering her ... But a question remains – what really happened?"

== Film ==
- Únos demokracie [The Abduction of Democracy] (2002), documentary, with Mário Homolka, director

"...a documentary film about the 1995 abduction of Michal Kováč, Jr., son of the former Slovak president..., which some believe was carried out by allies of former Prime Minister Vladimir Meciar within the SIS secret service."

== Plays ==
- Skamenelina [The Fossil] (1986) -- for radio
- Klytaimnéstra [The Klytaimnéstra] (1988)
- Báthoryčka [Madame Báthory] (1988)
- Slová, slová, slová [Words, words, words] (1988)

== Awards ==
- The Czechoslovak Egon Erwin Kisch Prize for non-fiction, 1999, for Únos prezidentovho syna [The Kidnapping of the President's Son]
- Investigative Journalism Award, for courage, 2007, Institute for Public Affairs (IVO), Slovak Republic
- First Place, Slovak Journalism Awards, 2007, Slovak Syndicate of Journalists (for "Cervanová Witnesses Break 30-Year Silence", The Slovak Spectator, December 18, 2006)
- Second Place, Slovak Journalism Awards, 2009, Slovak Syndicate of Journalists (for "Border Killings Remain Unpunished Decades Later", The Slovak Spectator, October 13, 2008)

== Reviews ==
"The novel Prípad medička [The Medical Student Case] is and is not about the actual murder of medical student Ľudmila Cervanová. It is, because Ľuba Lesná became familiar with this affair over a long period of time and discovered many facts and a lot of information used in the book. And it is not, because the novel is written as a literary fiction about the abduction and murder of a character, medical student Alena Hronská. Why did the famous author of non-fiction books (The Abduction of the President's Son, The Abduction of Democracy) not stick to pure facts this time? And why did she decide to risk telling her own version of this affair? Because, as she says herself in the book's introduction, according to pure facts and documents it should be clear to readers that this case did not take place the way that official police and judicial versions described it. The question — so what happened? — remains unanswered." (Martin Mojžiš, .týždeň )

"Just make sure nobody ever finds out what really happened. I have borrowed this sentence from Ľuba Lesná’s book, Prípad medička (Petrus Publishers, 238 pp)... One can’t help asking — could all this really be true? Because, if the murder of the medical student really happened the way the author describes it (and I hasten to add that personally I find it quite plausible) why has the truth not prevailed? The answer is probably in the times we live in, in our reality that easily turns lies into truth... While reading Ľuba Lesná’s latest book I could not get the first sentence from Péter Esterházy out of my head: 'It’s bloody hard to lie if one does not know the complete truth.' And I don’t mean the book’s 'heroes', the ŠtB officers... Luckily, the medical student’s sad story reminds us that the truth, even if revealed only in part, has the power to awaken our conscience, albeit painfully, with adrenaline throbbing in our veins. That is why politicians and many public officials consider it an unwanted commodity." (Štefan Markuš, SME)

"'The time is not yet right for me to speak the truth about the medical student’s case, he said in his unforgettable sonorous voice...' I quote from the book Prípad medička by Ľuba Lesná, inspired — quite openly — by Ľudmila Cervanová’s murder. Although it is a work of fiction, the author cannot hide the fact that she is a journalist par excellence, or her extraordinary personal commitment to uncovering the centre of the disgusting octopus, the nerve centre of an operation that entangled and destroyed six innocent lives. Ľuba Lesná seems to have intimate knowledge of all these horrors and because 'the time is not yet right' for the truth to come out, she had to do it herself, by turning Cervanová’s case into fiction. I salute you, Mrs. Lesná!..." (Lucia Piussi, .týždeň)

"If the adversary in a detective story is a simpleton, the discovery of his identity is rarely pleasurable for the reader... The author of the novel demonstrates on a broad scale that everything in this case was fabricated by the communist intelligence service (ŠtB). All the ambitious investigator wanted to do was to indict as many young people as possible and he couldn't care less whether they were guilty or not, or if they had the means to commit the crime or not. Eventually the reader finds out that everything boils down to the so-called Arab link—the terrorist training facility for Arab students at Piešťany airport." (Michal Schuster, Knižná revue)
