= Výčapy-Opatovce =

Výčapy-Opatovce Vicsápapáti
- Municipality
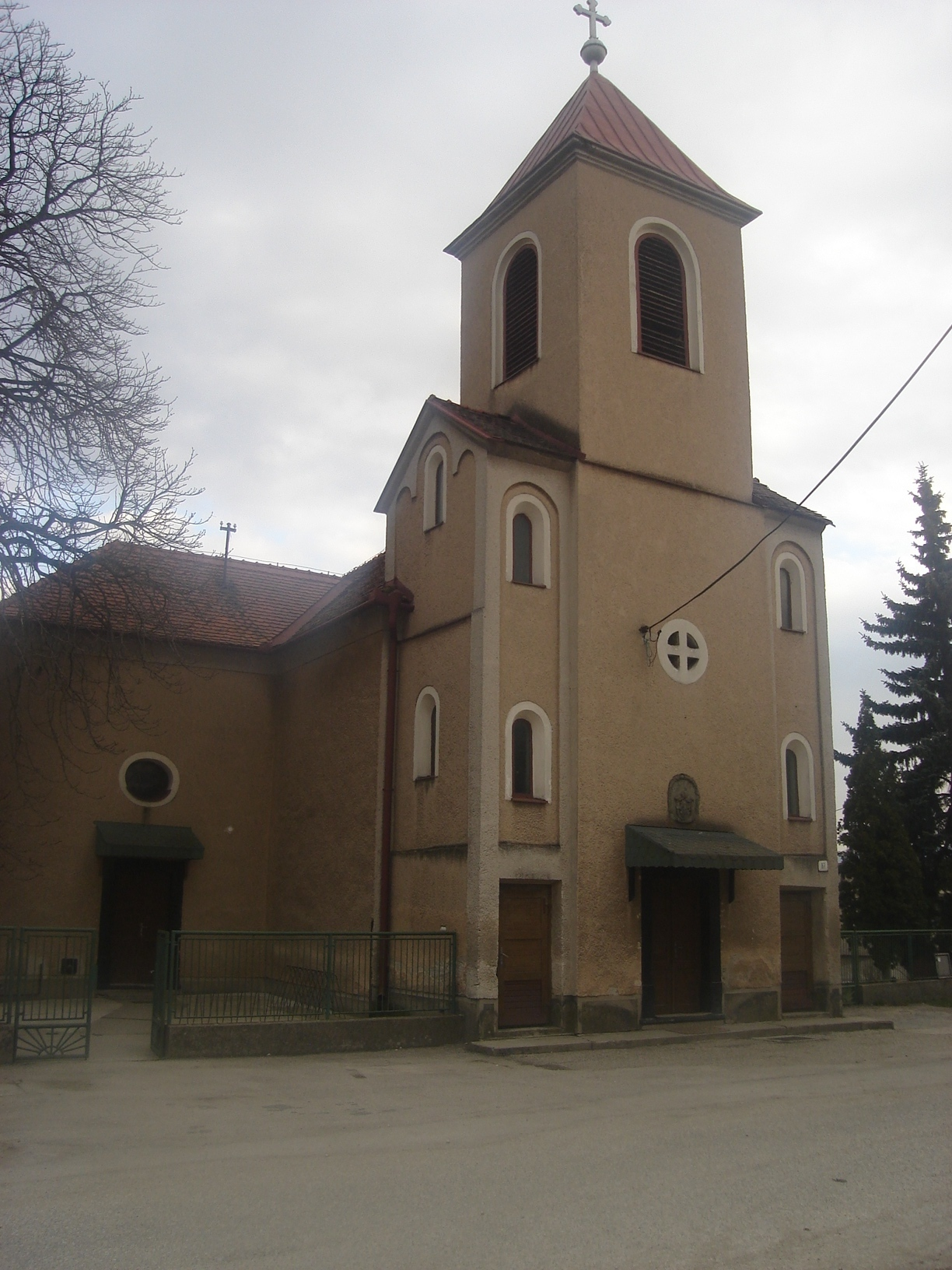
- Church of all Saints

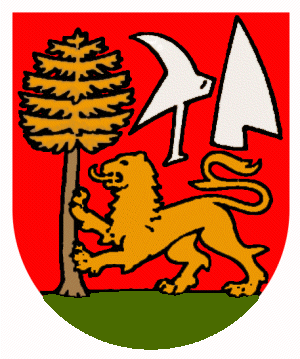
- Flag Coat of arms

- Location of Výčapy-Opatovce in the Nitra Region Location of Výčapy-Opatovce in Slovakia
- Coordinates: 48.42°N 18.08°E
- Country: Slovakia
- Region: Nitra Region
- District: Nitra District
- First mentioned: 1247

Area
  - Total: 14.18 km^{2} (5.47 sq mi)
- Elevation: 152 m (499 ft)

Population (2025)
  - Total: 2,139
- Time zone: UTC+1 (CET)
  - Summer (DST): UTC+2 (CEST)
- Postal code: 951 44
- Area code: +421 37
- Vehicle registration plate (until 2022): NR
- Website: www.vycapy-opatovce.sk

Výčapy-Opatovce (Slovak pronunciation: [ˈʋiːtʂapi ˈɔpatɔwtse]; Hungarian: Vicsápapáti) is a village and municipality in the Nitra District in western central Slovakia, in the Nitra Region. It lies on the halfway between Topoľčany and Nitra.

== History ==
In historical records the village was first mentioned in 1247.

== Geography ==
The municipality lies at an altitude of 152 metres (499 ft) and covers an area of 14.18 km^{2} (5.47 sq mi) (2025).

== Coat of arms ==
The Coat of Arms of village Výčapy is from 1717 and represents vineyard knife and plough on the red field. The Coat of Arms of village Opatovce comes from the year 1781 and displays a lion climbing on the coniferous tree in the green meadow.

Both coats have been combined and recognized by heraldic committee, and authorized by municipal council. However, nobody knows who really owned the Opatovce's coat of arms.

== Population ==
Population statistic (10 years)
Year	1995	2005	2015	2025
Count	2094	2141	2178	2139
Difference		+2.24%	+1.72%	−1.79%

Population statistic
Year	2024	2025
Count	2137	2139
Difference		+0.09%

It has a population of 2139 people (31 December 2025).

=== Ethnicity ===
Census 2021 (1+ %)
Ethnicity	Number	Fraction
Slovak	2108	95.94%
Not found out	55	2.5%
Hungarian	49	2.23%
Total	2197	

In year 2021 was 2197 people by ethnicity 2108 as Slovak, 55 as Not found out, 49 as Hungarian, 21 as Other, 8 as Czech, 1 as Romani, 1 as Rusyn and 1 as Croatian.

Note on population: The difference values of population numbers in the table "Population statistic" and in the sections "Ethnicity" & "Religion" is caused by the use of various statistical methods.

=== Religion ===
Census 2021 (1+ %)
Religion	Number	Fraction
Roman Catholic Church	1795	81.7%
None	277	12.61%
Not found out	65	2.96%
Total	2197	

In year 2021 was 2197 people by religion 1795 from Roman Catholic Church, 277 from None, 65 from Not found out, 15 from Evangelical Church, 13 from Other and not ascertained christian church, 11 from Greek Catholic Church, 6 from Ad hoc movements, 5 from Christian Congregations in Slovakia, 4 from Calvinist Church, 4 from Other, 1 from Buddhism and 1 from Apostolic Church.
