= Hana Ponická =

Slovak politician (1922–2007)

Hana Ponická (July 15, 1922 Halič, Czechoslovakia – August 21, 2007 Banská Bystrica, Slovakia) was a Slovak writer and former anti-Communist dissident. She opposed the Communist government of the former Czechoslovakia.

Ponická signed the Charter 77 human rights manifesto in 1977. Charter 77 was inspired by Václav Havel, a Czech dissident and playwright who later became president of the Czech Republic after the breakup of Czechoslovakia.

Ponická was arrested in August 1989 for observing the anniversary of the crushing of Czechoslovakia's democracy movement by the Warsaw Pact in 1968. She was released from jail three months later.

Ponická helped found the Christian Democratic Movement, a major Slovak political party, following the collapse of Communism in Czechoslovakia at the end of 1989.

Hana Ponická, 85, died in Banská Bystrica, Slovakia on August 21, 2007, the 39th anniversary of the invasion of Czechoslovakia. A spokesman for the Christian Democratic Movement, Martin Krajcovic, did not give a cause of death. Ponická was buried in Halič, her native village located in southern Slovakia.
