= Zuzka Zguriška =

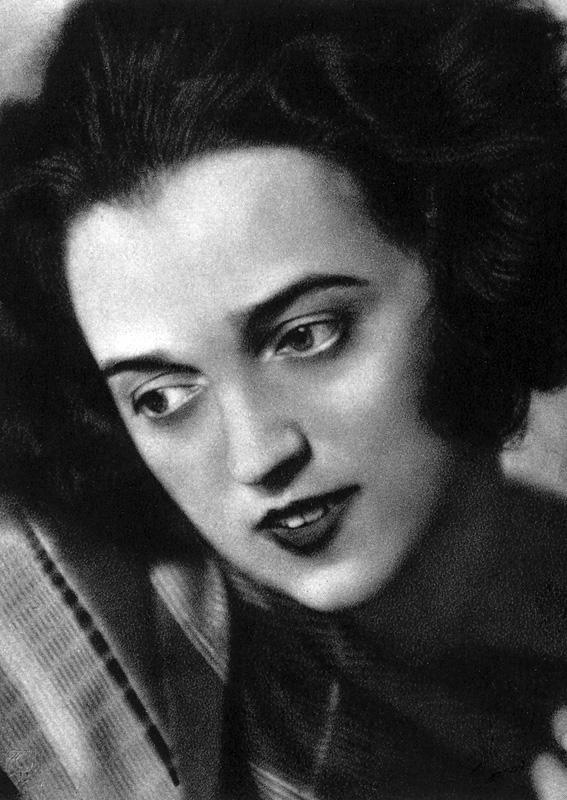
- Slovak writer
- Born: 13 April 1900; Myjava, Austria-Hungary (now Slovakia)
- Died: 24 September 1984 (aged 84); Prague, Czechoslovakia (now Czech Republic)
- Occupations: novelist, playwright, translator, actress
- Writing career
- Genre: novel - fiction

Zuzka Zguriška (13 April 1900 – 24 September 1984), born as Ľudmila Šimonovičová, married Dvořáková, was a Slovak novelist, play-writer and translator, and occasional actress. Zguriška is a belated representative of classical Slovak Realism.

== Biography ==
She was born in a family of teachers and education acquired within Myjave, Modra, one year passed in Himmelkrone (Bavaria), later studied at the teachers' college in Hungarian Hódmezővásárhelyi from there to cross at a teacher training college in Serbian Subotica, finally she graduated in 1920 at the Institute of Education teachers in Brno. From 1920 to 1924, she worked as a teacher at Myjave, she married and moved to Bratislava, where she lived until 1945. During World War II, he graduated from the Philosophical Faculty of Comenius University, Department of Philosophy and Art History. In 1945, she moved with her husband in Prague. In the years 1949–1951, worked at the Barrandov Studios as a film scriptwriter, then devoted to literature. In 1960, she was awarded the title deserved artist.

== Creation ==
Her first work published in 1922 in the Slovak daily and gradually began to contribute to other magazines and newspapers (Workers Newspaper, Živena, Elan, Slovak Perspectives et al.). Also he cooperated with the Czechoslovak Radio, which regularly has published her work, pay and the theater, but for health reasons refused a permanent contract, although it has had great success as an actress (she performed in Slovak National Theatre ). In his literary works he tried to introduce distinctive world Myjava Kopanice, which was administered from the humorous page. In short literary forms he caught a lot of pages characteristic of life in his native land, painted a lot of interesting characters, and also used a lot of humorous events. When writing based on their own knowledge and experiences.

== Works ==
- Bičianka z Doliny [Bičianka from the Valley] (1938), novel
- Metropola pod slamou [Metropolis under the Straw] (1949), trilogy, vol. 1
- Mestečko na predaj [Small Town for sale] (1953), trilogy vol. 2.
- Zbojnícke chodníčky 1959, trilogy vol. 3
