= Lucia Piussi =

Slovak actress and singer

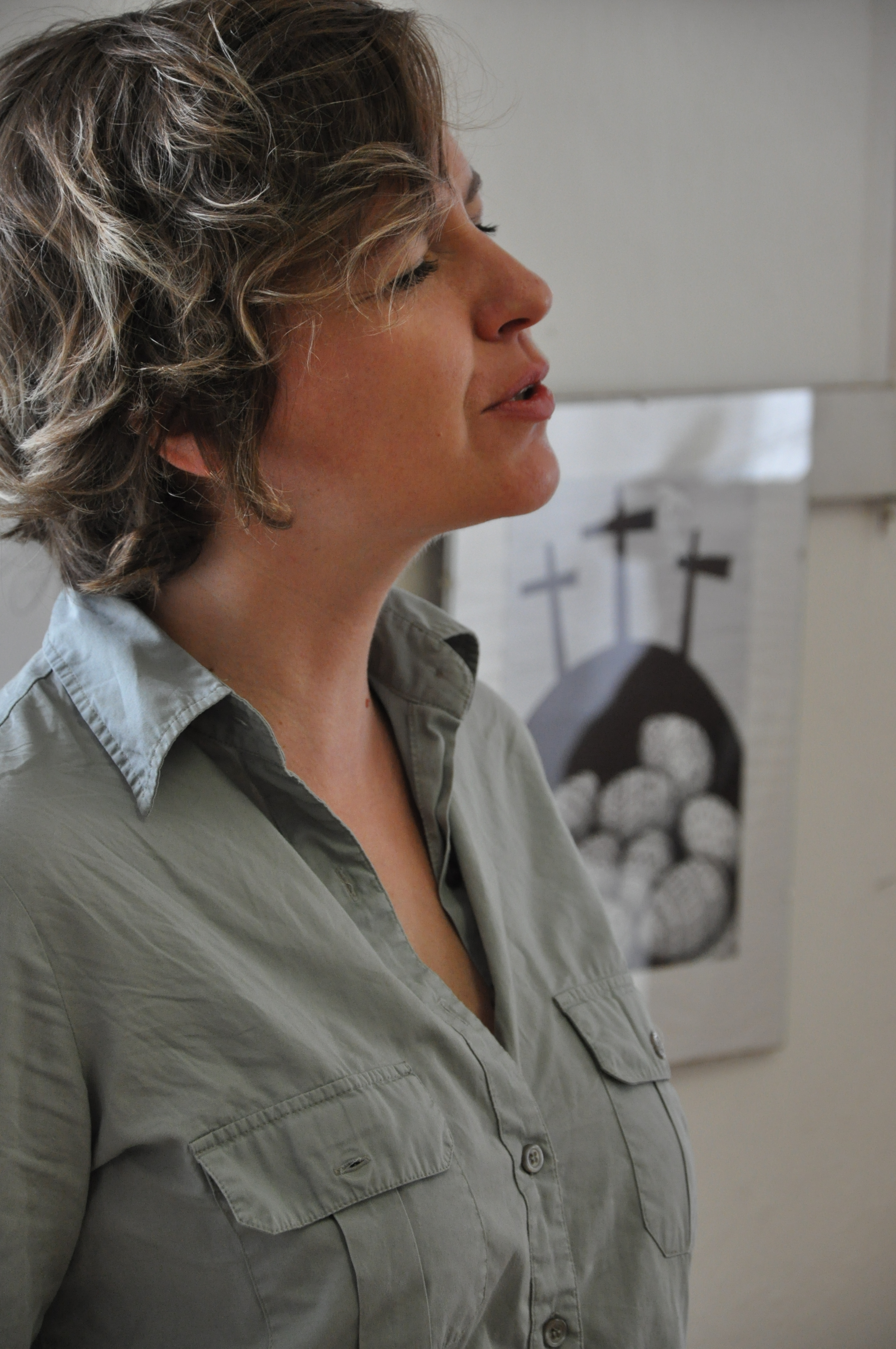
Lucia Piussi (2012)

Lucia Piussi (born 21 October 1971) is a Slovak actress and rock singer. She has played Bratislava's Stoka Theatre often, and is the frontwoman of rock band Živé kvety. Piussi studied at the Academy of Performing Arts (VŠMU) in Bratislava.

== Discography ==
- 12 + 1, Slnko records 2008
- Bez konca, Živé kvety, Slnko records 2007
- Sloboda, Živé kvety, Slnko records 2005
- Na mojej ulici, Živé kvety, Slnko records 2004
- V dobrom aj v zlom, Živé kvety, Pavian records 2003
- Živé kvety, Živé kvety, Mediálny inštitút 2000

== Theatre ==
- Strata (Multimediálna grcanica), premiere 21. 12. 2004
- Gala (Kto rozjebal Betlehem), premiere 9. 6. 2003
- Bol-a som nevinn -ý -á, I Was Innocent, premiere 1. 9. 2002
- Komisia, premiere 12. 4. 2002
- Z diaľky, premiere 17. 12. 1999
- Hetstato (Hystericko-zúfalý výkrik šialenstva), premiere 17. 9. 1999
- Prepad (Estráda), premiere 31. 12. 1998
- Dno (Óda na McWorld), premiere 19. 12. 1998
- Tváre, premiere 19. 12. 1997
- Monodrámy, premiere 29. 11. 1997
- Nox (Kto uhádne meno berného úradníka), premiere 10. 2. 1995
- Eo ipso, premiere 4. 3. 1994
- Nikto, len čajka si omočí nohy v mojich slzách, premiere 29. 5. 1993
- Donárium (Metamorfóza premien), premiere 19. 12. 1992
- Vres (Optimistická), premiere 10. 10. 1992
- Slepá baba (inscenácia aj pre deti), premiéra 3. 4. 1992
- Dyp inaf (Heavy mental), premiéra 6. 12. 1991
- Impasse (Sentimental journey), premiéra 22. 6. 1991
