= Viera Prokešová =

Slovak writer and translator (1957–2008)

Viera Prokešová (2 August 1957 – 31 December 2008) was a Slovak writer and translator.

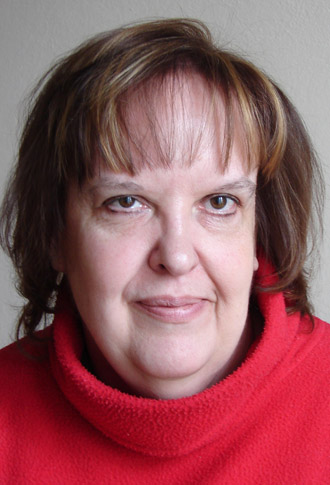
Viera Prokešová

== Biography ==
She was born in Bratislava and studied Slovak and Bulgarian at Comenius University. She worked as a producer at the Puppet Theatre in Nitra for a year. In 1982, she began work as an editor at a Slovak publishing house. She also worked as an editor for the weekly literary magazine Kultúrny život. In 2000, she started working for the Institute of World Literature at the Slovak Academy of Sciences.

She died in Bratislava at the age of 51. Prokešová's poetry began appearing in literary magazines in 1976. Her first collection Cudzia (A strange women) was published in 1984; she received the Ivan Krasko Prize for best first work. Her poems have appeared in translations into German, Bulgarian, French and Latvian in various publications. She translated poetry in Bulgarian and French into Slovak; she also translated several children's books.

== Selected works ==
- Slnečnica (Sunflower), poetry (1988)
- Retiazka (The Little Chain), poetry (1992)
- Pleť (Complexion), poetry (1998)
- Krídla z vosku (Wings of Wax by Mihai Eminescu), translation (2008), received the Ján Hollý Award
