= Mila Haugová =

Slovak poet (born 1942)

- Born: 14 June 1942 (age 83); Budapest

Mila Haugová (born 14 June 1942) is a Slovak poet.

== Life ==
Haugová was born in Budapest on 14 June 1942, but she moved around with her family as a child, living in Vráble, Nitra, Breziny, Zlaté Moravce and Levice. Between 1951 and 1952 her father was a political prisoner. After attending college in Nitra, she worked as an agronomist, before becoming a secondary school teacher.

She went to Canada following the 1968 Warsaw Pact invasion of Czechoslovakia, but returned to Czechoslovakia the following year. She published her early poetry book called Rusty Clay (Hrdzavá hlina) in 1980 under the name Mila Srnková. In 1986 she started a decade-long stint as editor of the literary magazine Romboid. After this she earned her living translating from German and writing and living in Bratislava and Levice. in 1990 she published the book Čisté dni, which was based on the drawings of her partner, Peter Ondreička. Ondreička died in the same year. She published Atlas piesku and Genotext in 2011.
