= Ján Brezina =

Slovak poet, literary historian and theoretician

Ján Brezina (1 January 1917 in Východná – 4 August 1997 in Bratislava) was a Slovak poet, literary historian and theoretician.

He was an employee of the Slovak Academy of Sciences starting in 1943, of the Slovak Matica and from 1970 - 1973 director of the Institute for Literal History of the Slovak Academy of Sciences.

== Works ==
Poems:

- Nikdy sa nestretnem ("I will never meet")
- Okrídlený deň ("A day with wings")
- Nočné bdenie ("Night waking")
- Horúcou linkou (By a hotline")

Literary history:

- Slovenská poézia v revolučných rokoch 1917-1922 (Slovak poetry in the revolutionary years 1917-1922)
