= Dana Podracká =

Slovak writer (born 1954)

Dana Podracká (born 9 March 1954) is a Slovak writer. She is considered one of the leading women poets in Slovakia.

She was born in Banská Štiavnica and was educated there, going on to study psychology at Comenius University. Podracká worked at the Psychological Institute and as an editor at the Slovenský spisovateľ publishing house. In 1991, she began work for the weekly literary journal Literárny týždenník, later becoming deputy chief editor.

She published her first collection of poetry Mesačná milenka (Moon lover) in 1981; it received the Ivan Krasko Prize for best new work. Her poems have appeared in translation in various literary journals and anthologies.

== Awards ==
She received the Witold Hulewicz Prize in 2004.

== Selected works ==
- Rubikon (Rubicon), poetry (1988)
- Nezabudni na vílu (Don't Forget the Good Fairy), children's literature (1991)
- Mytológia súkromia (Mythology of Privacy), essay (1994)
- Hriech (Sin), poetry (1996)
- Jazyky z draka. Mytológia slovenských rozprávok (The Tongues from a Dragon. The Mythology of Slovakian Fairy Tales), essay (2002)
- Zielpunkt. Mýtus o vernosti (Zielpunkt. The Myth of Faithfulness), essay (2005)
- Hysteria Siberiana, essay (2009)
- Mávnutie krídel (42 haiku od 11 slovenských básnikov) (The Wave of Wings (42 haiku by 11 Slovak poets)), haiku anthology, with others (2011)
