= Radovan Brenkus =

Slovak writer, translator and critic

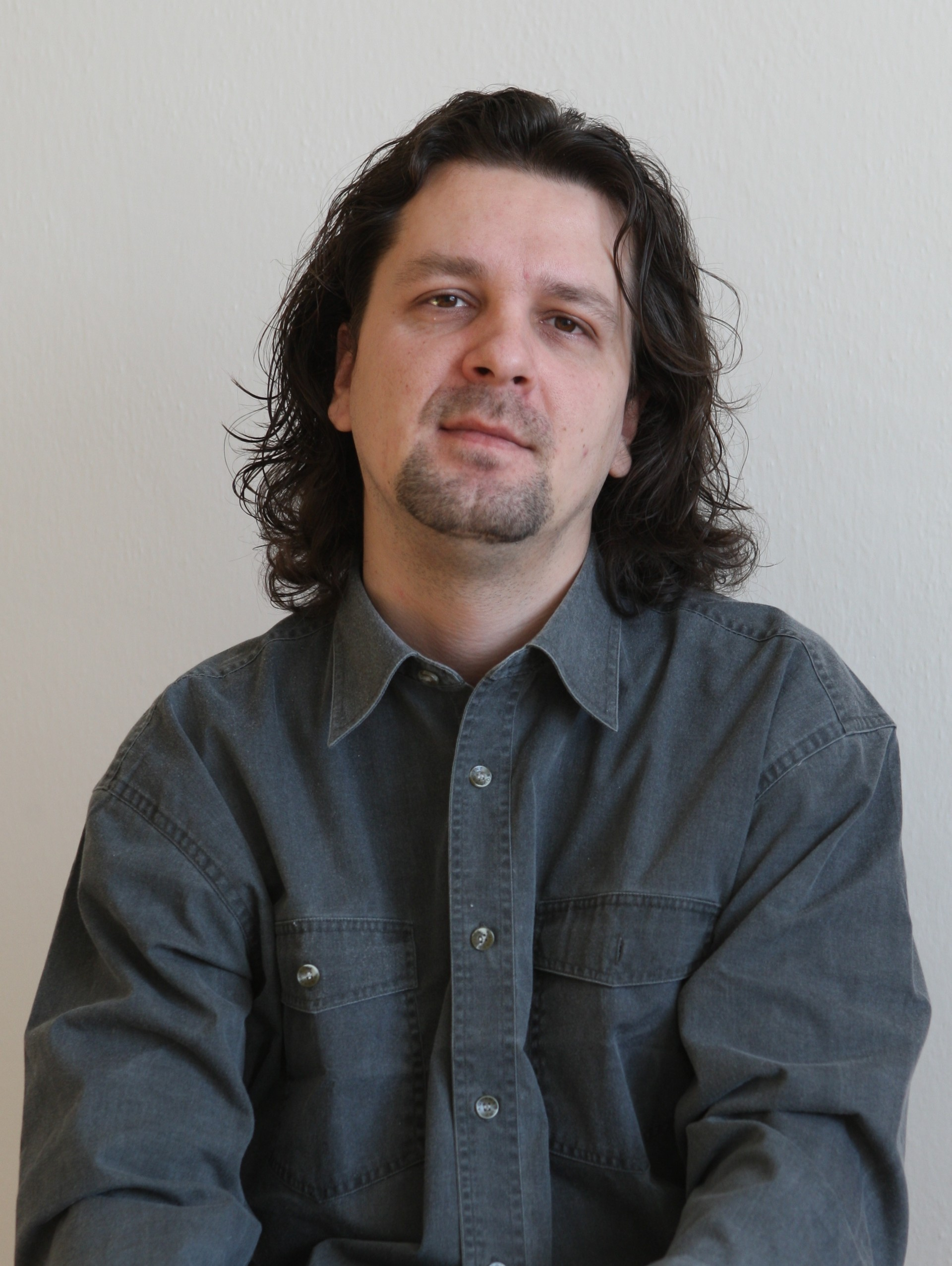
- Slovak writer, translator and critic
- Born: 30 January 1974; Bardejov, Czechoslovakia
- Writing career
- Notable work: Hell Returns

Radovan Brenkus (born 30 January 1974, Bardejov) is a Slovak writer, translator and critic.

== Biography ==
The author finished the study at Science faculty of P. J. Šafárik University, in mathematics and physics. He worked as a teacher in Košice, later as a specialist worker at the Institute of Experimental Physics of Slovak Academy of Sciences. He publishes in journals at home and abroad. Slovak Radio broadcast a lot of his works, which have been published in international anthologies. He translates works from Polish and occasionally undertakes literary criticism, writing a critical studies and essays. The author works in publishing house Pectus in Košice, which was founded in 2006.

== Creation ==
Brenkus is a continuator of literary modernism. In the field of poetry, he observes, analyses and decrypts the chaotic tired world, denounces the prevailing moral circumstances, the differences in its perception from without and within. The inspiratory sources are destructive emptiness, nothingness, limiting pseudo-being. By a symbology of pessimism and decadence, he shows the loneliness of the individual, his more worsening condition and uncertain future.

The motive of his prose is a search for the meaning of existence, awareness of transience, death. Among other things, Brenkus writes in neo-romantic style, as well as criticizes existentialism and the civilization progress which forces a human to find his own survival instinct. Surrealistic characters in author's stories are torn between the ideal and the real, and disturb an accepted order. Through expressive and mystical symbolism, dramatic and grotesque scenes, Brenkus displays rebellion against elitism and decline of contemporary society. He provides a space for catharsis in the condensed and equally distinctive characteristics of the situations and characters.

== Works ==
=== Poetry ===
- 1997 – March of the Dead
- 2002 – Requiem in the Dust
- 2005 – Romance with a will-o'-the-wisp
- 2009 – Smoke from the Realm of Shadows
- 2015 – Dreaming with a Beast (2017, in Polish)

=== Prose ===
- 2005 – Hell Returns (2013, in Polish), short-story collection

=== Translations ===
- 2008 – Zbigniew Domino: Polish Siberiada
- 2009 – Rafał Wojaczek: Letters for Dead Man
- 2010 – Marta Świderska-Pelinko: Taste of Wandering and Eden
- 2017 – Marta Świderska-Pelinko: Where the Violin Cries
- 2020 – Janusz Korczak: Children of the Street
- 2021 – Aldona Borowicz: Stained Glasses in Memory
- 2023 – Maria Konopnicka: Under the Law
- 2024 – Marek Wawrzkiewicz: Little Light
- 2025 – Kazimierz Przerwa-Tetmajer: Abyss
