= Maša Haľamová =

Slovak poet (1908–1995)

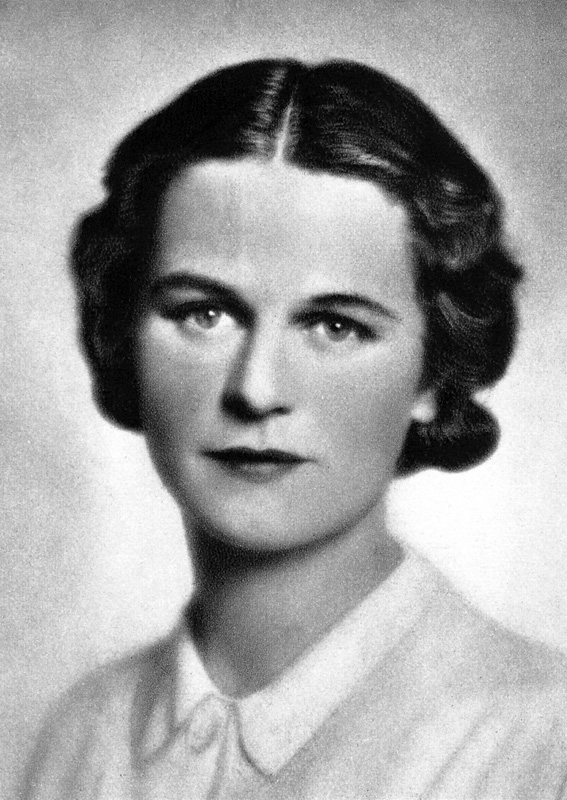
- Born: Mária Pullmanová; 28 August 1908; Blatnica, Austria-Hungary
- Died: 17 July 1995 (aged 86); Bratislava, Slovakia
- Occupations: Poet, translator
- Writing career
- Language: Slovak
- Period: Interwar period
- Genres: Poetry, fairy tales, children's literature
- Notable awards: National Artist
- Movements: Slovak modernism, symbolism

Maša Haľamová (28 August 1908 – 17 July 1995) was a Slovak modernist poet. One of Slovakia's best-known 20th-century poets, she is considered particularly representative of the interwar period in Slovak literature.

== Biography ==
Maša Haľamová was born Mária Pullmanová 1908 in Blatnica, Austria-Hungary. Her father, a saffron merchant, was often away traveling abroad for work. After her mother's early death, she was taken in by one of her teachers who had been friends with her mother.

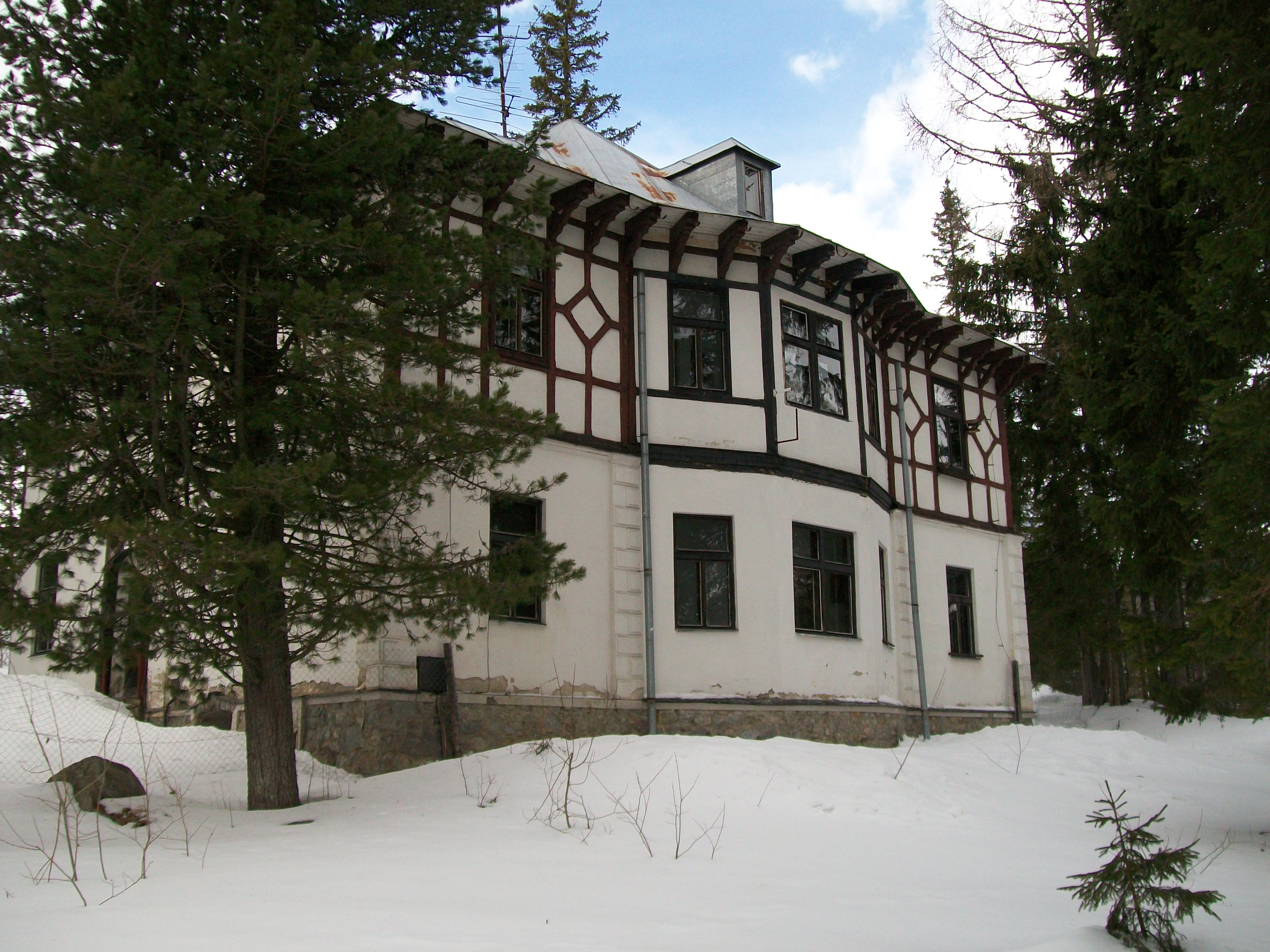
Vila Marína, the home in Štrbské Pleso where Haľamová lived until 1956.

Haľamová went to school in Martin, Slovakia, and in Stara Pazova in what is now Serbia, finishing school in Martin in 1925. After working at the Institute of Culture and Adult Education in Bratislava, she moved in 1926 to Nový Smokovec, a town in the High Tatras, where she worked at a sanatorium. From 1929 to 1930, she left the country briefly and lived in Paris, where she studied French. She spent 30 years living in the High Tatras, settling in Štrbské Pleso with her husband, the doctor Ján Pullman. Her time in the mountainous region was deeply influential on her work as a poet.

Her husband's untimely death came in 1956, after which she left the mountains and moved back to Martin. There, she worked at the Osveta publishing house. Then she worked for another publishing house, the youth-focused Mladé letá in Bratislava, from 1959 until her retirement in 1973.

In addition to her writing and work at publishing houses, she translated literature, primarily for children, into Slovak from Russian, Lusatian-Serbian, and Czech. She was also interested in skiing, serving as the youngest referee at the FIS Nordic World Ski Championships 1935.

In 1983, Haľamová was given the title of National Artist. She died in 1995 in Bratislava.

== Writing ==
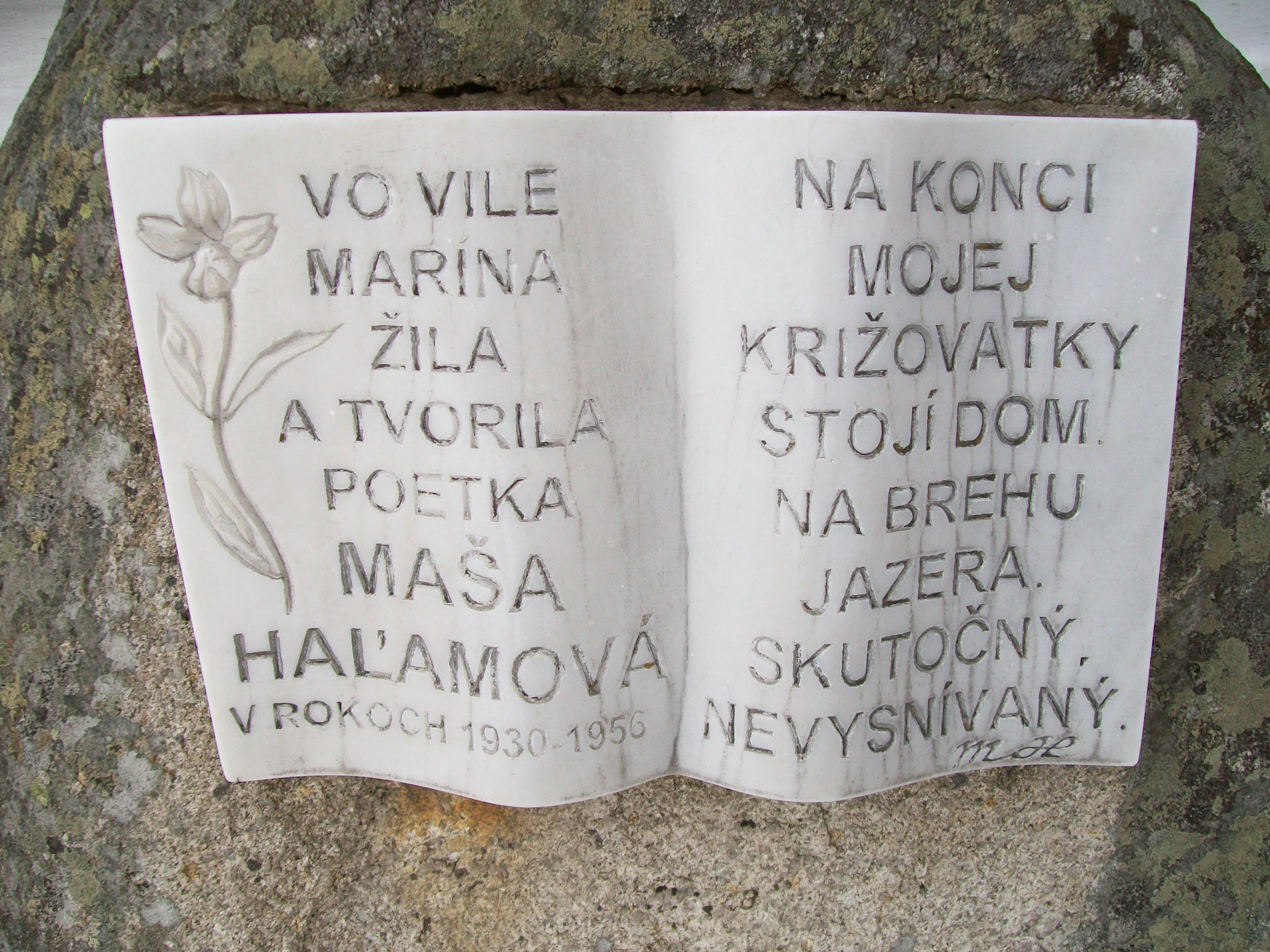
A monument to the poet Maša Haľamová in Štrbské Pleso.

Haľamová is considered one of Slovakia's best-known 20th-century poets, described by some critics as the country's best female poet of the first half of the 20th century.

She started out publishing poetry in various Slovak magazines, including Slovenských pohľadoch, Živene, and Eláne. Her first collection, Dar ("Gift"), appeared in 1928. This book, and her subsequent collection Červený mak, are considered seminal works of the interwar period in Slovakia.

Haľamová's work is characterized as part of Slovakia's modernist wave, incorporating some elements of symbolism. She often wrote in free verse and has been described by critics as a "true master of the brief poetic sketch." Her work is extremely emotional, usually simple and straightforward, with what the literary critic Milan Pišút described as a "child-like fidelity to life." Her poems most often deal with love, disappointment, and passion. Her later poetry is also profoundly marked by the premature death of her husband, particularly the 1966 collection Smrť tvoju žijem. Some of her best-known love poems are "Red Poppy," "Ballad," "The Enchanted Mountain," and "Of May." She also wrote about nature, in particular drawing from her time living in the High Tatra Mountains.

Haľamová was inspired by fellow Slovak poets including Ivan Krasko and Jiří Wolker, sometimes accused of following the latter too closely.

In addition to several individual collections, her collected works were published under the title Básne ("Poems") three times: in 1957, 1972 and 1978. She also wrote collections of fairy tales and poems for children.

== Selected works ==
=== Poetry ===
- Dar (1928)
- Červený mak (1932)
- Básne (1955)
- Smrť tvoju žijem (1966)
- Čriepky (1993)

=== Children's literature ===
- Mechúrik Koščúrik s kamarátmi (1962)
- Petrišorka (1965)
- O sýkorke z kokosového domčeka (1976)

=== Essays ===
- Vzácnejšie než zlato (1988)
- Vyznania (1988)
- Tatranské listy (posthumous, 2001)
