= Hana Zelinová =

Slovak prose writer and dramatist

Hana Zelinová (20 July 1914 in Vrútky – 16 March 2004 in Bratislava) was a Slovak prose writer and dramatist. She wrote several novels influenced by the Slovak social novel and the Scandinavian saga. Zrkadlový most, her first collection of short stories, was published in 1941. Zelinová penned three Ibsenesque plays in the 1940s that dealt with the role of women in urban society.

== Works ==
- Zrkadlový most (The Bridge of Mirrors) (1941)
- Angel's Earth (1946)
- Diablov čardáš (The Devil's Csardas) (1958)
- Elizabeth's Court (1971)
- The Call of Wind (1974)
- The Flower of Fright (1977)
