= Jozef Májek =

Slovak teacher and interbrigadist

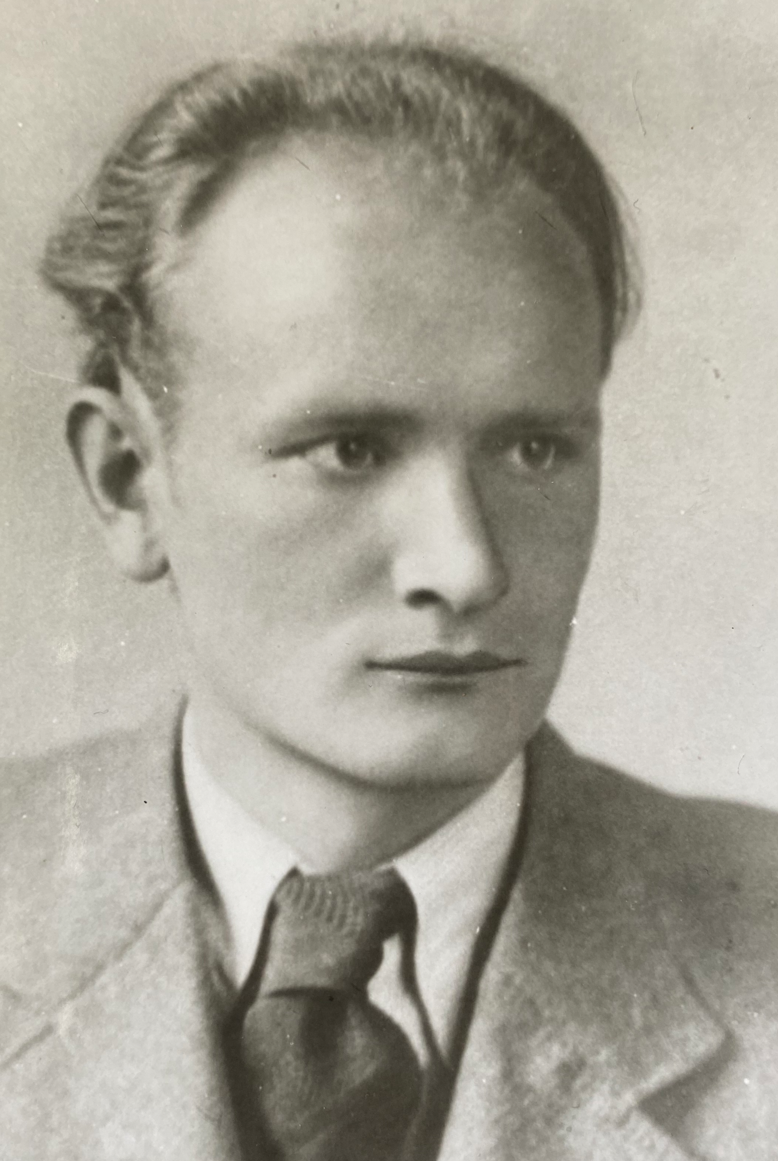
- Born: 15 March 1911; Vienna, Austria-Hungary
- Died: 23 November 1936 (aged 25)
- Resting place: Madrid, Spain
- Known for: Slovak teacher and interbrigadist

Jozef Májek (15 March 1911 – 23 November 1936) was a Slovak teacher and interbrigadist who fought in the Spanish Civil War. He was assigned to the machine gun company of the Thälmann Battalion of the 12th International Brigade, alongside Ladislav Holdoš. Later, he became the commander of the company. He died at the age of 25 during a gunfight with members of the Falange in the siege of Madrid. He is buried in Spain. He was posthumously honoured with the 1st class of the Order of the White Lion for his fight against fascism.

== Personal life and family ==
Jozef Májek was born on 15 March 1911 in Vienna, Austria-Hungary. He was baptized in Vienna as Josef Matthäus at the Maria Treu Church – a baroque parish church of the Piarist Order (Patres Scholarum Piarum) in Josefstadt district of Vienna.

Jozef Májek's parents were Helena Májeková (née Bílková, 1882–1960) and Jozef Májek Sr. (1881–1964), and they came from Bílkove Humence in Slovakia. Jozef Májek Sr. was a member of the Catholic circle in Ružomberok.

Jozef had older siblings: Helena (1905–1997, teacher), Anna (1908–1998, teacher), and younger siblings: František (1913–1999, lawyer), Mária (1915–2006, director of a children's sanatorium in Železnô, head nurse in Ružomberok), Júlia (1919–1991, translator and editor, recipient of the J. Hollý Award and Martinus Nijhoff Translation Prize), Berta (1922–2012, teacher), and Ján (1924–1996, economist).

At the end of 1921, the Májek family moved to Ružomberok, where Jozef Májek Jr. began attending the elementary school. From 1922, he attended the Ružomberok Real Gymnasium (higher form of education).

On 1 April 1932, he started working as a substitute teacher at the elementary school in Vlkolínec. The elementary school in Vlkolínec was one of the smallest in Liptov at that time. Jozef Májek's time in Vlkolínec ended on 28 June 1932, when he registered for the next school year and received his certificate.

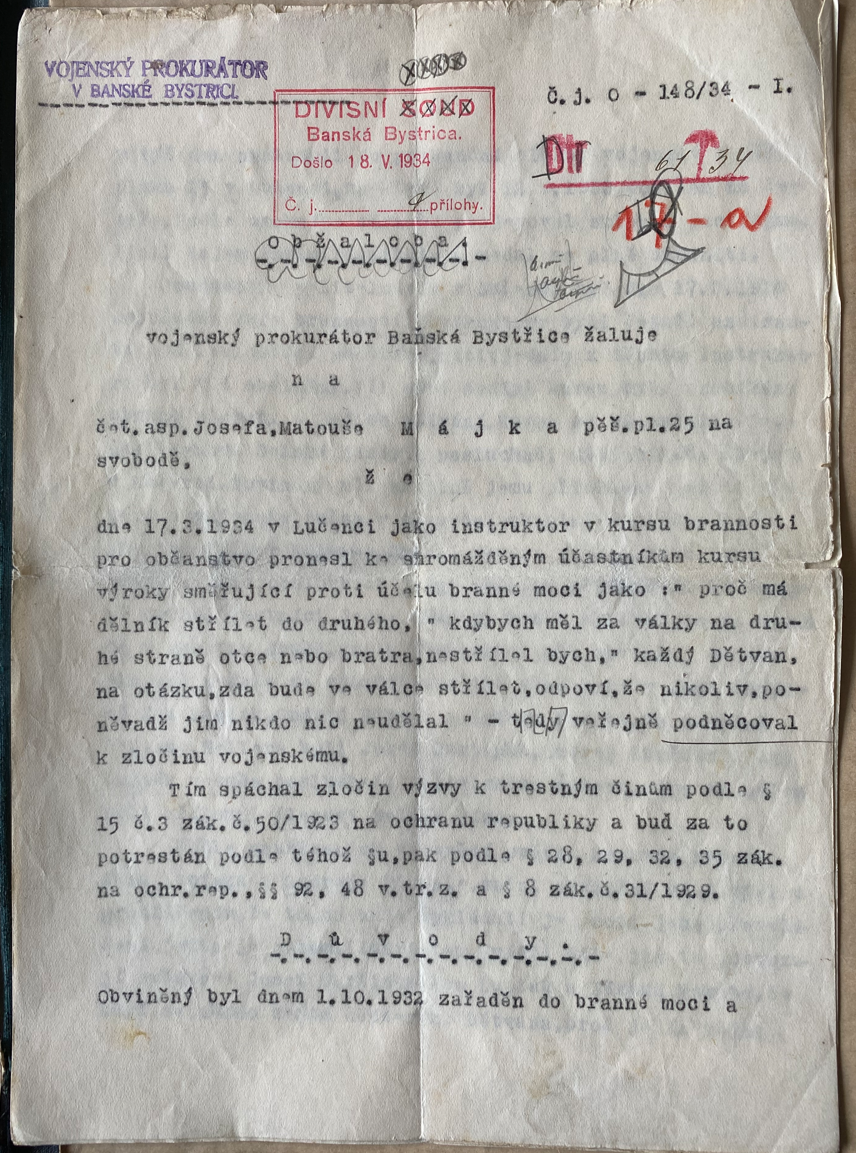
First Page of the Accusation of Open Pacifism.

Jozef Harajevič recalls Jozef Májek's time in Vlkolínec: “Vlkolínec is a village clinging with its life and cottages to the sides of the deepest Liptov mountains. It belongs under Ružomberok. To get from Ružomberok there means covering 8 long kilometres, up and down the valleys along steep and undermined mountain paths. You can hardly make a proper step with a car or wagon. And this is the path Jozef Májek measured every day, up and down. He slept in Ružomberok at his parents’ house to make it cheaper. He taught the children. But the children taught him as well. He helped however he could. He bought pencils, chalks, notebooks, books, and candy for many of them from his meagre salary. Just as he grew close to the children, he surely grew close to the adults, and they to him. They had someone to ask about dealing with an executor, a fiscal officer, the war, rations, interests, excesses, or the town hall. And they say Jozef Májek listened to everything with kindness. He advised everyone. He taught everyone. And when he could, he went to the town hall, threatened, and helped.”

After the school year 1931–1932, Jozef Májek began his mandatory military service. In October 1932, he enlisted in the Košice Military Cadet School. Ružomberok builder Ladislav Króner, who enlisted with him, recalls: “After some time, he became one of the best soldiers. But there were days when, for example, after successfully completing a task at the training ground and receiving praise from the highest officers, the same officers would reprimand him that he had dared to use the main staircase, which was forbidden for the soldiers, instead of the narrow side one. He would give away his last cigarettes and the remaining piece of homemade cake from his mother to his friends. He was always cheerful and thoughtful. At the same time, he was a disciplined soldier, although he was not one to eagerly squeeze his spirit into military regulations.”

Jozef Májek graduated from the cadet school as a sergeant aspirant. He was then transferred to Lučenec, where he was sentenced and demoted for open pacifism to six weeks in prison in Banská Bystrica. After his time in prison, Jozef Májek was considered politically suspicious, which prevented him from continuing his teaching career after completing military service. After his military service, Jozef Májek was unemployed.

Later, he managed to get a job at the People's Bank in Ružomberok.

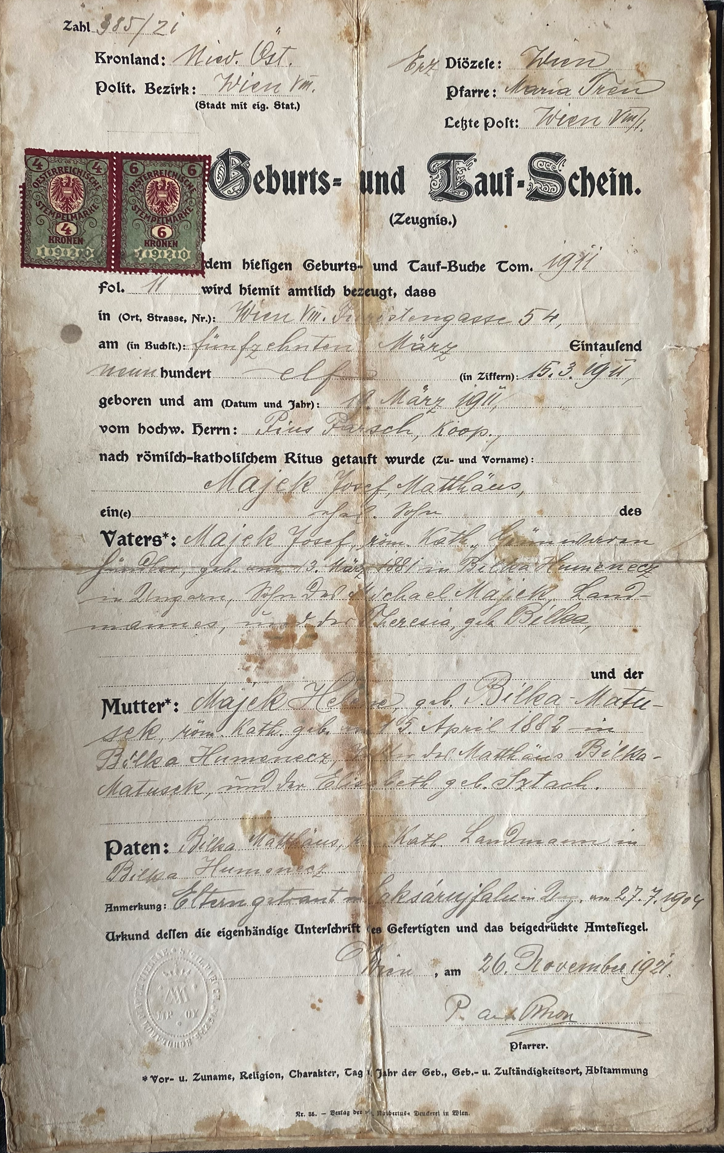
Birth Certificate

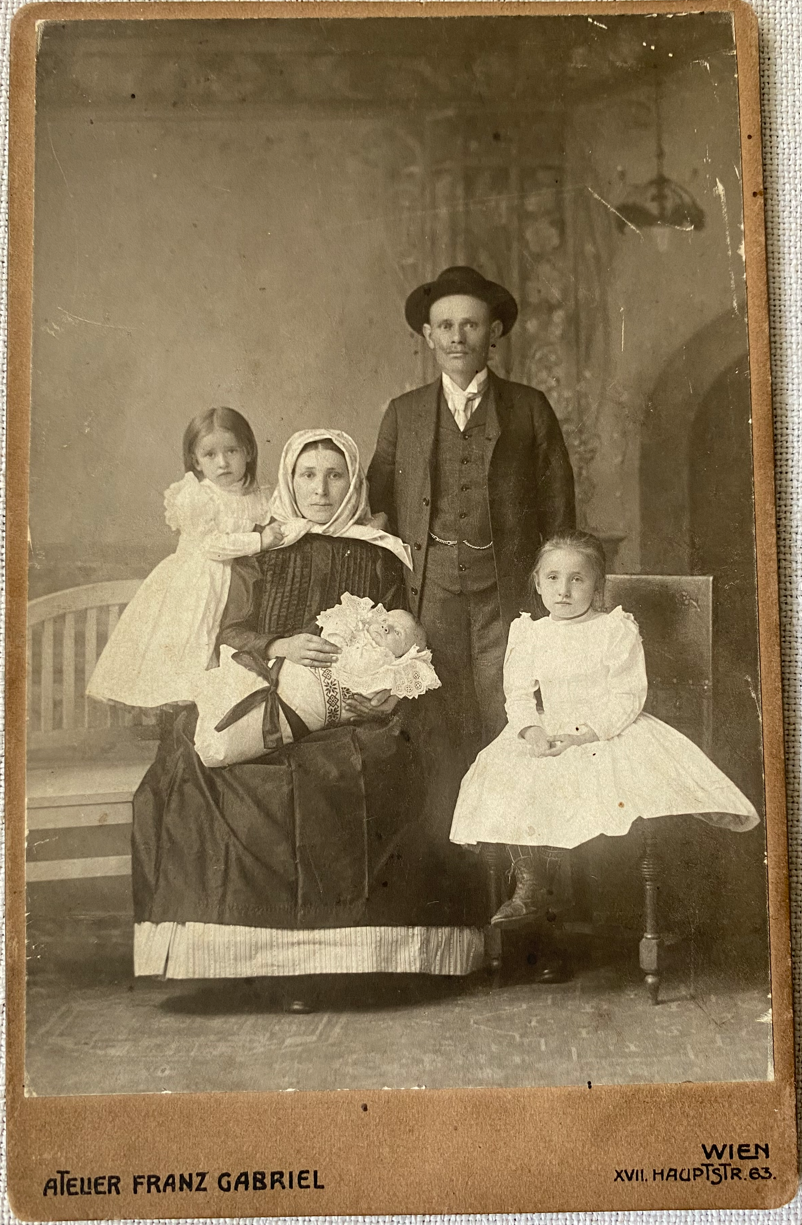
Jozef Májek after birth – parents – Helena and Jozef, siblings – from left, Anna, Jozef, Helena.

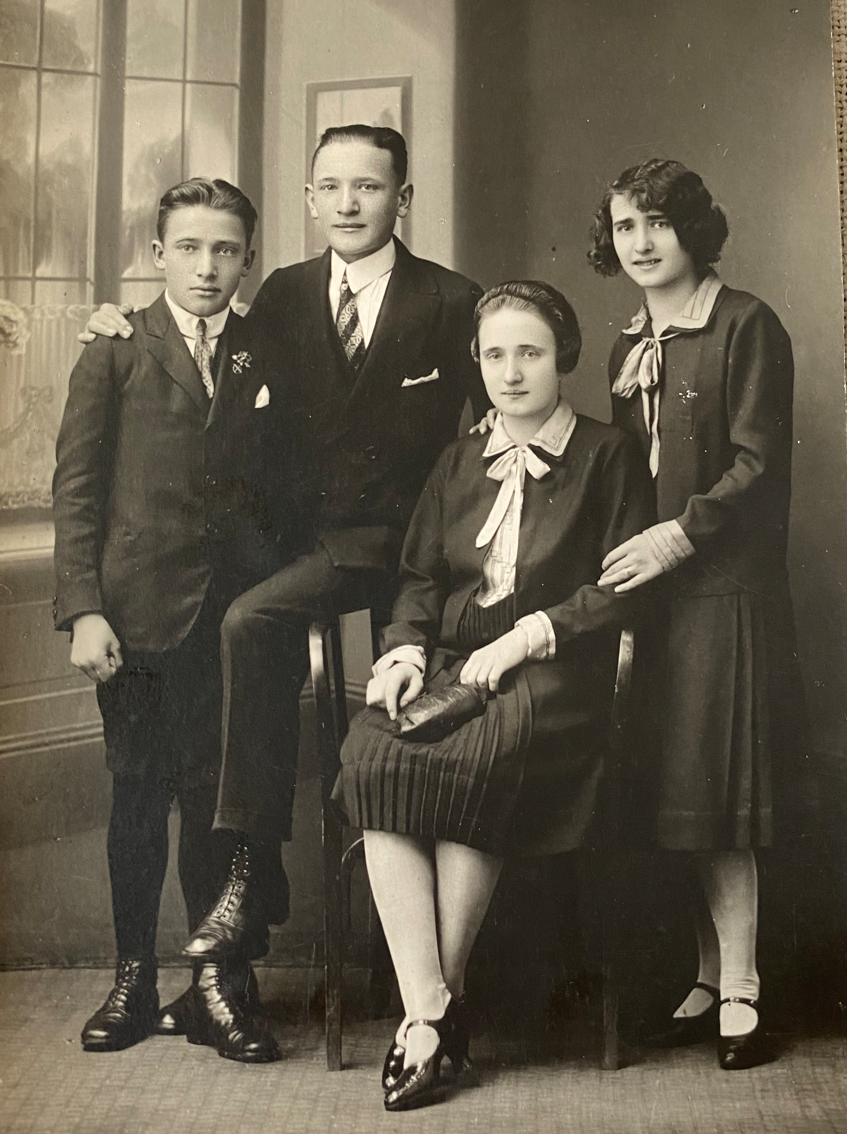
Jozef Májek with siblings – from left, František, Jozef, Helena, Anna.

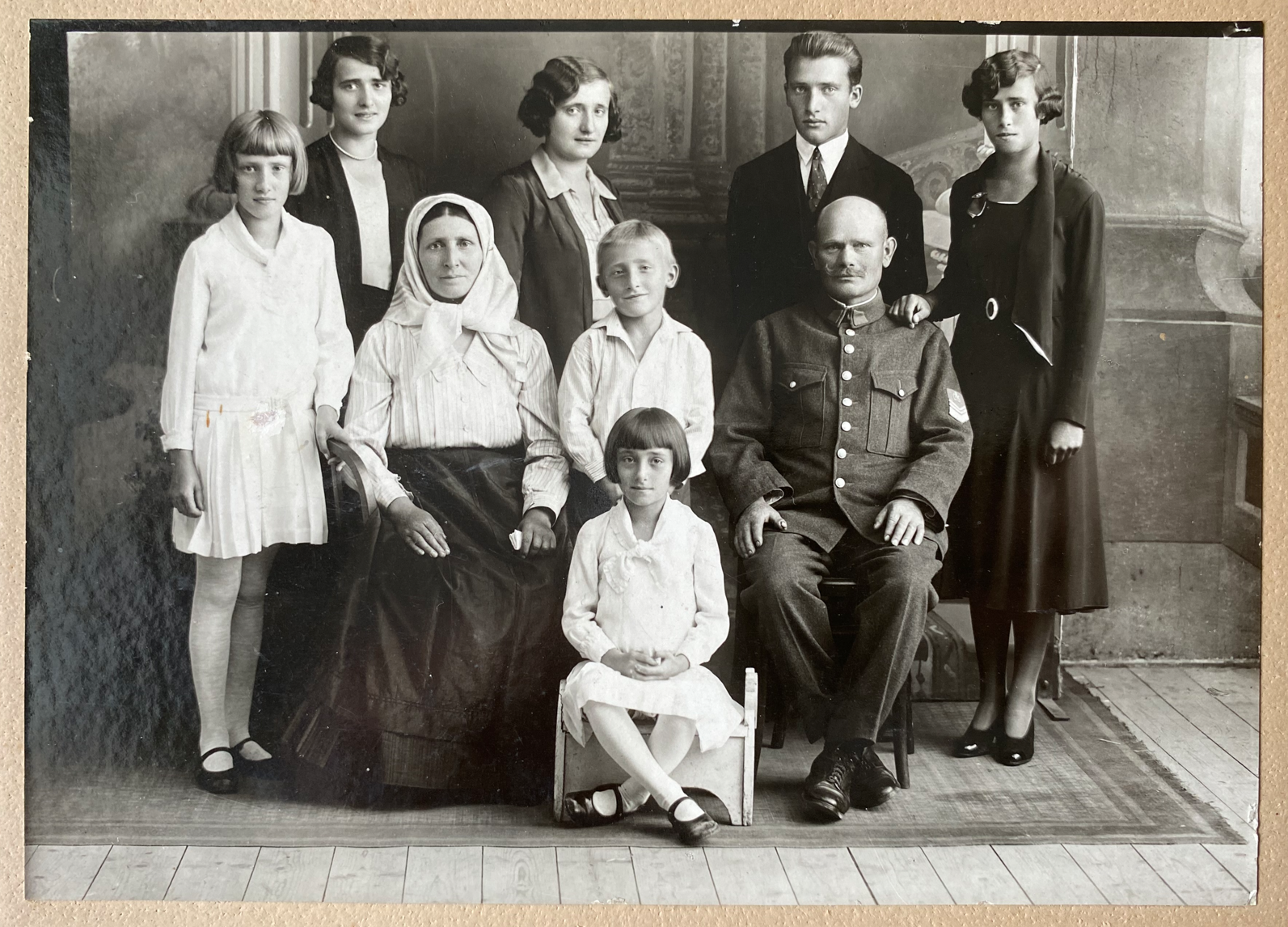
Májek family – family photo after 1936 – top row – Anna, Helena, František, Mária – middle row – Júlia, Helena (mother), Ján, Jozef (father) – bottom row – Berta.

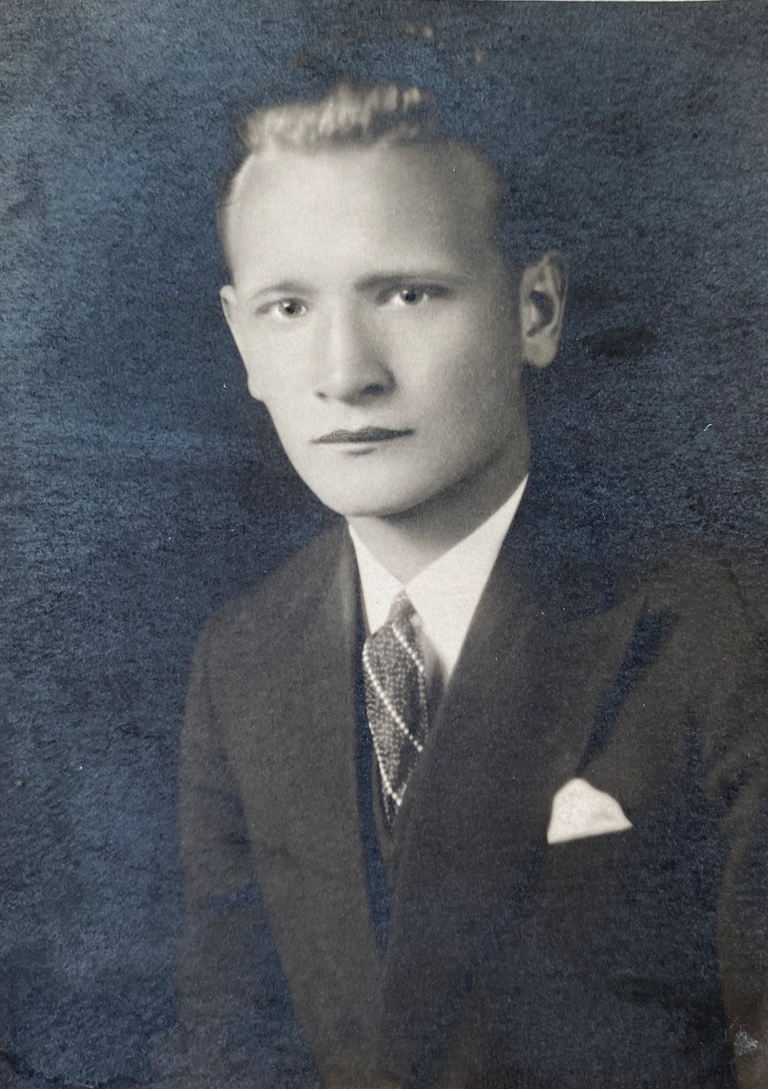
Jozef Májek – graduation photo, 1931–1932.

== Journey to Spain ==
Jozef Májek obtained his passport on 15 September 1936, and his journey from Ružomberok took him to Prague.

There are mentions in presidential files about the travels of the first volunteers from Czechoslovakia. These volunteers typically travelled without luggage and only with the most essential financial means. Their tickets were issued from the Czechoslovak border through the railway stations at Buchs, Basel, Belfort, and Paris. Some volunteers were found to be carrying business cards with the name "Navrátil," which they used after crossing national borders.

In Paris, on 28 October 1936, Ladislav Holdoš sent a letter to the official of the Slovak Bank, Herman Strausz, stating that they would continue their journey. The letter was also signed by Jozef Májek and Mikulec.

Once the volunteers reached France, local contacts in Paris directed them to the central office of the International Brigades, where a man known as "Max" took care of the Czechoslovak volunteers. This was likely Samuel Botha, who later went to Spain himself and was killed in the fighting at the Ebro River in September 1938.

The journey for volunteers from Paris to Spain was relatively simple in the early months, thanks to the leniency of French authorities and well-organized transport. The land route mostly used regular train line number 77, which left Paris in the evening and arrived in Perpignan the following morning. Despite instructions urging the utmost caution and secrecy about the destination, French volunteers openly revealed where they were headed. This method of transportation was so well known that the train was commonly referred to as the "Volunteer Train" or the "Red Express." The French police did not intervene against these transports. In Perpignan, the volunteers transferred to prepared buses, which took them to Figueres, a border town in the province of Girona in northeastern Catalonia. There were no complications at the border between Spain and France, as customs officers were unwilling to check those arriving, many of whom directly sympathized with the Republican cause.

In Figueres, the volunteers waited in an old military fort for their transfer to the International Brigade centre in Albacete.

== In Spain ==
Upon arriving at the International Brigades' headquarters in Albacete, Jozef Májek was assigned as an infantryman to the Thälmann Battalion.

The Thälmann Battalion was multinational in composition, with the majority of volunteers being of German origin, though they did not make up even half of the unit. The battalion included volunteers from Poland, Hungary, Slovakia, England, Bulgaria, and the nations of the former Yugoslavia, as well as medical personnel from France and Belgium.

The rifle company was mainly composed of volunteers from Germany and England, while the second rifle company consisted of Polish volunteers. The final rifle company was made up of volunteers from the Yugoslav nations, including Bulgarians, Hungarians, and Slovaks. The Thälmann Battalion also had a machine gun company, which included Jozef Májek and Ladislav Holdoš.

The formation of the International Brigades was complicated, especially in the beginning, due to significant issues with military equipment and supplies.

The International Brigade was urgently sent to assist the besieged Madrid. On 11 November, the 12th International Brigade traveled by train to Villacanas, but it could not proceed further by train because Aranjuez was under the control of the Frankists (according to General Franco, who later became their leader during the war).

During the journey, some soldiers were learning how to handle weapons for the first time. In Villacanas, trucks were sent to transport the brigade closer to Madrid. However, the brigade was eventually transported by truck to La Mañarosa and the hilltop of Cerro de los Ángeles, where an old monastery fort was located.

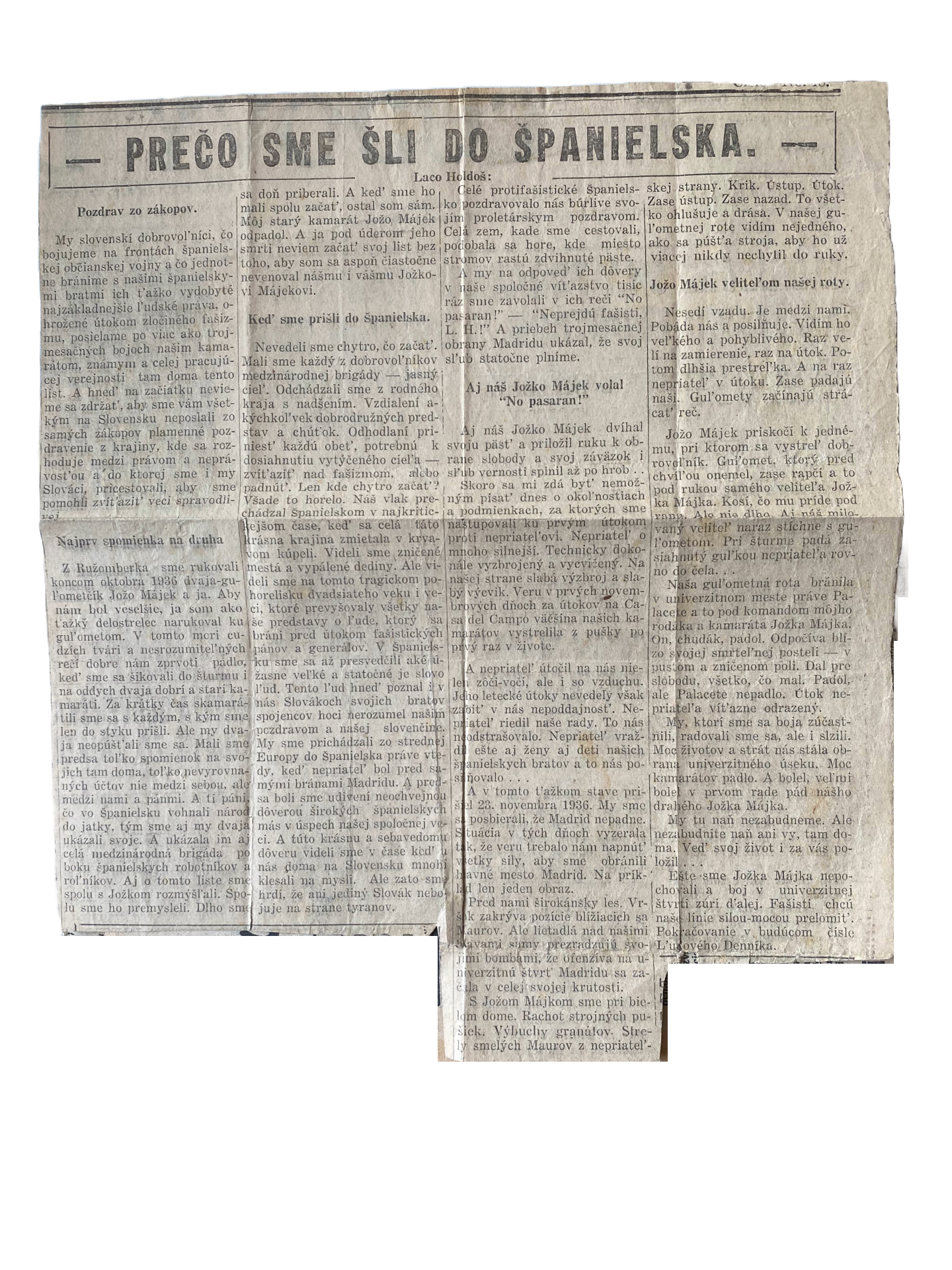
Jozef Májek's Final Hours were described by his fellow soldier Ladislav Holdoš.

Ladislav Holdoš recalls the battles at Cerro de los Ángeles: “Jozef Májek took command of the company. The first attack on the fascist positions. We drive them into retreat. By evening, the company, well-led and almost without losses, reaches 200 meters from the strong walls of the old monastery on Angel Hill. Due to insufficient weaponry, we cannot climb the walls. We only shoot with rifles and machine guns. During the night, Jožko Májek receives orders to retreat. He organizes it flawlessly. The fascists simultaneously make a sortie, and amidst the crackling of gunfire, the moans and cries of the wounded are heard. Jozef himself, crawling on all fours, leads the medical soldiers to these positions and saves the wounded from the adjacent company. After midnight, the last men leave the positions.”

The operation against Cerro de los Ángeles achieved its diversionary goal, successfully threatening the flank of the Frankist regiments attacking Madrid, thus alleviating the pressure on the rebel forces directly attacking the capital.

According to the plans, the 12th International Brigade was to move into an offensive towards Casa de Velázquez. However, plans changed, and the brigade instead maneuvered around Madrid from the north, reaching the edge of the university district and the western park, where they were to replace the exhausted units of the 11th International Brigade.

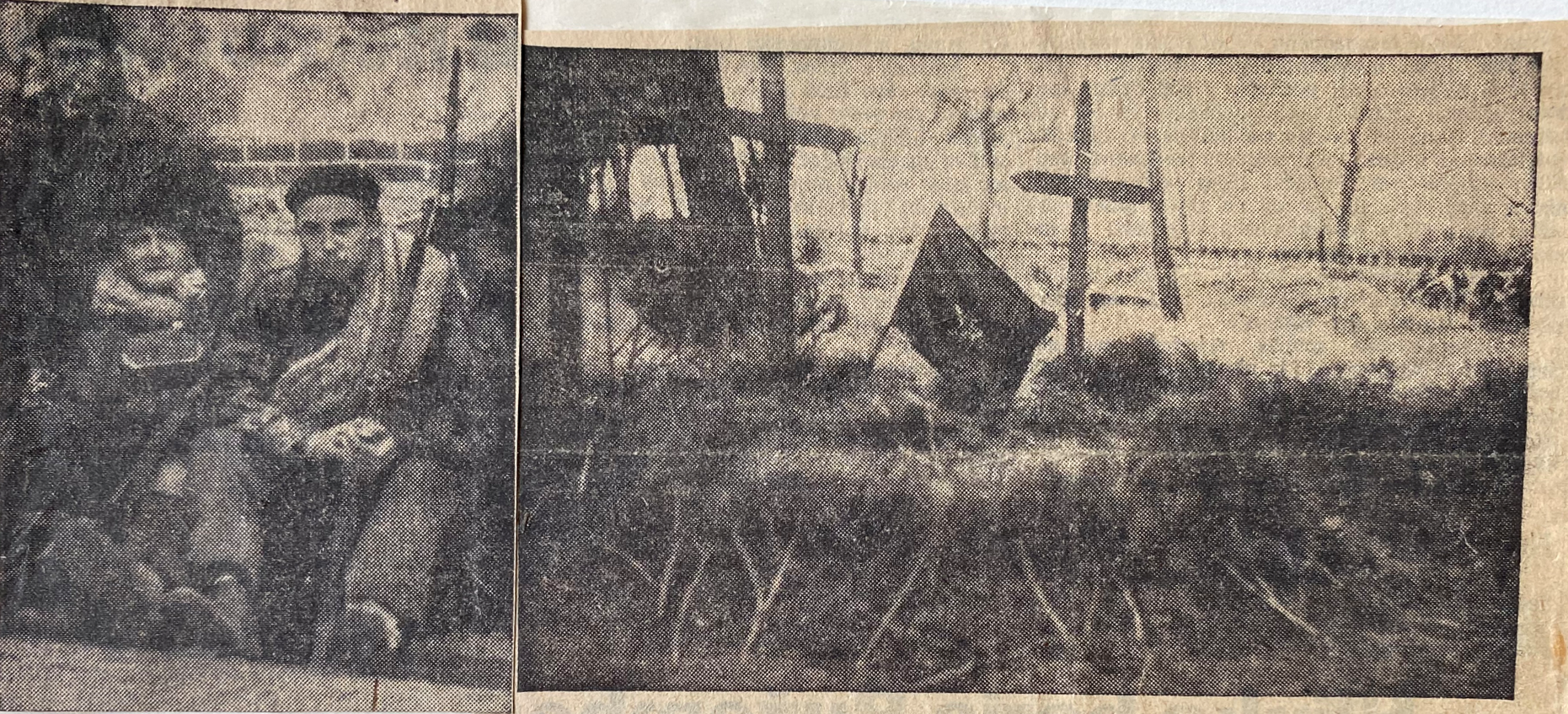
The last known photography of Jozef Májek and the crosses marking the graves of the German Kaupe, Slovak Májek, and Austrian Mager.

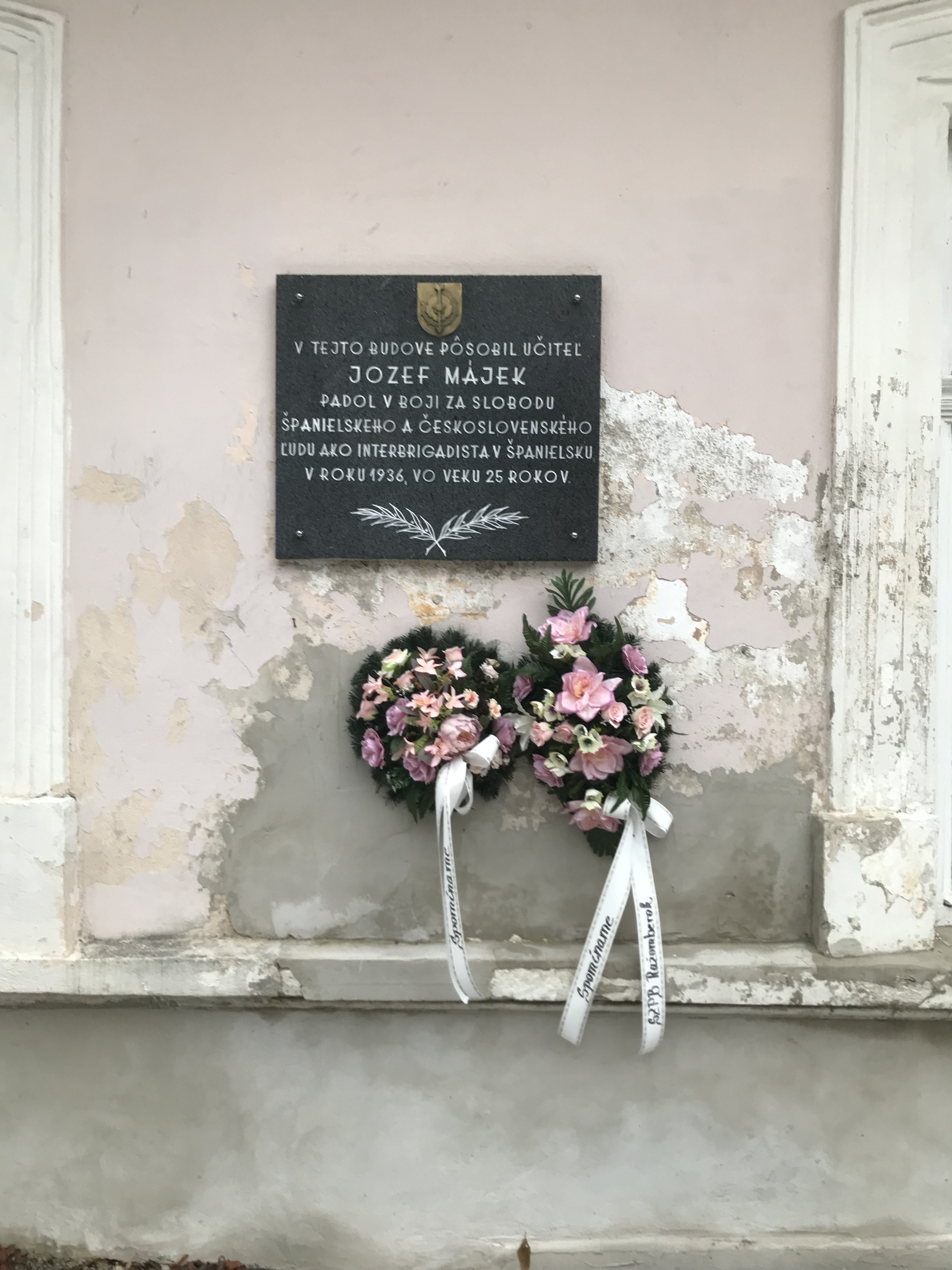
Memorial Plaque in Vlkolínec

After the attacks on 15 and 16 November, the Frankist forces succeeded in capturing Casa de Campo and advancing into the university district. The 11th International Brigade, under the command of Edgar André, resisted in the university area.

Volunteers from the 12th International Brigade arrived at this section of the front on 18 November. They managed to take the heights of Campo del Polo, Buena Vista, and Fuente de la Reina. On the night of 19 November, the 12th International Brigade advanced within a few hundred meters of the battle line. Their task was to capture the Palacete area, especially the section near the so-called White and Red Houses. Czechoslovak interbrigadists recall the fighting around the White House: “Friend Májek, the only one among us with officer training in reserve, performed his role excellently. He managed to advance the machine guns to 25 to 30 meters from the White House.” After initial success, when German and Italian International Brigade units captured several buildings, including the White House, enemy artillery responded with massive fire, and the captured buildings were soon engulfed in flames. After a counterattack by Frankist forces, the International Brigade risked being surrounded. The 12th International Brigade was forced to retreat from their captured positions.

Another attack was launched by the 12th International Brigade on 21 November. The attack began at 10:45 a.m., and the brigade managed to capture buildings on the left side of the Palacete, but the attack on the White House was unsuccessful. After losing the White House, Jozef Májek, along with several other friends, volunteered for a nighttime mission, where he succeeded in saving several wounded friends and valuable tank ammunition from Odessa. His selflessness is also mentioned in one of the first bulletins from the Thälmann Battalion.

On the following day, the 12th International Brigade began fortifying its positions, digging defensive trenches, shelters, and communication trenches. That day, General Lukacs issued orders for a new attack on the Palacete buildings on 23 November. The attack was scheduled for 7:00 a.m., supported by three tanks. However, the attack was delayed and started at 8:30 a.m. At the Palacete gate, the first tank was hit and caught fire, blocking the way for the other tanks. The next tank was disabled due to a malfunction during reloading. The last tank withdrew after taking several hits. A subsequent attack was scheduled for 4:45 p.m., but despite high casualties, it was unsuccessful. After the failed attack by the International Brigades on 23 November, the Frankist forces launched a counterattack. During the counterattack, Slovak interbrigadist Jozef Májek fell.

Artur G. London, in his book "Spain, Spain", described the defense of the university area in Madrid as follows:

"November 23. On the orders of General Lukacs, the Thälmann Battalion was to retake the White House, lost the day before. Májek, as company commander, was overseeing the machine gun support for the infantry assault. When the machine gun on the right wing of the Palacete line went silent because the shooter Julius Kaupe and the rest of the crew had fallen, Májek rushed to it and took position. But the Maxim gun never fired again.

At night, their bodies were carried away by their friends, and the German Kaupe and Slovak Májek were buried alongside the Austrian Mager, who had fallen two days earlier. They were buried near the viaduct on the Madrid-Palacete railway, ... In this old Castilian land, the German, Slovak, and Austrian lay next to each other, far from their homelands and families, having fallen for the same cause as so many brave sons of Spain."

Since the beginning of 1937, the 2nd Artillery Battery was named in his honor: “Jožko Májek”.

== Legacy ==
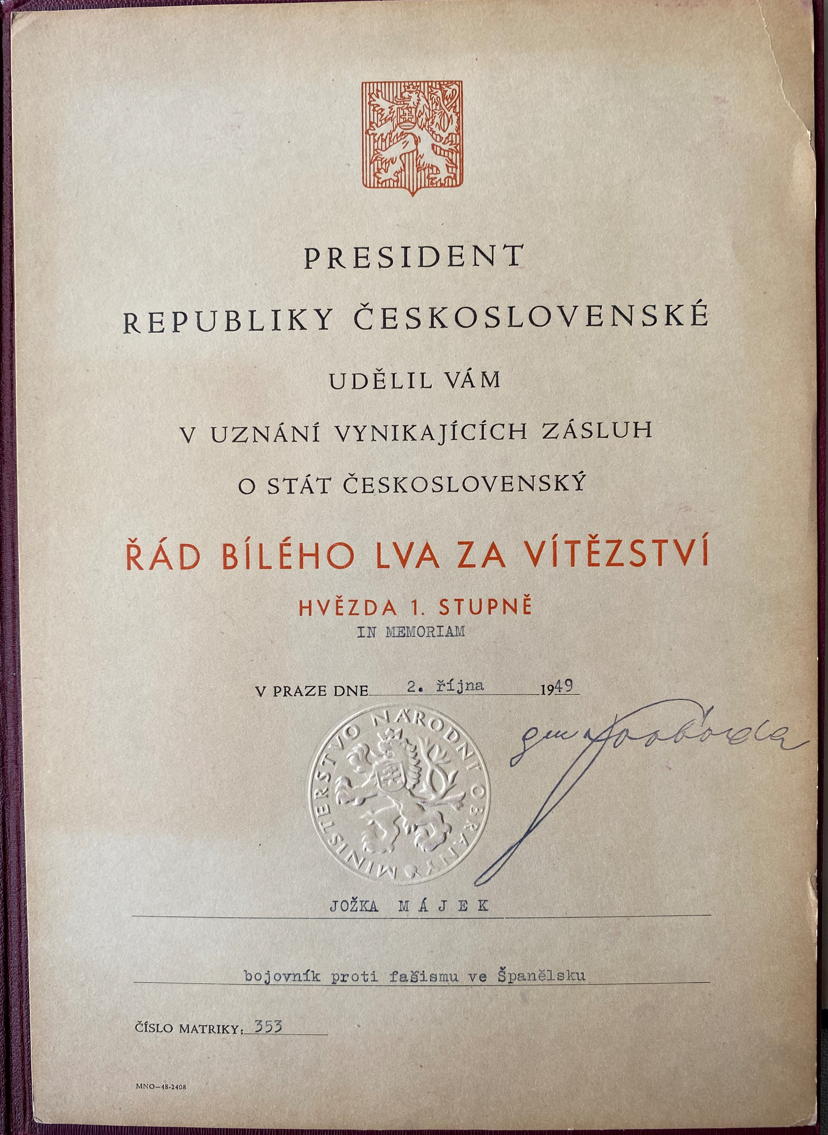
Jozef Májek – Order of the White Lion

Jozef Májek became a symbol of the antifascist fighters in Spain. A poem titled "Májkovská" by Ján Poničan, dedicated to his memory, was published in the Slovenské zvesti newspaper. The writer, poet, and publicist Ladislav Novomestský also wrote a poem, "Španielska krajina", which was likewise dedicated to Jozef Májek. In the German magazine Volks-Illustrierte, published under the leadership of Erwin Kubicek, a photomontage was printed that became a symbol of the struggle of international volunteers. It represented the fact that the defense of Republican Spain was not solely the work of communists. This montage, created by the renowned German artist John Heartfield, symbolized four interbrigadists: the German communist Hans Beimler, Belgian social democrat Brecht, Spanish anarchist Buenaventura Durruti, and Jozef Májek, who represented antifascist Catholics.

Jozef Májek was posthumously awarded the Order of the White Lion, 1st class, by the President of Czechoslovakia for his fight against fascism and his outstanding contributions to the Czechoslovak state. It was the highest state decoration. According to the law, this order was to be awarded only by the president, who could also authorize the prime minister or the commander-in-chief of the army for this purpose. In the photograph, there is a decree signed by General Ludvík Svoboda.

After World War II, a memorial plaque was unveiled in Ružomberok at the Liptov Museum in honor of Jozef Májek. In 1974, a tourist hut named after him was built on Malinô Brdo hill in the Great Fatra Mountains, which still bears his name today. Another plaque honoring the fallen interbrigadist was placed at the school building in Vlkolínec, which now serves as the Gallery of Folk Art. In Bratislava, a street in the Old Town was named Májkova Street in his honor.
