= Manifesto of the Seven =

The Manifesto of the Seven (Czech: Manifest sedmi) was a protest by seven artists against the Bolshevization of the Communist Party of Czechoslovakia (KSČ), after its 5th Congress in 1929. The text was written on the initiative of Ivan Olbracht and was published as a leaflet entitled Communist writers to communist workers. It called for the removal of the new Gottwaldova party leadership, which, in the opinion of the signatories, threatened the mass character and ability to act of the Communist Party.

== History ==
In 1921, the Communist Party of Czechoslovakia (KSČ) was founded. In 1925, the party decided to carry out a process of Bolshevization, it wanted to leave the course that had been relatively libertarian up to that point and to instead adopt the politics of the Comintern. The change of course was sealed by the election of Klement Gottwald as party leader at the 5th party congress in February 1929. Among other things, the primacy of politics in art was to be enforced in the future.

Initiated by Ivan Olbracht, seven artists published the Manifesto of the Seven, first as a leaflet with addressed Spisovatelé komunisté komunistickým dělníkům (Communist writers to communist workers). In this manifesto they expressed their fear that the planned strict orientation towards Moscow would jeopardize the party's mass character to date and, as a result, its ability to act in favor of a “faction hazard”; this is, according to the manifesto, "a suicidal policy" based on the mistakes of one's own comrades.

The seven signing authors, poets and literary critics were:

- Ivan Olbracht
- Helena Malířová (partner of Ivan Olbracht)
- Stanislav Kostka Neumann
- Josef Hora
- Jaroslav Seifert
- Marie Majerová
- Vladislav Vančura

This declaration was immediately sharply condemned by the party leadership, and the signatories were expelled from the party in March 1929. Furthermore, they were also criticized by other artists who maintained their loyalty to the leadership. Zásadní stanovisko k projevu sedmi (Basic Declaration on the Manifesto of Seven) was signed by Karel Teige, Konstantin Biebl, Vítězslav Nezval, Vilém Závada, František Halas, Karel Konrád, Jiří Weil, Julius Fučík, Bedřich Václavek, Vladimír Clementis, Laco Novomeský and Vojtech Tittelbach. However, Konstantin Biebl and Vilém Závada were signed in this document without their own knowledge, and some of them (like Clementis and Novomeský) fell victim to a Stalinist purge, after the establishment of the Fourth Czechoslovak Republic in 1948.
