= Laco Novomeský =

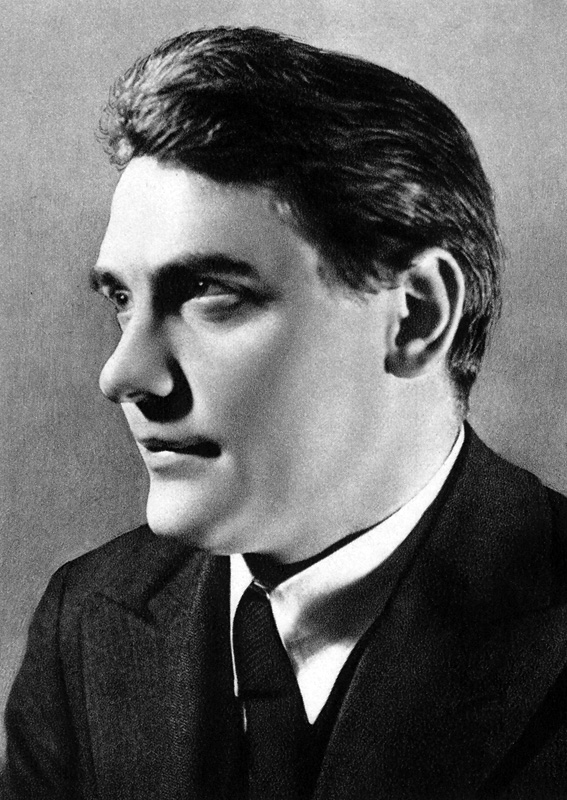
Laco Novomeský in 1937

Laco Novomeský (full name: Ladislav Novomeský) (27 December 1904, Budapest – 4 September 1976, Bratislava) was a Slovak poet, writer and communist politician. Novomeský was a member of the DAV group; after World War II he was the commissioner of education and culture of the Czechoslovak Socialist Republic. A prominent Czechoslovak politician, he was persecuted in the 1950s and later rehabilitated in the 1960s.

== Early life ==
Novomeský was born in to the family of a tailor that immigrated from Senica to Budapest, where he was born. The family moved back to Senica to continue his studies. He later graduated from the teacher training institute in Modra. Novomeský started to work as a teacher while at the same time enrolling as an external student of the Faculty of Arts at the Comenius University where he became involved in literary and political activities.

== Literary and political career ==
He joined the Communist Party of Czechoslovakia in 1925 and worked for its press. He was the editor of the Communist Party's newspaper Pravda (previously it was named the Truth of Poverty).

In 1927 he was arrested by the Czechoslovak authorities for press offence and sentenced to 10 years in prison however he was released by bail.

He went to Prague and joined the group of left-wing intellectuals around the DAV magazine.

The members of DAV also had influence in the Youth Club (sk. Klub mladých), which joined to the Art discussion club of Slovakia (sk. Umelecká beseda), which together with the DAV organized book-reading parties with poetry of important Slovak writers like Lukáč, Smrek, Novomeský and Okáli. DAV supported internationalism on the one hand, and too equality between Slovaks and Czechs. The concept of DAV connected the political line on the one hand, and the aesthetic line on the other hand. After the ban on the DAV project (by representatives of the new Slovak state), individual members (Urx, Novomeský, Sirácky, Husák, Clementis) participated in the organization of the Slovak National Uprising 1944 (Eduard Urx was even executed by the Nazis; Gustav Husak was one of the most important organizers of the Slovak National Uprising 1944). Ex-DAV members, Husák, Okáli, Clementis and Novomeský became part of the government in exile (in London) and after the end of the war they took part in taking power.

Novomeský rejected the Manifesto of the Seven and supported Klement Gottwald and the Sovietisation of the Communist Party of Czechoslovakia. He wrote against the seven left-wing intellectuals and called for the intellectual left to support the new Party line by saying "The intellectual left cannot stand above the party".

In 1936, the Spanish Civil War broke out against general Franco's insurgency, in which Novomeský became involved in Czechoslovakia by organizing International Brigades (he also founded the Club of Friends of Spain). A year later, he participated in the congress in Paris and became a direct participant in the fighting (he got directly to the Czechoslovak combat units fighting the fascists) and the congress of the International Association of Writers for the Defense of Culture in Valencia, Barcelona and Madrid. Many of his memoirs about the Civil War were later published.

In 1939 he moved back to Slovakia and continued his communist activities despite the ban of the Party. In August 1943, together with his younger friend Gustav Husák, he became a member of the 5th illegal leadership of the Communist Party of Slovakia, led by Karol Šmidke. He was one of the leading organizers of the Slovak National uprising. He was also a co-founder and vice-chairman of the insurgent Slovak National Council in 1943 which later became the highest legislative and executive body in socialist Slovakia.

Since the 1920s, Novomeský personally knew Alexander Mach, a prominent politician of Hlinka's Slovak People's Party who later became the commander of the Hlinka Guard and the Minister of Interior of the Slovak Republic. During Mach's time in office, Novomeský repeatedly lobbied him in favor of Communist prisoners.

== In the Czechoslovak Socialist Republic ==
After the war he became a member of the Central committee of the Communist Party of Czechoslovakia and the Commissioner of Education from 1945 to 1950 as well as a member of the Constituent National Assembly.

At the congress of the Communist Party of Slovakia in 1950, he was accused of 'bourgeois nationalism' and was arrested on 6 February 1951, together with Gustav Husák. In 1954 he was sentenced to 10 years in prison in a staged trial with a subversive group of bourgeois nationalists. While Gustáv Husák was not completely broken in custody and tried to oppose the investigators, Novomeský and other accusers cooperated with the security forces and confessed to all the fabricated points. He could not publish at this time. In prison, he wrote 4,000 poems on tobacco papers, but smoked most of them. On 22 December 1955 he was released on parole. Zolo Mikeš wrote (Aktuality.sk) Novomeský's statements were used in the Slánsky trial against his friend Vladimir Clementis, thus contributing to his death sentence.

Novomeský then lived in Prague and was not allowed to return to Bratislava and was under police supervision. Then, until 1962, he worked at the Monument of National Literature in Prague. In 1963, Novomeský was fully rehabilitated. He moved to Bratislava, where he worked at the Institute of Slovak Literature of the Slovak Academy of Sciences. After the Warsaw Pact invasion on 21 August 1968, he again became a member of the Central Committee of the Communist Party of Czechoslovakia, and in the same year he also chaired the Matica slovenská. In 1970, he resigned from the Central Committee of the Party and soon became seriously ill. In July 1970, a stroke completely removed him from social life. Opinions therefore differ as to whether, at least initially, he contributed to the so-called Husák's "normalization" In the cultural and political field.

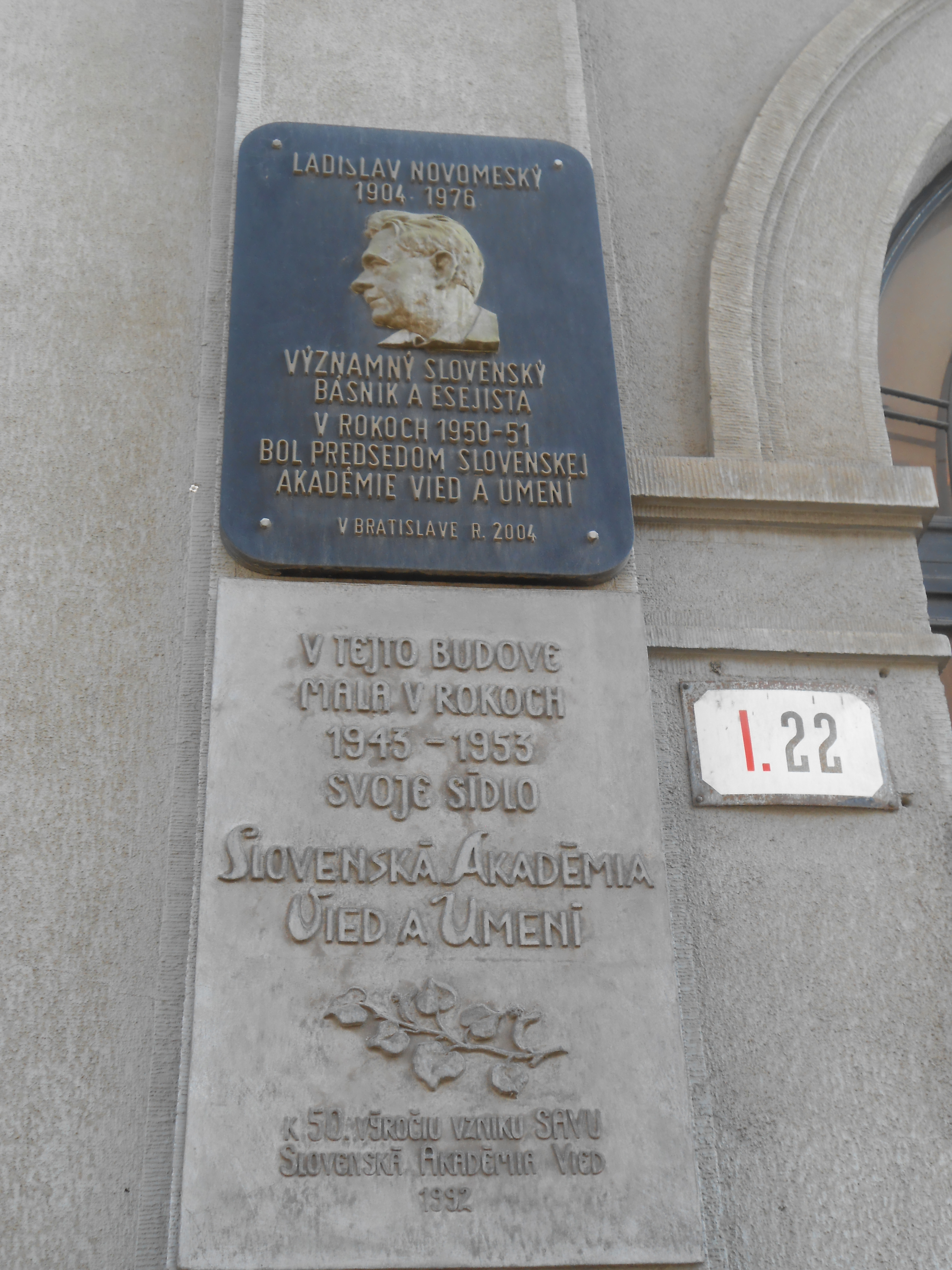
Commemorative plaque of the Slovak Academy of Sciences and Arts on the Comenius University building in Bratislava

He died on 4 September 1976 in Bratislava.

== Works ==
=== Poetry ===
- 1927 – Nedeľa
- 1932 – Romboid
- 1939 – Svätý za dedinou
- 1935 – Otvorené okná
- 1949 – Pašovanou ceruzkou
- 1963 – Vila Tereza, poéma
- 1963 – Do mesta 30 minút
- 1964 – Stamodtiaľ a iné
- 1964 – Nezbadaný svet
- 1966 – Dom, kde žijem

=== Journalism and essays ===
- 1933 – Marx a slovenský národ
- 1949 – Výchova socialistického pokolenia
- 1969 – Znejúce ozveny
- 1969 – Čestná povinnosť
- 1970 – Manifesty a protesty
- 1970 – Slávnosť istoty
- 1972 – Zväzky a záväzky
- 1971 – O Hviezdoslavovi
- 1971 – O literatúre
- 1974 – Nový duch novej školy
