= Peter Jilemnický =

Slovak writer and politician

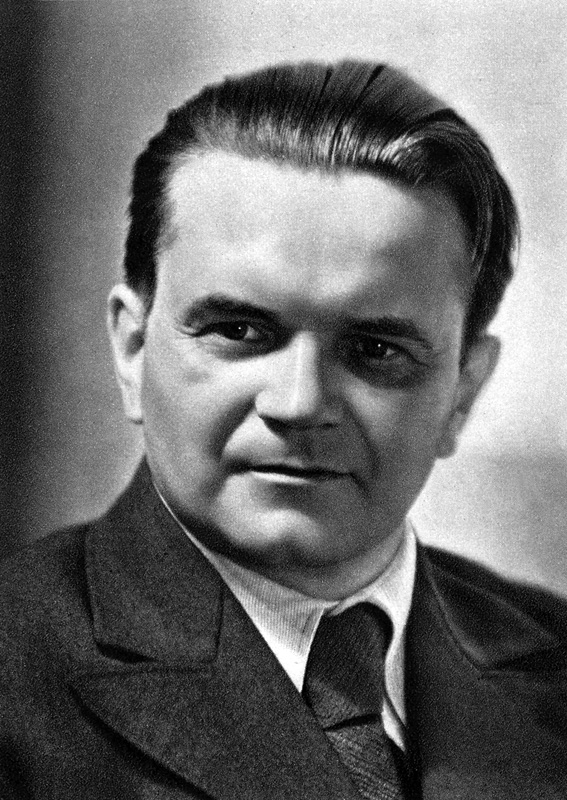
- Jilemnický in 1937
- Born: 18 March 1901; Kyšperk, Austria-Hungary
- Died: 19 March 1949 (aged 48); Moscow, Soviet Union
- Occupations: Writer, poet, diplomat, educator
- Spouse: Růžena Jilemnická
- Writing career
- Notable awards: National Artist
- Literary movement: Socialist realism

Peter Jilemnický (pseudonyms: Al Arm, Peter Malý, Peter Hron) (March 18, 1901 – May 19, 1949) was a Slovak writer, journalist, educator and Communist politician of Czech origin.

== Biography ==
Jilemincký was born in Kyšperk (today Letohrad), in Eastern Bohemia. His father was a train conductor and he had two siblings. He received his education at a primary school in Kyšperk and Červená Voda, then continued at the Secondary Agricultural School in Chrudim, but graduated from the Teacher Training Institute in Levice in southern Slovakia. After graduating, he worked as a teacher in Slovakia.

In 1922 he joined the Communist Party of Czechoslovakia and in 1926 he travelled to the Soviet Union where he worked as a teacher in the Interhelpo. In 1927 he was accepted into the Soviet All-Union Communist Party and studied at the Moscow State Institute of Journalism. In 1928 he returned to the Czechoslovak Republic and until 1929 he worked together with Eduard Urx in Moravská Ostrava in the editorial office of Pravda, the central body of the Communist Party of Slovakia.

From 1936 he was a teacher in the town of Svätý Jur near Bratislava, in 1939 he moved to Bohemia to the village of Poříčí near Litomyšl, and taught at various village schools.

During the German occupation, Jilemnický took part in the anti-fascist struggle. He was a member of an illegal communist resistance organization in Eastern Bohemia. Jilemnický's brother was executed in November 1941. On October 27, 1942, he was investigated by the Gestapo in Poříčí and arrested the next day during an interrogation in Pardubice. He was imprisoned in Pardubice for eight months and in mid-June 1943 he was transferred to the Terezín Small Fortress. He was subsequently transferred to the Litoměřice Prison and sentenced to eight years in prison in October. He spent prison in the Griebo labor camp near the town of Coswig near Dessau in Saxony-Anhalt At the end of April 1945, he managed to leave the camp under the name of a Polish prisoner who died there. He returned to Poříčí on May 25, 1945.

After the liberation he was elected a member of the Interim National Assembly for the Communist Party of Slovakia. In 1945, as a senior official in the Board of Trustees, he became the head of the Department for Children and Youth under Commission of Education and Awareness. In 1947 he was appointed permanent delegate of the All-Slavic Committee in Belgrade and in 1948 he became the cultural attaché of the Czechoslovak Embassy in Moscow, where he died on May 19, 1949.

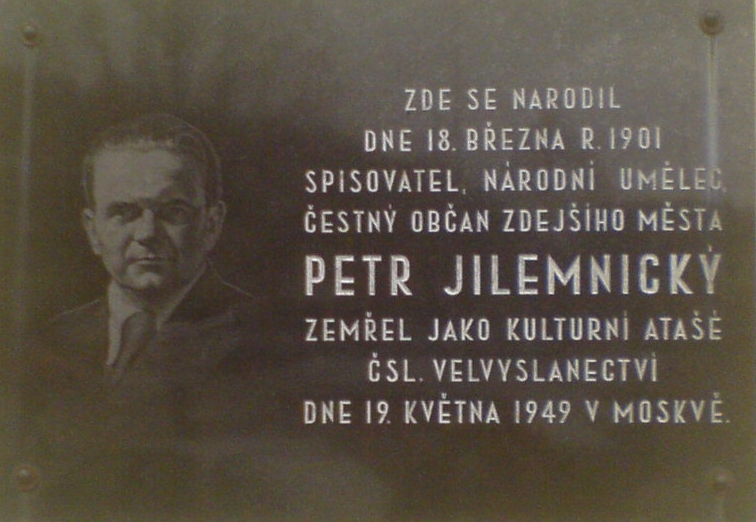
Memorial plaque for Peter Jilemnický at his birthplace in Letohrad

He was posthumously awarded the order of National Artist. Several schools and dozens of streets were named after him. In 1954, his second wife opened a museum dedicated to his life and works in his former villa.

== Works ==
Jile began his literary work during his high school studies in 1919. He began writing poetry as well as prose and published his works in the magazine Mladé proudy. In his early works you can observe elements of Expressionism, however he later adopted the style of Socialist realism, but also poetry and descriptions of natural beauties. Much of his work remained in manuscript form. He published in left-wing magazines such as Proletárka, Hlas ľudu, Pravda chudoby, Pravda and DAV.

- 1921 – Devadesátdevět koní bílých, prozaická prvotina
- 1924 – 1925 – Červená sedma, výber z prozaickej tvorby z týchto rokov zhrnutý do tejto zbierky (poviedky: Vražda v aeropláne A-71, Život po smrti, Zakryté karty)
- 1925 – Štrajk, proletárska dráma
- 1929 – Víťazný pád, románová prvotina
- 1929 – Dva roky v kraji Sovietov
- 1930 – Zuniaci krok
- 1932 – Pole neorané
- 1934 – Kus cukru
- 1937 – Kompas v nás
- 1938 – Návrat
- 1947 – Kronika
- 1947 – Cesta
- 1951 – Prečo som sa stal komunistom
- 1955 – Tri rozprávky, próza pre deti
- Pěšinky, zbierka (rukopis)
- Oheň majáků, cyklus (rukopis)
