= Dav (magazine) =

Defunct cultural and political magazine (1924–1937)

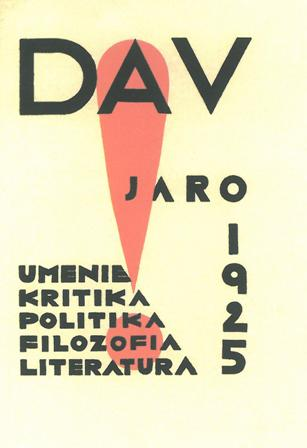
- Cover of an issue from 1925
- Categories: Literary
- Publisher: Davisti
- First issue: 1924
- Final issue: 1937
- Language: Slovak

Dav (based on the initials of the first names of Daniel Okáli, Andrej Sirácky, and Vladimír Clementis) was a leftist magazine published between 1924 and 1937 with intervals in Prague and then in Bratislava by the group Davisti. The magazine featured illustrations by Frans Masereel, George Grosz, Marc Chagall, and others. It had a Marxist (and later members Titoist) stance. A reprint edition came out in 1965.

DAV included important Slovak writers, poets and cultural workers, scientists and philosophers, politicians and lawyers, literary critics and graphic designers, and visual artists. The concept of DAV magazine connected the political line on the one hand, and the avant-garde aesthetic line on the other hand. DAV supported internationalism on the one hand, and too equality between Slovaks and Czechs (in the first period they stood in radical opposition to conservatism; later they found their own concept of national continuity with the social progressive movements of the past). DAV actively reflected on the tragic events in Košúty (May 1931), where protesters were shot and killed during a workers' strike. DAV dedicated to this event a whole issue and organized the Manifesto of Slovak Writers (also signed by Emil Boleslav Lukáč, Jozef Gregor-Tajovský, Milo Urban, Ján Smrek, and Gejza Vámoš). Clementis wrote letters to important writers like Romain Rolland and Maxim Gorky). DAV members also wrote about the conflicts in Polomka or about the killing of a worker on the construction of the Červená Skala – Margecany railway.

DAV played an important role in shaping 1. philosophical and political ideas in Slovakia; 2. Slovak left-wing politics and 3. in establishing modernist tendencies in Slovak visual art and literature.

== Reflection ==
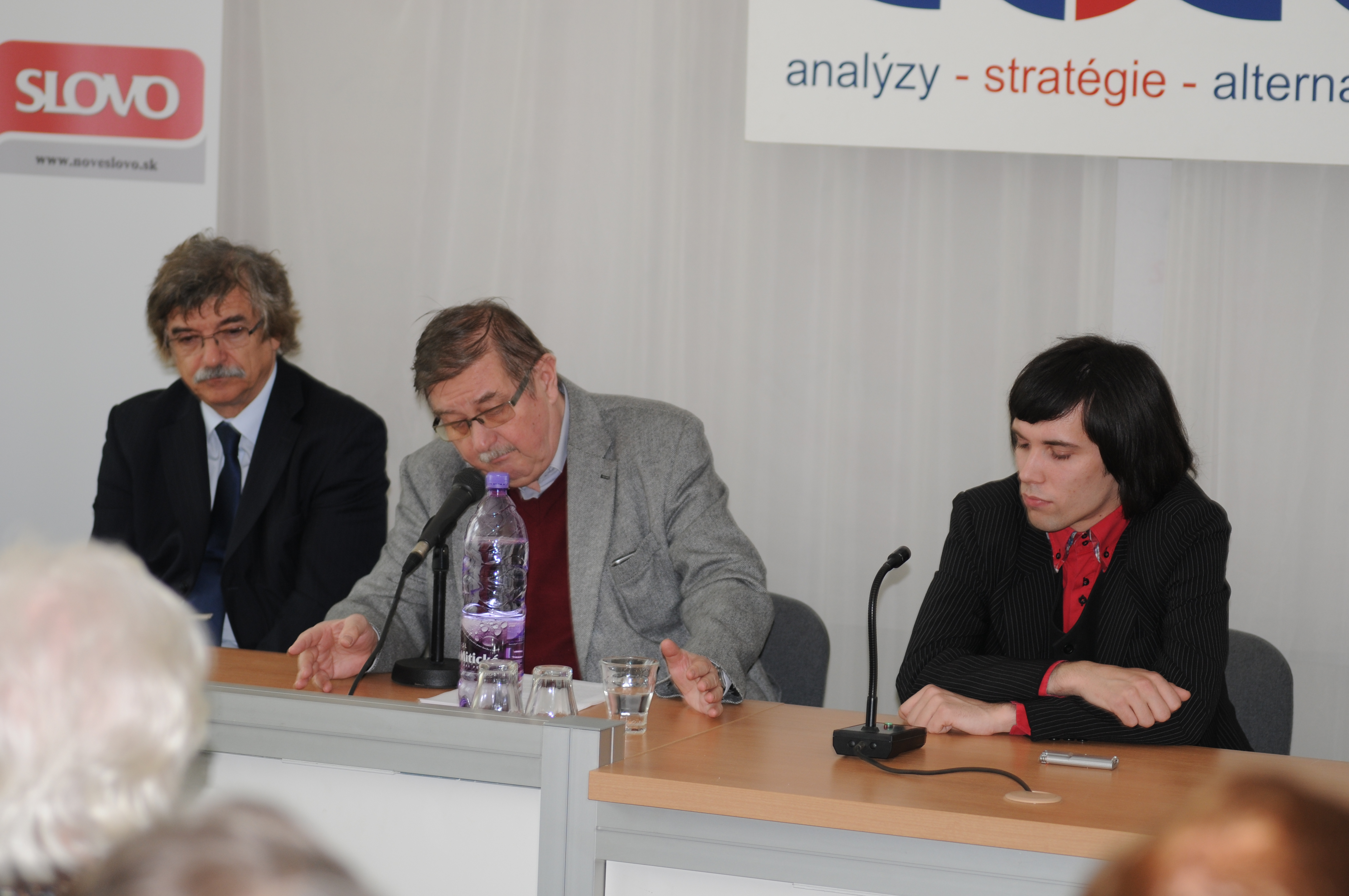
Conference for the 110th anniversary of the birth of Slovak poet and politician Ladislav Novomeský. Rector of Comenius University RNDr. Karol Mičieta, CSc., philosopher prof. PhDr. Dalimír Hajko, DrSc. and organizer Lukáš Perný

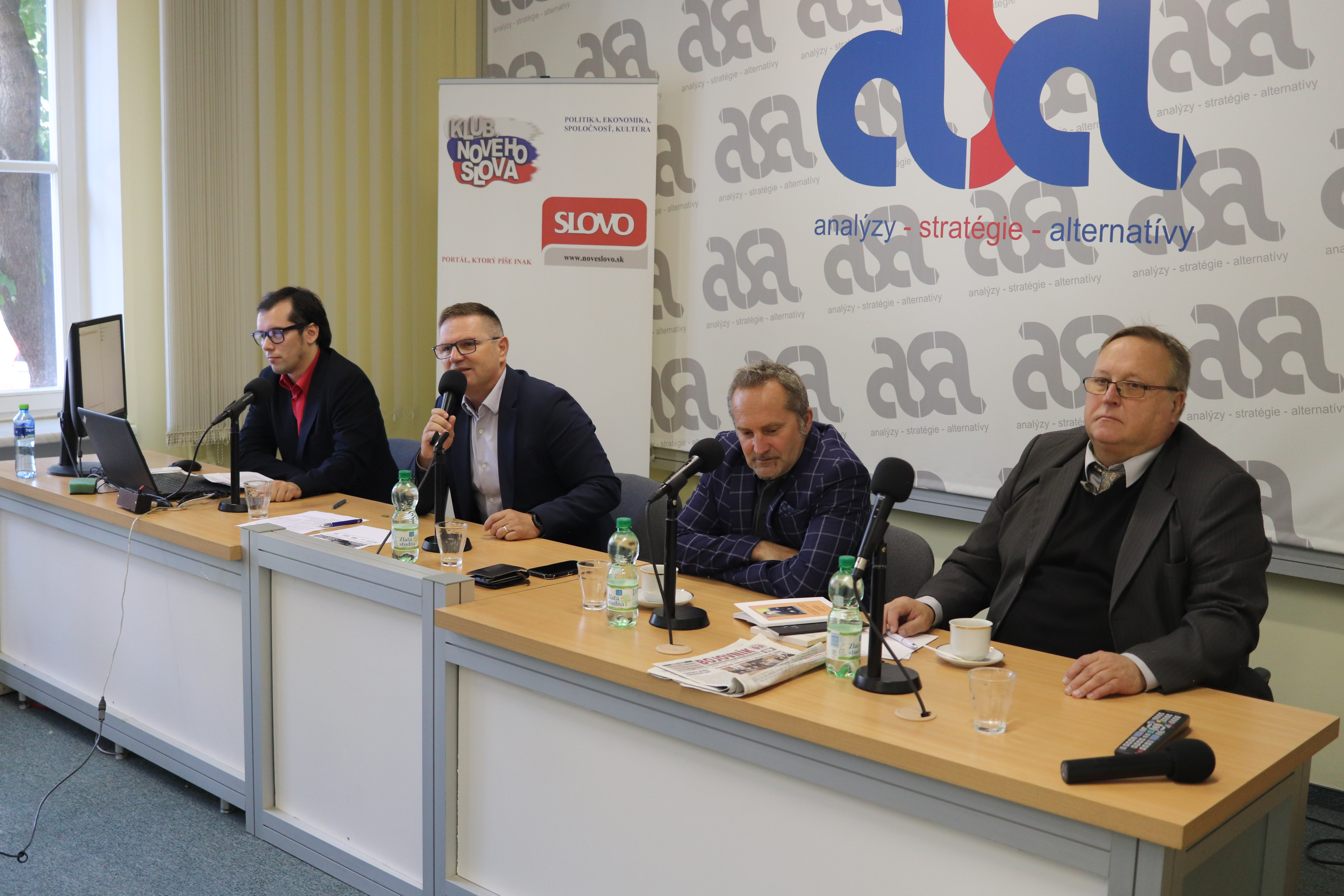
Conference on the 120th anniversary of Vladimír Clementis and the 100th anniversary of Vladimír Mináč (ASA, Nové Slovo, Slovak Matica, SZPB), October 2022

The creative reflection of the DAV intellectual group was devoted to authors who also participated in their rehabilitation in the 1960s. From the historical-political point of view it was mainly Viliam Plevza and Štefan Drug and from more the aesthetic, culturological and literary point of view Karol Rosenbaum.

In the 21st century, M. Habaj, K. Csiba, P. Kerecman, D. Hajko, J. Lysý, J. Leikert, L. Perný, M. Krno, M. Gešper, E. Chmelár, J. Migašová, J. Baer and others devoted their texts to the reflection of DAV. In 1992, the last collection of Ladislav Novomeský's texts from 1960s entitled "Repayment of the Great Debt" was published in the V. Clementis Foundation. In 2015, L. Perný organized a conference for the 110th anniversary of the birth of Ladislav Novomeský in Bratislava. In 2002, 2012 and 2022, three conferences about Vladimir Clementis were organized in Bratislava. In 2022, Matica slovenská and ASA Institute organized a conference for Vladimír Clementis (the 120th anniversary) and Vladimír Mináč (the 120th anniversary) and in 2023 for Daniel Okáli (the 120th anniversary).

== Aesthetic aspects ==
According to Lukáš Perný, the author of the cover of the DAV revue was Mikuláš Galanda (with the alias La Ganda), who, together with Ľ. Fulla created the artistic identity of the DAV revue. They collaborated with DAV members through books, posters, and bulletins; for example, Fulla illustrated a book by Ján Rob Poničan before the formation of the DAV and Galanda created drawings for Novomeský’s debut poetry book. The Revue also contains the first Slovak attempt at modernist typography, the equivalent of which can be found in the Czech avant-garde (Host, Pásmo).

According to Lukáš Perný, when discussing the aesthetic component (visual dimension of the DAV revue design), the international context that connects it must not be overlooked:

- 1. The influence between Prague and Slovakia-Bratislava; with Hungary (texts of avant-garde theorist and poet Lajos Kassák published in DAV) (The DAV was part of the manifestations of Slovak modernism, which was closely connected with Prague),
- 2. Feedback with French culture (paintings by Frans Masereel in the first issue of DAV; controversy with French poetry),
- 3. with Russian avantgarde (Okali's appeal to Mayakovsky in the DAV 1924; mentions of Mejerchold, Mayakovsky, Erenburg in DAV 1925/1),4. with German avantgarde (especially art of the New Objectivity – aesthetics of experience with urban culture in the form of satirical and social-critical images based on aestheticization of visuality of –bourgeois entertainment, nightlife, social periphery and poverty, prostitution, murders, political criticism (paintings by Otto Dix, Georg Grosz – published in DAV revue).

According to Lukáš Perný, D. Okáli’s text – with the motto "Not an artistic program! An artistic act!"–represents a pamphlet article of the DAV on social-revolutionary art. Ideologically, (D. Okáli) finds the function of art and culture in the revolutionary rebirth of society, a radical split with tradition (criticism of bourgeois ideology, clericalism, capitalism, and individualism), referring to Trotsky (art as a means of changing the economic establishment and helping to achieve political power). Collectivism of DAV — according to J. Migašová — is based on reflections on collective art by Lajos Kassák, and also under the influence of Jiří Wolker, Karel Teige (Teige redefined the concept of folk art) and early Devětstil.
