= Ján Poničan =

Slovak writer and poet

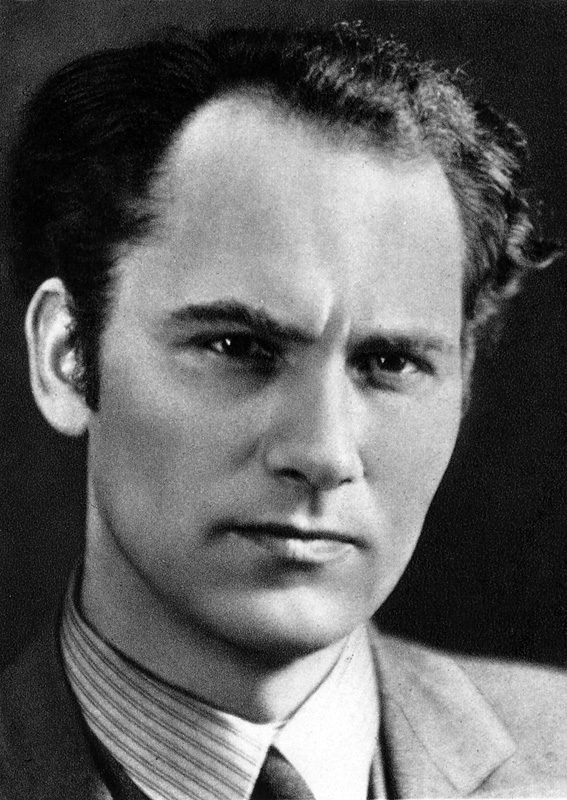
- Ján Poničan in December 1937
- Born: June 15, 1902; Očová, Austria-Hungary
- Died: February 25, 1978 (aged 75); Bratislava, Czechoslovakia
- Occupations: Poet, novelist, lawyer, playwright, translator
- Political party: Communist Party of Czechoslovakia
- Writing career
- Pen name: Ján Rob Poničan
- Language: Slovak
- Movement: Dav

Ján Poničan (pseudonym Ján Rob Poničan; June 15, 1902 – February 25, 1978) was a Slovak poet, novelist, lawyer, playwright and translator.

== Biography ==
Poničan was born in to a peasant family, his parents died when he was a child and Ján was raised by his relatives. He received his education in a Hungarian classical grammar school in Banská Bystrica and received his diploma in Lučenec. He later continued at the Technical University in Prague, but after two years he transferred to law, which he graduated from in 1927.

In 1924 he joined the Communist Party of Czechoslovakia and became a member of the Davisti, a group of left-wing intellectuals and was among the founders of the DAV magazine.

Poničan began to work in Bratislava as a trainee lawyer and gave lectures on the Soviet Union. He was the head of the International Red Aid delegation and visited Moscow and Siberia. After his return to Banská Bystrica he was convicted and imprisoned for illegal Communist activities.

The following year he was a practicing lawyer with Vladimír Clementis and a year later he opened his own law firm and represented mainly workers and communists. He practiced law until 1947, later he was secretary of the Bar Association, a public and state notary.

After 1945, he was the secretary and vice-president of the Association of Slovak Writers from 1958 to 1959, the head of the Hungarian editorial office of the Slovak Publishing House of Fine Literature, and later, until 1964, when he retired, he was the director of this publishing house.

== Works ==
In his poems he expressed his political opinions, revolutionary and proletarian enthusiasms, but also his personal restlessness, erotic and affective motives, impressions from urban environments and also social issues. He used the melody of images, the poetic search for rhymes. In addition to poetry, prose and theater, he translated playwrights of foreign literatures, such as the Russians Sergei Yesenin and Vladimir Mayakovsky, Hungarians Endre Ady and Sándor Petőfi, and also works of Bulgarian literature.

=== Poetry ===
- 1923 – Som, myslím, cítim a vidím, milujem všetko, len temno nenávidím 1929 – Demontáž
- 1932 – Večerné svetlá
- 1934 – Angara
- 1937 – Póly
- 1941 – Divný Janko
- 1942 – Sen na medzi
- 1946 – Ivan Klas
- 1946 – Povstanie
- 1947 – Mesto
- 1949 – Na tepne čias
- 1954 – Básne
- 1958 – Riava neutícha
- 1962 – Ohne nad riekou
- 1967 – Držím sa zeme, drží ma zem
- 1972 – Špirála ľúbosť
- 1973 – Hĺbky a diaľky

=== Prose ===
- 1935 – Stroje sa pohli
- 1945 – Sám
- 1945 – Pavučina
- 1945 – Hôrny kvet
- 1946 – Treba žiť
- 1949 – Z čias-nečias
- 1959 – Po horách-dolinách
- 1960 – A svet sa hýbe
- 1964 – Červená sedma
- 1973 – Jánošíkovci
- 1975 – Búrlivá mladosť
- 1979 – Dobyvateľ

=== Drama ===
- 1924 – Dva svety
- 1935 – Iskry bez ohňa
- 1936 – Bačov žart
- 1936 – Vzbura na rozkaz
- 1941 – Jánošík
- 1944 – Básnik a kráľ
- 1945 – Vzbura žien
- 1949 – Čistá hra
- 1958 – Štyria
- 1962 – Všetkostroj
- Máje

=== Children's literature ===
- 1953 – Deti, deti, pozrite
- 1979 – Skaza hradu
