= Očová =

Očová Nagyócsa
- Municipality
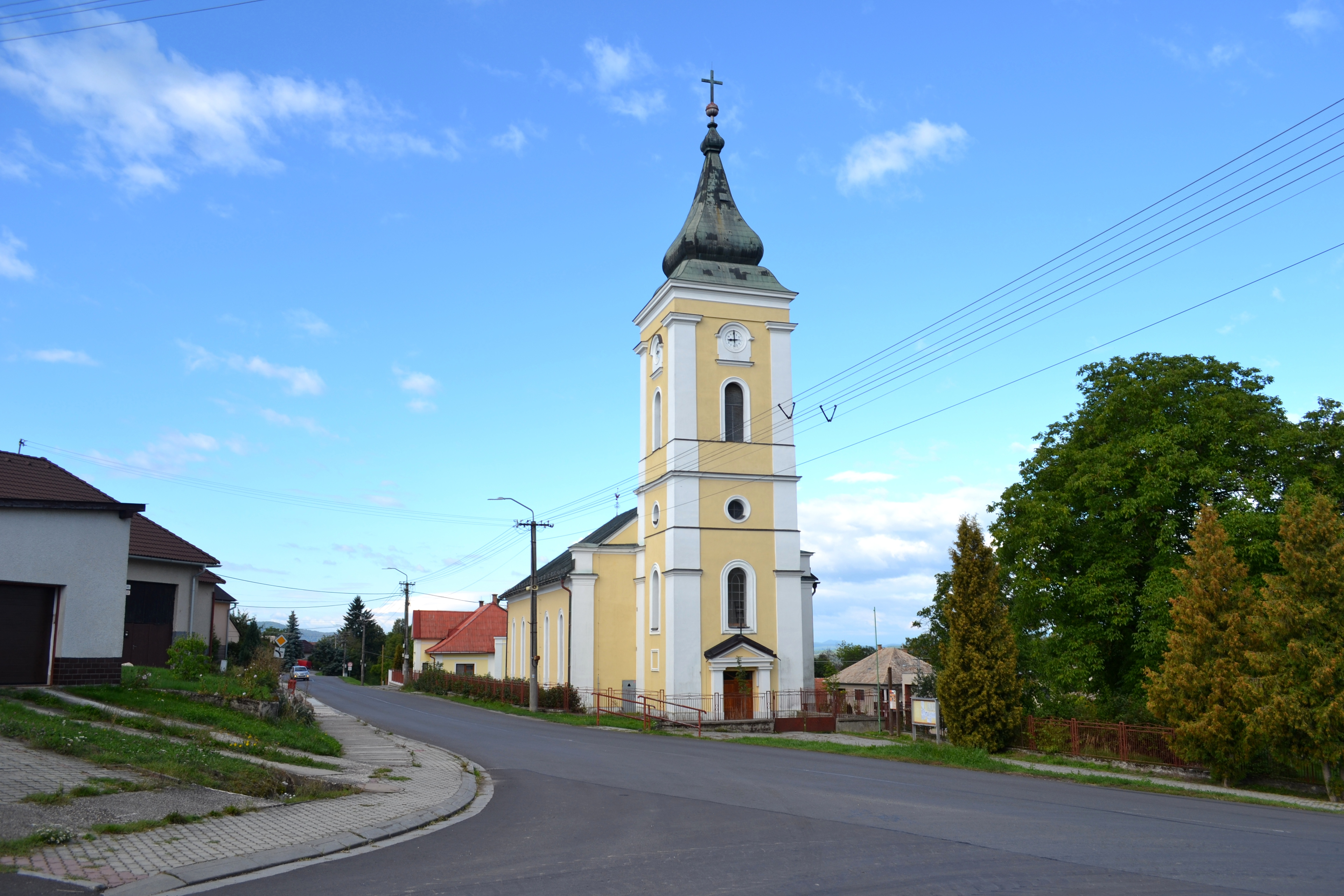

- Flag

- Location of Očová in the Banská Bystrica Region Location of Očová in Slovakia
- Coordinates: 48.60°N 19.29°E
- Country: Slovakia
- Region: Banská Bystrica Region
- District: Zvolen District
- First mentioned: 1406

Area
  - Total: 88.34 km^{2} (34.11 sq mi)
- Elevation: 394 m (1,293 ft)

Population (2025)
  - Total: 2,446
- Time zone: UTC+1 (CET)
  - Summer (DST): UTC+2 (CEST)
- Postal code: 962 23
- Area code: +421 45
- Vehicle registration plate (until 2022): ZV
- Website: www.ocova.sk

Očová (Hungarian: Nagyócsa, until 1899: Ocsova) is a village and municipality of the Zvolen District in the Banská Bystrica Region of Slovakia.

== Geography ==
The municipality lies at an altitude of 394 metres (1,293 ft) and covers an area of 88.34 km^{2} (34.11 sq mi) (2025).

== History ==
Before the establishment of independent Czechoslovakia in 1918, Očová was part of Zólyom County within the Kingdom of Hungary. From 1939 to 1945, it was part of the Slovak Republic.

== Official name ==
- 1773, 1873–1902 Ocsova, 1786 Ocschowa, 1808 Ocsova, Očowá, 1863 Ocsová, 1907–1913 Nagyócsa, 1920– Očová

== Population ==
Population statistic (10 years)
Year	1995	2005	2015	2025
Count	2596	2597	2604	2446
Difference		+0.03%	+0.26%	−6.06%

Population statistic
Year	2024	2025
Count	2451	2446
Difference		−0.20%

It has a population of 2446 people (31 December 2025).

=== Ethnicity ===
Census 2021 (1+ %)
Ethnicity	Number	Fraction
Slovak	2442	96.36%
Not found out	90	3.55%
Total	2534	

In year 2021 was 2534 people by ethnicity 2442 as Slovak, 90 as Not found out, 21 as Romani, 13 as Czech, 6 as Russian, 6 as Hungarian, 5 as Austrian, 5 as Other, 4 as Rusyn, 2 as Italian, 1 as Jewish and 1 as Polish.

Note on population: The difference values of population numbers in the table "Population statistic" and in the sections "Ethnicity" & "Religion" is caused by the use of various statistical methods.

=== Religion ===
Census 2021 (1+ %)
Religion	Number	Fraction
Roman Catholic Church	925	36.5%
None	744	29.36%
Evangelical Church	716	28.26%
Not found out	82	3.24%
Total	2534	

In year 2021 was 2534 people by religion 925 from Roman Catholic Church, 744 from None, 716 from Evangelical Church, 82 from Not found out, 17 from Greek Catholic Church, 12 from Other, 8 from Other and not ascertained christian church, 8 from Ad hoc movements, 6 from Christian Congregations in Slovakia, 4 from Buddhism, 3 from Jehovah's Witnesses, 3 from Baptists Church, 2 from Eastern Orthodox Church, 2 from Paganism and natural spirituality, 1 from Calvinist Church and 1 from United Methodist Church.

== Notable people ==
- Matej Bel (1684–1749), scholar and polymath
- Erzsébet Cseszneky, Hungarian noblewoman, benefactor of the Lutheran Church, Matej Bel's mother
- Rudolf Huliak (born 1975), politician
- Jozef Moravčík (born 1945), diplomat
- Ján Poničan (1902–1978), poet and novelist
