= Helena Malířová =

Czech writer, journalist and translator

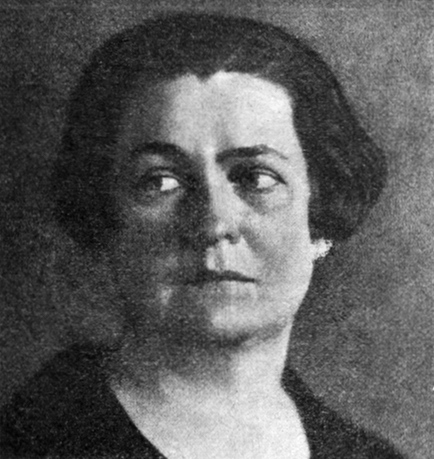
- Malirova in 1930
- Born: Helena Nosková; 31 October 1877; Prague, Kingdom of Bohemia, Austria-Hungary
- Died: 17 February 1940 (aged 62); Prague, Protectorate of Bohemia and Moravia
- Resting place: Strašnice Crematorium
- Occupations: Novelist, poet, journalist, translator, children's writer
- Partner: Ivan Olbracht
- Relatives: Růžena Nasková (sister)

Helena Malířová (née Nosková; 31 October 1877 – 17 February 1940) was a Czech writer, journalist and translator.

== Biography ==
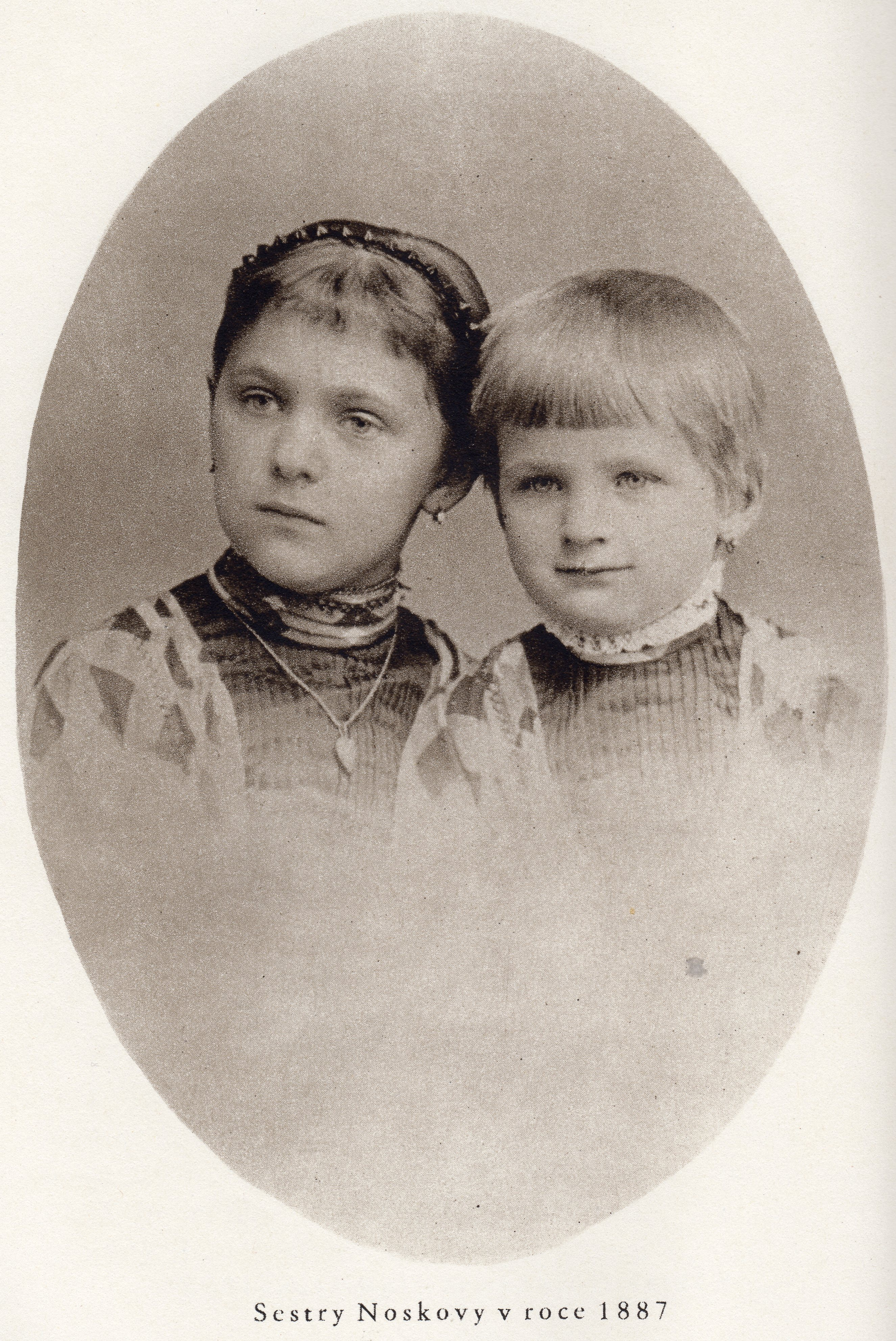
The Nosková sisters Helena and Růžena in 1887

Malířová was born in to the family of an accountant and state official. Her sister was the actress Růžena Nasková. In 1900 she began her career as a writer and met her future husband Jan Malíř whom she married in 1904; but their relationship did not last long because Malír died of tuberculosis in 1909. She volunteered as a nurse and reporter during the Serbian-Turkish War. She met her future partner, the writer Ivan Olbracht, in Vienna and under his influence joined the Social Democratic Party. In 1920 she took part in the Second Congress of the Communist International with Olbracht and Hugo Sonnenschein and was a founding member of the Communist Party of Czechoslovakia.

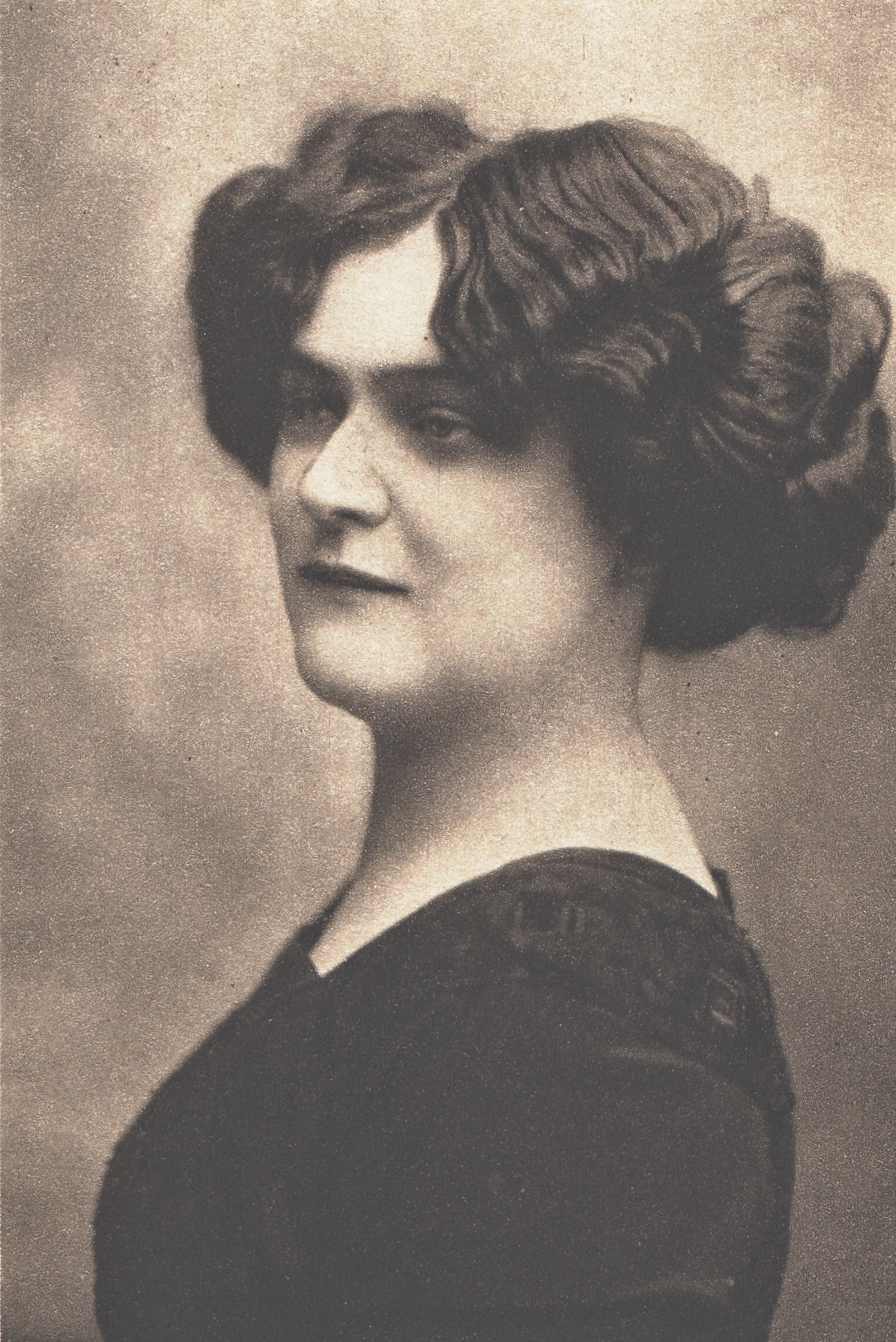
Malířová in late 1910s

Malířová, Olbracht and other well-known writers signed the 1929 Manifesto of the Seven in protest against the cultural policy of the new KSČ leadership. She along the other writers were expelled from the party.

Malířová's work is characterized by her commitment to communism and the women's movement. Her theme is the struggle of women for self-realization and against social constraints. The literary high point of her work is the 1930s, when she begins to experiment with fragmentary and more complex literary forms. Malířová also wrote fairy tales and children's literature and translated the works of famous European writers such as Victor Hugo, Claude Farrère, B. Traven and Thomas Mann.

Malířová and Olbracht remained partners until 1935, when he left her for his future wife Jaroslav Kellerová. In 1936, she again traveled to several European countries and visited, together with a delegation of Czech intellectuals, Spain during the Civil War to support the Republican cause.

She died of heart disease in 1940 in Prague during the Nazi occupation. Her urn was placed in the columbarium in Prague-Strašnice. Later, her sister Růžena Nasková was also buried in the same grave.

== Works ==
- Lidské srdce (1901)
- Právo na štěstí (1908)
- Malé příběhy (1910)
- Víno (1912)
- Popel (1914)
- Rudé besídky
- Požehnání (1920)
- Povídky s dobrým koncem (1923)
- Deset životů (1937)
- Barva krve
- Vítězství
- Stříbrný racek a jiné povídky
- Křehké květiny
- Mariola
- Dědictví
- Nový rok
- Pod kaštanem (1939)
- Zápisky z nemoci
