= Eduard Urx =

Czechoslovak communist politician and journalist (1903-1942)

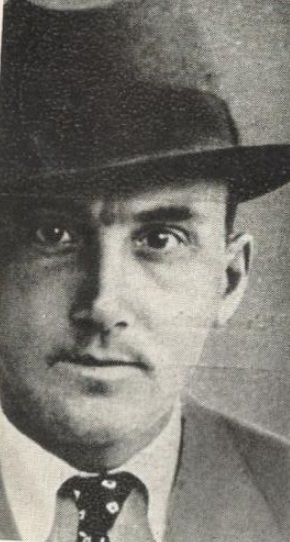
- Born: Eduard Vincenc Urx; 29 January 1903; Velká nad Veličkou, Austria-Hungary
- Died: 20 April 1942 (aged 39); Mauthausen concentration camp, Nazi Germany
- Occupations: Literary critic and theorist, journalist, philosopher, poet
- Political party: Communist Party of Czechoslovakia

Eduard Vincenc Urx (29 January 1903 – 20 April 1942) was a Czechoslovak communist politician, journalist, essayist, literary critic and theorist. A member of the anti-fascist resistance movement, he was captured and murdered by the Nazis during the occupation.

== Biography ==
Urx was born in 1903 in Velká nad Veličkou, into the family of a forestry official. He was baptized a Catholic but he left the Church in 1924. From 1922 to 1925 he studied philosophy and Czech and German philology at Charles University, but did not finish his studies and became a member of the Free Association of Socialist Students from Slovakia. He joined the Communist Party of Czechoslovakia (KSČ) in 1924.

He was involved in the founding of the DAV magazine. Due to theoretical disagreement he left the group with Peter Jilemnický.

Urx was engaged in journalistic and propaganda. Urx was a close associate of Klement Gottwald and supported his new leadership. From 1929 to 1931 and 1938, Urx was the editor of the central KSČ organ Rudé právo newspaper. In 1931 he was sentenced to nine months in prison for his activities and was secretly sent to study in Moscow, where he simultaneously worked in the apparatus of the Comintern. He also published under the pseudonym M. Biss. From 1938, he edited the illegal edition of Rudé právo.

After the German occupation of Czechoslovakia, Urx became involved in the resistance and was elected chairman of the underground Central Committee of the Communist Party of Czechoslovakia. Urx was primarily involved in publishing anti-nazi literature and maintaining connections with the Communist Party leadership in Moscow.

In 1941, he was arrested by the Gestapo and imprisoned in the Pankrác Prison, then transferred to the Terezín concentration camp, and later to the Mauthausen concentration camp, where he was killed in 1942.

== Selected works ==
- Filosofie československé vládnoucí třídy, Tvorba 1930;
- Ke kritice formální logiky, Československá filosofie. Několik poznámek o dějinách filosofie a hlavně o spisu dr. Josefa Krále, Tvorba 1938.
