= Peter Kerecman =

Slovak lawyer and non-fiction author (born 1972)

Peter Kerecman (born 16 September 1972, Košice, Czechoslovakia) is a Slovak lawyer and non-fiction author. He published several books and more than 90 journal articles on press freedom, history of advocacy and other law areas.

In 1995, he graduated from Faculty of Law of Pavol Jozef Šafárik University in Košice and in 1999 he obtained Doctor of Law degree. In 1995–2000 he studied Criminal Law at the Faculty of Law of University of Comenius in Bratislava (PhD.) and worked as an associate.

Kerecman opened his own law firm in 2000 in Košice. He is currently one of seven members of Slovak Republic Press Council (since 2004), the top body of Association for the Protection of Journalists' Ethics in the Slovak Republic. He is also an external advisor to Constitutional Court of the Slovak Republic (since 2007), chairman of Advocacy History Commission of the Slovak Bar Association, a member of Amnesty International and Society of Advocacy History (Czech: Společnost pro historii advokácie) in Prague.

He is also editorial board vice-chair of Bulletin of Slovak Advocacy (Slovak: Bulletin slovenskej advokácie), journal for law studies.

== Publications ==
His monographies include:

- Eutanázia, asistovaná samovražda – právne aspekty [Euthanasia, assisted suicide – law aspects] (1999)
- Novinári a sloboda tlače v rozsudkoch Európskeho súdu pre ľudské práva [Journalists and press freedom in European Court of Human Rights decisions] (2003)
- Kapitoly z dejín advokácie na Slovensku [Chapters from advocacy history in Slovakia] (2005)
- Sloboda prejavu novinára a ochrana pred jej zneužitím [Freedom of speech and protection from its misuse] (2009)
- História advokácie na Slovensku [History of advocacy in Slovakia] (2011, co-author with R. Manik)
- Advokát Janko Jesenský, spisovateľ a legionár [Attorney Janko Jesenský, author and legionare] (2014, co-author with M. Caplovič)
- Advokát Ivan Horváth a advokáti v jeho diele [Attorney Ivan Horváth and attorneys in his works] (2014).
