= Vladimír Clementis =

Slovak politician, lawyer and author

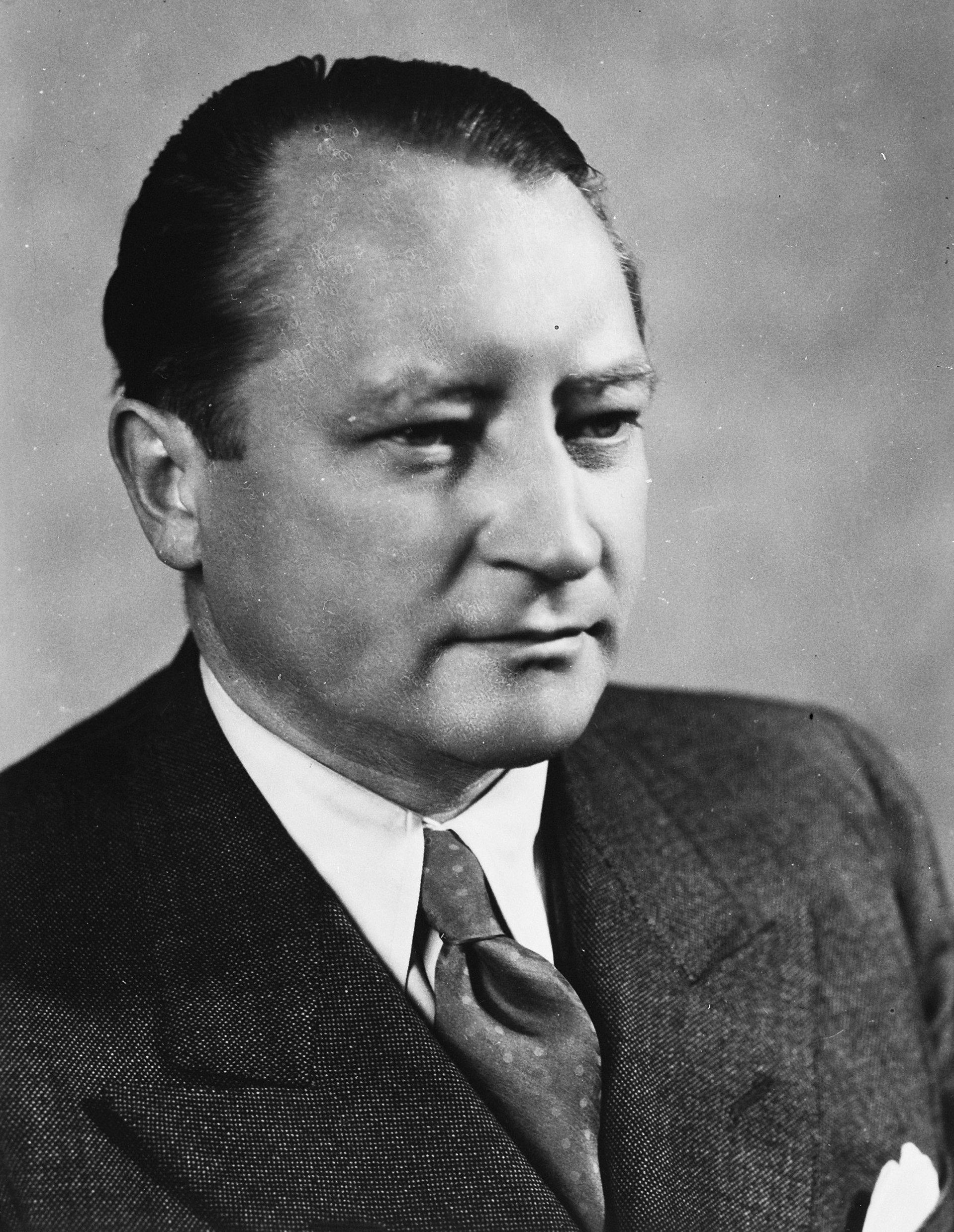
- Clementis in 1948

Minister of Foreign Affairs
- In office 18 March 1948 – 14 March 1950
- Prime Minister: Klement Gottwald (1948); Antonín Zápotocký (1948–1950)
- Preceded by: Jan Masaryk
- Succeeded by: Viliam Široký

Personal details
- Born: 20 September 1902 Tisovec, Gömör és Kishont County, Kingdom of Hungary
- Died: 3 December 1952 (aged 50) Prague, Czechoslovakia
- Party: Czechoslovak Communist Party

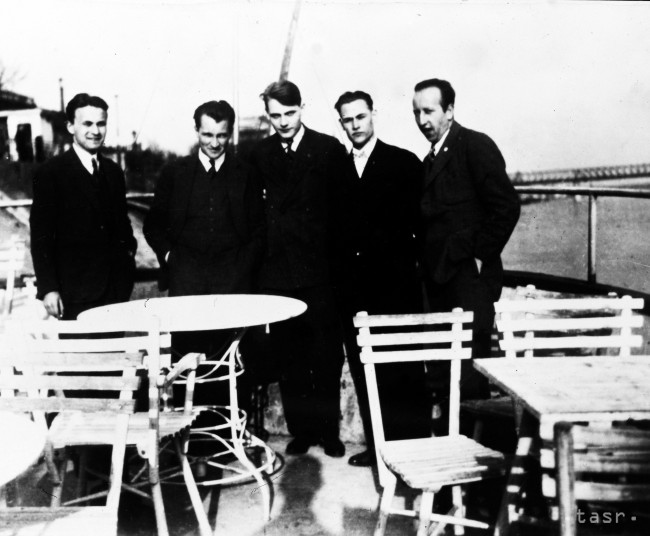
Clementis (second from left) as a member of the editorial of Dav, 1920s

Vladimír "Vlado" Clementis (20 September 1902 – 3 December 1952) was a Slovak politician, lawyer, publicist, literary critic, author and a prominent member of the Czechoslovak Communist Party. Between 1948 and 1950, he served as Minister of Foreign Affairs of Czechoslovakia. In 1952, he was accused of "Titoism" and "national deviation" during the Slánský trial and executed.

== Biography ==
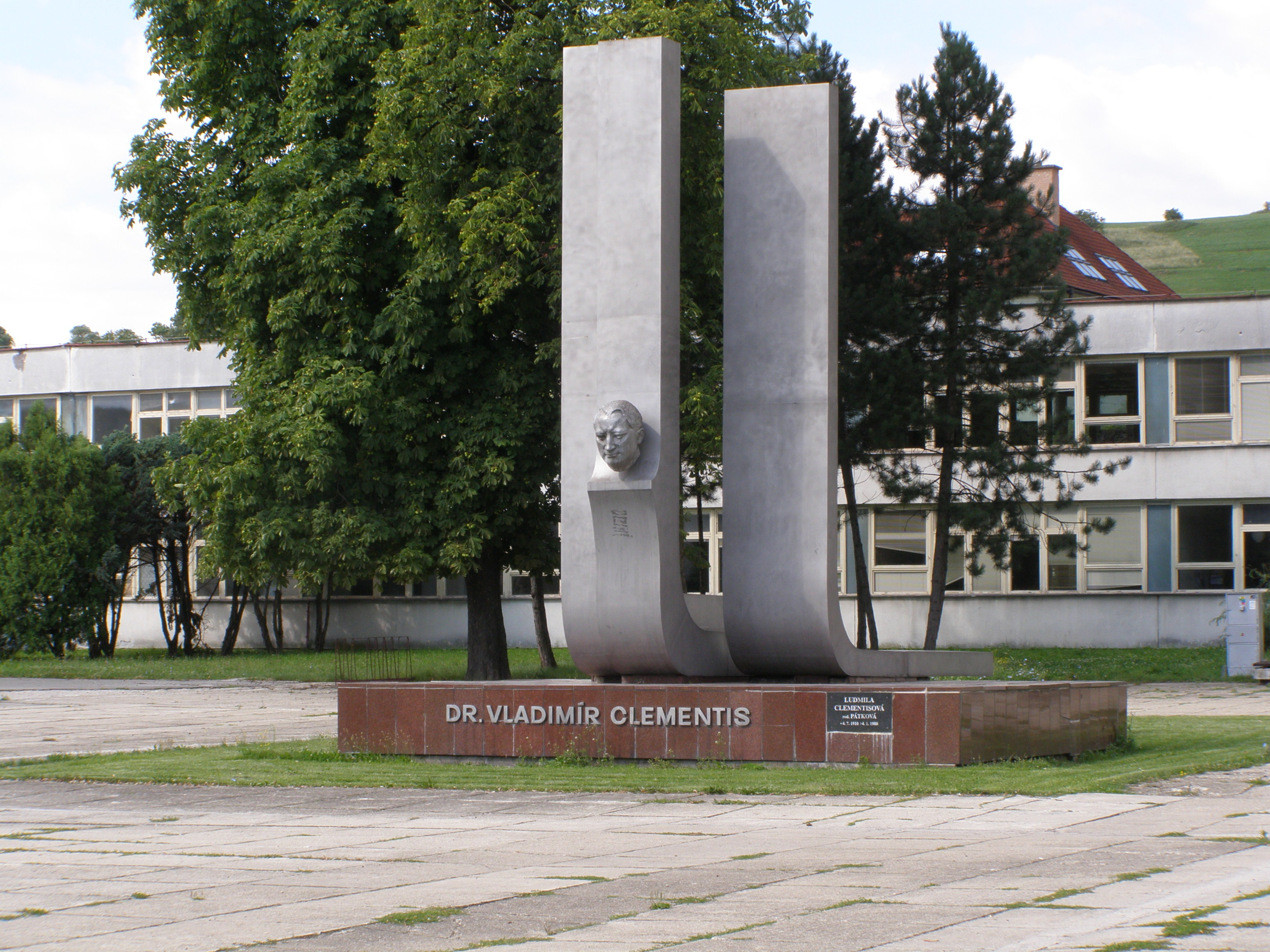
Monument to Vladimír Clementis in his birth town of Tisovec

After attending gymnasium in Skalica, Clementis studied in Germany and France before graduating with a Ph.D. from the Faculty of Law of Charles University in Prague. During his studies, he took an interest in the philosophy of Emanuel Rádl, František Krejčí and Vilém Forster. He also served as co-editor of Dav, a cultural and political journal that had broad influence in inter-war Czechoslovakia, particularly among Slovaks. As editor of Dav, Clementis published works by writers such as Martin Rázus, Milo Urban, Ján Smrek, Gejza Vámoš and T. Gašpar. In addition, together with Novomeský and modernist artists such as Ľudovít Fulla and Mikuláš Galanda, the editorial of Dav designed original modern graphics supplemented by contemporary artists. Another contribution of Clementis was the sociographic tours of the Davists to Kysuce and Horehronie, which contributed to the awareness of the social situation at that time. He also stirred up a discussion about the bloody events in Košúty in May 1931, where protesters were shot and killed during a strike, by writing letters to Romain Rolland, Henri Barbusse and Maxim Gorky.

A member of the Communist Party of Czechoslovakia (KSČ) from 1925, Clementis ran a law practice in Bratislava from the early 1930s, while also organizing communist cells in Slovakia. From 1935, he was a deputy of the KSČ to the National Assembly. After the occupation of the Czech lands by Nazi Germany shortly before the beginning of World War II, he emigrated to Paris in 1938. His public criticism of the Molotov–Ribbentrop Pact in 1939 directly contradicted the policies of the KSČ leadership, at this point exiled to Moscow, and triggered an intra-party investigation overseen by Viliam Široký. In the summer of 1940 Clementis left Paris for the United Kingdom, where he was interned in Scotland for a period of time because of his communist views. After his release, he was appointed by Edvard Beneš to the London-based Czechoslovak National Council. He also made radio broadcasts during the Slovak National Uprising, calling on the Slovak people to join the fight against Nazi Germany. During the Bratislava–Brno offensive, he unsuccessfully complained to Marshal Ivan Konev about the mass rapes by Red Army soldiers against Czechoslovak civilians.

In April 1945, Clementis was named State Secretary for Foreign Affairs in Zdeněk Fierlinger's government, which was formed in Košice during the retreat of the German forces. After the Czechoslovak coup d'état of 1948, which he helped organise, he succeeded Jan Masaryk as Minister of Foreign Affairs. As Deputy Minister, Clementis supported Czechoslovakia's rejection of the Marshall Plan in July 1947. He also opted for the incorporation of the area west of the Olza river and the Kłodzko Valley into Czechoslovakia, which led to a conflict with Poland. As Minister of Foreign Affairs, he was instrumental in organizing Czechoslovakia's part in Operation Balak by providing assistance to the newly founded Israeli Air Force.

In 1950, Clementis was forced to resign amid accusations of being a "deviationist". He was then arrested and charged for an illegal attempt to cross the state boundaries, later changed to the more serious crime of being a "bourgeois nationalist" and participating in a Trotskyite-Titoite-Zionist conspiracy. After being convicted in the Slánský trial, he was hanged in December 1952. His ashes were scattered on a road close to Prague. His wife, Lída, received only her husband's two pipes and tobacco and was discharged from a prison.

Clementis was rehabilitated in 1963. A year later, his book Nedokončená kronika ("Unfinished Chronicle") was published; in 1967, a selection of his work in two volumes, Vzduch našich čias ("Air of our Times"), was published; in 1968 Listy z väzenia ("Letters from Prison"), consisting of letters between him and his wife Lída; and in 1977 the selection O kultúre a umení ("About Culture and Art").

In a famous photograph from 21 February 1948, Vladimír Clementis is seen standing next to KSČ leader and Prime Minister Klement Gottwald. After the trial and execution of Clementis in 1952, he was erased from the photograph. The story is described in The Book of Laughter and Forgetting by Czech novelist Milan Kundera.

== In modern Slovakia ==
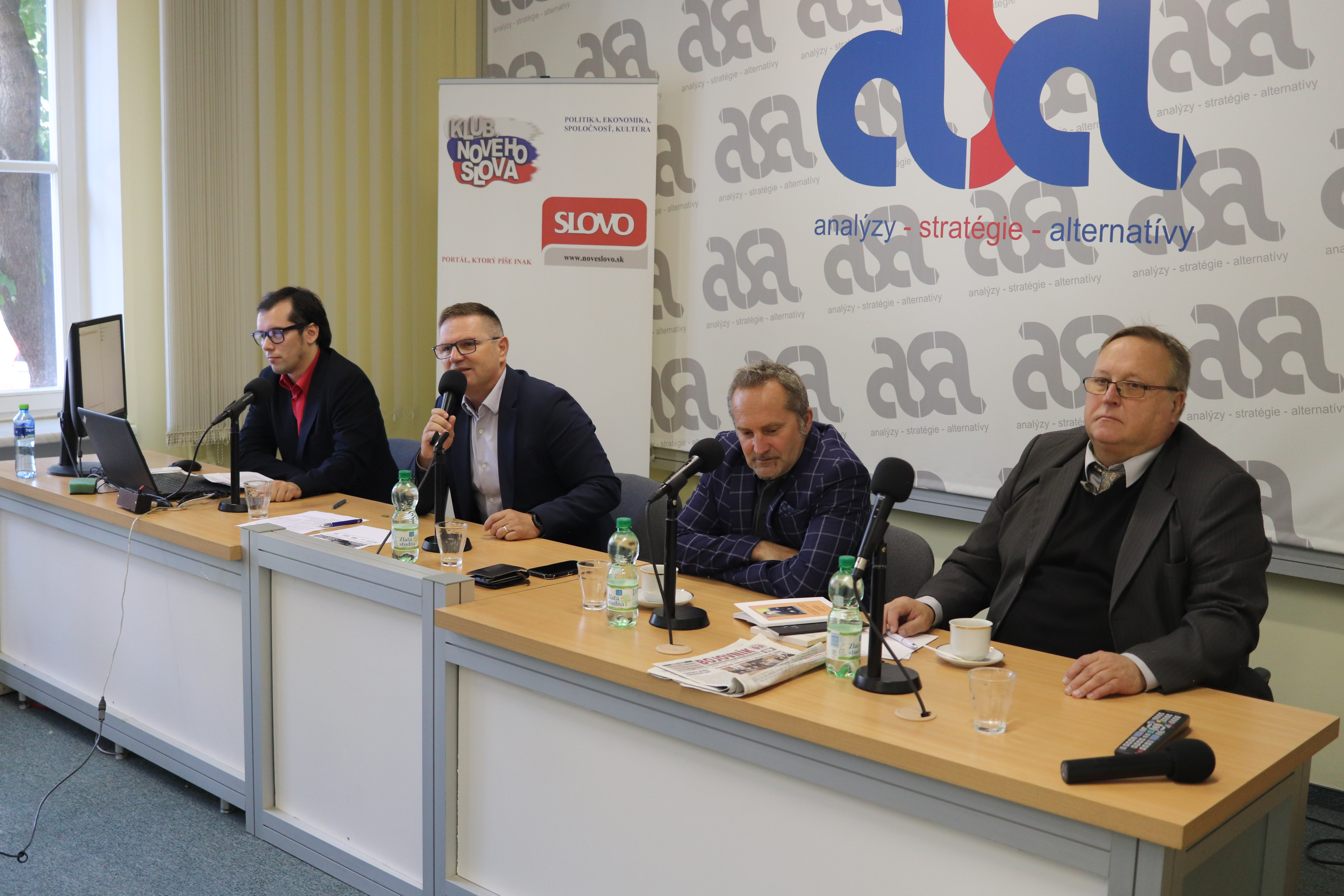
Conference on the 120th anniversary of Vladimír Clementis and the 100th anniversary of Vladimír Mináč (ASA, Nové Slovo, Slovak Matica, SZPB), October 2022

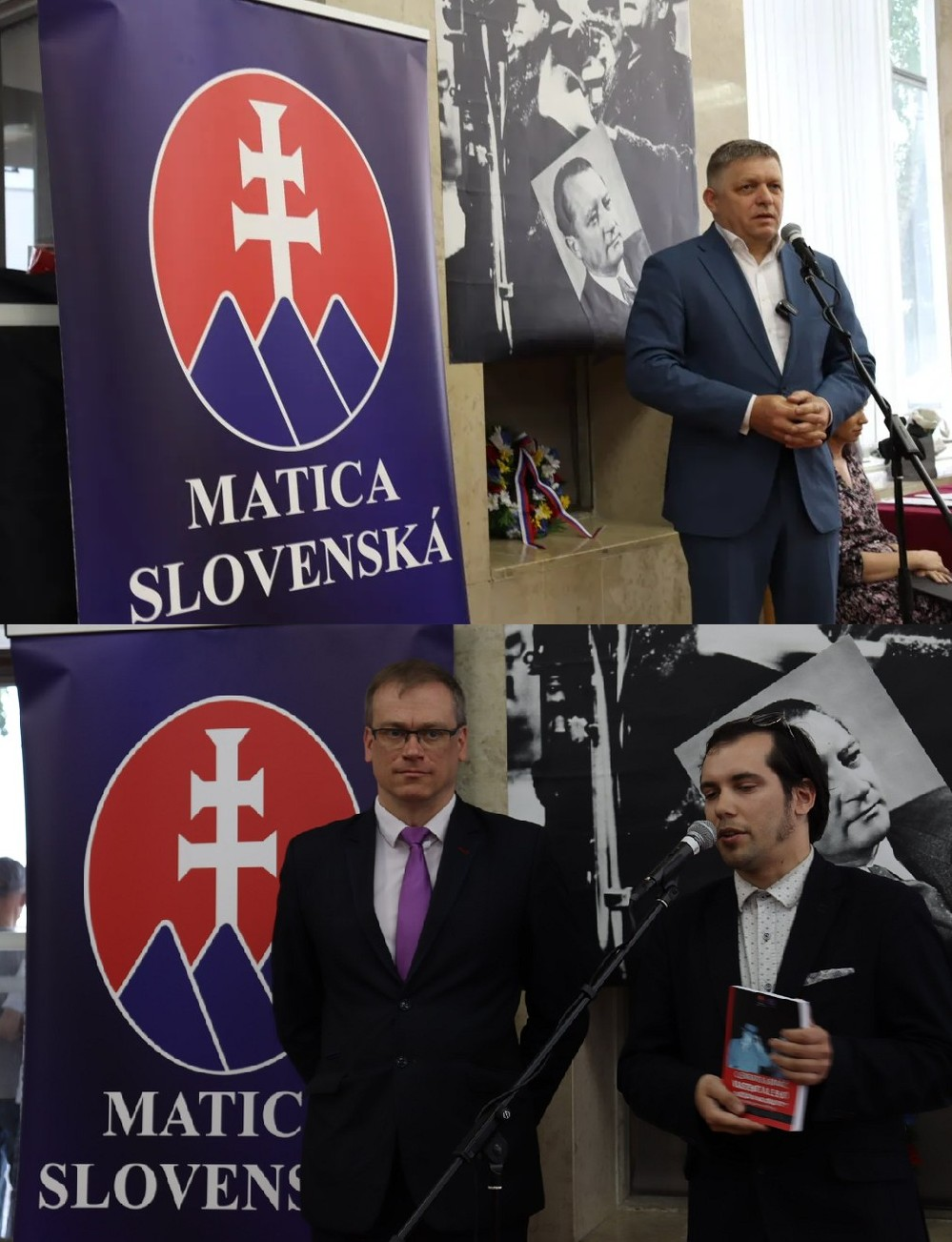
Past and future Prime Minister of the Slovak Republic Robert Fico in 2023 at the event for the 120th anniversary of Vladimír Clementis (Matica slovenská) at the presentation of the book Clementis & Mináč (Lukáš Perný, Marián Gešper).jpg

A sculpture of Vladimír Clementis was unveiled by the Slovak Foreign Minister Ján Kubiš and Prime Minister Robert Fico at the Ministry of Foreign Affairs in 2007. In 2002, 2012 and 2022, three conferences about Vladimir Clementis were organized in Bratislava. In 2022, Slovak Matica and ASA Institute organized a conference to Vladimír Clementis on the 120th anniversary of his birth. The same year, Slovak Matica dedicated a lecture in his native Tisovec; and dedicated a bust to Vladimír Clementis in Rimavská Sobota (Alley of National Heroes).

== Honours and awards ==
=== Czechoslovak honours ===
- Hero of the Czechoslovak Socialist Republic (posthumously), 29 April 1968

=== Foreign honours ===
- (Poland) Grand Cross of the Order of Polonia Restituta, 1947

== See also ==
- Klement Gottwald
- Photo manipulation
- The Book of Laughter and Forgetting

== Footnotes ==
Government offices
| Preceded by Jan Masaryk | Minister of Foreign Affairs of Czechoslovakia; 1948–1950 | Succeeded by Viliam Široký |
