= Andrej Sirácky =

Slovak sociologist and philosopher

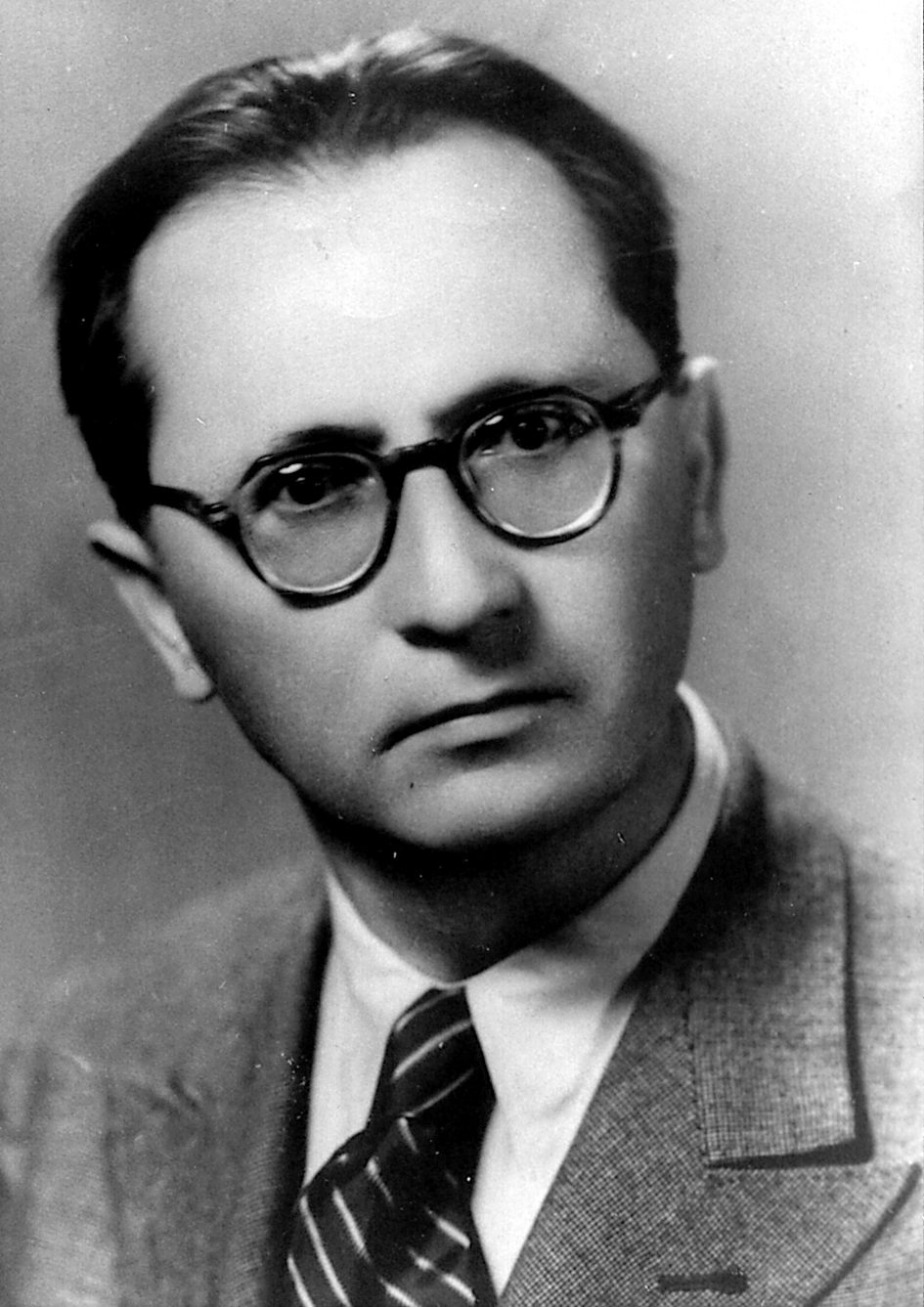
- Born: 9 December 1900; Bački Petrovac, Austria-Hungary
- Died: 29 September 1988 (aged 87); Bratislava, Czechoslovakia

Academic background
- Education: Charles University

Academic work
- Discipline: Sociology
- Institutions: Czechoslovak Academy of Sciences; Slovak Academy of Sciences

Andrej Sirácky (9 December 1900 – 29 September 1988) was a Slovak sociologist, philosopher, political scientist and communist official.

== Biography ==
After graduating from the grammar school in Vrbas in 1921, he applied to study philosophy at Charles University in Prague, which he finished with a doctorate in 1926.

During his studies in Prague, he met Slovak left-wing intellectuals and students and became a founding member of the DAV group. After completing his studies, he returned home to Petrovac in Vojvodina, where he taught with a break at the Slovak gymnasium until 1941. He participated in the Slovak resistance during World War II and was imprisoned in Budapest. After his release, he briefly worked as an editor of the journal Slovenská jednota. In August 1948, he moved to Slovakia, where he began working at Comenius University and from 1953 to 1955 he was its rector. Sirácky was also chairman of the Slovak Academy of Sciences from 1955 to 1961. He successively obtained the academic titles of docent and professor and scientific academician of SAV. He was also as academician of the Czechoslovak Academy of Sciences.

He was also a member of the Slovak National Council from 1960 to 1964 and also held positions in the Communist Party of Slovakia and was a member of the Central Committee of the KSS from 1971 to 1976. He was opposed to political liberalization in Czechoslovakia in 1968 during the Prague Spring, and in the following years, he held normalization positions and spoke out against "right-wing opportunism" within the party.

== Works ==
Sirácky represented Marxist–Leninist philosophy and sociology in Czechoslovakia. He published, among other things, on historical materialism and ethics and dealt critically with the bourgeois conception of humanism and bourgeois philosophical anthropology.

Selection of his works:

- Sila slov a myšlienok (Power of Words and Ideas). Petrovac, 1943
- Umierajúca civilizácia (The Dying Civilization). Petrovac, 1946
- Kultúra a mravnost' (Culture and Morality). Bratislava, 1949.
- Klérofašistická ideólogia ľudáctva (Clero-fascist ideology of humanity) Bratislava, 1955.
- Sociológia a intergrácia vied (Sociology and the integration of the sciences). Bratislava, 1968
- Sociálny svet človeka (The Social World of Man). Bratislava, 1974.
