= Jozef Murgaš =

Slovak inventor, architect, botanist, painter and Catholic priest

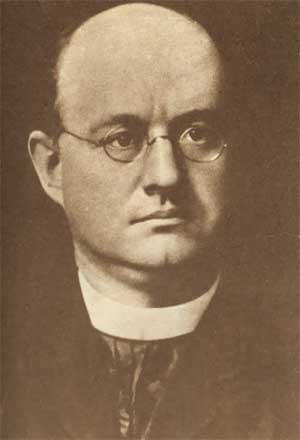
Jozef Murgaš

Jozef Murgaš (English Joseph Murgas) (17 February 1864 – 11 May 1929) was a Slovak inventor, architect, botanist, painter and Roman Catholic priest. He contributed to radio development, which at the time was commonly known as "wireless telegraphy".

Murgaš was nicknamed the Radio Priest and deemed a Renaissance man.

== Life ==
=== Europe ===
Murgaš was born in Tajov, Kingdom of Hungary, Austrian Empire (now Slovakia). He studied theology in Pozsony (German: Pressburg, present Bratislava) (1880–82), Esztergom (1882–84) and in Banská Bystrica, where he graduated in 1888. From his youth he was bright, skillful and good at painting and electrotechnology. The vice-head of the school in Esztergom allowed him to use the physics room for experiments and the Slovak painters B. Klemens and Dominik Skutecký noticed his talent for painting.

After priestly ordination in 1888, Murgaš worked as a curate. On Skutecký's initiative, Murgaš was accepted at a painting school in Budapest, where he studied from 1889–90. He also studied painting in Munich from 1890–93. He attended both schools while working. He painted sacral pieces, Slovak landscapes and Slovak personalities. It was due to his strong patriotism he exhibited during holidays in the 1890s that he was not allowed to finish his painting studies and had to work as a curate in changing places in the Kingdom of Hungary: in Chrenovec, Slovenská Ľupča, Dubová and in Lopej. In Lopej, he painted a large sacral picture of St. George which is still on the church altar of the village. The central altar painting of St. Elisabeth in the 14th century Church of St. Elizabeth in the main square of Banská Bystrica was by Murgaš.

=== United States ===
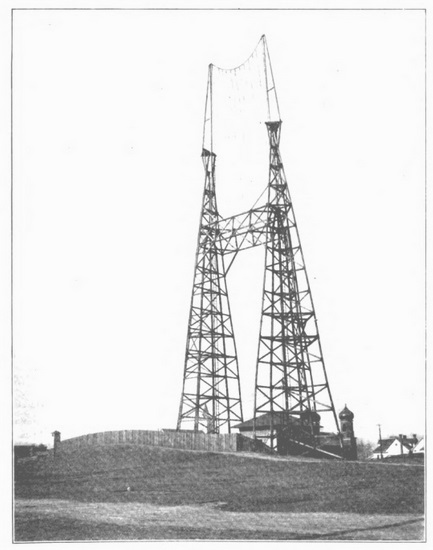
Murgas radiotelegraph station at Wilkes-Barre, Pennsylvania (1905)

Due to permanent conflicts with the bishop's secretary, Murgaš had to emigrate to the United States in 1896, where he was assigned a Slovak parish in the city of Wilkes-Barre, Pennsylvania. Having no possibility for painting, he started to deal with natural sciences again, especially electrotechnology. He established a laboratory in Wilkes-Barre, in which he primarily investigated radiotelegraphy. His article in the Tovaryšstvo magazine of 1900 shows that his radiotelegraphy studies had achieved a high level. In 1904, he received his first two US patents: the Apparatus for wireless telegraphy and The way of transmitted messages by wireless telegraphy. Fifteen additional patents followed between 1907 and 1916. Based on the first two patents, he created the Universal Aether Telegraph Co., which organized a public test of Murgaš's transmitting and receiving facilities in September 1905. The test was successful, but a storm destroyed the antenna masts three month later, which led to a dissolution of the company.

Murgaš's primary concern in Wilkes-Barre, however, were the local Slovaks. He took care of Slovak immigrants; he maintained a new church, library, cemetery, several schools, gymnasium and playgrounds, many of which are still used by American Slovaks. He was also one of the founders of the Saints Cyril and Methodius community and took care of children and youth. He was very popular among religious people because of his emotional relation to them. He also published a newspaper, in which he published some popular science articles and verses.

Murgaš was active in the Slovak expatriates movement, wrote articles for their press, was one of the founders of the Slovak League in America, actively supported the creation of the state of Czechoslovakia, organized a money collection (a fund) of American Slovaks for the creation of Czechoslovakia (US$1,000,000) and was also a co-author and a signatory of the Pittsburgh Agreement (1918) between Czechs and Slovaks on establishing Czechoslovakia. As a respected personality, he gained the trust and support of the highest authorities in the United States for the establishment of Czechoslovakia.

Murgaš continued to study physics and experiment. He financed his activities by selling his paintings. He also collected mushrooms, plants, minerals and insects. His butterfly collection comprised 9,000 pieces from all over the world.

When the United States entered World War I, private radiotelegraphy stations were prohibited which put an end to Murgaš's pioneer work in this field. After the creation of Czechoslovakia, he returned to Slovakia in 1920, where he taught electrotechnology at a high school but since he did not find appropriate understanding by the Ministry of Education in Prague, he returned to Wilkes-Barre four months later. Murgaš died in Wilkes-Barre in 1929.

In 2026, Murgaš was announced as a posthumous inductee into the Luzerne County Arts & Entertainment Hall of Fame.

==== Importance ====
In 1905, Murgaš achieved radiotelegraph transmission between Wilkes-Barre and Scranton, Pennsylvania, a distance of 20 miles (32 km). The tone system used sounds of various frequencies, i.e. for Morse code, Murgaš substituted a higher pitched tone for "dots," and a lower tone for "dashes".

Thomas Edison paid remarkable attention to Murgaš's experiments and he is said to have informed Guglielmo Marconi of Murgaš's success. Murgaš's lab in Wilkes-Barre was visited by President Theodore Roosevelt in 1905.

== Patents 1904 - 1916 ==
- U.S. patent 759,825 "Wireless-telegraph apparatus" (1904)
- U.S. patent 759,826 "The way of transmitted messages by wireless telegraphy" (1904)
- U.S. patent 860,051 "Constructing Antennas for Wireless Telegraphy" (July 16, 1907).
- U.S. patent 848,675 "Wave meter" (1907)
- U.S. patent 848,676 "Electrical transformer" [1907)
- U.S. patent 860,051 "Underground wireless telegraphy"
- U.S. patent 876,383 "Apparatus for making electromagnetic waves" (1908)
- U.S. patent 915,993 "Wireless telegraphy"(1909)
- U.S. patent 917,103 "Making of sparkles frequency from power supply without interrupter"(1909)
- U.S. patent 917,104 "Magnetic waves detector"(1909)
- U.S. patent 930,780 "Magnetic detector" (1909)
- U.S. patent 1,001,975 "Apparatus for making electrical oscillations" (1911)
- U.S. patent 1,024,739 "Spinning reel for fishing rod" (1912)
- U.S. patent 1,196,696 Improved invention in the United States; given in England GB9726 in 1907
- U.S. patent 1,196,969 "The way and apparatus for making electrical alternating current oscillations" (1916)
- Co-author of 2 inventions concerned with electrical arc lamps (1910)

== Memorials and honors ==
In Tajov, there is Murgaš's house where he was born, a memorial room and a symbolic grave with a sepulchral monument of Murgaš at the local cemetery. Jozef Šebo, the founder of the room and monument (now a retired teacher) looks after them very carefully. The memorial room also features originals of pictures, paintings, some unique pieces from his butterfly collection, models of inventions in wireless telegraphy and documents. One can also see there a minimodel of Murgaš's original antenna masts built by company Universal Aether Telegraph Co. in Wilkes-Barre in 1905.

Further objects include:

- Rev. Jozef Murgaš Room at King's College (Pennsylvania)
- Jozef Murgaš Monument in Bratislava, Slovakia – the Slovak Telecom building in the Jarošova Street
- Jozef Murgaš street in Podbrezová-Lopej, Slovakia
- Joseph Murgas Monument in Wilkes-Barre, Pennsylvania
- Paintings in a church in Wilkes-Barre in Pennsylvania
- Paintings in the Memorial room in Tajov, in some churches in Lopej and Banská Bystrica
- Murgas Amateur Radio Club of Wilkes-Barre, PA named after Fr. Murgas in 1975.
- Model of Murgas' transmitting station in Wilkes-Barre
- Collection of butterflies (9,000 pieces) from all over the world
- Liberty ship SS Joseph Murgas in the U.S. state Georgia in 1944
- Jozef Murgaš High School of Electrical Engineering in Banská Bystrica, Slovakia
- Jozef Murgaš Primary School in Šaľa, Slovakia
- Jozef Murgaš stamp issued by the Ministry of Transport, Communications and Public Works of the Slovak Republic in 1994 (400,000 pieces) on the occasion of the 130th birth anniversary (1864) of Jozef Murgaš.

To the memory of Murgaš and to support the development of telecommunications in Slovakia, the Jozef Murgaš Award is awarded annually by the Slovak Electrotechnical Society and Ministry of Transport, Posts and Telecommunications of the Slovak Republic for:

- publication of original theoretical contribution supporting development of telecommunication in Slovakia and
- utilization of original or foreign theoretical contribution to development of telecommunications and telecommunication industry in Slovakia.

== See also ==
- List of Roman Catholic scientist-clerics
