= Pohorelá =

Pohorelá Koháryháza
- Municipality
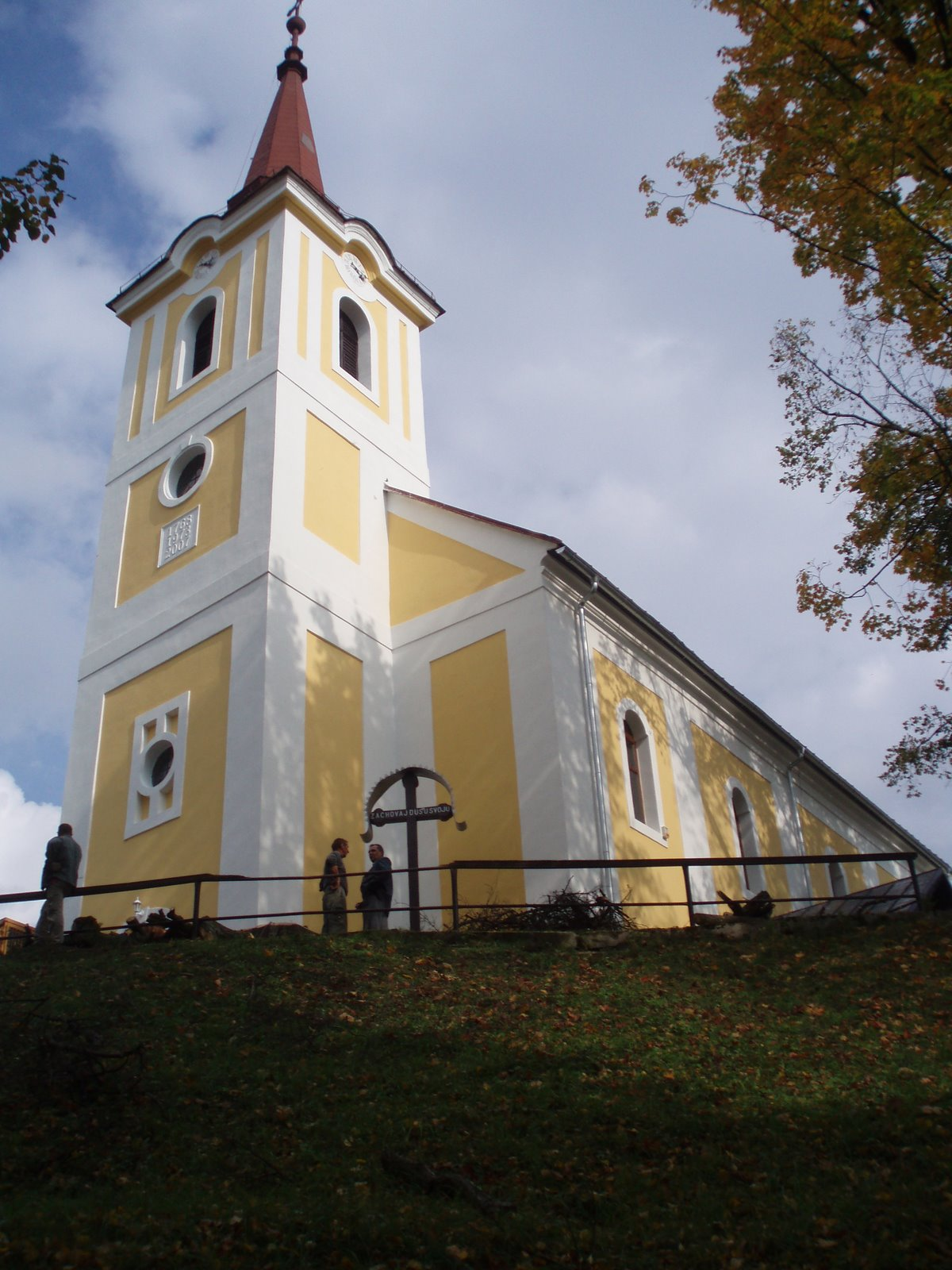

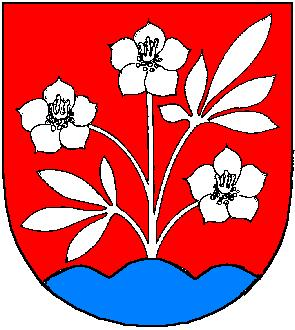
- Flag Coat of arms

- Location of Pohorelá in the Banská Bystrica Region Location of Pohorelá in Slovakia
- Coordinates: 48.87°N 20.02°E
- Country: Slovakia
- Region: Banská Bystrica Region
- District: Brezno District
- First mentioned: 1612

Government
  - Mayor: Jana Tkáčiková (Ind.)

Area
  - Total: 46.93 km^{2} (18.12 sq mi)
- Elevation: 724 m (2,375 ft)

Population (2025)
  - Total: 2,020
- Time zone: UTC+1 (CET)
  - Summer (DST): UTC+2 (CEST)
- Postal code: 976 69
- Area code: +421 48
- Vehicle registration plate (until 2022): BR
- Website: www.pohorela.sk

Pohorelá (Hungarian: Koháryháza, German: Pohorella) is a village and municipality in the Brezno District, of the Banská Bystrica Region of central Slovakia. It is located in the foothills of the Low Tatras range of the Carpathian Mountains, on the right bank of the upper Hron River. The village is located 33 km east of Brezno, 49 km southwest of Poprad, and 37 km north of Tisovec on First Class Road 66. Pohorelá is the third largest village of the Horehronie region. The Roman Catholic Pohorela church, built in 1762, is a dominant feature of the village. The village was known as Garamkohó for a time in the early 20th century.

Pohorelá is located in the heart of the ethnographic area known as Horehronie, which is known for its natural beauty and traditional folk culture. Despite this, Pohorelá is a Goral inhabited village. Pohorelá hosts the World Scything Championship every summer.

== Geography ==
The municipality lies at an altitude of 724 metres (2,375 ft) and covers an area of 46.93 km^{2} (18.12 sq mi) (2025).

Pohorelá lies on the right bank of the Hron, on the edge of the Low Tatras. On the left bank of the Hron, the Vepor Mountains rise steeply, forming a subrange of the Slovak Ore Mountains; the area is part of the Muránska Planina National Park. The entire right bank of the Hron is part of the protection zone of the Low Tatras National Park.

Important geographical points in the vicinity of the village are Ždiar Saddle, Orlová Peak, Andrejcová Hill, Mašianske skalky nature reserve and the Pohorelá uplands. At the upper end of the village are mineral water springs.

== History ==
A long distance road between the Spiš and Horehronie regions has passed through the Hron valley since antiquity. A rare archaeological finding of a barbarian hoard from the Early Iron Age (Balas 1960,70) was found within the town limits - probably an excavation of the Puchov culture. The Horehronie region, along with the rest of what was to become modern Slovakia, became a part of the Kingdom of Hungary around 1000 AD. The village was founded at the beginning of the seventeenth century under the Vlach law, on the estate lands of Muráň Castle. The oldest written mention of the village dates back to 1612. The indigenous people of the region engaged in shepherding and forestry.

In the eighteenth century, iron ore mines were opened and the ironworks were built. The construction of houses for workers of the Pohorelá ironworks established the current neighboring settlement of Pohorelská Maša. In about 1830, ownership of the ironworks passed to Prince Ferdinand of Saxe-Coburg and Gotha, and the administration was moved to Pohorelá. After extensive modernization, the Pohorelá complex became the most important iron producer in what was then the Hungarian county of Gömör és Kishont. By 1844, the industrial complex along the Hron River consisted of 2 smelters, 15 forges, 3 sheet rolling mills, and 2 iron bar rolling mills.

From 1867, the area was within the Hungarian half of the Austro-Hungarian Empire, as a part of Gömör and Kishont County. The independence of Czechoslovakia was first announced in Pohorelá on about the 30th of October, 1918. Though a civic guard was formed, the village experienced some instability over the following first months of independence. The first elections for the National Assembly took place in April 1920, with the Slovak National Party winning the majority of votes in the village.

From 1939 to 1945, Pohorelá was part of the Slovak Republic. During the Slovak National Uprising (SNP), partisans of the Katrušinov section of the Jánošík Brigade - named for the 18th century Slovak highwayman, Juraj Jánošík - were active in the vicinity of Pohorelá. The village was occupied by German and Hungarian troops in late 1944. The Romanian Army liberated Pohorelá on 29 January 1945 and it was once again part of Czechoslovakia.

The Velvet Revolution came to the area when a local chapter of the Public Against Violence(VPN) was formed in the village in early December 1989.

== Population ==
Population statistic (10 years)
Year	1995	2005	2015	2025
Count	2834	2526	2260	2020
Difference		−10.86%	−10.53%	−10.61%

Population statistic
Year	2024	2025
Count	2054	2020
Difference		−1.65%

It has a population of 2020 people (31 December 2025).

=== Ethnicity ===
Census 2021 (1+ %)
Ethnicity	Number	Fraction
Slovak	2073	96.82%
Romani	141	6.58%
Not found out	69	3.22%
Total	2141	

In year 2021 was 2141 people by ethnicity 2073 as Slovak, 141 as Romani, 69 as Not found out, 3 as Czech, 3 as Other, 2 as Russian, 2 as Canadian, 1 as Ukrainian, 1 as Italian, 1 as Rusyn, 1 as German, 1 as Hungarian and 1 as Bulgarian.

Note on population: The difference values of population numbers in the table "Population statistic" and in the sections "Ethnicity" & "Religion" is caused by the use of various statistical methods.

=== Religion ===
Census 2021 (1+ %)
Religion	Number	Fraction
Roman Catholic Church	1750	81.74%
None	227	10.6%
Not found out	75	3.5%
Greek Catholic Church	37	1.73%
Total	2141	

In year 2021 was 2141 people by religion 1750 from Roman Catholic Church, 227 from None, 75 from Not found out, 37 from Greek Catholic Church, 18 from Christian Congregations in Slovakia, 12 from Eastern Orthodox Church, 10 from Evangelical Church, 4 from Apostolic Church, 3 from Ad hoc movements, 2 from Islam, 1 from Other and not ascertained christian church, 1 from Other and 1 from Church of Jesus Christ of Latter-day Saints.

According to data from the Statistical Office of the Slovak Republic, as of December 31, 2012, the village was inhabited by 2,293 people, including 1,225 women and 1,068 men.

In 2001, the distribution of the population by nationality and ethnicity was as follows:

- Slovaks – 99.36%
- Czechs – 0.11%
- Gypsies – 0.22%
- Ukrainians – 0.04%

The religious demographics were as follows in 2001:

- Roman Catholic – 95.03%
- Byzantine Catholic – 1.49%
- Lutheran – 0.26%
- Eastern Orthodox – 0.3%
- Atheist – 1.91%
- Not stated – 0.78%

== Politics & Government ==
The village of Pohorelá is an independent territorial self-governing and administrative unit of the Slovak Republic. The branches of the municipal government are the Mayor and the Municipal Assembly. The Pohorelá Municipal Assembly consists of 9 deputies elected by the inhabitants of the municipality for a period of 4 years. The term of office of the deputies ends with the taking of the oath by the deputies of the newly elected municipal council.

The Mayor of Pohorelá is the head of the executive branch of the municipality, and is elected to serve a four-year term. Jana Tkáčiková (Ind.) is the incumbent.

← Summary of the 29 February 2020 National Council (Slovakia) election results in Pohorelá
Parties and coalitions	EU Party	EP Group		
Parties and coalitions	EU Party	EP Group	Votes	%
Direction – Social Democracy (SMER-SD)	PES	S&D	349	32.31
Ordinary People and Independent Personalities (OĽaNO)	None	EPP group	185	17.12
People's Party – Our Slovakia (ĽSNS)	APF	NI	147	13.61
We Are Family	ID Party	–	94	8.70
Slovak National Party (SNS)	None	–	62	5.37
Christian Democratic Movement (KDH)	EPP	EPP group	58	9.69
Progressive Slovakia (PS); TOGETHER – Civic Democracy (SPOLU)	ALDE	Renew Europe	39	3.61
Progressive Slovakia (PS); TOGETHER – Civic Democracy (SPOLU)	EPP	EPP group	39	3.61
Homeland (Vlasť)	None	–	36	3.33
Freedom and Solidarity (SaS)	ECR Party	ECR	33	3.05
Good Choice (Dobrá Voľba)	None	–	25	2.31
For the People (Za ľudí)	None	–	25	2.31
All other parties	N/A	–	25	2.31
Total			1,078	

== Notable residents ==
- Vladimír Clementis, frequent visitor, Communist politician, Foreign Minister of Czecho-Slovakia 1948-1950
- Pavol Dobšinský, Slovak folklorist and author of the Romantic era
- Jozef Gregor-Tajovský, prose and drama author, novelist, playwright, poet, teacher and politician; leading figure of the second wave of Slovak literary realism, lived and worked in Pohorelá as a teacher in the 1890's
- Martin Rázus, poet, dramatist, writer, politician, and Lutheran priest
- Prince August of Saxe-Coburg and Gotha, ran Pohorelá ironworks
- Prince Ferdinand of Saxe-Coburg and Gotha, owned and modernized Pohorelá ironworks
- Ferdinand I of Bulgaria, maintained a summer residence in Pohorelská Maša
- Prince Philipp of Saxe-Coburg and Gotha, visited frequently on hunting trips
- Max Švabinský, painter, draughtsman, graphic artist, and professor

== Picture gallery ==
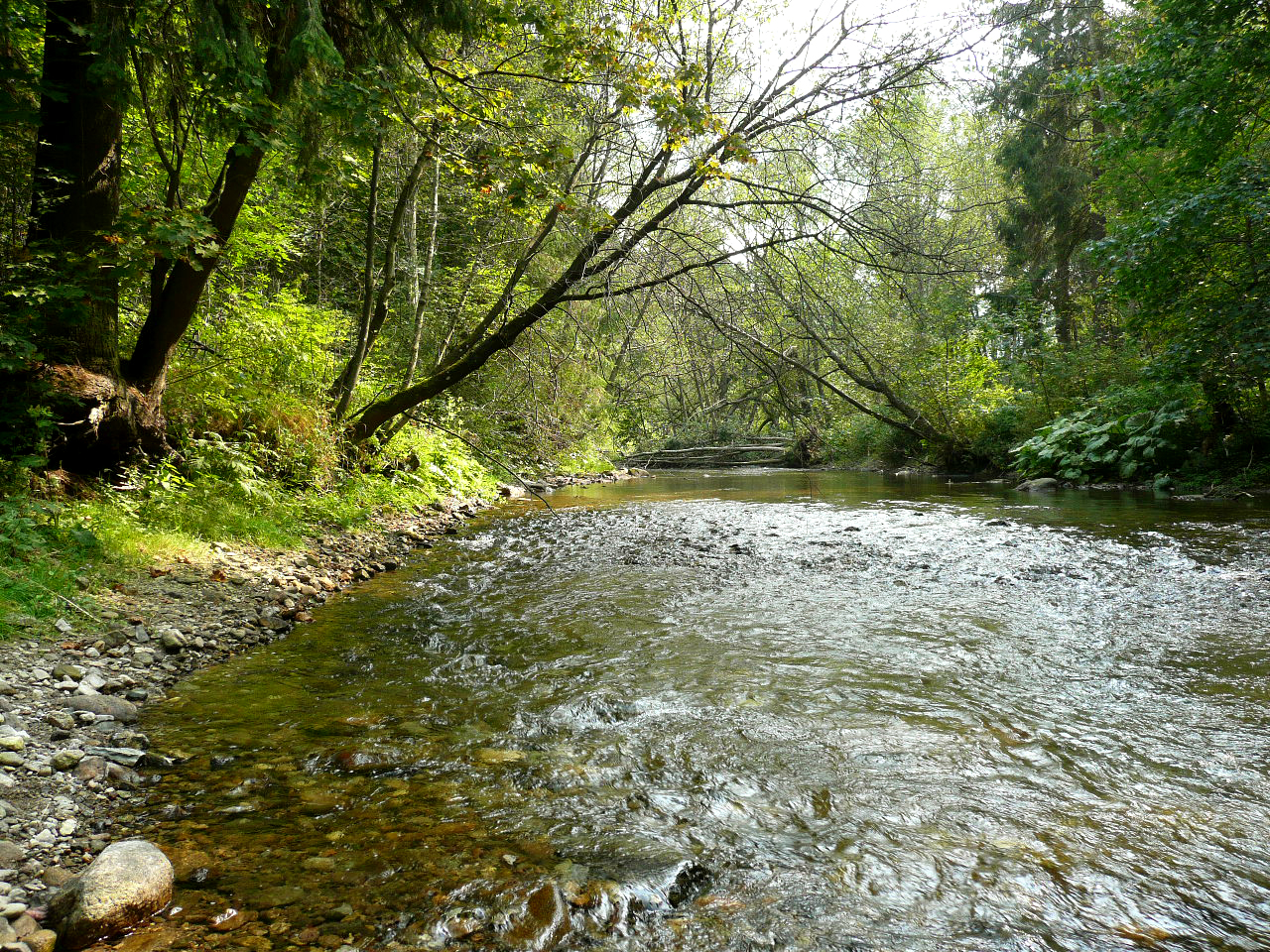
Hron river near the village

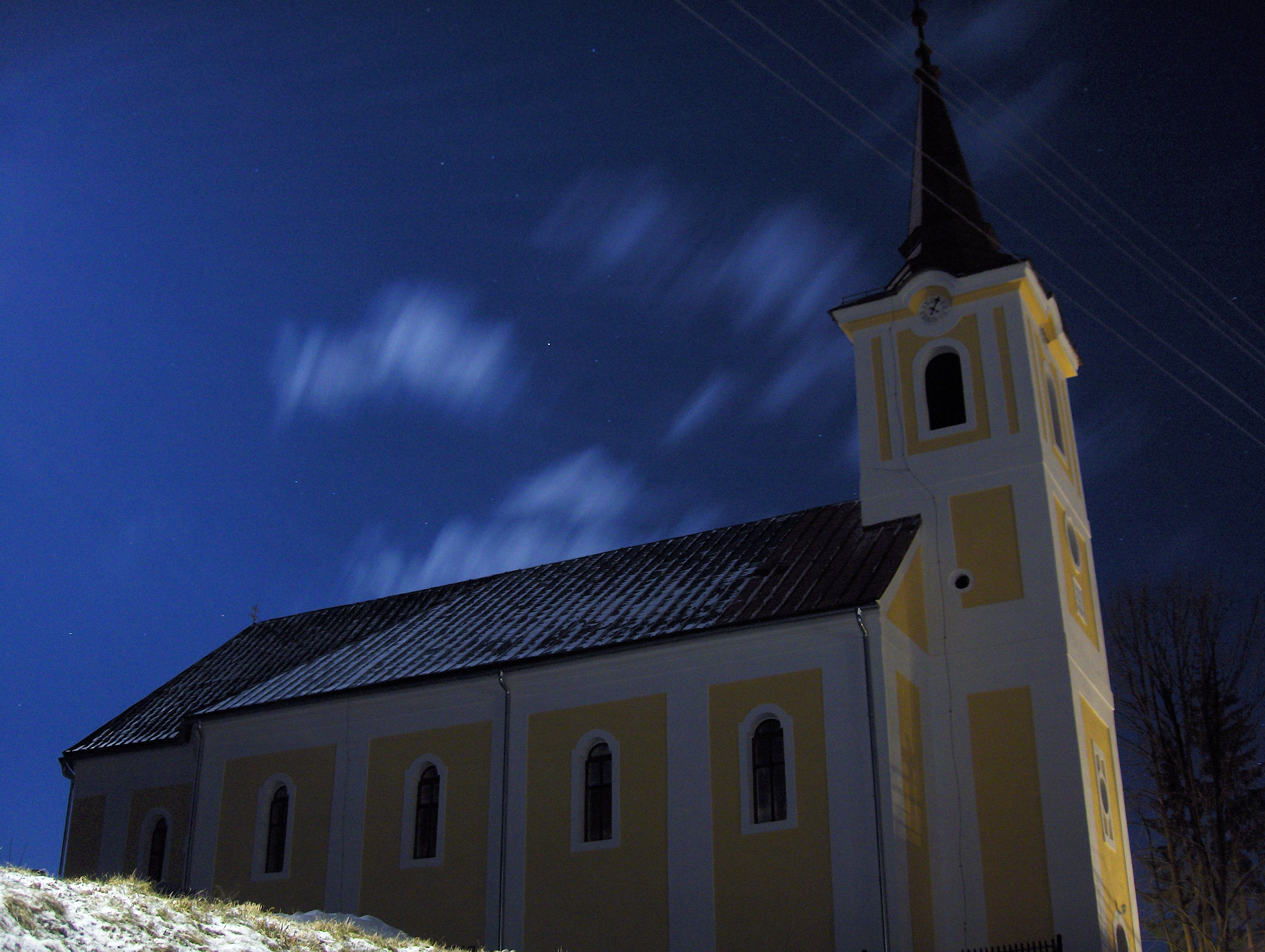
Seven Sorrows of the Virgin Mary Church

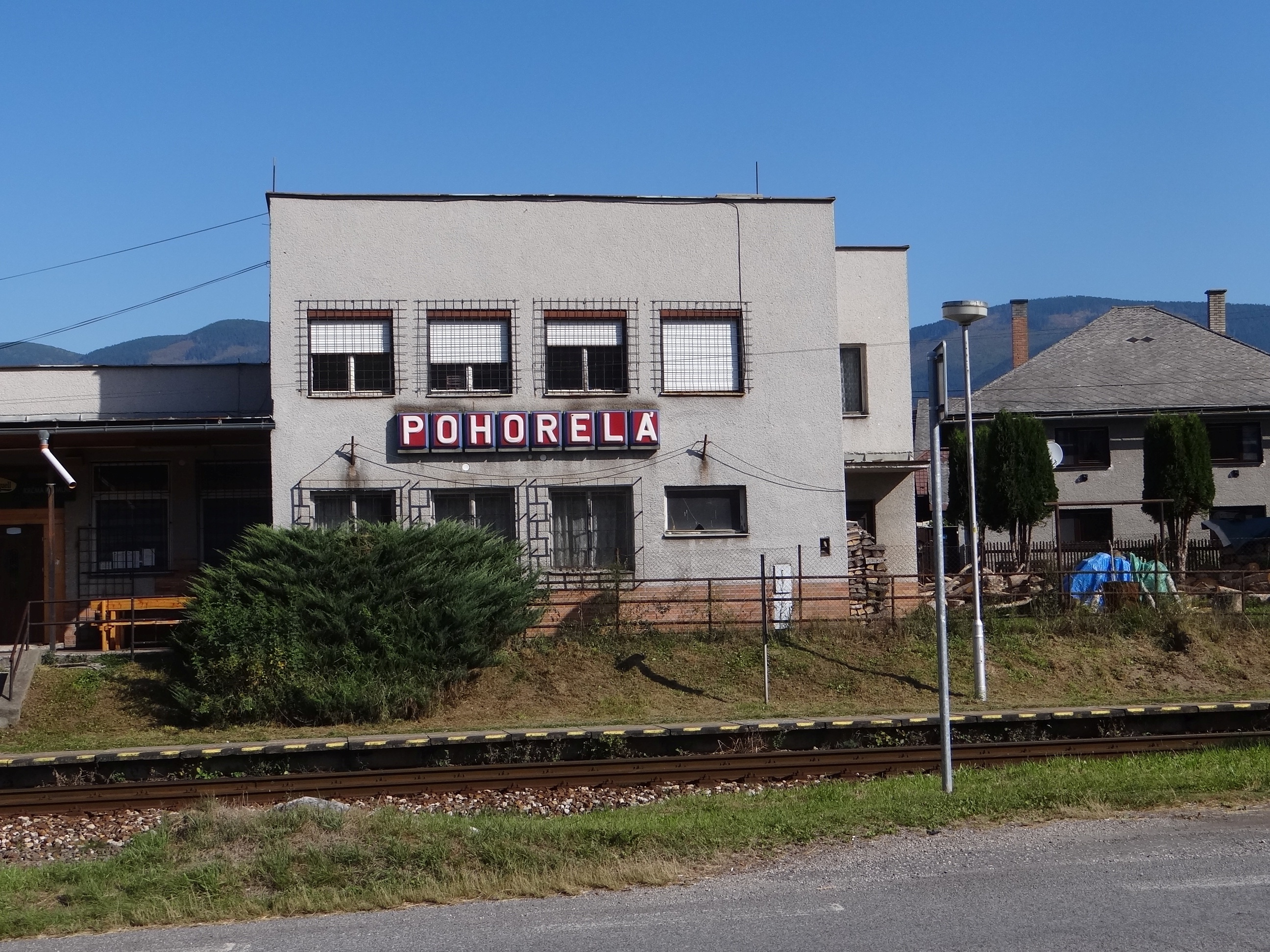
Rail Station

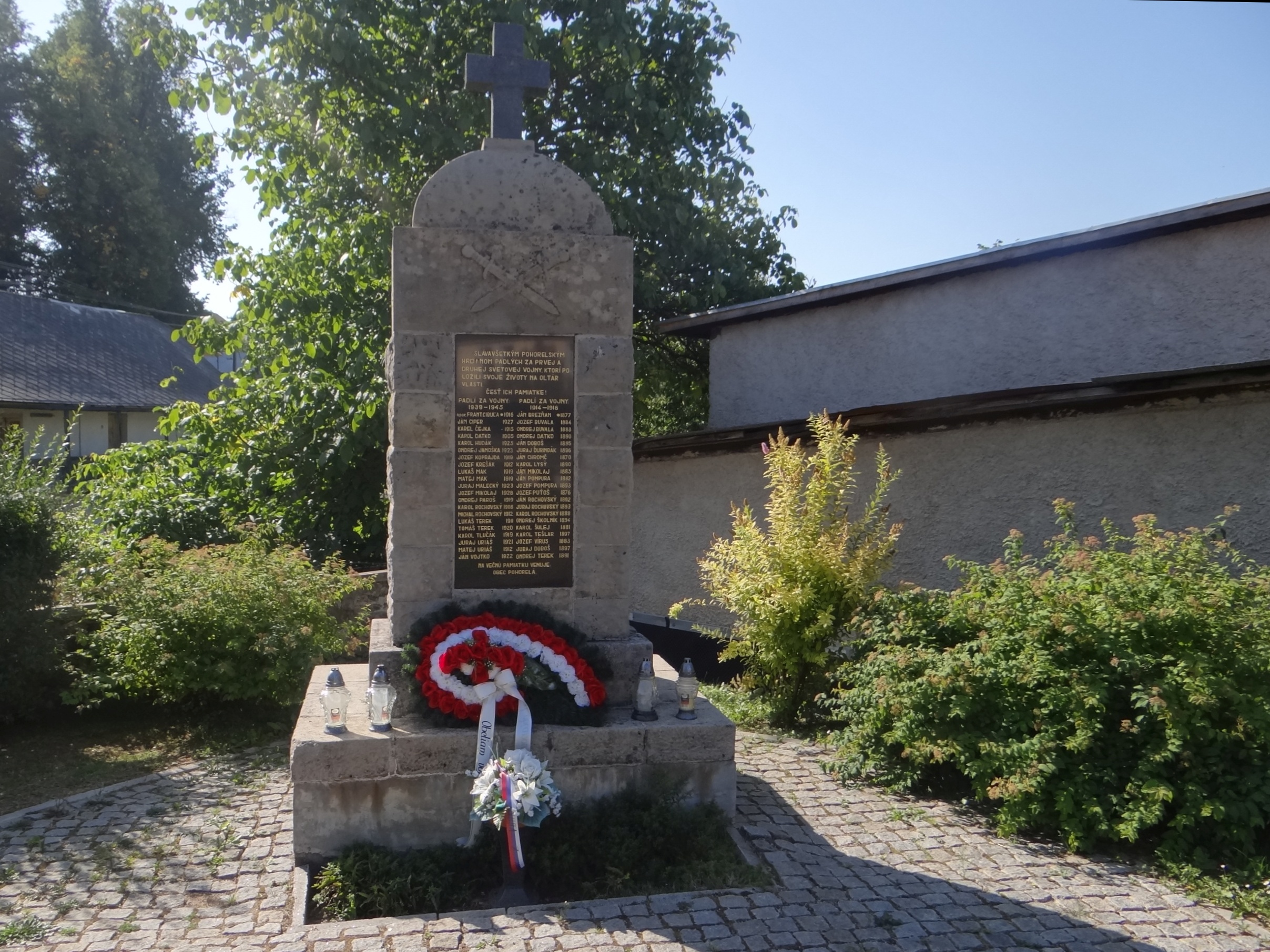
Village monument to fallen soldiers of the First & Second World Wars

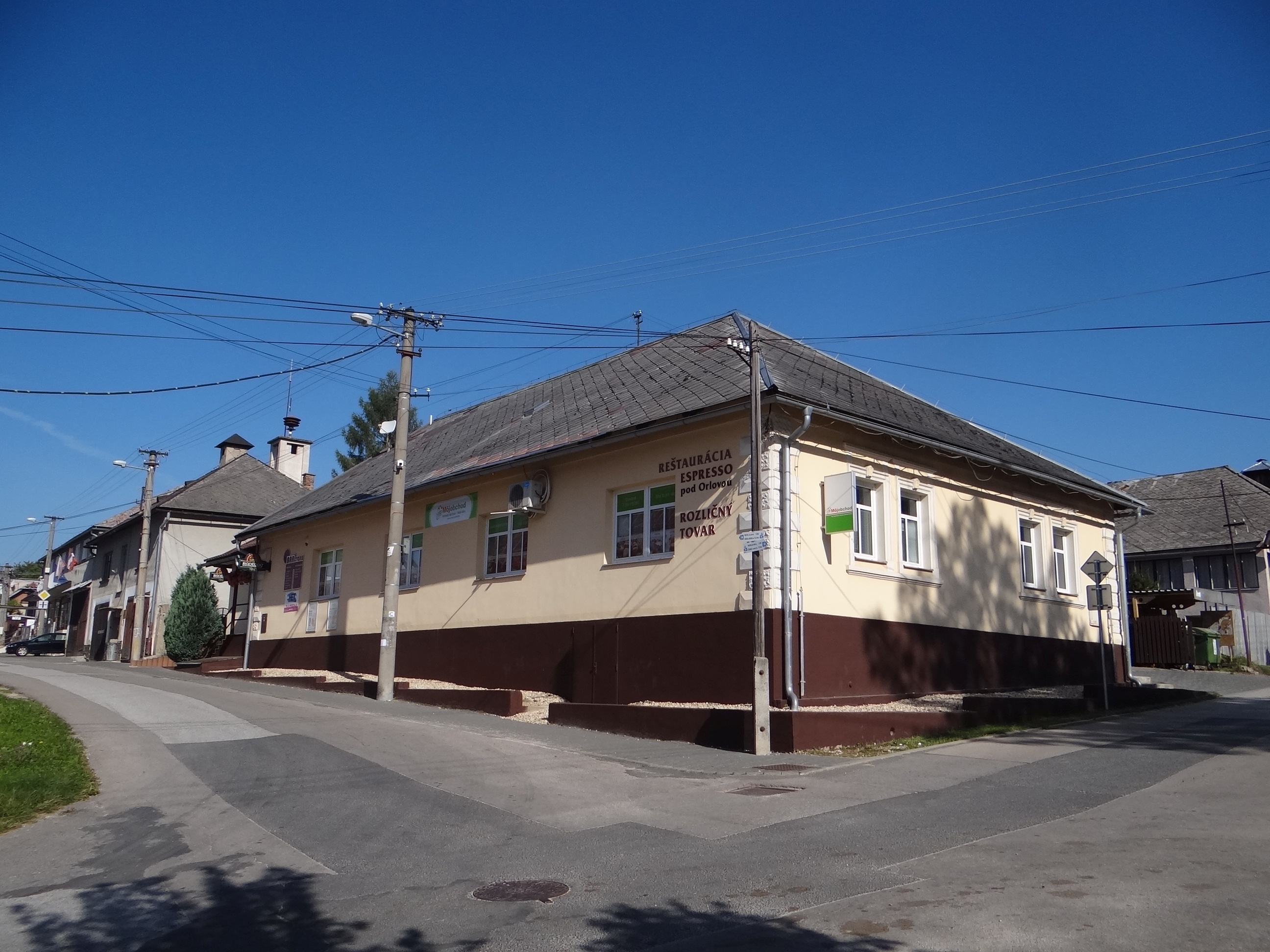
"Centrum"

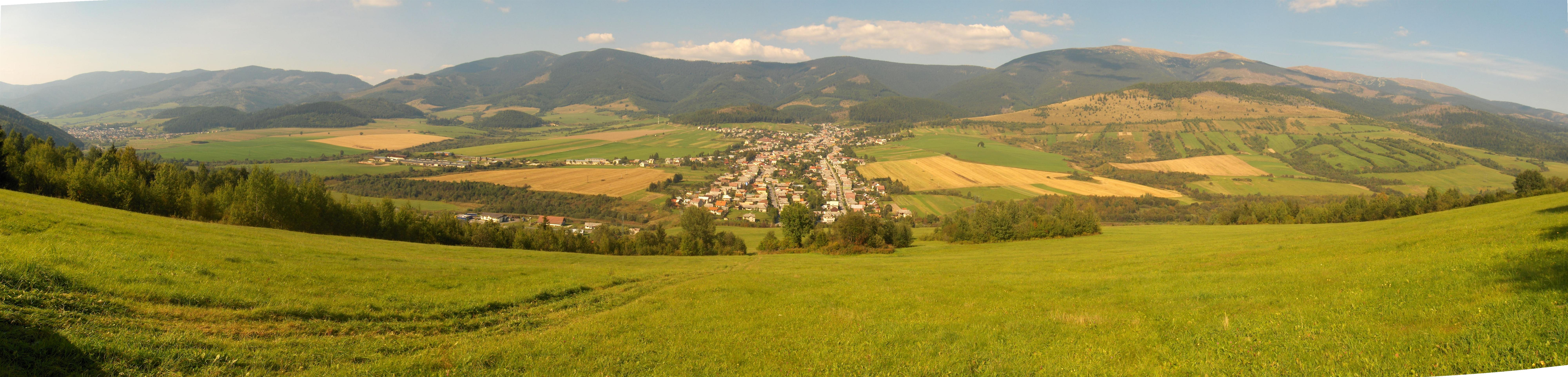
Pohorelá

== Climate ==
The climate in this area is characterized by warm summers and generally cold winters. According to the Köppen climate classification system, the Pohorelá area has a humid continental climate, abbreviated "Dfb" on climate maps.
