= Market in Banská Bystrica =

1889 painting by Dominik Skutecký

- Trh v Banskej Bystrici (Slovak), Пазар в Банска Бистрица (Bulgarian)
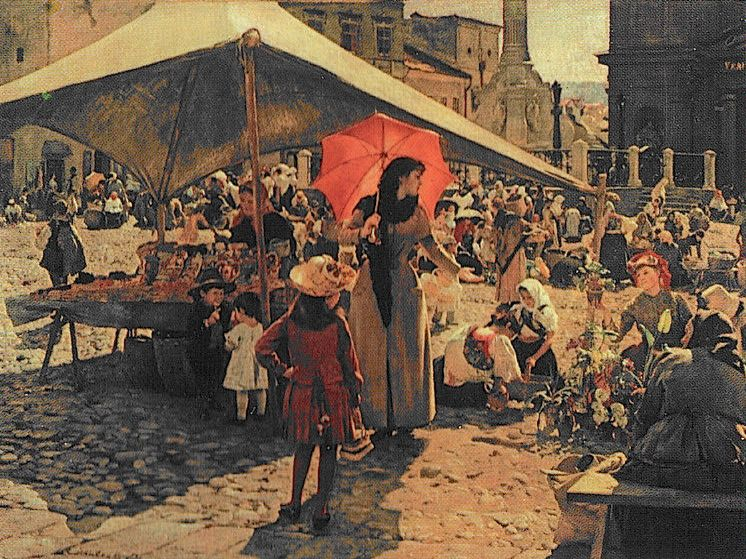
- Artist: Dominik Skutecký
- Year: 1889
- Medium: oil on canvas
- Subject: A market in Slovakia
- Dimensions: 83.3 cm × 113.5 cm (32.8 in × 44.7 in)
- Location: Slovak National Gallery; Bratislava

Market in Banská Bystrica (Slovak: Trh v Banskej Bystrici) is an 1889 painting by the Slovak artist Dominik Skutecký.

== Description ==
The picture is painted with oil paints and measures 83.3 × 113.5 cm. It is part of the collection of the Slovak National Gallery in Bratislava. The painting is currently exhibited in the freshly renovated villa of Dominik Skutecký in Banská Bystrica, which is part of Central Slovak Gallery in Banská Bystrica.

== Analysis ==
This is the most famous painting by Dominik Skutecký. The attitude of the artist's painting is formed mainly under the influence of Italian art. He lived in Venice 1879–1889, with few interruptions. What he learned in Italy is well-expressed in this painting. The picture depicts a market in Banska Bystrica. Extremely important in this work is the light that radiates optimism, good atmosphere and mood. After 1900, he painted the market in Banská Bystrica again, but the later painting has more spots and shadows.
