= Vratislav Greško =

Slovak footballer

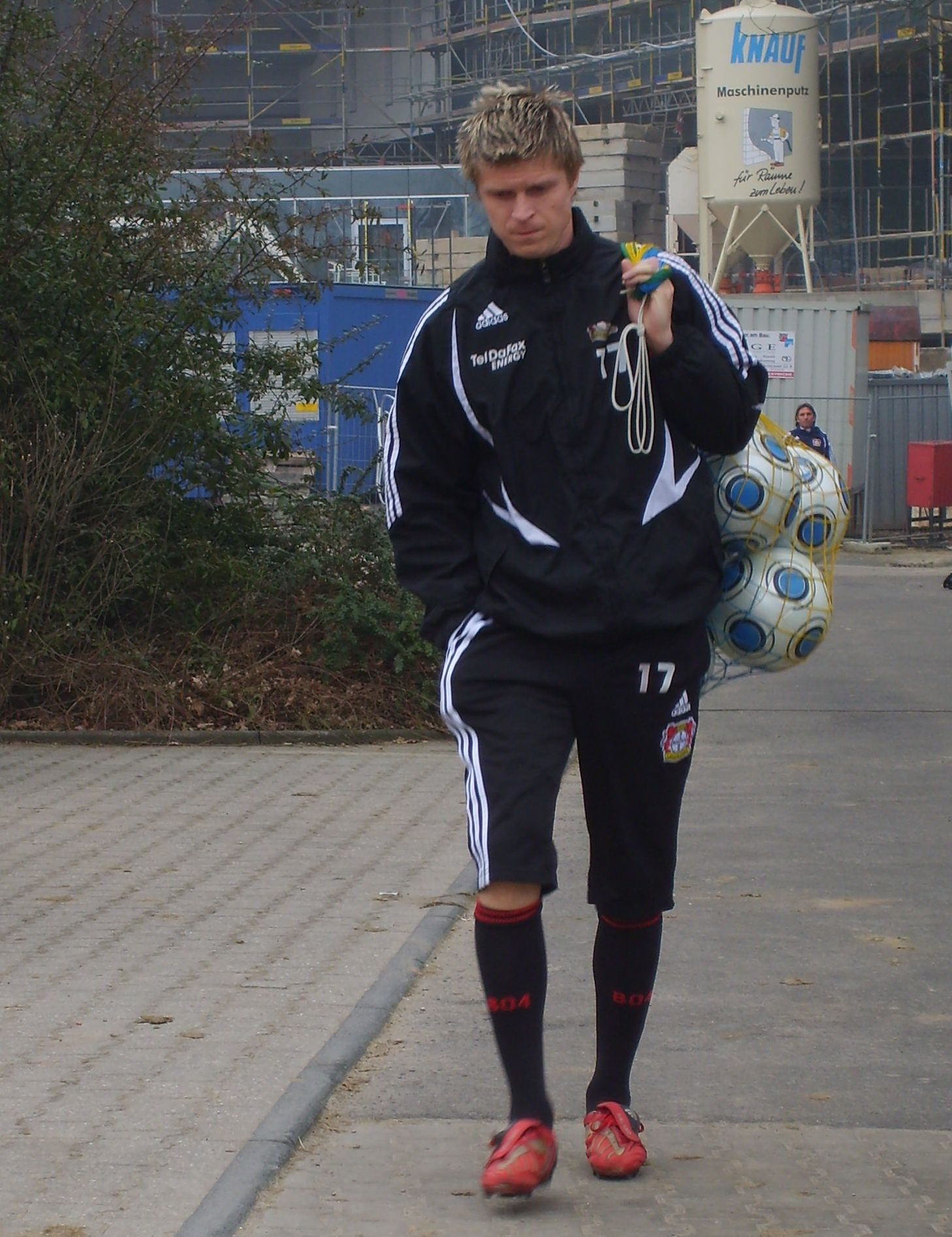
- Greško with Bayer Leverkusen in 2009

Personal information
- Full name: Vratislav Greško
- Date of birth: 24 July 1977 (age 49)
- Place of birth: Tajov, Czechoslovakia
- Height: 1.83 m (6 ft 0 in)
- Position: Left back

Youth career
- Dukla Banská Bystrica

Senior career*
Years	Team	Apps	(Gls)
1995–1997	Dukla Banská Bystrica	8	(0)
1997–1999	Inter Bratislava	51	(5)
1999–2000	Bayer Leverkusen	15	(0)
2000–2002	Inter Milan	41	(0)
2002–2003	Parma	5	(0)
2003	→ Blackburn Rovers (loan)	10	(0)
2003–2006	Blackburn Rovers	30	(2)
2006–2007	1. FC Nürnberg	15	(1)
2007–2009	Bayer Leverkusen	21	(0)
2011–2015	ŽP Šport Podbrezová	118	(7)
Total		314	(15)

International career
2000–2007	Slovakia	34	(2)
- * Club domestic league appearances and goals

Vratislav Greško (born 24 July 1977) is a Slovak former footballer. His preferred position was left-back. He was an attacking full-back widely known for his crossing ability.

== Club career ==
=== Early career ===
Greško began his career at Dukla Banská Bystrica in 1995, before he was signed by Inter Bratislava in 1997 where he played until 1999.

=== Bayer Leverkusen ===
He moved to Bayer Leverkusen in 1999.

=== Move to Internazionale and Parma ===
In October 2000, he signed a four–year contract with Internazionale for a fee of €4.857 million (exactly 9.5 million Deutsche Mark), which media reported a difference figure from 9 billion lire (€4.65 million) to 14 billion lire (€7.23 million) Greško was the first Slovak who ever played for Inter. He made his league debut on 1 November 2000 in a 2–0 victory against Roma. On 5 May 2002, during the last week of the 2001–02 season, Greško headed the ball to Karel Poborský, allowing him to score in a 2–4 defeat against Lazio. After the match, he was heavily criticised for the error, which led to Inter losing the scudetto. His performance at Inter Milan was "firm" and "erratic". He spent only eighteen months between November 2000 and June 2002, making a total of 41 league appearances.

A swap deal was also made between Internazionale and Parma in June 2002, which saw Greško make a switch for Matías Almeyda, both players were tagged for €16 million The deal was criticized as a financial success than a good deal for the team performance. He was out of favour at his next club, Parma, he made just two full appearances during the 2002–03 season.

=== Blackburn Rovers ===
Meanwhile, Blackburn Rovers manager Graeme Souness was looking for left-sided defensive cover. Greško, who initially played on loan to Blackburn for four months (January–May 2003) was given a full contract in August. He scored twice in his first permanent season at Blackburn, with goals against Tottenham Hotspur and Bolton Wanderers.

During the 2004–05 campaign, he suffered a cruciate ligament damage in December which led to him not playing for the rest of the season. He then did not make a single appearance during the 2005–06 season, and was released when his contract expired in July. Not only this season was over for him, even during the following season, he struggled with form and persistent symptoms.

=== Move to Nürnberg and return to Bayer Leverkusen ===
In 2006, he moved to 1. FC Nürnberg, joining his Slovak teammates Róbert Vittek and Marek Mintál. In September 2006, Greško signed there in the light of his injury a strong performance-based one-year contract. In October 2006, he made his Bundesliga debut as a substitute. Overall in the 2006–07 season, he started in 15 matches in the Bundesliga, scoring one goal.

In July 2007, Greško returned to Bayer Leverkusen as a free agent on a two-year contract after nearly seven years. In June 2009, Bayer Leverkusen announced that Greško would leave the club.

=== ŽP ŠPORT Podbrezová ===
In March 2011, he joined Slovak club ŽP ŠPORT Podbrezová (promoted to the second league 2011–12 – the second highest team event in Slovakia), Where he received a one-year contract in July 2011. On 14 June 2015, he announced end of professional career.

== International career ==
Greško appeared 34 times for the Slovak national team, scoring two goals. He scored his first goal in the A-team on 14 May 2002 in the friendly against Uzbekistan.

== Career statistics ==
=== International ===
Appearances and goals by national team and year
National team	Year	Apps	Goals
Slovakia	2000	1	0
Slovakia	2001	11	0
Slovakia	2002	4	1
Slovakia	2003	–	
Slovakia	2004	8	1
Slovakia	2005	5	0
Slovakia	2006	–	
Slovakia	2007	5	0
Total		34	2

Scores and results list Slovakia's goal tally first, score column indicates score after each Greško goal.

List of international goals scored by Vratislav Greško
No.	Date	Venue	Opponent	Score	Result	Competition
1.	14 May 2002	Štadión Prešov, Prešov, Slovakia	Uzbekistan	1–0	4–1	Friendly
2	18 August 2004	Tehelné pole, Bratislava, Slovakia	Luxembourg	2–1	3–1	2006 FIFA World Cup qualification

== Honours ==
1. FC Nürnberg

- DFB-Pokal 2006–07
