= Church of Our Lady of Sorrows, Pohorelá, Slovakia =

Church of Our Lady of Sorrows
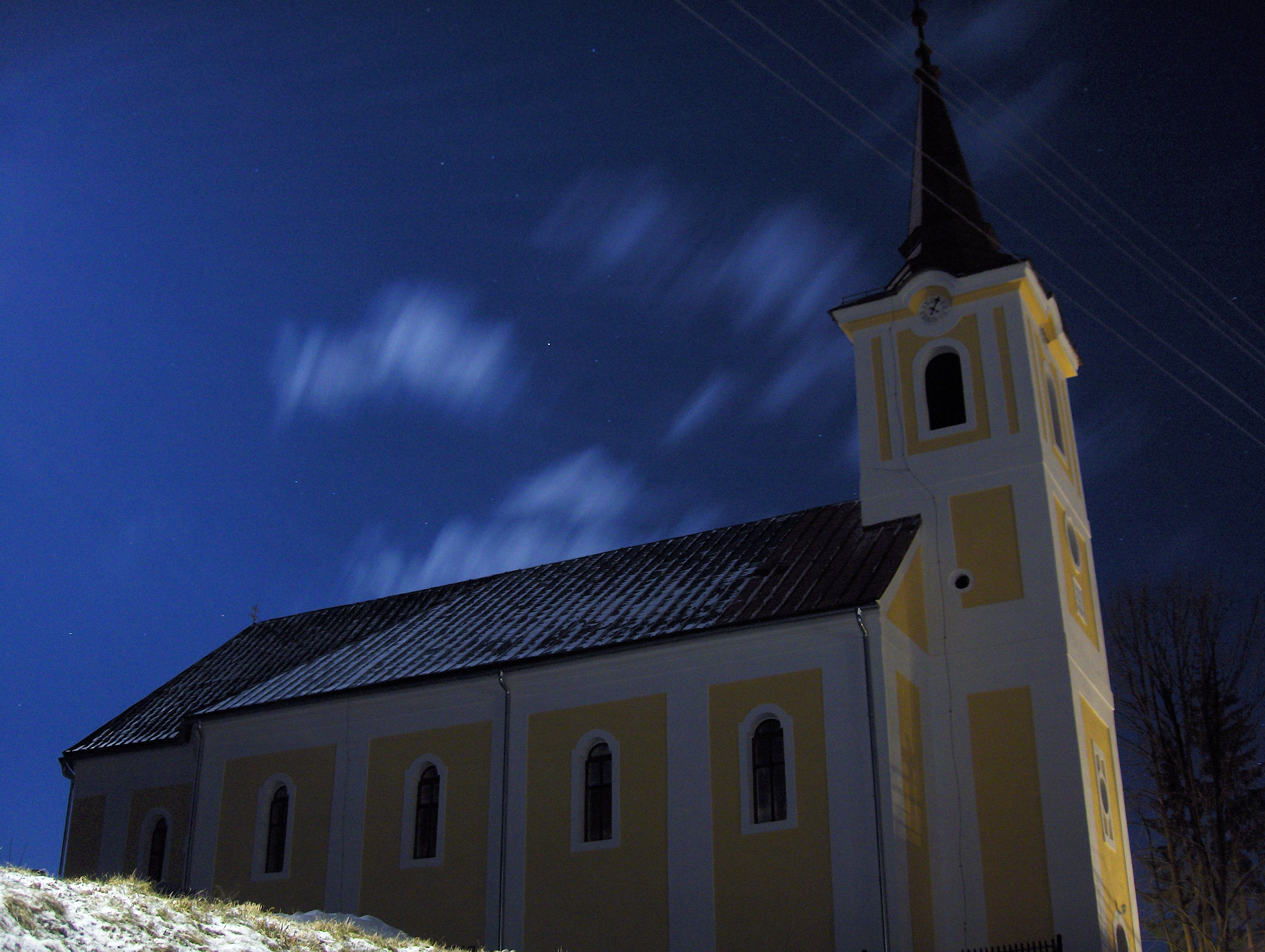
- Side view of the church in moonlight.
- Church of Our Lady of Sorrows
- 48°51′42″N 20°00′59″E
- Location: Pohorelá
- Country: Slovakia
- Denomination: Roman Catholic

Our Lady of Sorrows is a Roman Catholic church in the village of Pohorelá in the Banská Bystrica Region of Slovakia.

== History ==
In the early years of the village there was no church in Pohorelá, only a cemetery with a small wooden chapel next to it. The village was considered part of the parish of Sumiac, about 8 km to the east of the village. Records from 1643 and 1653 show that the villagers were Catholic and were continuously petitioning for their own parish.

A wooden church was built in Pohorelá around 1660. It was built by local craftsmen under direction of Count Ferenc Wesselényi. Wesselenyi was the local governor (Palatine) for Hungary and resident of nearby Muran Castle. The church was dedicated to Saint Stephen I of Hungary.

An attempt by the villagers in 1669 to join the parish of the village of Polomka some 15 km to the west of Pohorelá forced the issue of an independent parish for Pohorelá. With the help of contributions from the nearby village of Helpa a separate parish was declared on 26 January 1669 and the first parish priest appointed. This is also the time when the first parish registers were recorded.

Since the construction of the first wooden church in 1669, a modest wooden parish school has stood adjacent to the rectory. Historical records from 1697 indicate that the school operated with a single schoolmaster, who fulfilled the roles of both director and teacher, receiving compensation from the parish income.

The original parish church was destroyed by fire around 1742 along with the parish register up to that date. Construction of the current brick church began at this time and was completed in the summer of 1768. It stands on the site of the wooden church. It was built with an endowment by Earl Stephan II Koháry (1649–1731), also an occupant of Muran castle.

On 4 May 1883, a great fire broke out destroying nearly all the village. The church was also damaged and was repaired in 1906. The original church was dedicated to Saint Stephen I of Hungary. In 1964 it was re-consecrated to Our Lady of Sorrows, the patron saint of Slovakia.

== Style and interior ==
The church is built in a Romanesque style, with a single-nave. The church contains a picture of St Stephen painted in 1855 by the master artist Vojtech Klimkovics. There is an artistically carved neo-gothic bench of King Ferdinand Coburg in the presbytery. The altar is from the beginning of 20th century. It is decorated with statues of St Elizabeth of Hungary and of St Emeric of Hungary.

The church is built with the traditional Christian nave orientation, with the main altar on the east end and the church tower on the west side. The choir contains an organ built by the Austrian firm of Gebrüder Rieger. The organ was donated around 1910 by King Ferdinand.
