= Jozef Gregor-Tajovský =

Slovak writer, poet, teacher, and politician

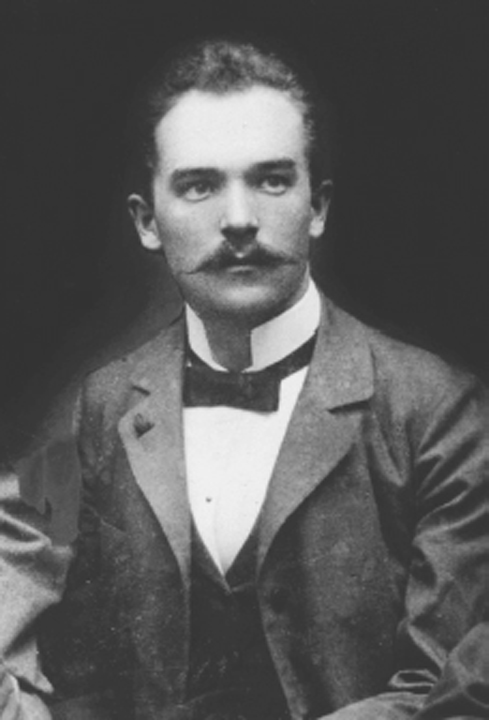
- Born: Jozef Alojz Gregor; 18 October 1874; Tajov, Austria-Hungary
- Died: 20 May 1940 (aged 65); Bratislava, Czechoslovakia
- Occupations: Poet; writer; teacher; politician
- Spouse: Hana Gregorová
- Children: Dagmar Prášilová
- Writing career
- Pen name: Gregor Tajovský; Greško; Grigorievič; Izäslav; Jano z Dohnian; Jozef Slovák; Jozef Spevák; Kaprál; M. Žiarsky; Podsokolovský; Prepáčte
- Language: Slovak
- Period: Realism
- Notable awards: Order of Tomáš Garrigue Masaryk 1992, in memoriam, class I

Jozef Gregor, better known as Jozef Gregor-Tajovský (18 November 1874 – 20 May 1940), was a Slovak novelist, playwright, poet, teacher, and politician. As a novelist, he is considered to be a leading figure of the second wave of Slovak literary realism and as a playwright, he is the founder of Slovak realistic drama. His plays are still part of the core repertoire of Slovak professional theatres, including the Slovak National Theatre, as well as various other domestic and foreign stages.

== Biography ==
=== Early life and studies ===
Gregor was born Jozef Alojz Gregor on 18 October 1874 in the central Slovak village of Tajov (at the time part of the Austro-Hungarian Empire), close to the Kremnica Mountains, the oldest child in a large family. His father was František Alojz Gregor (1849–1922) and his mother Anna Gregorová (nee Grešková, 1853–1925). Tajovský had six brothers and two sisters. One of his brothers, Eduard (1896–1954), became famous as a woodcarver, and several of his pieces are exhibited in the Jozef Gregor-Tajovský memorial house in Tajov.

Gregor attended grade school in Tajov and later went to Banská Bystrica in order to continue his studies. He attended the teacher training institute in Kláštor pod Znievom from 1889 until 1893, and finally studied business in Prague from 1898 until 1900.

=== Teaching, military service, and later life ===
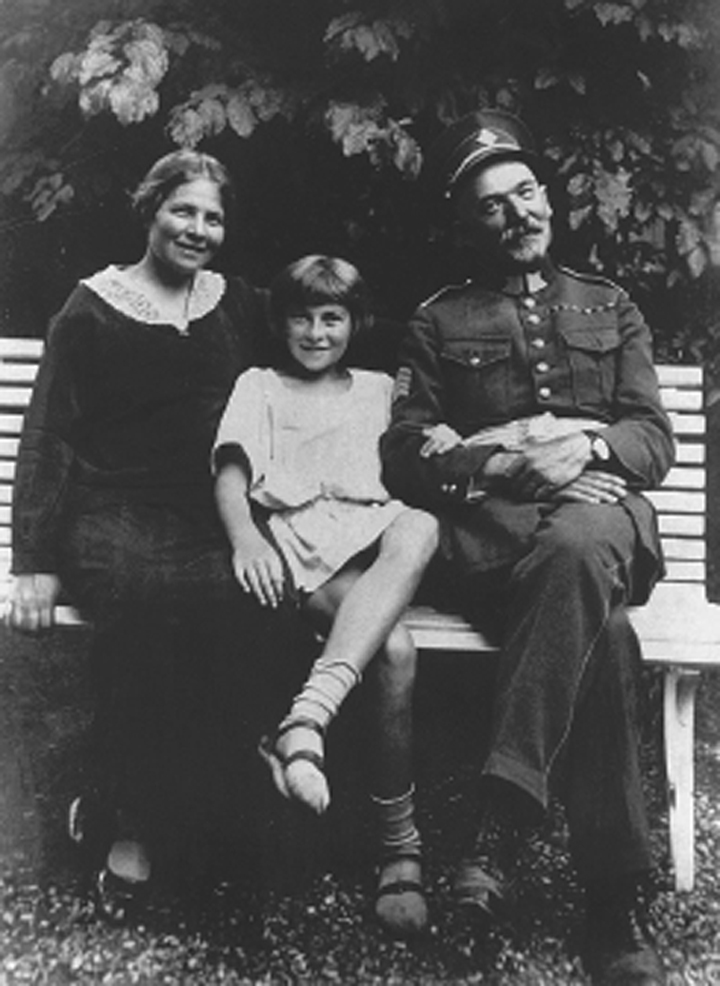
Gregor with his wife Hana Gregorová and their daughter, Dagmar, in 1922

Between 1893 and 1904, Gregor worked as a teacher in Banská Bystrica, Horná Lehota, Brezno District, Kolárovice, Dohňany, Lopej, Pohorelá, and Podlavice. During his later studies in Prague, he became a member of the Detvan academic association, which served as an introduction for him to Czech realists of the time. After graduating from business school, he joined the Rural People's Bank, later the Tatra Bank, but also worked at Ľudové noviny. In 1907, he married Hana Lilgová in Nădlac, Romania.

In 1912, Gregor became secretary of the Slovak National Party in Martin and in 1915, during World War I, he served as the editor of the Slovak Národný hlásnik. In the same year, he was drafted into the army and sent to the Russian front. In 1916, Gregor's wife Hana gave birth to their daughter, Dagmar. In Babruysk in 1917, Gregor joined the Czechoslovak Legion, while working as the editor of Československé Hlasy in Kyiv. He returned to Slovakia in 1920, after the war. After a short stay in Martin, he settled in Bratislava, where he was the head of the legion office. He retired in 1925. Gregor died in Bratislava in 1940, and was buried in his hometown of Tajov. In 1992, he was posthumously awarded the Order of Tomáš Garrigue Masaryk.

== Writing ==
Most of Gregor's stories, initially disseminated through magazines and periodicals, and later collected in various volumes (e.g., Z dedini, Besednice, Smutné nôty), were centred on rural subjects. He often wrote about alcoholism, Magyarization, freedom and political autonomy, family, and social relations.

His work in the theatrical field (e.g., "Ženský zákon", "Nový život", "Statky-zmätky", "V službe", "Hriech", "Tma", "Smrť Ďurka Langsfelda", "Jej prvý román") often also hinged on descriptions of rural environments.

== Legacy ==
- Divadlo Jozefa Gregora Tajovského is a professional theatre in the Slovak city of Zvolen, established on 28 August 1949 under the name Stredoslovenské divadlo and renamed Divadlo Jozefa Gregora Tajovského five years later.
- Gymnázium Jozefa Gregora Tajovského is a gymnasium in Banská Bystrica, Slovakia, established in 1976. Initially called Gymnázium na Tajovského ulici, as it was situated on a street named after Gregor himself, it was renamed in honour of the playwright in 1989.
- Jozef Gregor-Tajovský memorial house, Tajov
- Jozef Gregor Tajovský School Centre, Nădlac, Romania
- Jozef Gregor Tajovský Elementary School, Senec, Slovakia
- Jozef Gregor Tajovský Elementary School, Banská Bystrica

== Selected works ==
=== Writing ===
- Na mylných cestách (1893)
- Čarodejné drevo (1896)
- Starého otca rozpomienky (1896)
- Rozprávky pre ľud (1896/1900)
- Ferko (1897)
- Rozpomienka (1897)
- Omrvinky (1897)
- Z dediny (1897)
- Jastraby (1898)
- Rozprávky (1900)
- Úžerník a iné články (1901)
- Mládenci (1902)
- Maco Mlieč (1903)
- Apoliena (1903)
- Nové časy (1904)
- Besednice (1904)
- Smutné nôty (1907)
- Mamka Pôstková (1908)
- Horký chlieb (1909)
- Na chlieb (1909)
- Mišo (1909)
- Umrel Tomášik (1910)
- Lacná kúpa a predsa draho padla! (1910)
- Spod kosy (1910)
- Tŕpky (1911)
- Jano Mráz (1911)
- Kosec Môcik (1911)
- Slovenské obrázky (1912)
- Výklad programu Slovenskej národnej strany (1914)
- Malý slovenský zemepis (1918)
- Prvý máj (1919)
- Rozprávky z Ruska (1919)
- Na front a iné rozprávky (1920)
- Rozprávky o československých légiách v Rusku (1920)

=== Plays ===
- "Sľuby" (1898)
- "Ženský zákon" (1900)
- "Nový život" (1901)
- "Medveď" (1903)
- "Matka" (1906)
- "Statky-zmätky" (1909)
- "V službe" (1911)
- "Hriech" (1911)
- "Tma" (1912)
- "Tragik z prinútenia" (1915)
- "Jubileum" (1915)
- "Sova Zuza" (1922)
- "Smrť Ďurka Langsfelda" (1923)
- "Jej prvý román" (1930)
- "Blúznivci" (1934)
- "Hrdina" (1938)
