= Tajov =

Tajov Tajó
- Municipality
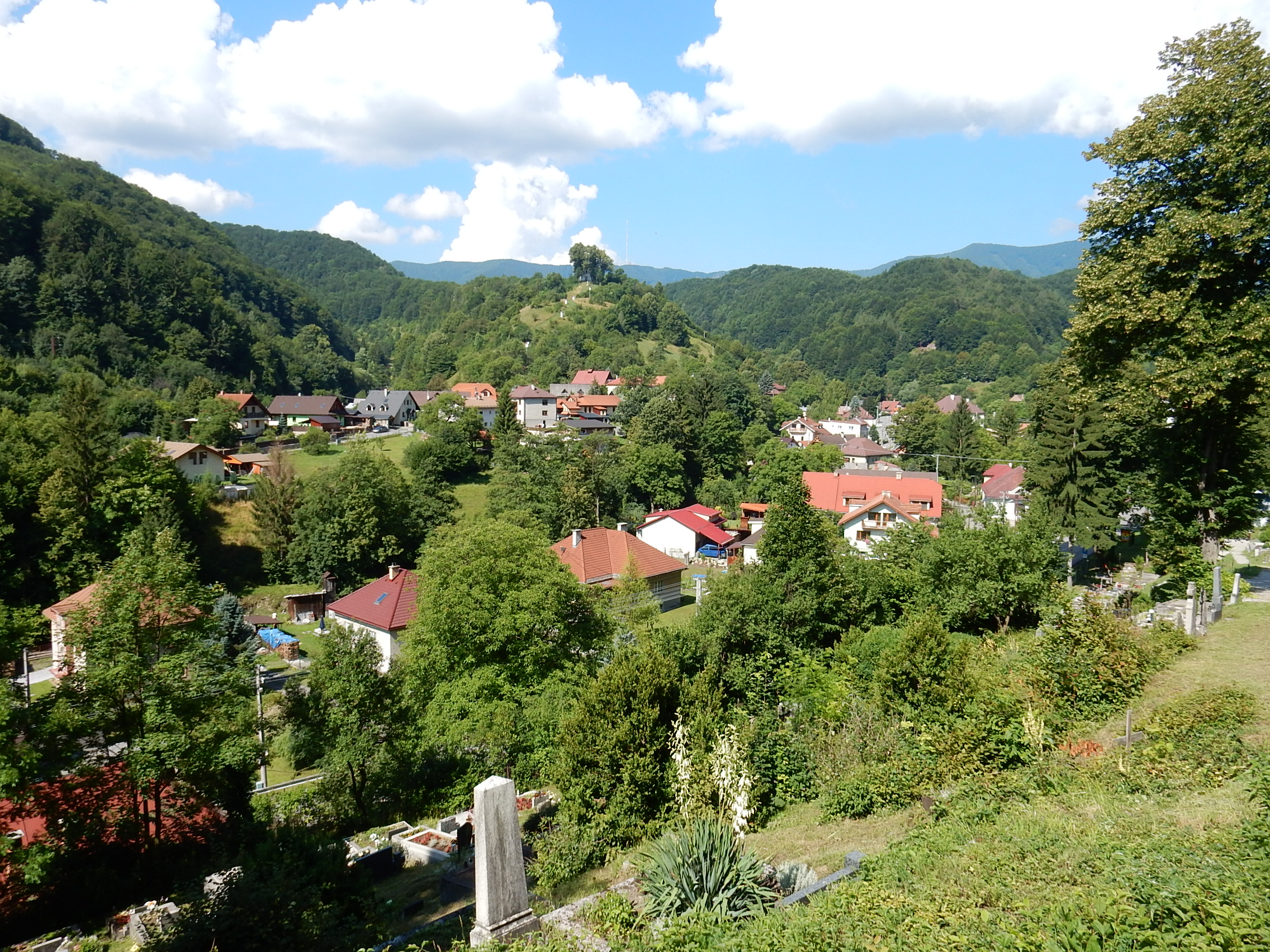

- Flag

- Location of Tajov in the Banská Bystrica Region Location of Tajov in Slovakia
- Coordinates: 48.75°N 19.07°E
- Country: Slovakia
- Region: Banská Bystrica Region
- District: Banská Bystrica District
- First mentioned: 1544

Government
  - Mayor: Ladislav Surovčík

Area
  - Total: 9.28 km^{2} (3.58 sq mi)
- Elevation: 478 m (1,568 ft)

Population (2025)
  - Total: 663
- Time zone: UTC+1 (CET)
  - Summer (DST): UTC+2 (CEST)
- Postal code: 976 34
- Area code: +421 48
- Vehicle registration plate (until 2022): BB
- Website: www.obectajov.sk

Tajov (Hungarian: Tajó) is a village and municipality in Banská Bystrica District in the Banská Bystrica Region of central Slovakia.

== History ==
In historical records the village was first mentioned in 1495.

== Geography ==
The municipality lies at an altitude of 478 metres (1,568 ft) and covers an area of 9.28 km^{2} (3.58 sq mi) (2025). It is situated on outskirts of Banská Bystrica, under the Kremnica Mountains.

== Population ==
Population statistic (10 years)
Year	1995	2005	2015	2025
Count	403	512	619	663
Difference		+27.04%	+20.89%	+7.10%

Population statistic
Year	2024	2025
Count	661	663
Difference		+0.30%

It has a population of 663 people (31 December 2025).

=== Ethnicity ===
Census 2021 (1+ %)
Ethnicity	Number	Fraction
Slovak	645	96.55%
Not found out	9	1.34%
Czech	8	1.19%
Total	668	

In year 2021 was 668 people by ethnicity 645 as Slovak, 9 as Not found out, 8 as Czech, 6 as Other, 4 as German, 3 as Ukrainian, 3 as Canadian, 2 as Russian, 2 as Austrian, 2 as Bulgarian, 1 as Jewish, 1 as Serbian and 1 as Hungarian.

Note on population: The difference values of population numbers in the table "Population statistic" and in the sections "Ethnicity" & "Religion" is caused by the use of various statistical methods.

=== Religion ===
Census 2021 (1+ %)
Religion	Number	Fraction
Roman Catholic Church	360	53.89%
None	243	36.38%
Evangelical Church	26	3.89%
Not found out	20	2.99%
Total	668	

In year 2021 was 668 people by religion 360 from Roman Catholic Church, 243 from None, 26 from Evangelical Church, 20 from Not found out, 5 from Greek Catholic Church, 3 from Other, 2 from Other and not ascertained christian church, 2 from Buddhism, 2 from Baptists Church, 2 from Ad hoc movements, 1 from Jewish community, 1 from Eastern Orthodox Church and 1 from Church of the Brethren.

== Famous people ==
- Vratislav Greško, football player
- Jozef Murgaš, inventor, pioneer of radiotelegraphy
- Jozef Gregor-Tajovský, writer and playwright
