= Hana Gregorová =

Slovak writer and editor

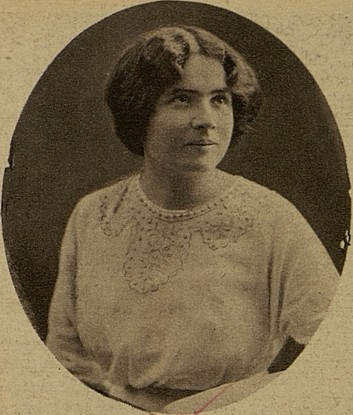
- Born: Anna Božena Lilgová; 30 January 1885; Turócszentmárton, Kingdom of Hungary (now Martin, Slovakia)
- Died: 11 December 1958 (aged 73)
- Occupations: Author and feminist
- Spouse: Jozef Gregor-Tajovský
- Children: Dagmar Prášilová

Hana Gregorová (30 January 1885 – 11 December 1958) was a Slovak author who explored women's lives in realistic terms and often focused on the issues of women's emancipation and inequalities with men.

== Life ==
Hana Gregorová was born Anna Božena Lilgová on 30 January 1885 in Turócszentmárton in the Kingdom of Hungary (now Martin, Slovakia). Largely self-educated, she married the realist writer Jozef Gregor-Tajovský in 1907 and they had a daughter, Dagmar Prášilová, who was born in Budapest in 1916. The family lived in Bratislava, Czechoslovakia, from 1921 until her husband's death in 1940 at which time she moved to Prague, Czech Republic, then part of the German-controlled Protectorate of Bohemia and Moravia, to live with her daughter's family. She died on 11 December 1958.

== Works ==
Gregorová edited the magazine Slovak East (Slovak: Slovenský východ) while the family lived in Košice, Czechoslovakia, from 1919 to 1921. She later organized lectures on Czech and Slovak literature and art for the Society of Artists (Slovak: Umelecká beseda) and addressed the Congress of Slovak Writers in 1936 calling for children's literature to be realistic and not idealized. Gregorová was a member of the Society for Cultural Contacts with the USSR (Slovak: Spoločnosť pre kultúrne styky so Zväzom SSR) and briefly became Chairwoman of the Union of Slovak Women (Slovak: Zväz slovenských žien) after 1945.

From her first book of short stories published in 1912, Women (Slovak: Ženy), Gregorová "revealed a deep empathy with women and a great interest in women’s emancipation. Gregorová explored the lives of women across the spectrum of social classes and generations, protesting against gender and other social inequalities. At the same time, she attempted to describe the inner, emotional lives of her female protagonists, primarily focusing on marriage and partnerships with men and the desire of women for alternatives, for more independent means of living."
