= Dominik Skutecký =

Slovak painter

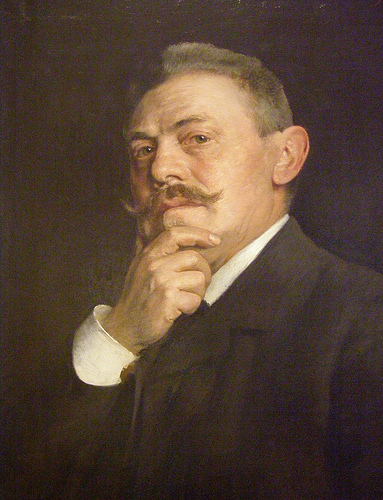
Self-portrait (1888)

Dominik Skutecký (14 February 1849 – 13 March 1921) was a Slovak painter of Jewish ancestry. Alternate forms of his name include David, Domenico, Döme, Skutezky, Skuteczky and Skutetzky. He specialized in landscapes, portraits and genre scenes.

== Biography ==
He was born in Gajary. After his father's death in 1859, his family moved to Vienna, where he began his artistic studies with the sculptor Johann Meixner. He also took private art classes at the Academy of Fine Arts, where he studied with Carl Wurzinger and Karl von Blaas from 1865 to 1867. Upon receiving a scholarship, he continued his studies in Venice from 1867 to 1870, where he worked with the history painter, Pompeo Marino Molmenti at the Accademia di Belle Arti. He also spent a few months at the Academy of Fine Arts, Munich.

After 1873, he was a resident of Vienna, where he was mostly a portrait painter. His first major showing was at the Künstlerhaus in 1875. It was during this time that he met Cecilia Löwy, a model whom he would later marry. During his first stay in Banská Bystrica, from 1884 to 1886, he concentrated on landscapes and genre scenes from the local peasantry. He settled there permanently in 1889 and once more began to produce portraits of the area's notable citizens. He also created numerous paintings of the "Copper Hammer", a copper manufactory that was noted for its progressive management practices. Later, he organized art exhibitions, the largest (120 works) of which took place in 1902.

His works may be seen at the Slovak National Gallery and the Stredoslovenská galéria. Many are in private collections.

His daughter, Karola Skutecká-Karvašová was also a painter and his son, Alexander Skutecký, was a well known architect.

== Selected paintings ==
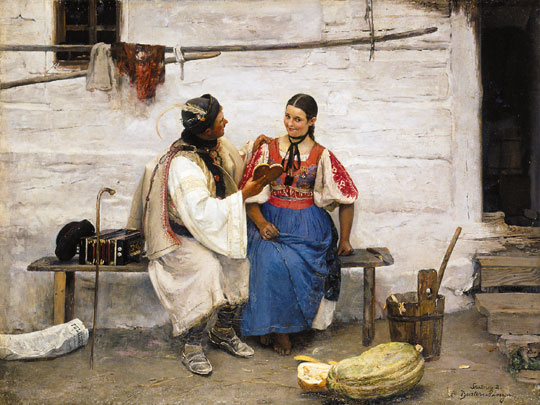
Courting

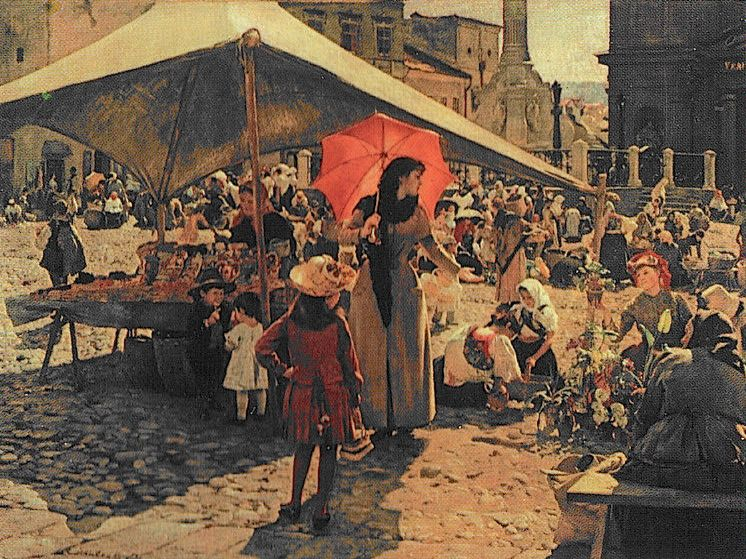
Market in Banska Bystrica

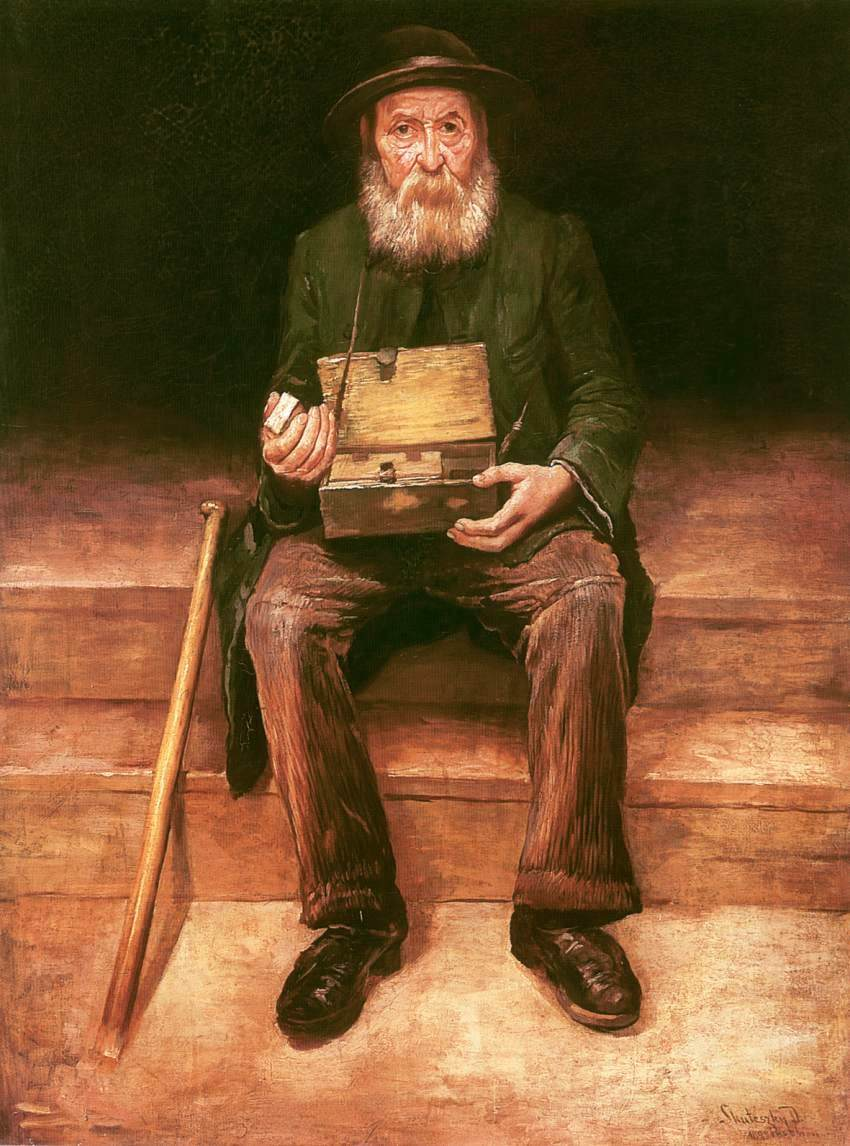
Cigarette Seller

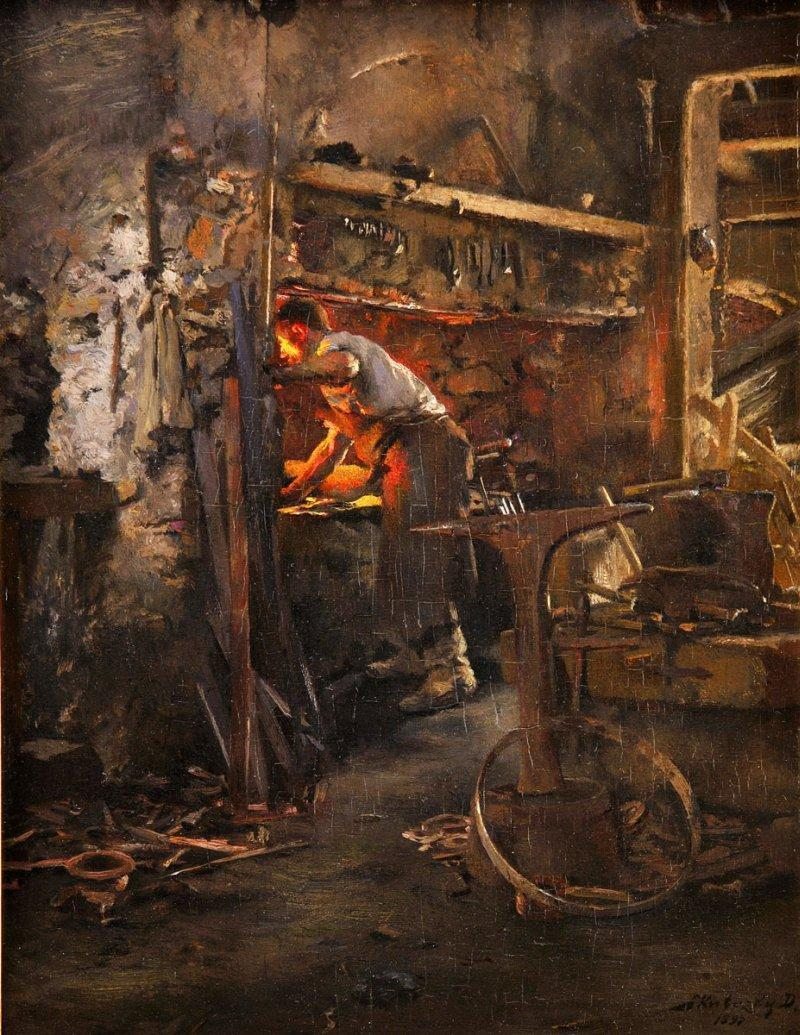
In the
Blacksmith's Shop

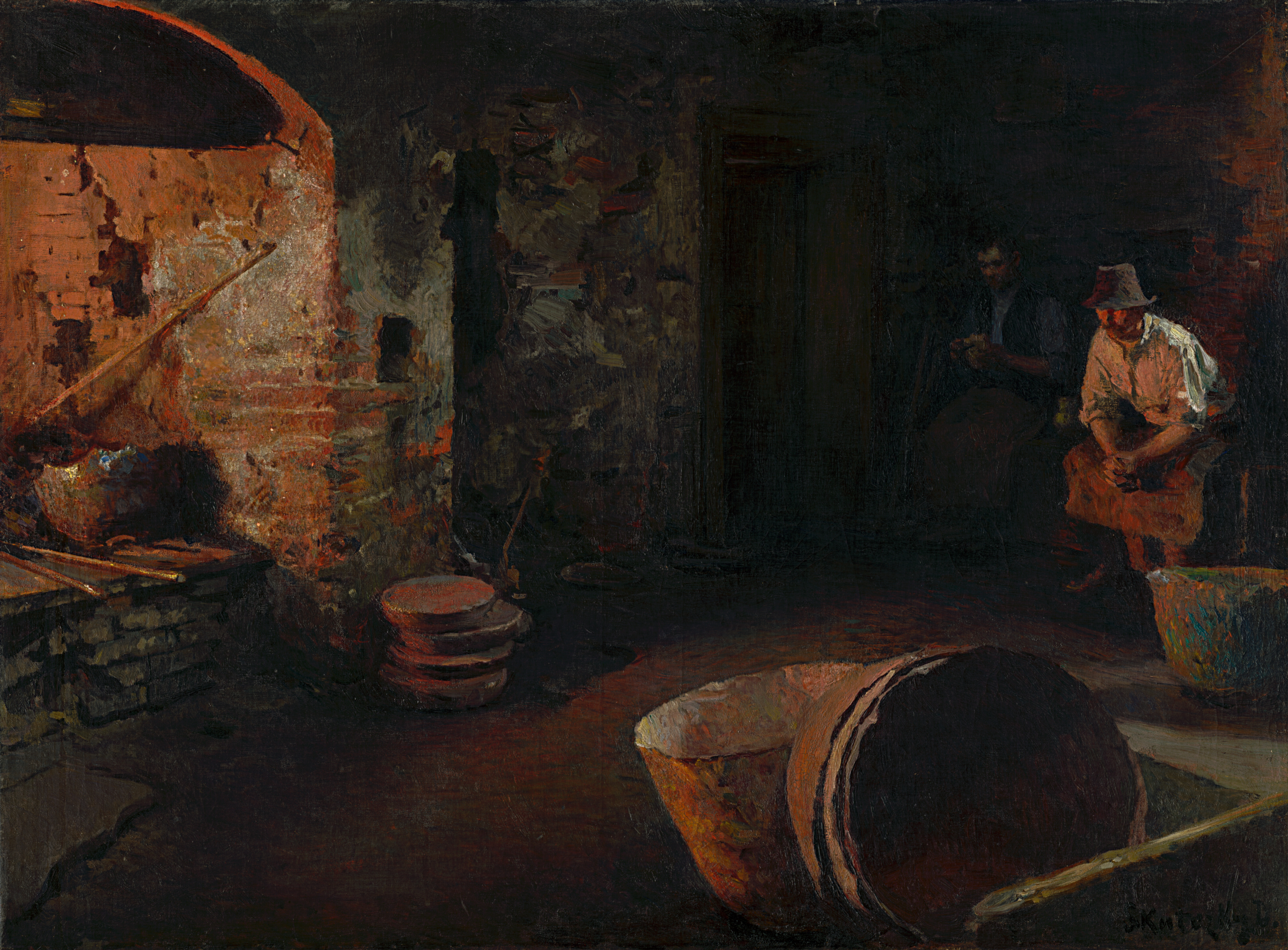
Boilermen, Resting
