= Matica slovenská =

Cultural institution based in Martin, Slovakia

Matica Slovenská
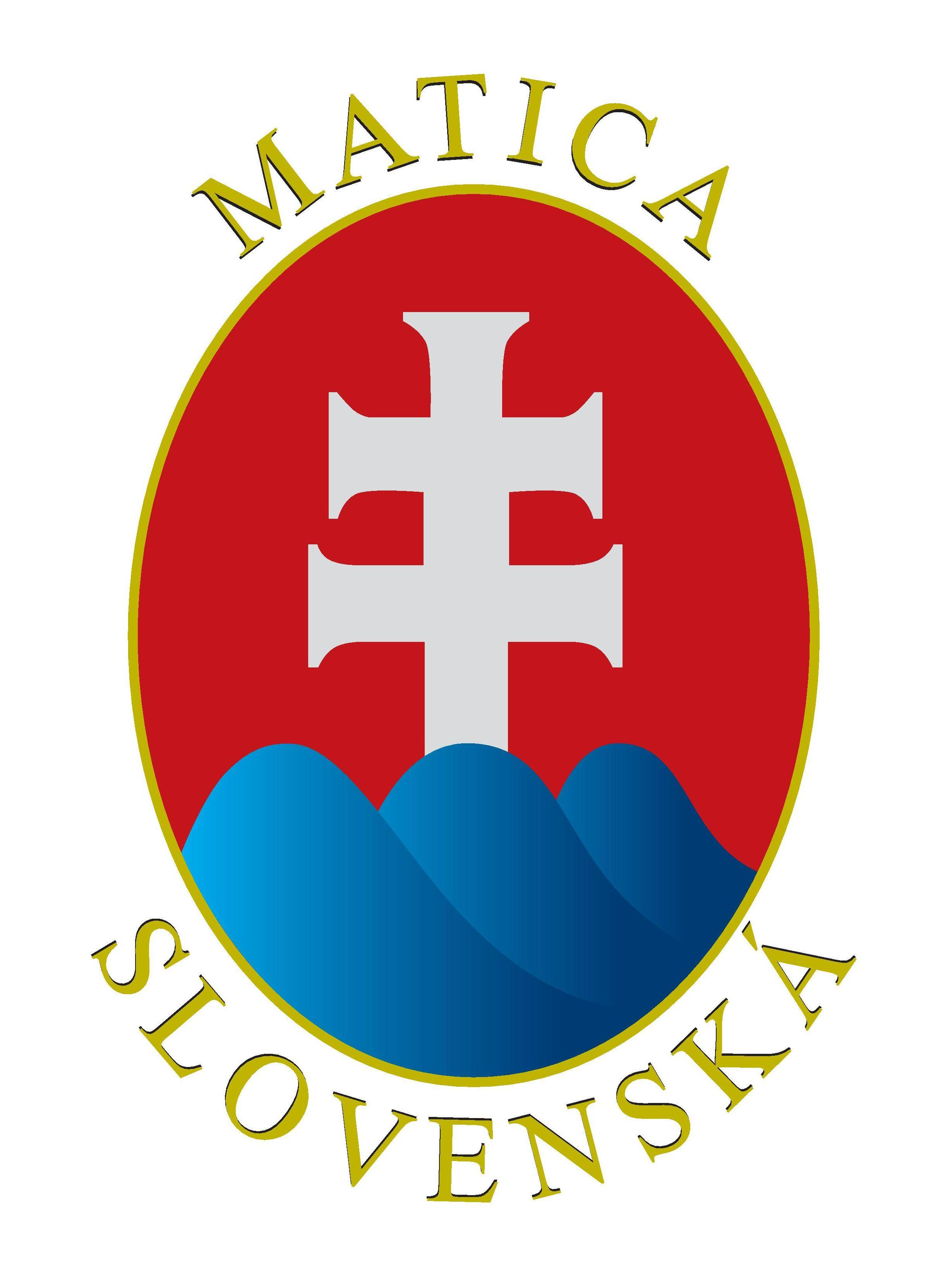

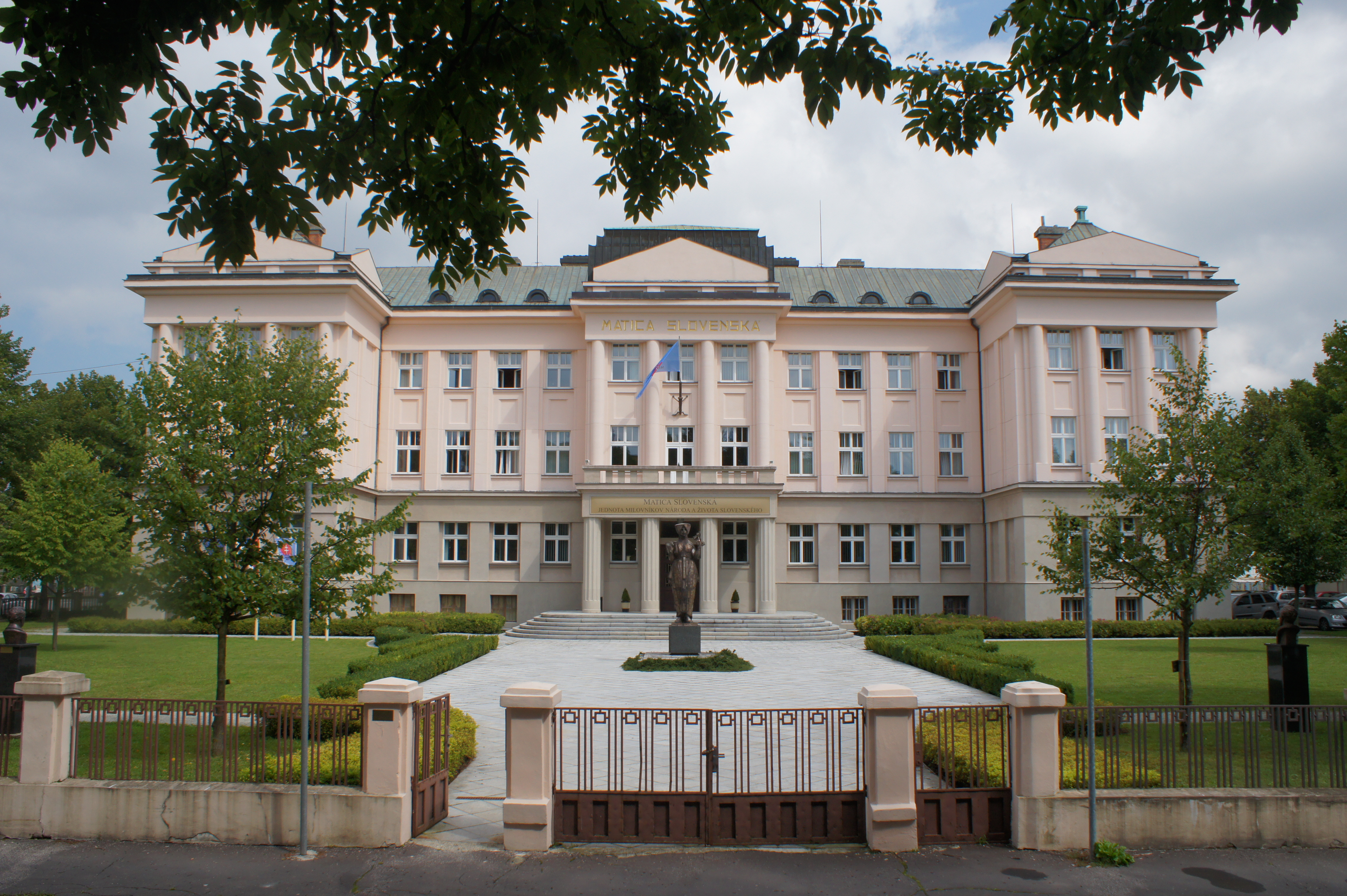
- The seat of Slovak Matica in Martin
- Formation: 1863; 163 years ago
- Type: Public institution
- Legal status: Active
- Purpose: Culture, science, literature, publishing, archiving, librarianship, theater, folklore
- Headquarters: Martin, Slovakia
- Coordinates: 49°04′07″N 18°55′18″E
- Region served: Slovakia
- Official language: Slovak
- President: JUDr. Marián Gešper
- Website: www.matica.sk

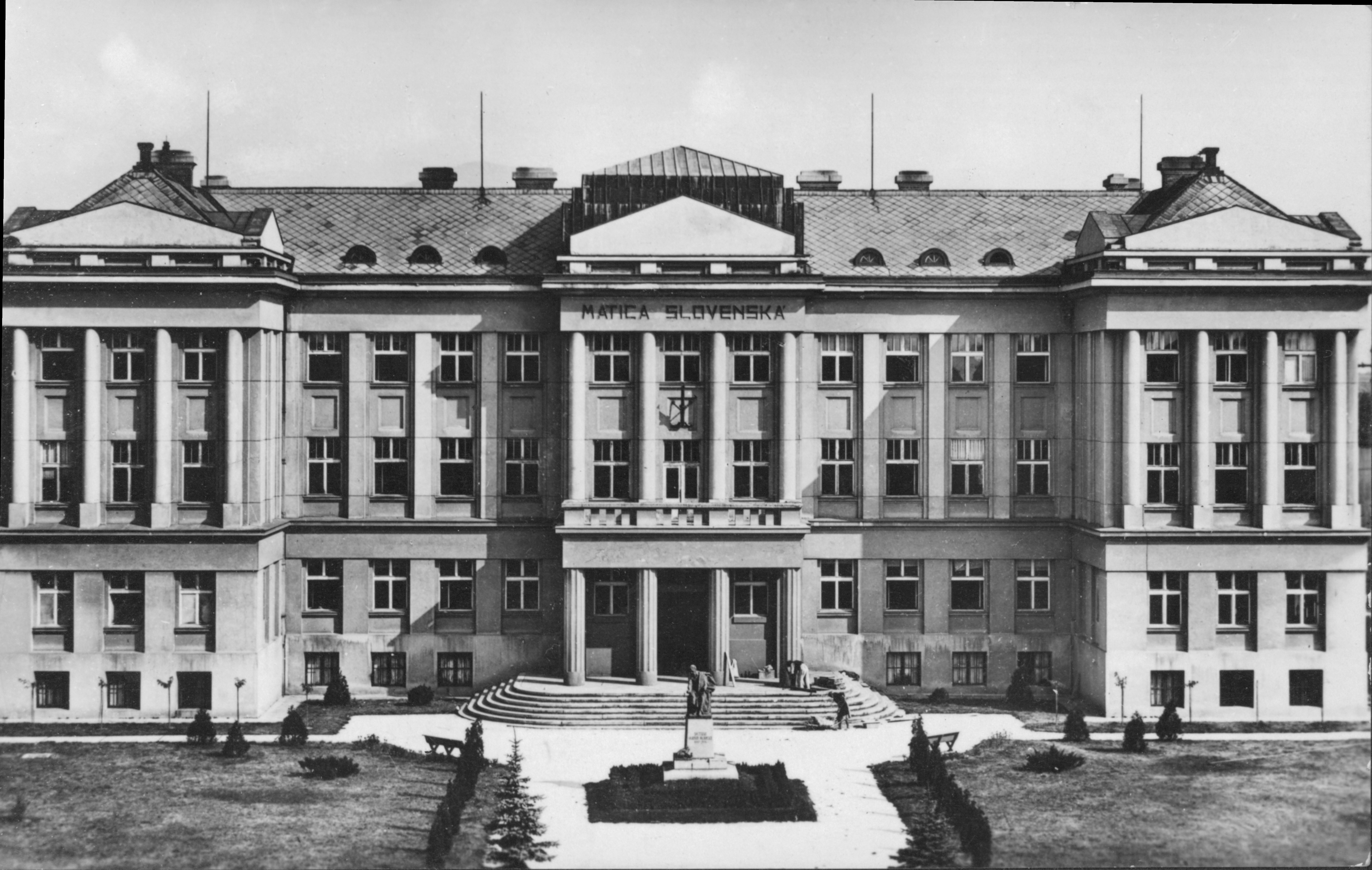
Slovak Matica

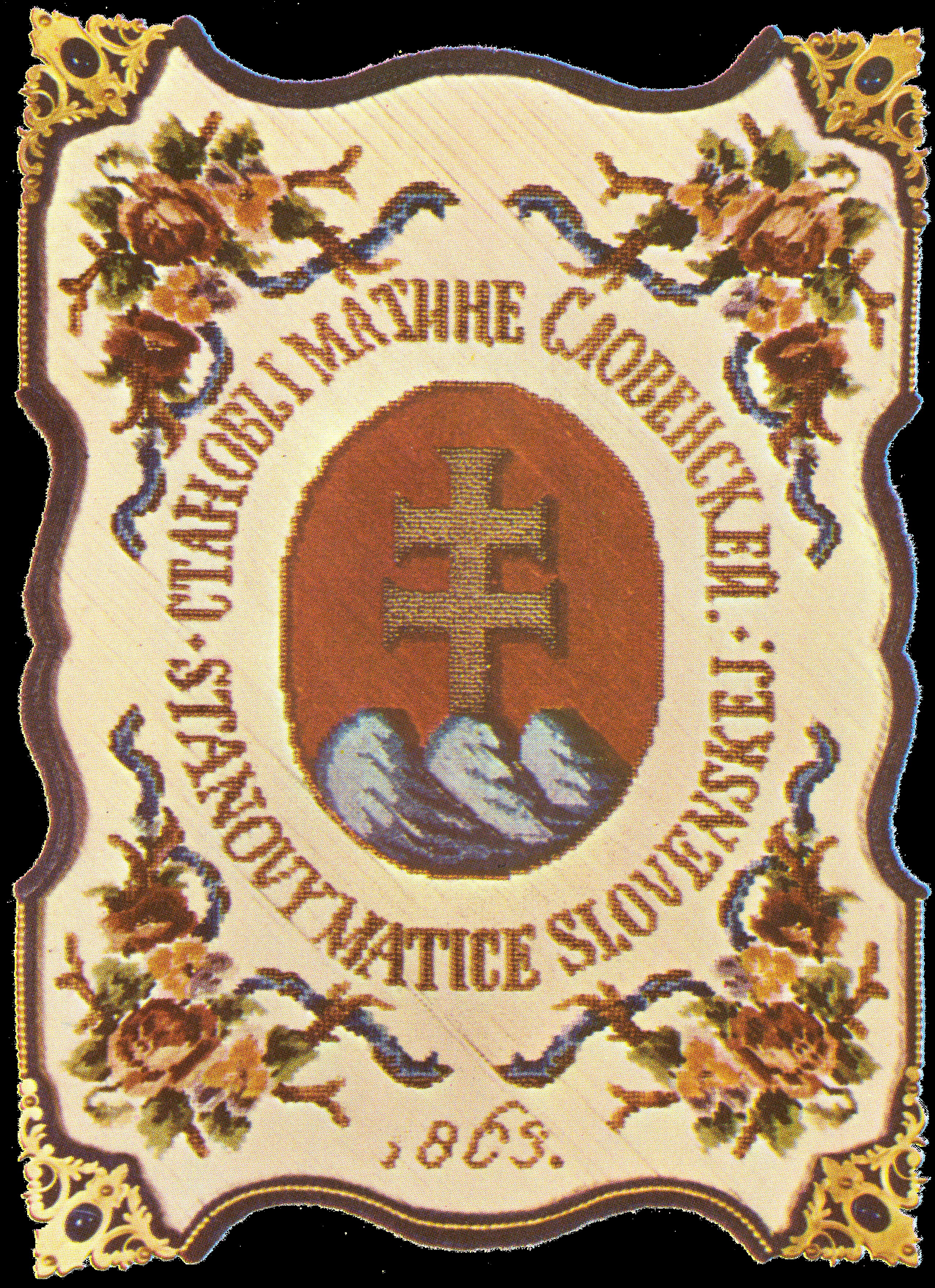
Cover of the first statutes of Matica Slovenská from 1863

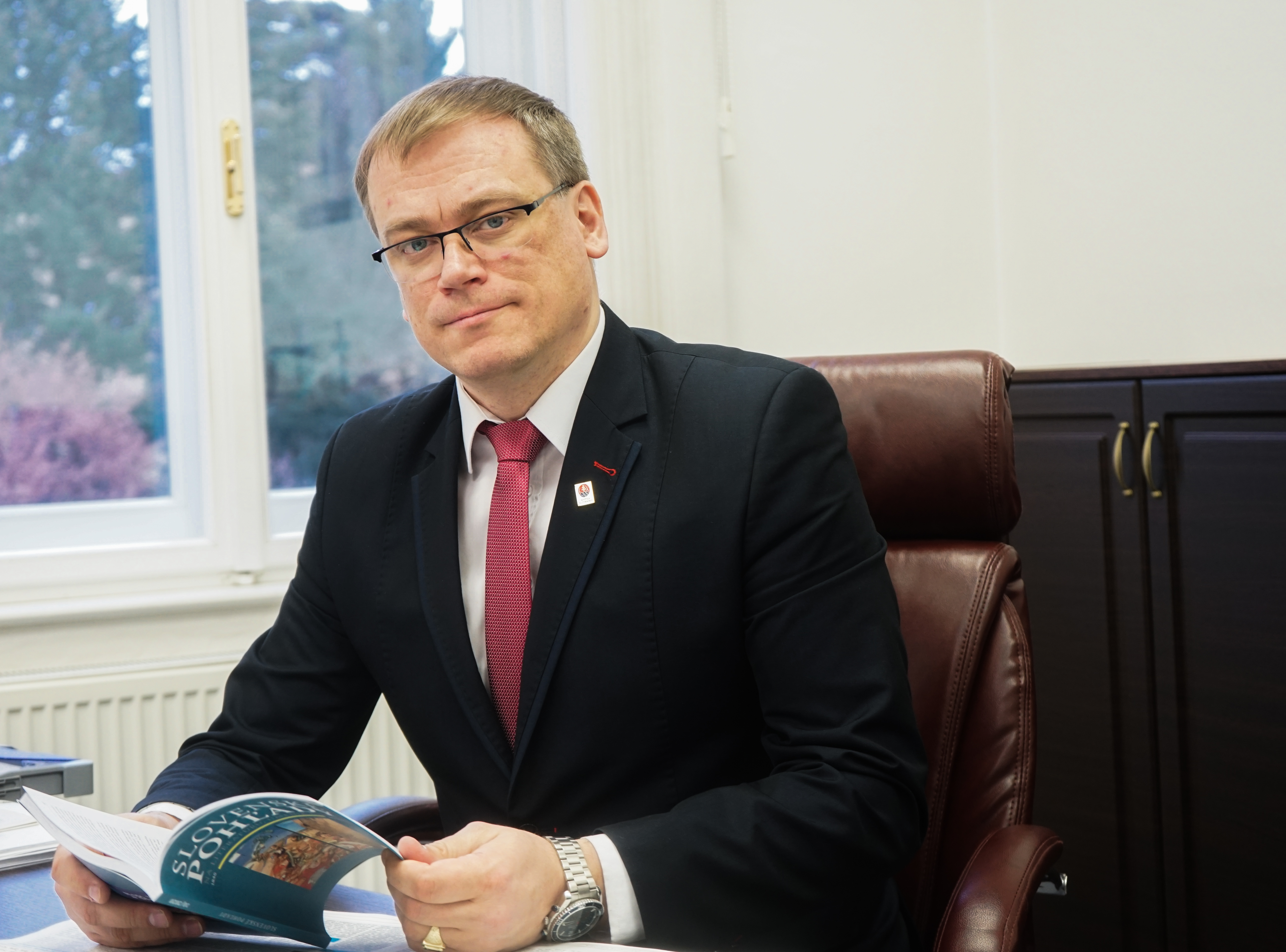
Marián Gešper, chairman of Slovak Matica

Matica Slovenská (en. Slovak Matica) is the oldest Slovak national, cultural and scientific organization. The headquarters of Slovak Matica is the town of Martin, Slovakia as the center of the national culture of Slovaks, where it was founded in 1863 and revived in 1919. Slovak Matica is a public institution that operates as a national scientific and cultural centre. It has facilities both in the Slovak Republic and abroad. Slovak Matica works to develop and protect the national rights, identity, and development of Slovak culture and the Slovak nation. Slovak Matica is a legal entity. It establishes its organizational units on the territory of the Slovak Republic as well as abroad. The position and activity of Slovak Matica is regulated by Act no. 68/1997 Coll. on the Slovak Matica as amended and the Statutes of Slovak Matica.

Slovak Matica events in 2022

== Focus and mission of Slovak Matica ==
Slovak Matica is a public institution. It operates as a national, independent non-partisanship, supra-confessional, supra-departmental, scientific and cultural institution. Slovak Matica played an irreplaceable role in the process of national self-determination and protection of national rights, preservation of identity and development of the culture of the Slovak nation. The mission of Slovak Matica in the 21st century is to systematically develop the spiritual, national, cultural and social life of all members of the Slovak nation, as well as other fellow citizens living in the Slovak Republic. Slovak Matica develops and consolidates the national cultural life of the Slovak nation, its national awareness and educational level, while ensuring the creation and protection of cultural heritage and traditions. It establishes cooperation with members of nationalities living in the territory of the Slovak Republic, as well as with other nations abroad with the aim of learning about and exchanging cultural values.

Slovak Matic also participates in the development of Slovak science, culture, art and education and all forms of spiritual and social life that strengthen national self-awareness, especially in the ranks of the Slovak intelligents´, students and youth. It maintains and develops special cooperation with maticas of Slavic nations and Slovak Maticas operating outside the territory of Slovakia.

== Objectives of the Slovak Matica ==
The main tasks entrusted to the Slovak Matica by the state and defined in the Act on the Slovak Matica include in particular: consolidating Slovak patriotism; to deepen the relationship of citizens to the Slovak statehood; to do basic Slovak research; to participate in the development of local and regional culture; to work in particular on young people in the spirit of national, moral and democratic values; to increase the national awareness of Slovaks in the linguistically mixed territories of the Slovak Republic; to strengthen the relations of the cultures of citizens who declare themselves to national minorities and ethnic groups in the territory of the Slovak Republic with the Slovak national culture; to bring together creators and supporters of Slovak culture and science in the world; to support the promotion of the Slovak Republic also through its own information and cultural centers set up abroad; to develop contacts with European and world organizations on issues of culture, national identity, spiritual life and the protection of human values; to establish foundations and funds at home and abroad to support the national and cultural life of Slovaks and to reward the most important creators from defined areas of creative activity; to cooperate with state authorities and with local self-government bodies in the development of culture and social life; to publish original Slovak works of art, scientific works, educational and popular-scientific works, journalism and periodicals; to promote Slovak history, culture and personalities through original audiovisual documentaries, as well as to produce cultural news about its activities through electronic media and internet databases; to co-operate in the creation of textbooks and textbooks of certain subjects of social sciences for primary and secondary schools on the basis of the authorization of the Ministry of Education of the Slovak Republic.

== Departments ==
- Archive
- Member headquarters
- Financial and economic department
- Information department
- Compatriot Museum
- Matica slovenská Regional Centers (Matice slovenskej Houses and Matice slovenskej Regional Offices) Wardrobe
- Editorial staff of the Slovak National Newspaper
- Editorial staff of Slovak Views (Slovenské pohľady)
- Secretariat of the chairman and Administrator
- Slovak Historical Institute
- Slovak Literary Institute
- Center for National Relations
- Technical and investment department
- Science Headquarters
- Publishing house

== Headquarters ==
=== First building ===
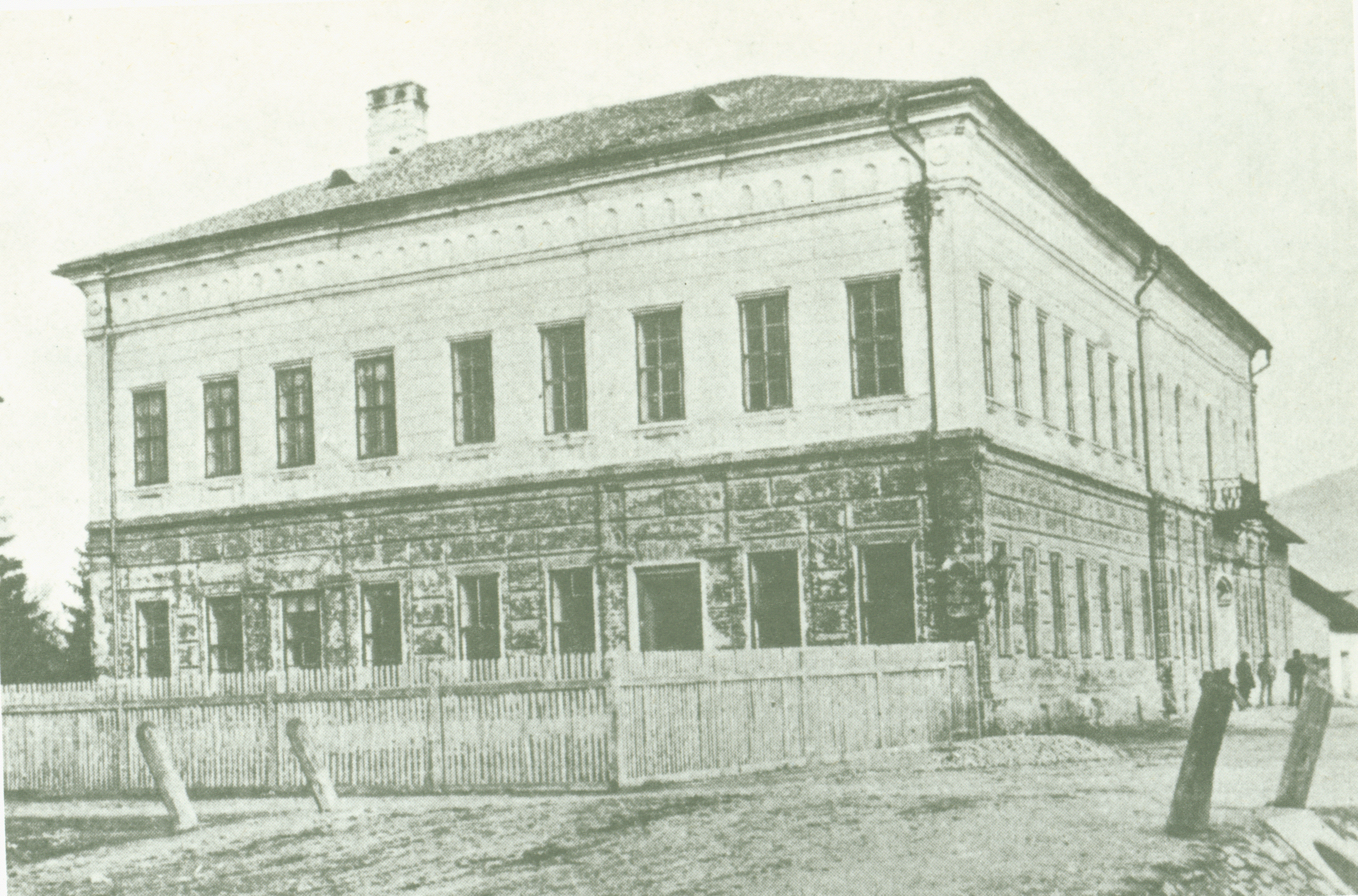
The first building of Slovak Matica in Martin

The first historical residential building of Slovak Matica is called Národná svetlica (National flare). Its construction began in 1864 and the project was run by Karol Harrer and supported by Ján Nepomuk Bobula, to whom Harrer entrusted the construction of the property. The foundation stone in the center of Martin was laid on April 6, 1864, and its solemn tapping was performed by the then acting first vice-chairman of the Slovak Matica, Karol Kuzmány, an Evangelical priest and superintendent. The partially completed building was ceremoniously opened on August 8, 1865, as the House of the Slovak Matica and its second stage of construction was completed in 1869. In 1875, it was confiscated by Hungarian state and became property of FEMKE. The building was completed between 1899 and 1900. However, it got simultaneously adapted exclusively for the administrative needs of the Hungarian state authorities. After the revival of Slovak Matica on Jan. 1, 1919, the original seat was restored by the Czechoslovak government through the Ministry with a power of attorney for the administration of Slovakia. The Czechoslovak state authorities operated in it this time, and the capacity development plan of the maticas association was not sufficient. In August 1919, the idea arose to build a new, larger and more modern Maticas building, which came true in 1926, when the first historic building ceased to be the seat of the Slovak Matica. It was declared a cultural monument in 1963 and is currently a national cultural monument. Today, the building houses a permanent exhibition of the history of Slovak literature, exhibition spaces, deposits and specialized workplaces of the Literary Museum of the Slovak National Library.

=== Second building ===
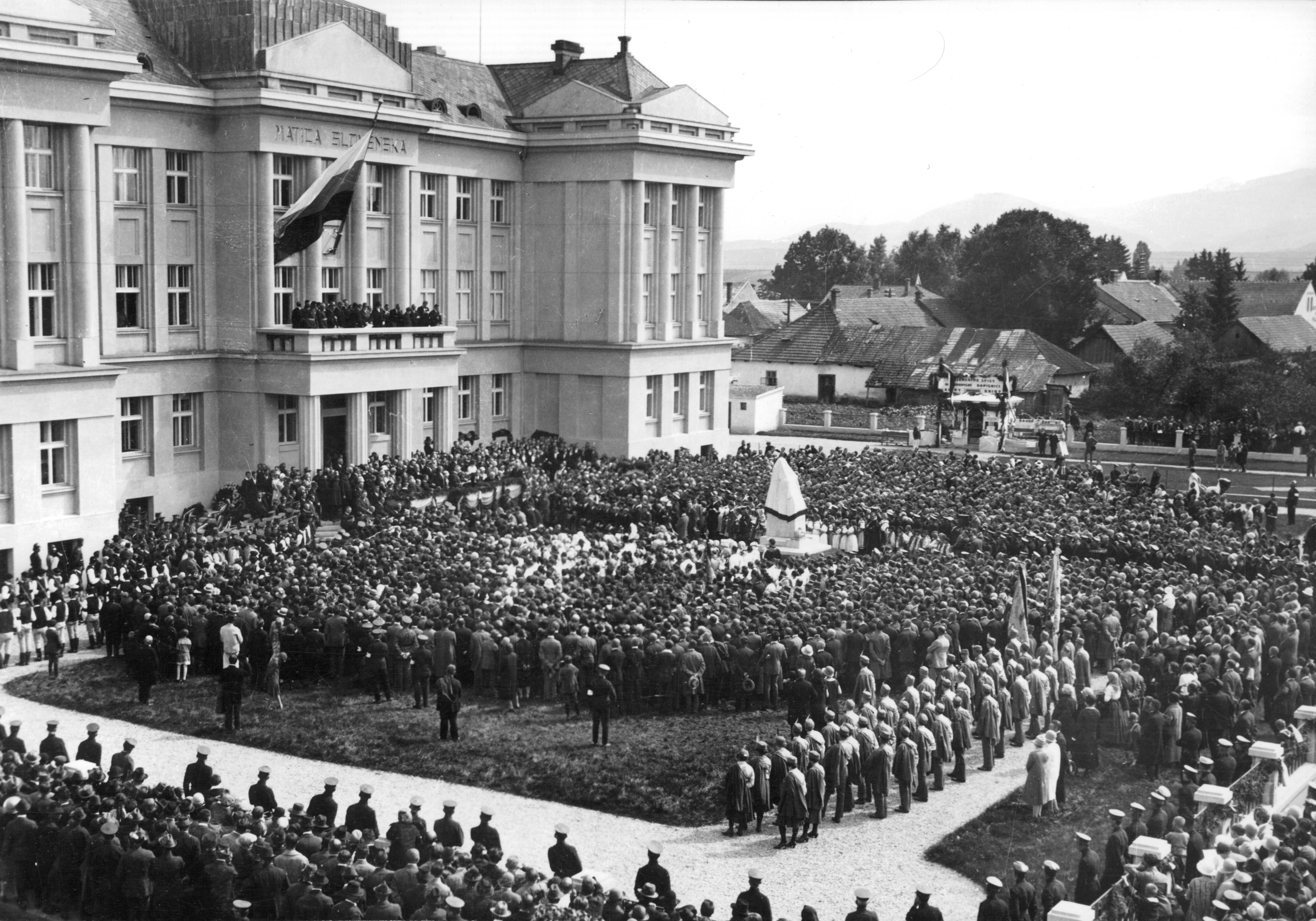
Ceremonial opening of the new, second building of Slovak Matica, built in 1924–1926

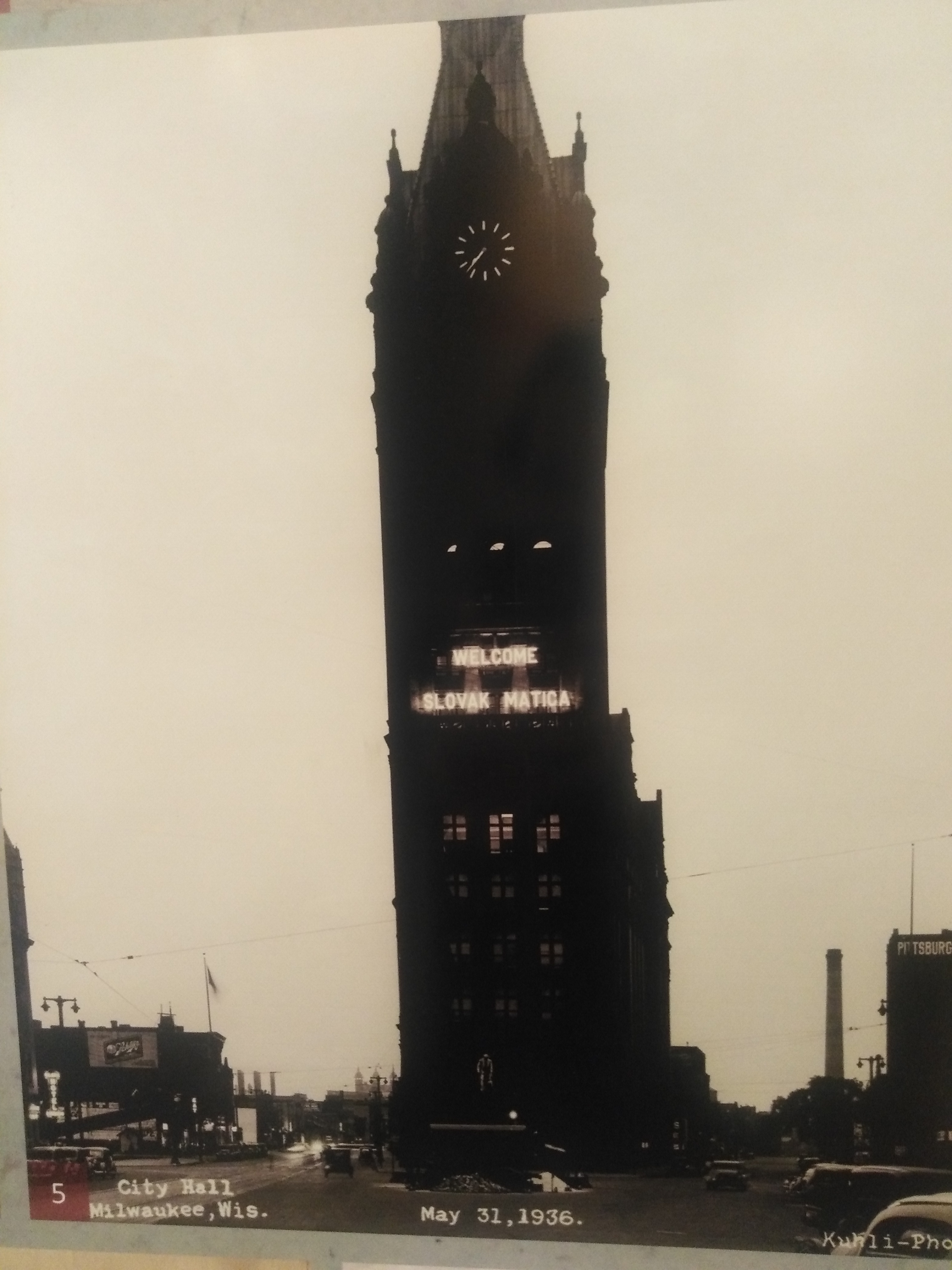
Slovak Matica in USA

The second building of Slovak Matica is currently the central seat of the institution on Pavel Mudroň Street in the wider centre of Martin. Its architect was the Martin builder Ján Palkovič and the construction work was carried out by the builder Stanislav Zachar from Vrútok. The foundation stone of the building was laid on August 13, 1924, during the August mother festivities. Construction took place from the autumn of 1924 to February 1926.

The grand opening of the building took place on August 29, 1926. A monument to the famous Slovak nationalist and writer Svetozár Hurban-Vajanský was unveiled in the courtyard in front of the building. In 1965, he was replaced by the allegorical statue of Slovak Matica by the academic sculptor Ján Kulich, while the monument to Svetozár Hurban-Vajanský moved to the first mother building. In terms of architecture, the second building of the Slovak Matica belongs to the representative buildings of the city of Martin. Characteristic elements of the building such as high columns, portico, tympanums and strict symmetry make it a work of neoclassical architecture. Due to its societal significance, it was declared a cultural monument in 1963, and since 2002, it has been a national cultural monument. In addition to the administrative part, this also applies to the fencing, the garden park and the memorial plaque to the 48 tortured participants in the Slovak National Uprising of 1944. In the garden area, in the Park of St. Cyril and Methodius, there is a representative pantheon of busts of important national and mother actors. The first bust was unveiled on October 2, 2012, on the occasion of the 250th anniversary of the birth of the codifier of standard Slovak, Anton Bernolák. By the end of 2020, a total of fourteen busts of national actors were discovered in the area, which was installed in the following order:

- October 2, 2012: first codifier of Slovak language Anton Bernolák
- August 2, 2013: first Chairman of the Slovak Matica Štefan Moyses, first vice-chairman of the Slovak Matica Karol Kuzmány and honorary vice-chairman of the Slovak Matica Jan Francisci
- August 1, 2014: leader of the national movement in the first half of the 20th century and committee member of Slovak Matica Andrej Hlinka
- August 7, 2015: leader of the Slovak national movement in the 19th century and second codifier of Slovak language Ľudovít Štúr and Slovak Matica administrator and writer Jozef Cíger-Hronský
- August 17, 2016: writer and national actor Svetozár Hurban Vajanský and founder of the Slovak League in America Štefan Furdek
- August 11, 2017: the first chairman of the Slovak National Council Jozef Miloslav Hurban and the founder of the Slovak Matica and the Association of St. Vojtech Andrej Ľudovít Radlinský
- October 30, 2018: Chairman of the Slovak Matica, Slovak National Party and Slovak National Council Matúš Dula
- August 4, 2019: Chairman of the Slovak Matica, first chairman and first General Supervisor of the Evangelical Church of the Augsburg Confession in Slovakia Ján Vanovič
- September 23, 2020: lifetime Administrator of the Slovak Matica Jozef Škultéty
- August 4, 2021: statesman and politician, honorary member of Matica slovenská Alexander Dubček
- October 6, 2021: founder and chairman of the World Congress of Slovaks and a member of the foreign Matica slovenská Štefan Boleslav Roman

=== Third building ===
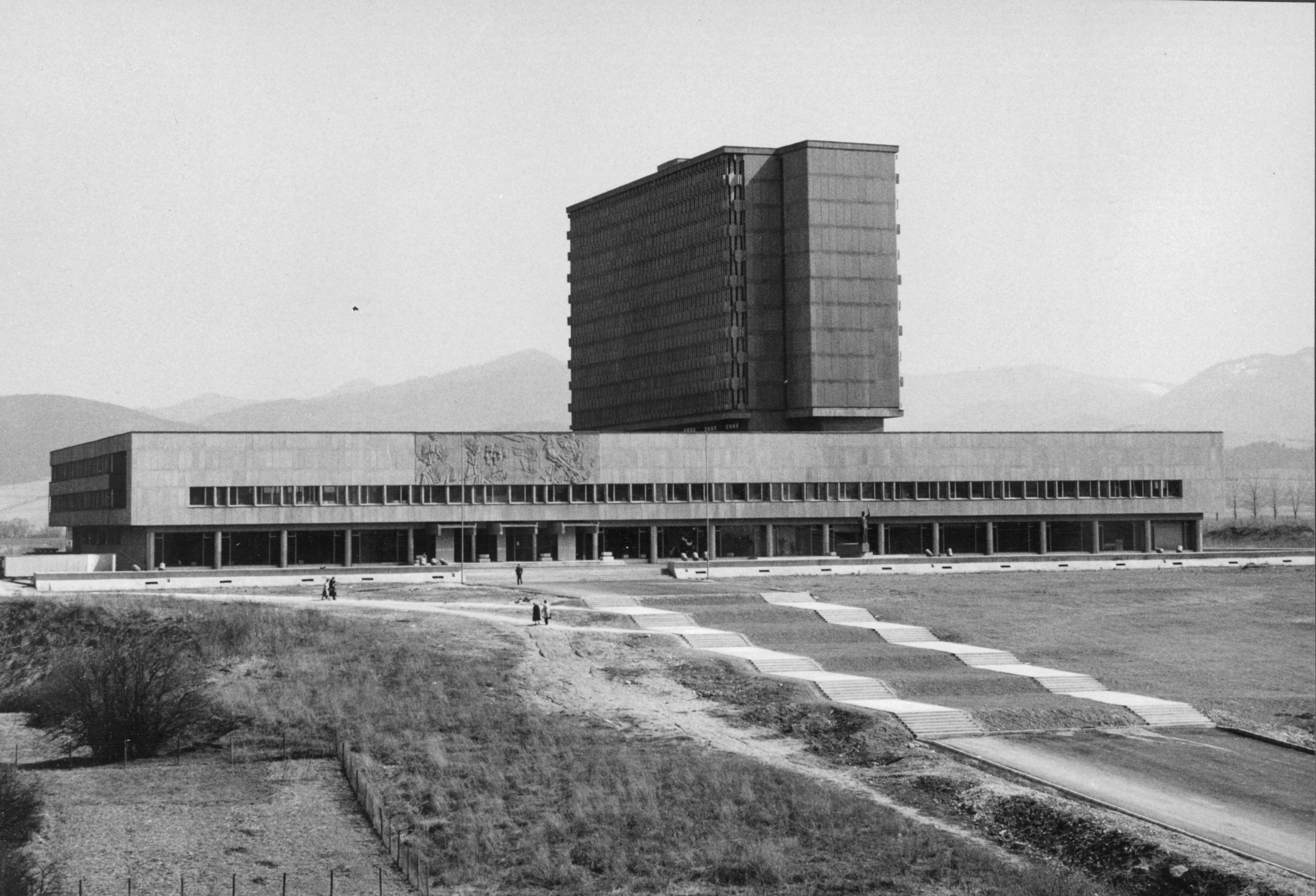
The third register building of Slovak Matica

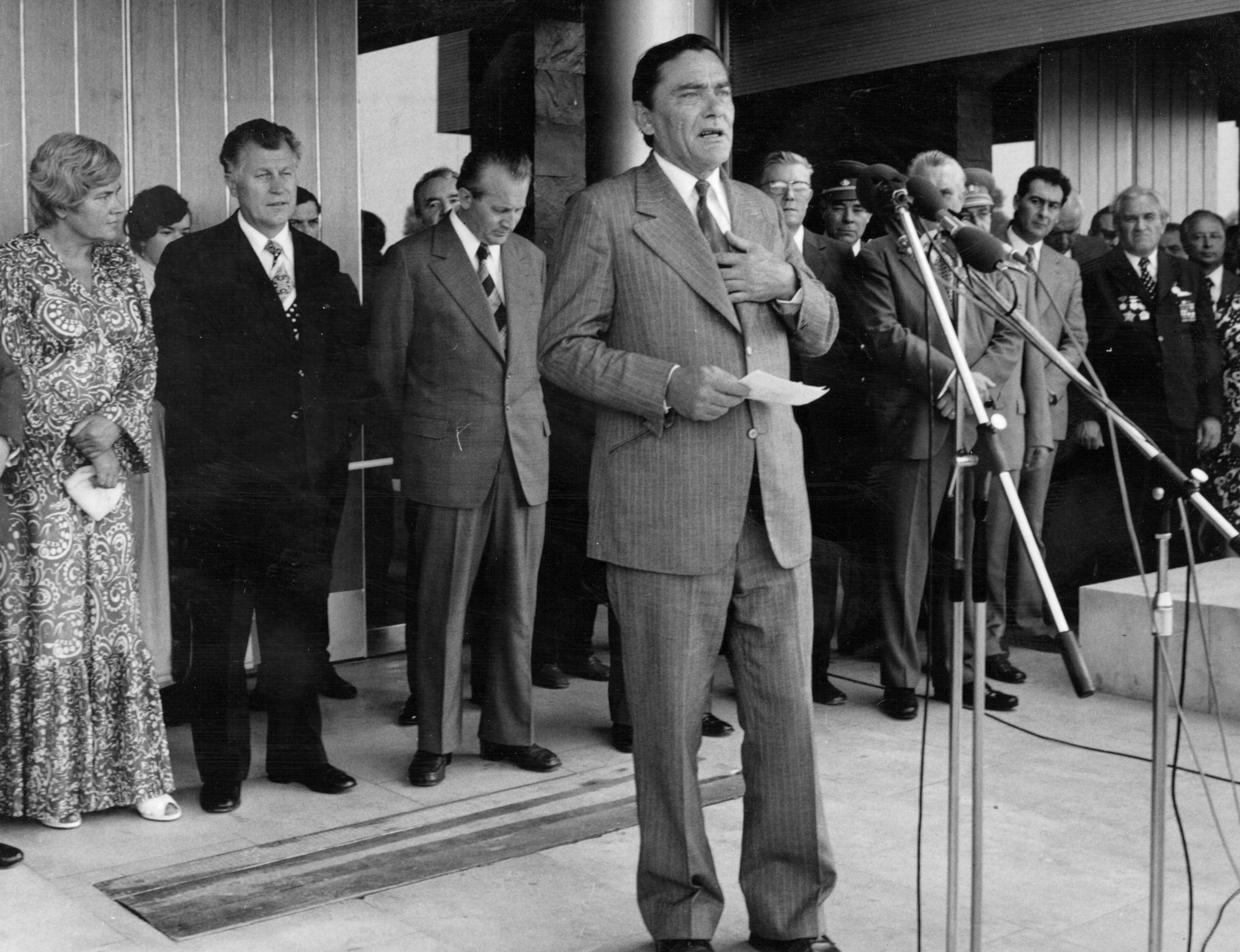
Vladimír Mináč at the opening of the third Slovak Matica building

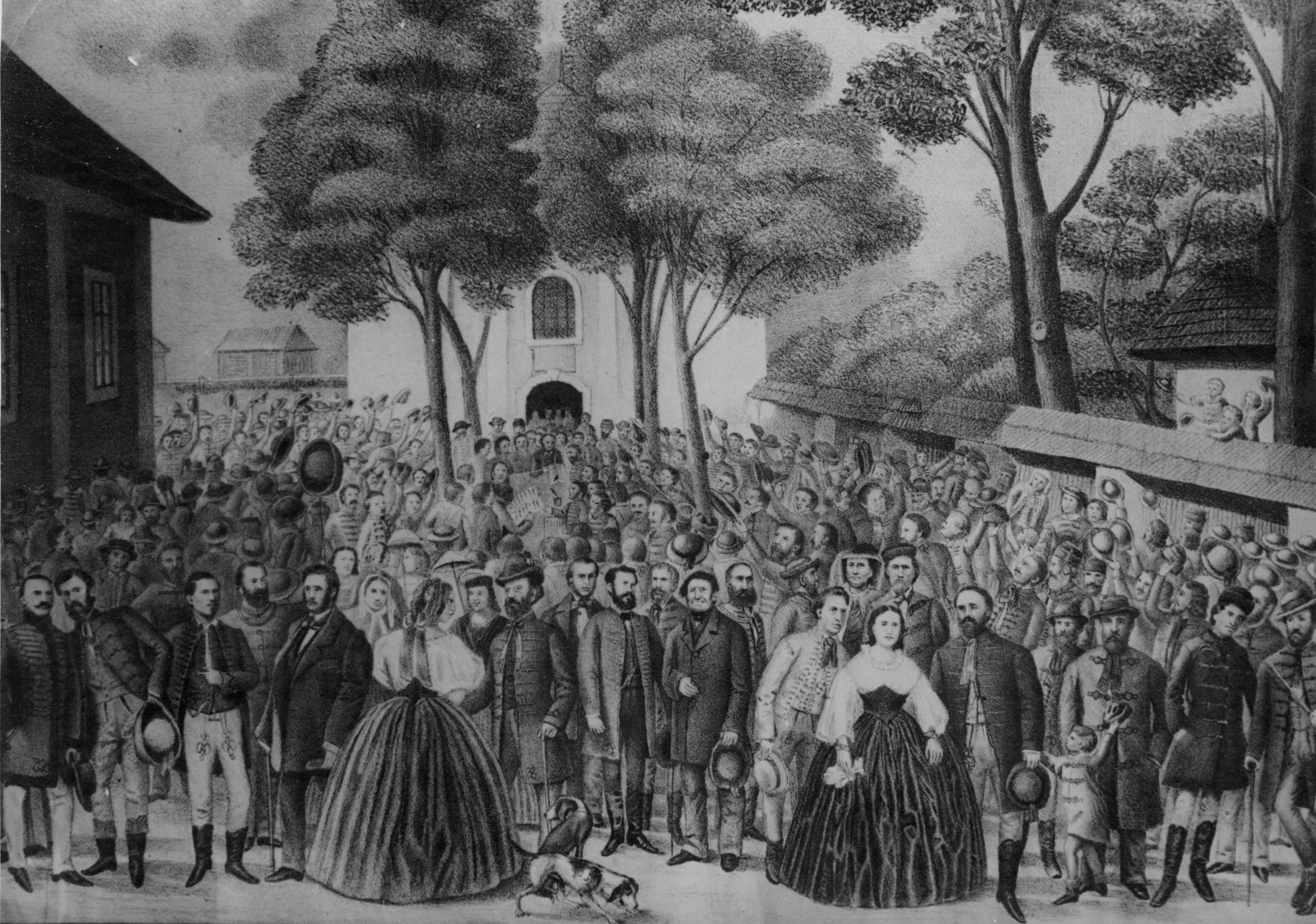
Memorandum of the Slovak Nation

After the adoption of the Library Act of May 2000, the Slovak National Library in Slovak Matica was separated from the Slovak Matica in July 2000 and became an independent legal entity, which acquired its registered office on Hostihora. Paradoxically, by law it was excluded from the Matica's structure, except the third, also the first historical building of the Slovak Matica. The third building became the seat of the Slovak National Library and the Slovak Matica office returned to the second parent building.

The ceremonial laying of the foundation stone for the new, third building of the Slovak Matica on Hostihora (Martin) took place during the celebrations of the Slovak Matica centennial anniversary on August 4, 1963. The third building was opened by Vladimír Mináč.

== History ==
- 1861

On June 6 and 7, at the Slovak National Assembly in Martin, a request for the establishment of a Slovak cultural institution was formulated in a political program known as the Memorandum of the Slovak Nation. The Temporary Committee entrusted the establishment of the institution to the Temporary Committee of Slovak Matica, which carried out all organizational steps leading to its establishment, drafted the first Matica´s statutes and earned their official permission at the imperial court in Vienna.

- 1863

At the inaugural 1st General Assembly on August 4 in Martin, which took place as part of the millennium celebration of the arrival of the Slavic apostles St. Cyril and Methodius to our territory, the Slovak Matica was established. Its goal, in the spirit of national and Christian ideas, was “to awaken, expand and affirm moral and artful education in the members of the Slovak nation; to cultivate and support Slovak literature and fine arts, and thus to help the material well-being of the Slovak nation, and to work on its improvement ”. They elected the Catholic bishop of Banská Bystrica, Štefan Moyses, as the first Chairman of Slovak Matica, and Karol Kuzmány, the first acting Vice-Chairman of the evangelical superintendent, Karol Kuzmány. The most important representatives of the Slovak nation, such as Jozef Miloslav Hurban, Michal Miloslav Hodža, Ján Francisci, Štefan Marko Daxner, Viliam Pauliny-Tóth, Adolf Dobriansky and others, actively worked in the first Slovak Matica committee.

- 1864

By the decision of the 2nd General Assembly, Slovak Matica adopted the Štúr´s Slovak language (according to the reform of Martin Hattala) and the Latin script for the printing of all Matica´s publications and documents.

- 1865

The National Flare, the first building of the Slovak Matica in Martin, was ceremoniously opened on August 8 at the 3rd General Assembly. Its construction was financed from nationwide “grajciar” (money) collections.

- 1866

On October 12, the Austrian Emperor Franz Joseph I of Austria. received in Vienna a Matica delegation led by Viliam Pauliny-Tóth, who expressed allegiance to the monarch for the Slovak Matica and the Slovak Nation after the lost Austro-Prussian war. They also handed him the diploma of the founding member of Slovak Matica, which the monarch accepted.

- 1869

The Book Printing Participant Association (Kníhtlačiarsky účastinársky spolok) was founded in Martin on March 3, the primary goal of which was the effort to create favorable conditions for the publication of Slovak and Matica´s press in the field of book culture. On July 5 died in Svätý Kríž (today Žiar nad Hronom) on the feast of St. Cyril and Methodius, the first Chairman of the Slovak Matica and Bishop Štefan Moyses of Banská Bystrica (born on October 24, 1797).

- 1873

Vice-Chairman of the Slovak Matica Viliam Pauliny-Tóth and its secretary František Víťazoslav Sasinek reacted in the apologetic file Pro memoria of Slovak Matica, printed by The Book Printing Participant Association and addressed to the Hungarian prime minister József Szlávy, to attacks from the Hungarian movement.

- 1875

On November 12, the Hungarian government stopped the activities of Slovak Matica. Hungarian government confiscated all Matica´s property, later provided the financial basis of Slovak Matica (in 1885) to the renegade Hungarian-Regional Slovak Educational Association for the Hungarianization of Slovaks, and distributed the collections to county museums. In the years 1863 to 1875, Slovak Matica developed extensive collecting, publishing, educational and scientific activities. It collected archival, library and museum collections. Slovak Matica has published 82 volumes of books, including 12 volumes of the first Slovak scientific journal Letopis Matice slovenskej. It provided scholarships to Slovak researchers and students, established domestic and foreign contacts with Slavic cultural institutions and Maticas, such as the Serbian Matica (1826), Czech Matica (1831), Illyrian Matica (1842), Lusatian-Serbian Matica (1847), Matica Galician- Ruthenian Matica (1848), Moravian Matica (1849) and Slovenian Matica (1864). Repeated attempts to restore the activities of Slovak Matica after its closure after in November 1875 were unsuccessful. However, other cultural associations with nationwide scope continued in it, especially Živena (cultural woman institution, 1869), Kníhtlačiarsky účastinársky spolok (The Book Printing Participant Association, 1869), Spolok sv. Vojtecha (1870), Slovenský spevokol (Slovak Singer, 1872) and the Muzeálna slovenská spoločnosť (Slovak Museum Society, 1893).

- 1893

A compatriot activist and Roman Catholic priest, founded Slovak Matica in America in Chicago (IL, USA). He was responsible for the development of Slovak expatriate cultural and ecclesiastical associations and schools in the USA. Furdek was also the first Chairman of the Slovak League in America (1907), the unifying organization of expatriate associations of American Slovaks.

- 1919

After the establishment of the Czechoslovak Republic, the Minister with a power of attorney for the administration of Slovakia, Vavro Šrobár, issued a decree on January 1 on the resumption of the activities of Slovak Matica. The revitalizing General Assembly was held on August 5 in Martin. Pavol Országh Hviezdoslav, František Richard Osvald, Matúš Dula (Chairman of the Slovak National Council 1918 – 1919) and Vavro Šrobár were elected its chairmen, Jozef Škultéty and Jaroslav Vlček became the Matica´s administrators. Matica continued its previous scientific, educational, collecting and publishing activities. The membership base began to be organized in the local branches of Slovak Matica. Historically, the first local branch of Slovak Matica was established on November 2 in Martin. By the end of the year, a total of nine local branches of Slovak Matica were established in Slovakia within two months.

- 1920

At the 2nd General Assembly of Slovak Matica on August 25, 1920, they established the scientific departments of Slovak Matica. The Department of History, Linguistics and Ethnography were the first to be established. They were gradually joined by the Artistic (1921), Literary-Historical (1922), Pedagogical (1926), Natural Science (1927), Philosophical (1941) and Sociological (1944).

- 1922

Slovak Matica took over the baton of publishing the oldest Slovak and European cultural magazine Slovenské pohľady (Slovak views), founded by Jozef Miloslav Hurban in 1846 and renewed by Svetozár Hurban Vajanský and Jozef Škultéty in 1881. At the initiative of Slovak Matica, the Center of Slovak Amateur Theaters was established in Martin.

- 1926

On August 29, the new, second building of the Slovak Matica in Martin was ceremoniously opened. The celebration was attended by 15 to 20 thousand people. Architecturally, today's residential building of Slovak Matica is one of Martin's representative architectural structures. The building is a national cultural monument and the current seat of Slovak Matica.

- 1932

The General Assembly on May 12 significantly influenced the further direction of the Slovak Matica, especially in connection with the struggle for the character of the Rules of Slovak Spelling. It focused on the national program, intensified scientific research and developed a rich publishing activity.

- 1940

On February 12, the Ministry of Education and National Enlightenment in Bratislava approved the new Rules of Slovak Spelling without Czechizing Tendencies, which were prepared and published by Slovak Matica and its Language Department (editor Anton Augustín Baník). At the General Assembly of Slovak Matica in Prešov on May 12, Jozef Škultéty became a lifelong honorary administrator. The Slovak Matica Assembly elected Jozef Cíger Hronský as the new administrator of Matica, and Ján Marták, Stanislav Mečiar and Jozef Cincík as secretaries. The report of the Slovak Matica rejected the government's proposal that the Matica's membership be automatically reflected in the political membership in Hlinka's Slovak People's Party.

- 1941

On the initiative of Slovak Matica, the Slovak National Library was established on May 1 in Martin. Its main task was to acquire and preserve the books in relation to Slovaks and Slovakia.

- 1943

On behalf of the Slovak Matica Committee, the Neografia participant association was founded in Martin as one of the most modern printing companies in Europe.

- 1944

On August 29, 1944, the Slovak National Uprising broke out as one of the most important armed resistances in Nazi Germany-occupied Europe. Thousands of members and officials of Slovak Matica took part in the insurgent events, likes Jan Barták, Alexander Hirner, František Oktavec, Vavro Šrobár, Laco Novomeský and from youngers such as Vladimír Mináč, Roman Kaliský and Eva Kristínová.

- 1945

On January 25, several leading employees and officials left the Slovak Matica in Martin: Jozef Cíger Hronský (administrator), František Hrušovský (secretary of scientific departments), Stanislav Mečiar, Jozef Cincík (both secretaries) and clerks Koloman Geraldini, Dezider Nágel, Ján Okáľ and Jozef Kobella, who supported to the official culture of the regime of the then Slovak Republic (1939–1945). Later, they remained in foreign exile for life. Their names were to be erased not only from the Slovak Matica tradition but also from the collective memory of the nation. Based on the decision of the Commission of the Slovak National Council for Education and Enlightenment of April 11, Ján Marták took over the interim administration of Slovak Matica. At the General Assembly in August 1945 in Martin, they elected Laco Novomeský and Jur Hronec as the new chairmen.

- 1948

The communist regime nationalizes the Slovak Matica´s publishing company Neografia. Between 1949 and 1953, the political authorities gradually took over Slovak Matica's scientific activity, dissolved its membership base and reduced the institution to the headquarters of enlightenment work. The previous scientific activity was transferred from the Slovak Matica departments to the relevant institutes of the Slovak Academy of Sciences and Arts in Bratislava.

- 1954

In April, the Slovak National Council adopted the Act on the Slovak Matica, which nationalized it, and merged its torso with Slovakia by the National Library. Slovak Matica under its brand began to fulfill only the tasks of the national library and library institute.

- 1958

The communist regime staged a trial against compilers preparing a lexicographic work – The National Encyclopedia – Alexander Hirner, Ján Olex, Jozef Telgárský, František Oktavec, who were sentenced to many years in prison. In connection with this monster trial by party checks and other political interventions against Slovak Matica, several workers had to leave it, even the Matica´s administrator Ján Marták.

- 1959

Due to the serious restriction of the freedom of the Slovak Matica in their homeland, in Buenos Aires, Argentina, they founded the Slovak Foreign Matica, chaired by Jozef Cíger Hronský.

- 1963

While the political situation is improving, Slovak Matica commemorated the centenary of its founding with grand celebrations. Slovak Matica was awarded the highest state award by the Council of the Republic, which was presented by the then important state and party representative Alexander Dubček. On August 4, the foundation stone of the third building of the Slovak Matica in Martin on Hostihor was laid.

- 1968

Political liberalization in society also brought hope to revive the original mission and activities of Slovak Matica, including the renewal of its membership base and the development of care for foreign Slovaks. This promising process lasted only a short time and was stopped on August 21 after the occupation of the Czechoslovak Republic by the soldiers of the Warsaw Pact and in the subsequent normalization process. For political reasons, during so called normalization, many employees had to leave Slovak Matica (Tomáš Winkler, Ivan Kadlečík, Pavol Hrúz, Jaroslav Rezník Sr. and others) and officials (Imrich Sedlák).

- 1973

On December 20, the Slovak National Council adopted the Act on the Slovak Matica, which partially returned it to the status of twenty years ago. The membership base was significantly limited, only a minority of local unions survived, and the activities of Slovak Matica once again focused primarily on librarianship, bibliography, biography, literary museology and archiving. From 1974 to 1990, during the era of socialist culture, the chairman of Slovak Matica was the chairman of the novelist, publicist and political figure Vladimír Mináč, who during this period has merits in the development of scientific activity in Slovak Matica.

- 1975

On August 30, a new, generously designed third building of the Slovak Matica, the work of architects Dušan Kuzma and Anton Cimmerman, was opened in Martin on Hostihor.

- 1990

On January 20, the Minister of Culture dismissed the leadership of Slovak Matica, headed by Vladimír Mináč, and entrusted its temporary leadership to Viliam Gruska as chairman and Imrich Sedlák as administrator. Many former employees, members and supporters have once again signed up for Slovak Matica. From August 10 to 11, the reviving general meeting of the Slovak Matica in Martin took place. At the General Meeting, Jozef Markuš was elected Chairman of the Slovak Matica.

- 1991

On July 26, the Slovak National Council adopted a new law on the Slovak Matica, which created space for its gradual return from a state-run institution to an independent institution. Significantly the association activities of Slovak Matica are being developed and prioritized, and the network of institutional workplaces is being transformed to support it.

- 1992

Slovak Matica in cooperation with the World Congress of Slovaks for the first time organized a meeting of young Slovaks from all over the world under the official name World Festival of Slovak Youth. It took place from July 12 to 19 in Martin. The Matica´s Festival was organized by Slovak Matica every third year.

- 1993

The establishment of the independent Slovak Republic was the culmination of a long stage in the struggle of Slovak Matica for Slovak national identity. The theses of the National Program of the Slovak Matica, conceived in the years 1991 to 1992, are gradually being fulfilled. The printer Neografia, nationalized by the totalitarian regime, the magazine Slovenské pohľady (Slovak views) and some nationalized Matica´s houses returned to the Slovak Matica.

- 1997

By a law of February 13, adopted by the National Council of the Slovak Republic, Slovak Matica becomes a public institution, while in addition to its historical tasks it has to fulfill defined state tasks. On July 17, they opened the World Year of Slovaks in Martin.

- 2000

The National Council of the Slovak Republic approved the Library Act no. 183/2000, which was prepared by the then Minister of Culture Milan Kňažko without the participation of Slovak Matica. The law adversely affected the activities of Slovak Matica. Matica had to leave the residential building in Martin on Hostihor, but also the historically first building – both belonged to the administration of the Slovak National Library.

- 2001

The General Assembly of the Slovak Matica (November 16–17) in Martin was held in a difficult situation, marked by the adoption of the Library Act, which excluded the Slovak National Library from the administration of the Slovak Matica.

- 2004

The General Assembly of Slovak Matica in Spišská Nová Ves adopted the Program Intentions for the period from 2004 to 2007 with a view to 2010, as well as the Memorandum of Slovaks at home and abroad.

- 2007

Slovak Matica organized the 1st European Congress of the Maticas of Slavic Nations, which was attended by representatives from all countries (Czech Republic, Croatia, Germany, Slovenia, Serbia, Ukraine), where national Matica´s associations operate.

- 2008

The historically first meeting of the Government of the Slovak Republic with the participation of the highest constitutional officials and the Chairman of the Slovak Matica was held on January 2 on the occasion of the 15th anniversary of the Slovak Republic in a residential building on Pavla Mudroňa Street in Martin.

- 2009

The Year of Jozef Cíger Hronský was opened as part of the Martin Matica´s Festival (August 2009 to July 2010) on the occasion of the 50th anniversary of the establishment of the Foreign Slovak Matica and the 50th anniversary of the death of Jozef Cíger Hronský.

- 2010

Slovak Matica in cooperation with the Nitra self-governing region, the city of Nitra, other cities and municipalities organized the 11th year of the World Festival of Slovak Youth from July 1 to 5. In November, the General Assembly of Slovak Matica in Martin elected Marián Tkáč as its new chairman, who took over Jozef Markuš after a twenty-year controversial presidency.

- 2013

The 2nd European Congress of the Maticas of Slavic Nations took place in Martin on August 1, 2013, which was attended by representatives of the Slovak Matica, Slovenian Matica, Silesian Matica, Matica bunjevacka, Czech Matica, Montenegro Matica, Serbian Matica (Lusatian-Serbian Matica in Germany), Slovak Matica in Transcarpathia, the Union of Slovaks in Croatia, the Slovak Matica in Serbia and the Forum of Slavic Cultures from Slovenia. The Congress Memorandum states: "We will intensify our cultural activities within national cultures and respect the values of minority and regional cultures, because ignoring them ultimately impoverishes the richness and diversity of the human spirit, which protects all cultures and languages of the world in the most diverse aspects." The National Maticas Festivities took place in Martin from August 1 to 4, culminating in the celebrations of the 150th anniversary of the founding of the Slovak Matica. The highlight of the second day was the ceremonial opening of the Park of St. Cyril and Methodius in the area of the residential Matica´s building, unveiling of the sculpture of St. Cyril and Methodius and the bust of Štefan Moyses, Karol Kuzmány and Ján Francisci.

- 2015

In the Year of Ľudovít Štúr Slovak Matica held 86 events in Slovakia dedicated to the national great, of which were three scientific conferences.

- 2017

In November, the General Assembly of Slovak Matica in Liptovský Mikuláš elected Marián Gešper as the youngest Chairman of the institution in terms of age, thus beginning the process of the generational arrival of new young Matica´s representatives.

- 2018

Slovak Matica declared 2018 as the Year of Slovak statehood. Matica presented to the public the historical path of Slovaks to an independent and democratic Slovak Republic and recalled anniversaries of personalities and events without which Slovaks would not become an emancipated and independent nation with their own statehood. Slovak Matica organized a series of thematic events to commemorate of the 100th anniversary of the signing of the Declaration of the Slovak Nation and the establishment of the first Czechoslovak Republic in 1918. A new magazine for the Matica´s movement Hlas Matice (Voice of Matica) was created. Its establishment was a fulfillment of one of the long-term requirements of local unions and the membership base of the Slovak Matica.

- 2019

Slovak Matica commemorated the centenary of the renewal of its activities. On this occasion, Matica focused on scientific research into the development of its membership base in the first half of the 20th century and on the historically first local unions founded in 1919 in Martin, Liptovský Mikuláš, Ružomberok, Košice, Trenčín, Zvolen, Brezno, Banská Bystrica and Uzhhorod.
The 4th Congress of Maticas and Institutions of Slavic Nations was held in Martin from June 5 to 6 (the 3rd Congress of Slavic Maticas was held in Slovenia on February 4, 2014) but also about other social organizations that deal with Slavic culture and science. The participants accepted the statement: “In the ongoing processes of globalization, liberalization, information, internet and cyber technologies and wars, post-industrial times and postmodern Slavic matrices, and cultural institutions of Slavic nations must continue to promote and spread traditional conservative values, especially Christianity and patriotism. Especially in the Slavic and European environment, we want to preserve the Cyril and Methodist tradition, help establish the All-Slavic and national identity and historical awareness."
On October 12, 364 delegates gathered at the Assembly of the Slovak Matica in Liptovský Mikuláš. At the Assembly, they adopted the updated Statutes of the Slovak Matica and approved the Slovak Matica Program for the years 2019 to 2021 with a view to 2025.

- 2020

Slovak Matica declared 2020 as the Year of National Identity in the spirit of intensive support and dissemination of Slovak national identity and the development of Slovak statehood. The first two issues of the new professional magazine Slovak Matica Slovensko – National Spectrum were published. The magazine is published twice a year. The Slovak Matica Library was renewed at the institution's headquarters and its systematic development began.

- 2021

Slovak Matica declared 2021 as the Year of Alexander Dubček and unveiled a bust of him in the Alley of National Awakeners in Martin. Marián Gešper, who received 213 votes, becomes the newly elected chairman again, while Štefan Martinkovič received 88 votes. In 2021, in addition to Alexander Dubček, it also commemorated the centenary of the birth of Štefan Boleslav Roman, a Canadian industrialist and the first president of the World Congress of Slovaks, to whom it unveiled the historically first bust in Slovakia, and the 190th anniversary of the East Slovak Peasant Uprising was commemorated by Slovak Matica with a series of events and activities throughout Slovakia. Slovak Matica commemorated the 160th anniversary of the adoption of the important emancipatory and political document, the Memorandum of the Slovak Nation.

- 2022

Slovak Matica declared 2022 as THE YEAR OF THE LEGACY OF THE ŠTÚR'S GROUP and on this occasion prepared and participated in a series of cultural, educational and tourist events, openings and exhibitions, scientific conferences, unveiling of memorial rooms, memorial plaques, busts, publication of scientific and popular - scientific articles, popular science brochures and also the preparation of documentary films. A bust of Štefan Marko Daxner was unveiled in the Alley of National Awakeners in Martin. In 2022, the Library of Slovak Matica was expanded. Slovak Matica received an official Certificate of Competence for Research and Development, awarded by the Ministry of Education, Science, Research and Sports of the Slovak Republic. Scientist of Slovak Matica Pavol Parenička was awarded the Vojtech Zamarovský National Prize for non-fiction. A bust of Vladimír Mináč was unveiled in the Alley of National Awakeners in Rimavská Sobota (scientists Lukáš Perný and Radoslav Žgrada organized a triptych of commemorative and scientific events on the occasion of the 100th anniversary of Vladimír Mináč and the 120th anniversary of the birth of Vladimír Clementis in Bratislava and Rimavská Sobota). Matica slovenská presented the Special IN MEMORIAM prize to dissident Roman Kaliský and organized a commemorative colloquium on the occasion of his centenary; Lukáš Perný compiled the commemorative publication "Roman Kaliský, a worker in the service of the nation". Together with the Union of Anti-Fascist Fighters, Matica Slovak presented awards to other important figures of Slovak culture. In October 2022, Matica Slovak commemorated the 260th anniversary of the birth of Anton Bernolák in Nové Zámky and the 140th anniversary of the birth of Jozef Miloslav Országh in Bratislava.

- 2023

On the occasion of the 160th anniversary of the foundation of the institution announced the year 2023 as the year of Slovak Matica. Matica continues to celebrate the 200th anniversary of the birth of the members of the Štúr's Group and the members of the Bernolák's Group, also the 30th anniversary of foundation of the Slovak republic, the 1400th anniversary of Samo's Empire and the 1160th anniversary of arrival of St. Cyril and Methodius to Great Moravia.
In 2023, Slovak Matica entered the international context - by organizing the 5th Congress of Cultural Institutions of the Slavic Nations (Lusatian Serbs, Serbs, Slovenes, Silesians (Czech Republic), Russians and Ruthenians participated), publishing the magazine Slavic Horizon and an official delegation in Matica of Serbia (Novi Sad) and the Association of Serbian Writers (Belgrade) in Serbia.

- 2024

Matica declared the year 2024 as the Year of Slovak Women in the National Movement and also published the official logos for the 80th anniversary of the Slovak National Uprising, the 100th anniversary of the birth of Ladislav Tažký, the 120th anniversary of the birth of Ladislav Novomeský, the 160th anniversary of the birth of Andrej Hlinka, the anniversary of the Bernolák's and Štúr's group. Matica continued to enter the international context in 2024 by participating in the 160th anniversary of Slovene society with the participation of the President of Slovenia Nataša Pirc Musar. Matica Slovakia was also visited by the ambassador of Slovenia, Dr. Stanislav Raščan. Prominent figures of Slovak science Dalimír Hajko, Rudolf Dupkala and Josef Leikert were elected honorary chairmen of the Culturological and Philosophical Department of Slovak Matica, which is led by culturologist and philosopher Lukáš Perný. The artists of Slovak Matica slovenska exhibited their works in the cities of Strasbourg and Brussels. Slovak Matica entered into cooperation with the Ministry of Foreign Affairs of the Slovak Republic (Juraj Blanár). The oldest Slovak cultural magazine Slovenské pohľady (Slovak views) changed its design and a separate website slovenskepohlady.sk was also created. Matica commemorated the 105th anniversary of the death of Milan Rastislav Štefánik, the 30th anniversary of Ladislav Mňačko (commemorative events in Bratislava and a conference in Rimavská Sobota; Matice slovenská honored Josef Leikert for his lifelong work on this occasion), the 160th anniversary of the birth of Jozef Murgaš (lecture) and other events.

- 2025

Slovak Matice declared 2025 the Year of Slovaks living Abroad. In September 2025, the 6th Congress of Maticas and institutions of Slavic nations was organized in cooperation with the Ministry of Foreign Affairs, combined with an international scientific conference on the second (Czechoslovak) wave of national revival (Pavol Jozef Šafarik, Ján Kollár, František Palacký, Karol Kuzmány).

- 2026

The year 2026 is dedicated to the legacy of Viliam Pauliny-Tóth (conference, bust unveiling, publication). In 2026, the exhibition of artists VÝTVARNÁ MATICA II. was held for representatives of Germany, China, Bulgaria, Costa Rica, Serbia, Hungary, Cuba, Azerbaijan, Kazakhstan and France; it is the most internationally presented exhibition in the entire history of the Slovak Matica.

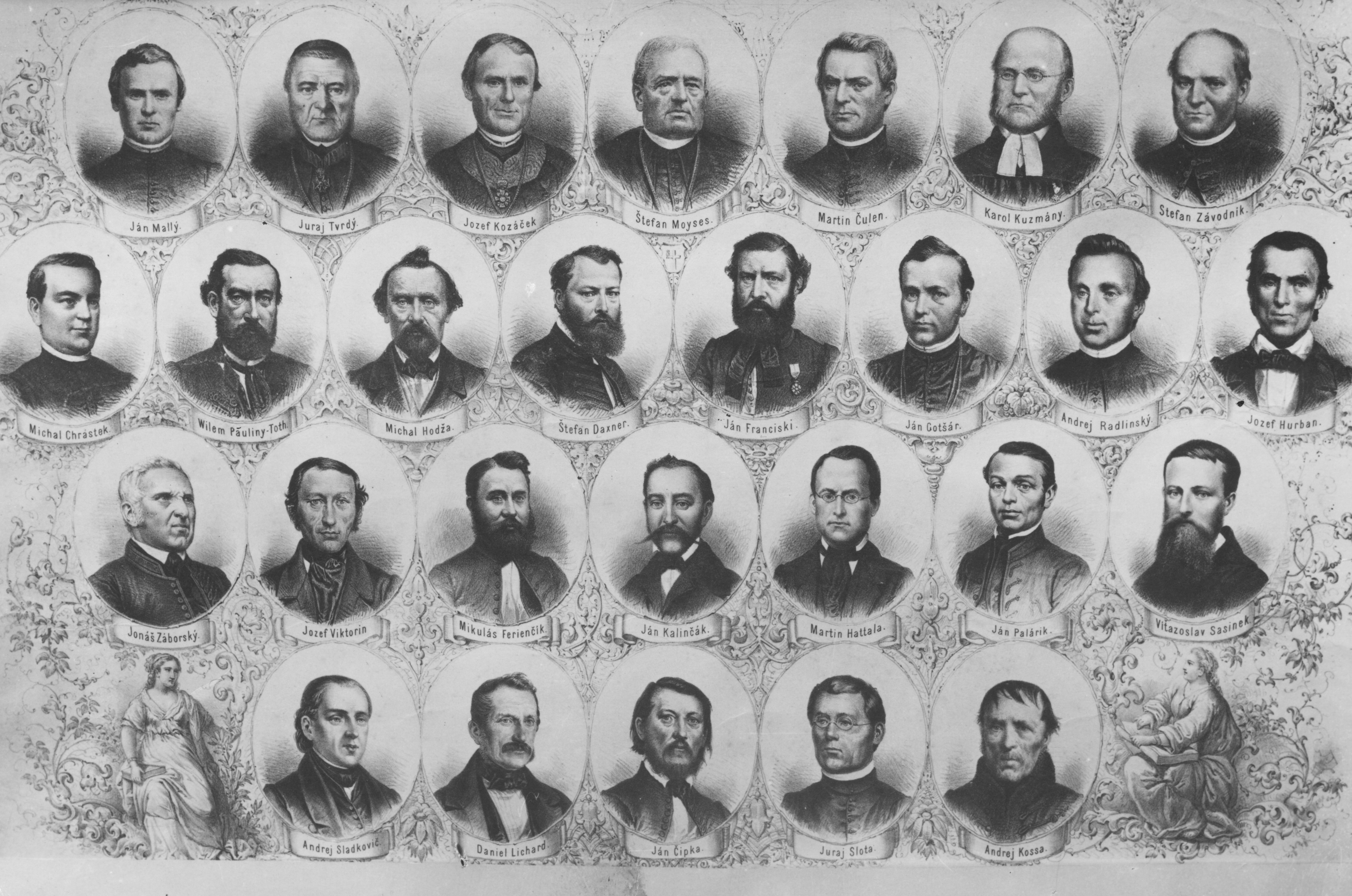
Slovak national awakeners, founders of Slovak Matica

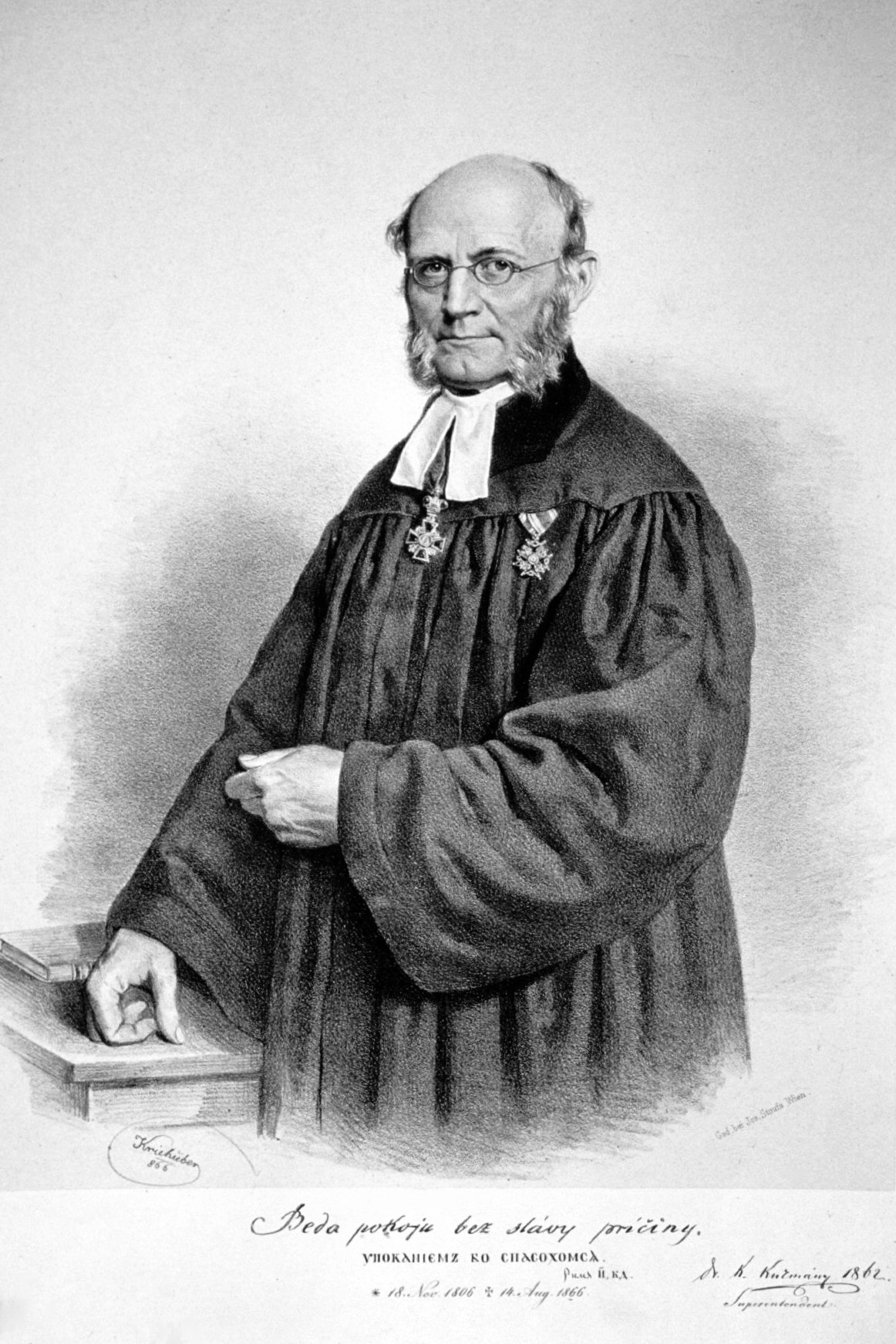
Karol Kuzmány, the first acting vice-chairman of the evangelical superintendent

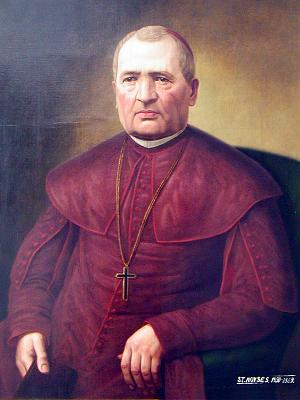
Stefan Moyzes, the first Chairman of Slovak Matica

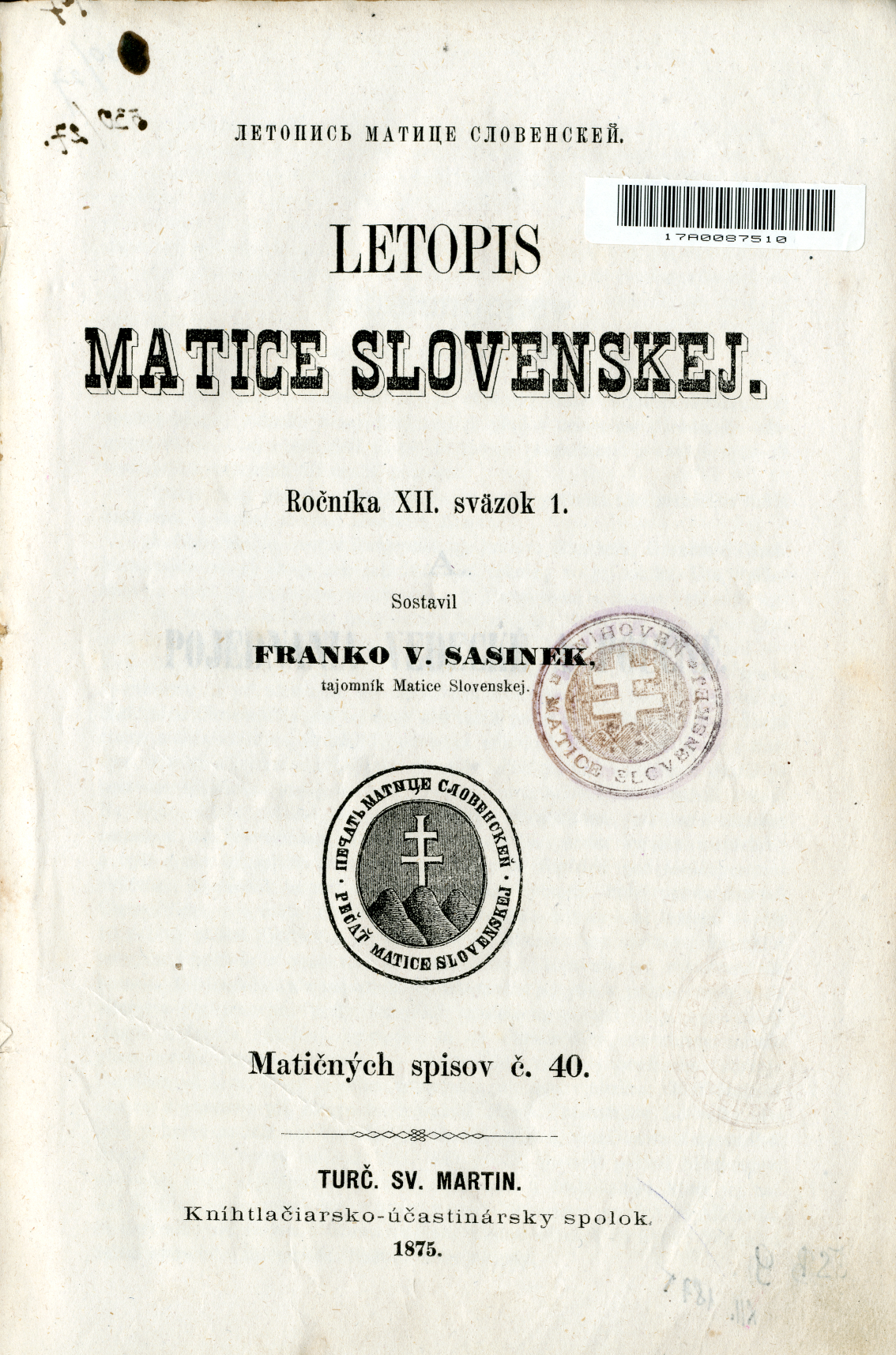
Letopis of Slovak Matia - the first Slovak scientific journal

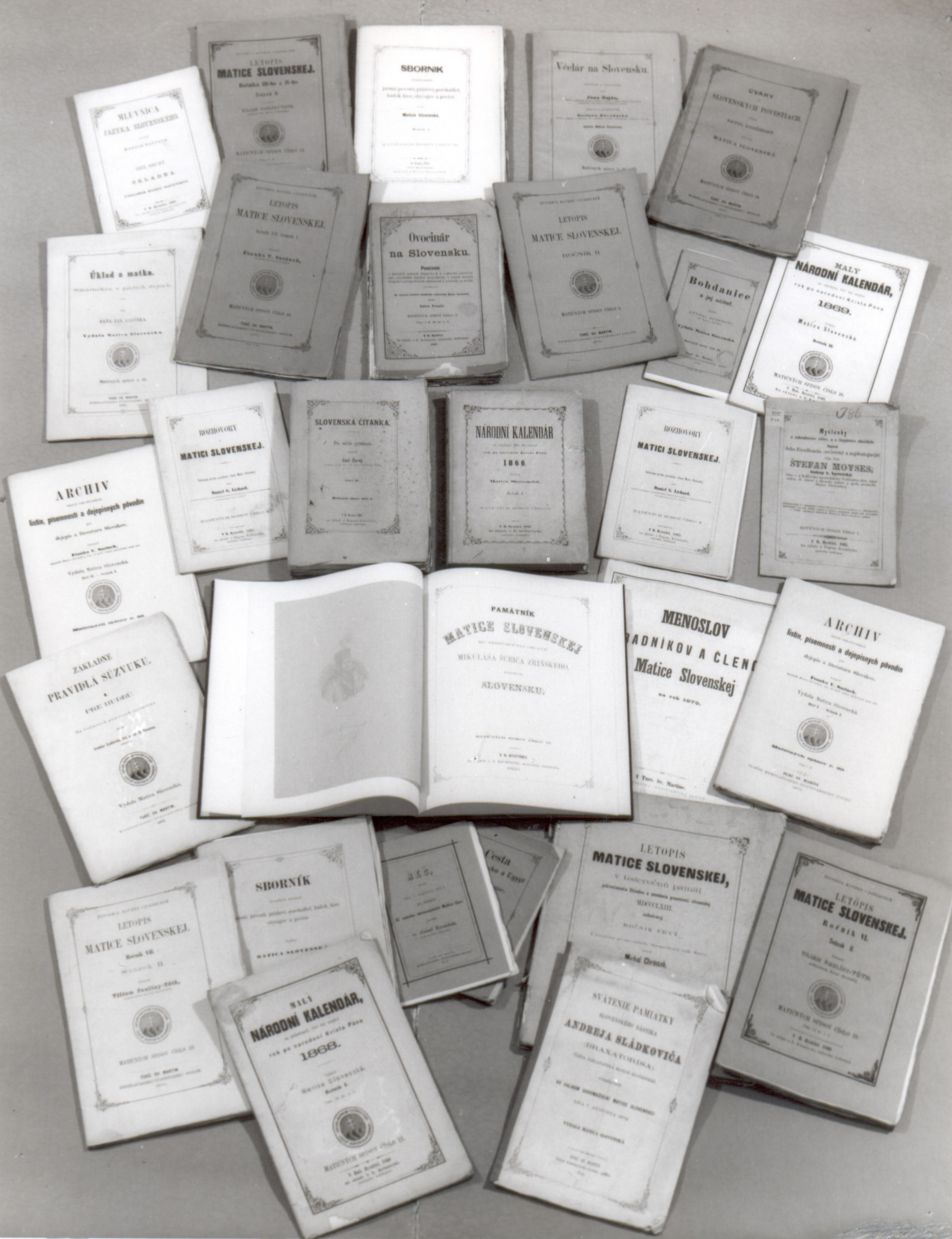
Publishing production of Matica slovenská from the years 1863 to 1875

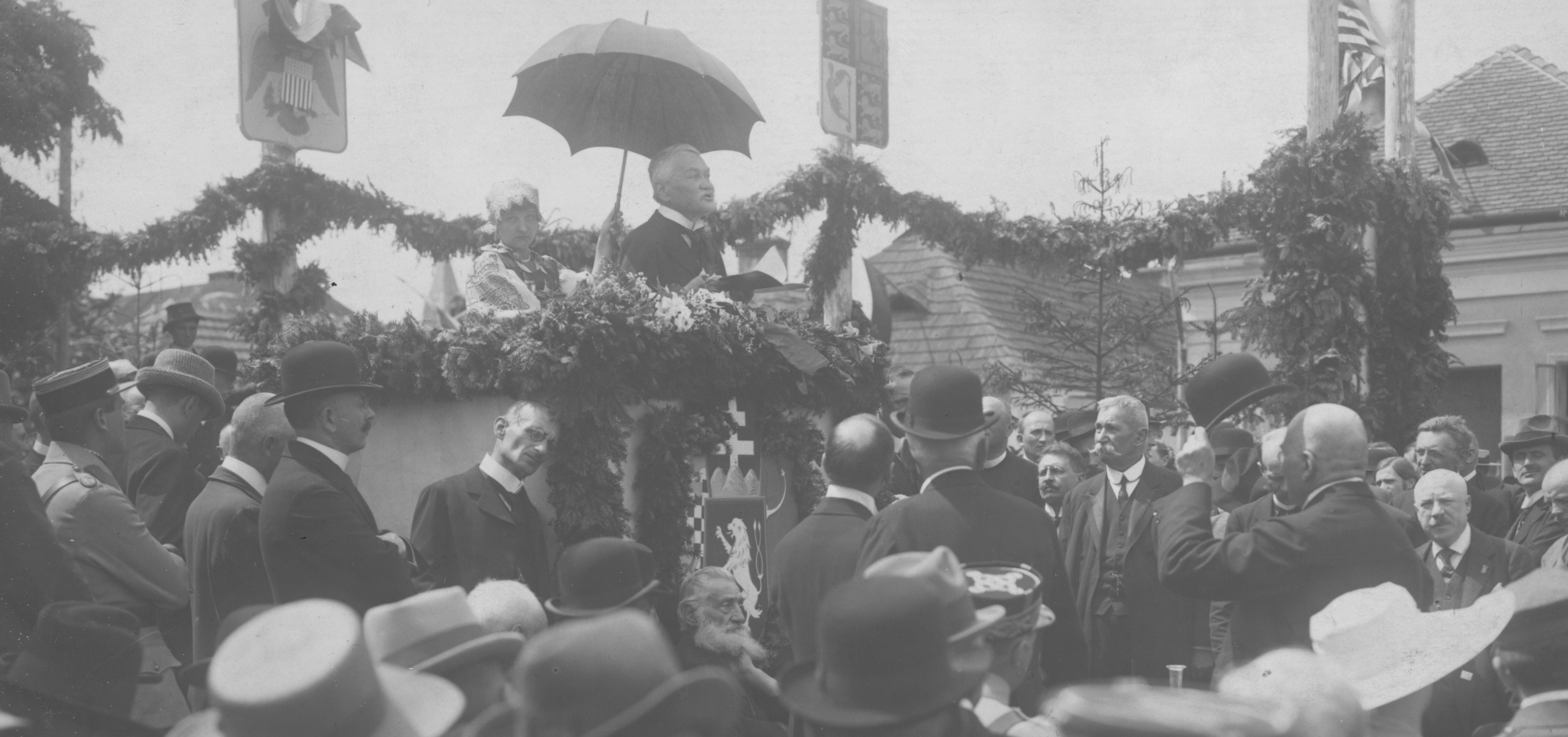
Hviezdoslav speaking at the celebration of the revival of Matica slovenska

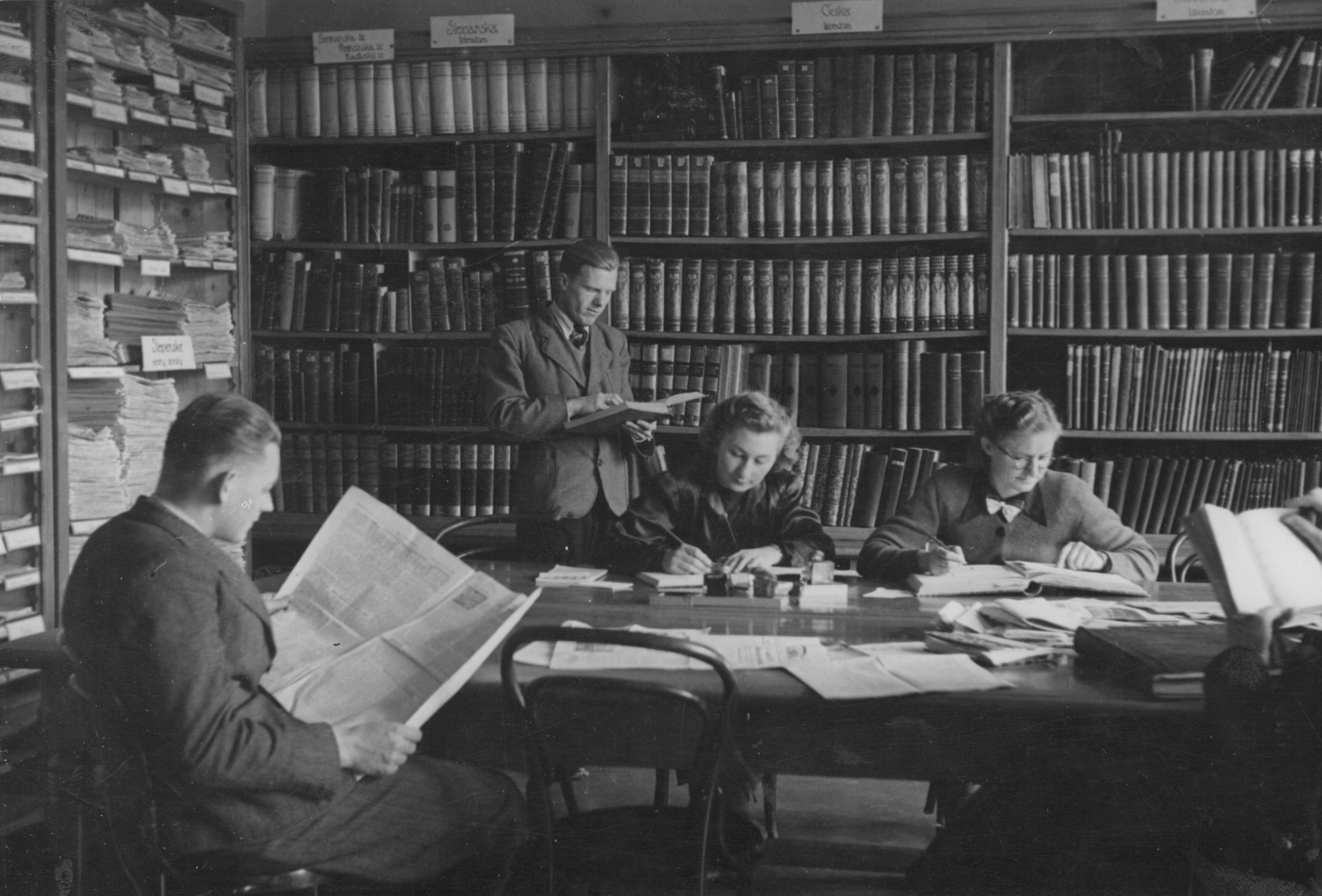
Study room of the Library of Matice Slovak 1941.jpg

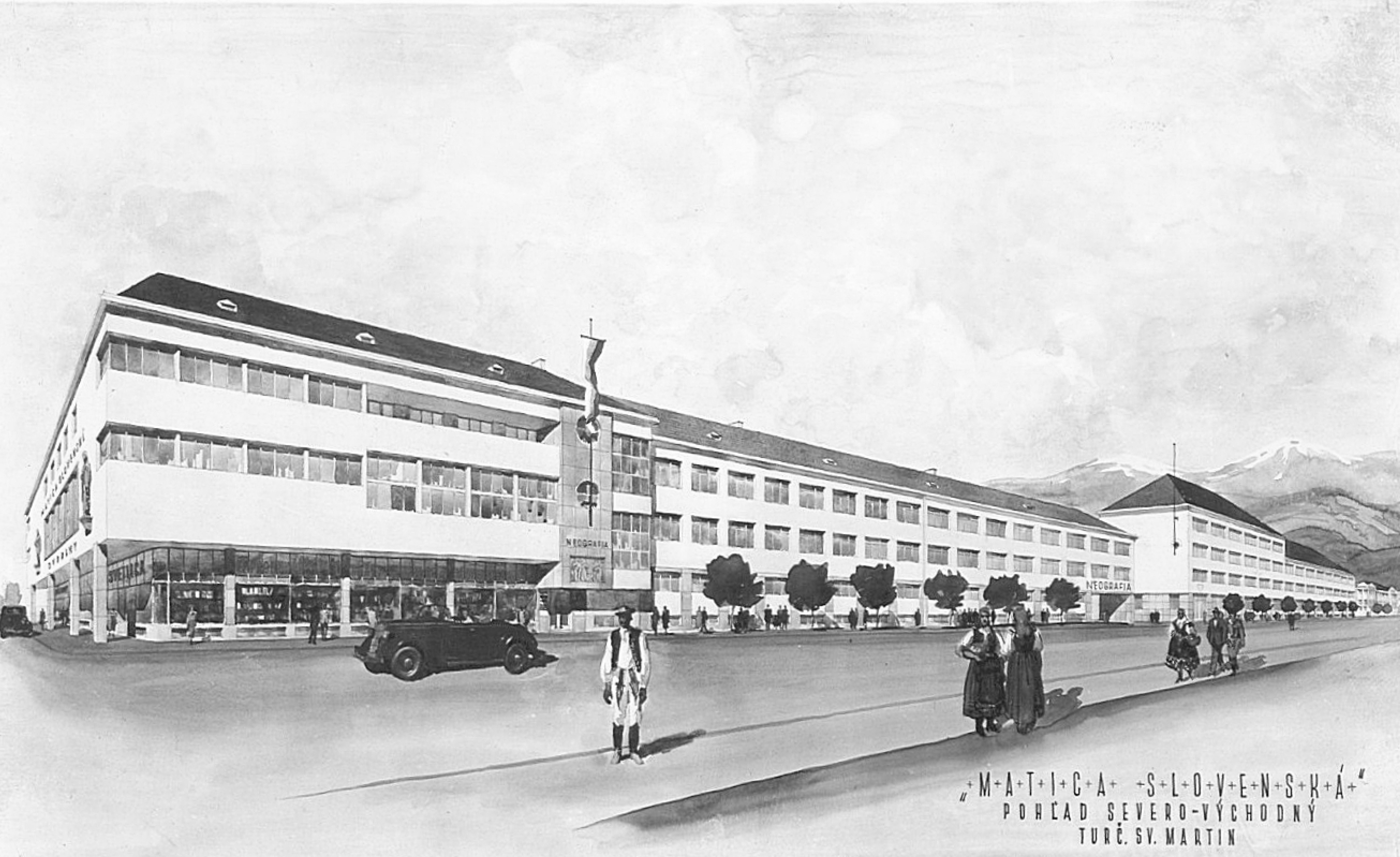
Neografia

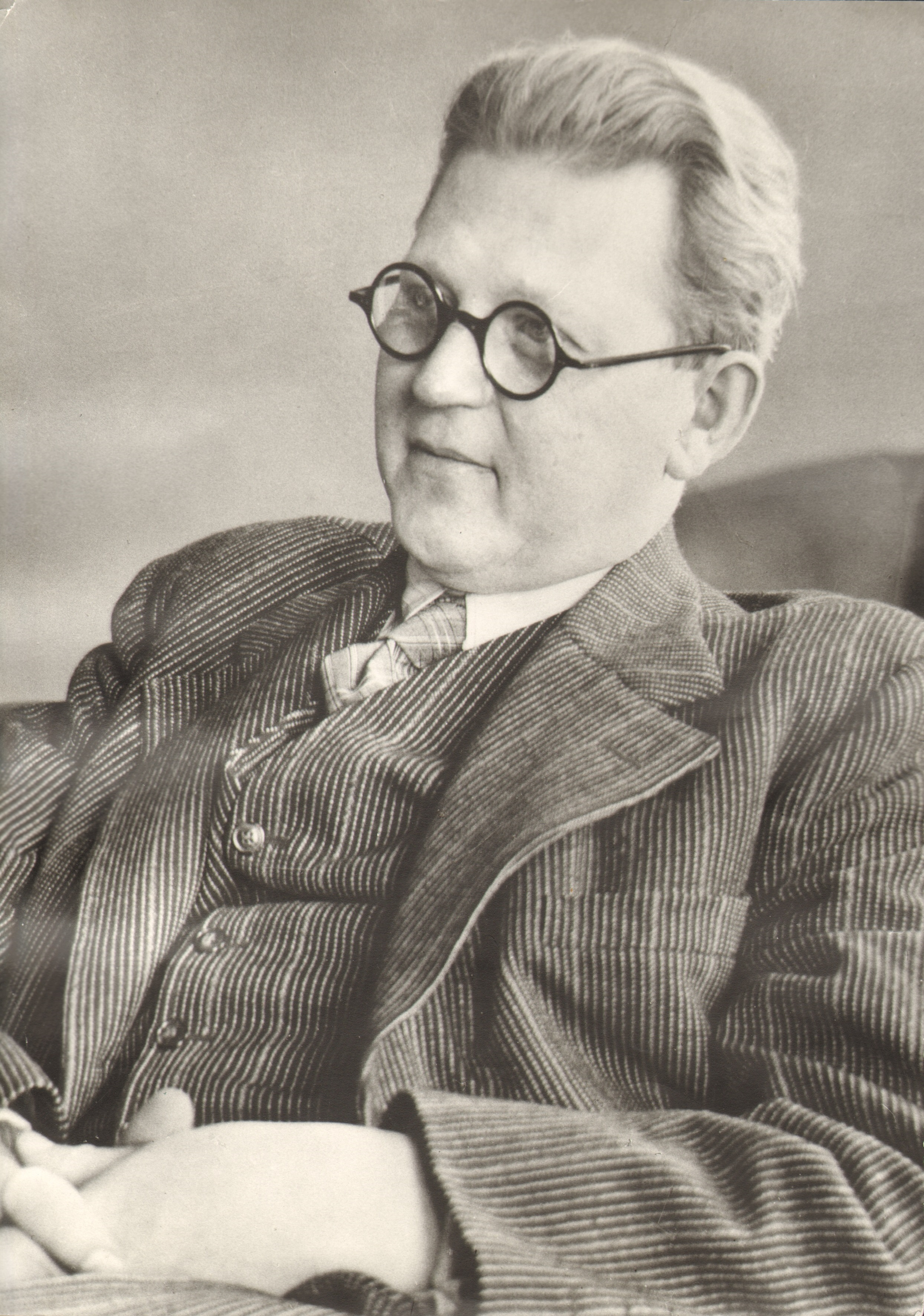
Jozef Cíger-Hronský.jpg

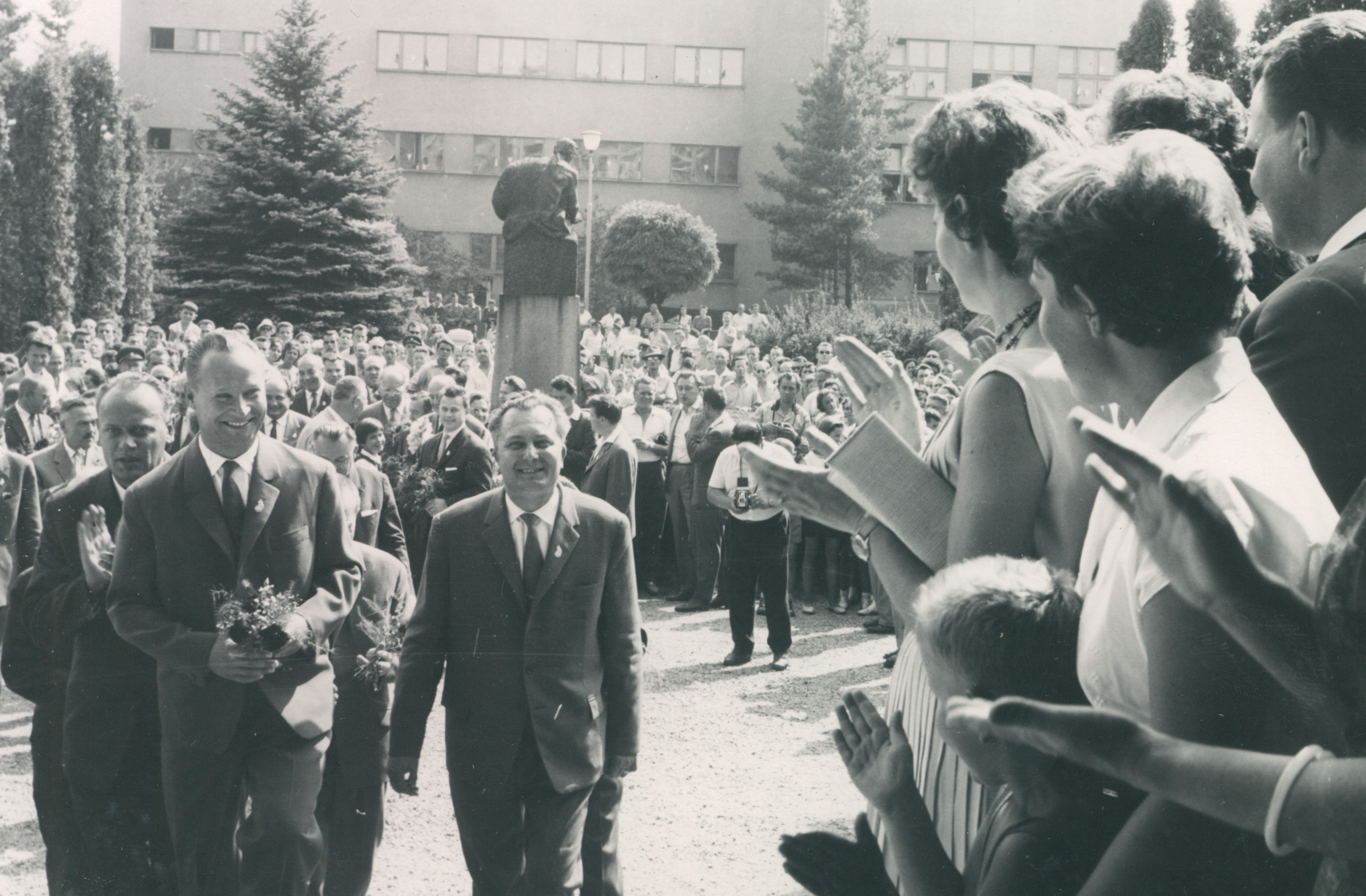
Alexander Dubček in Slovak Matica

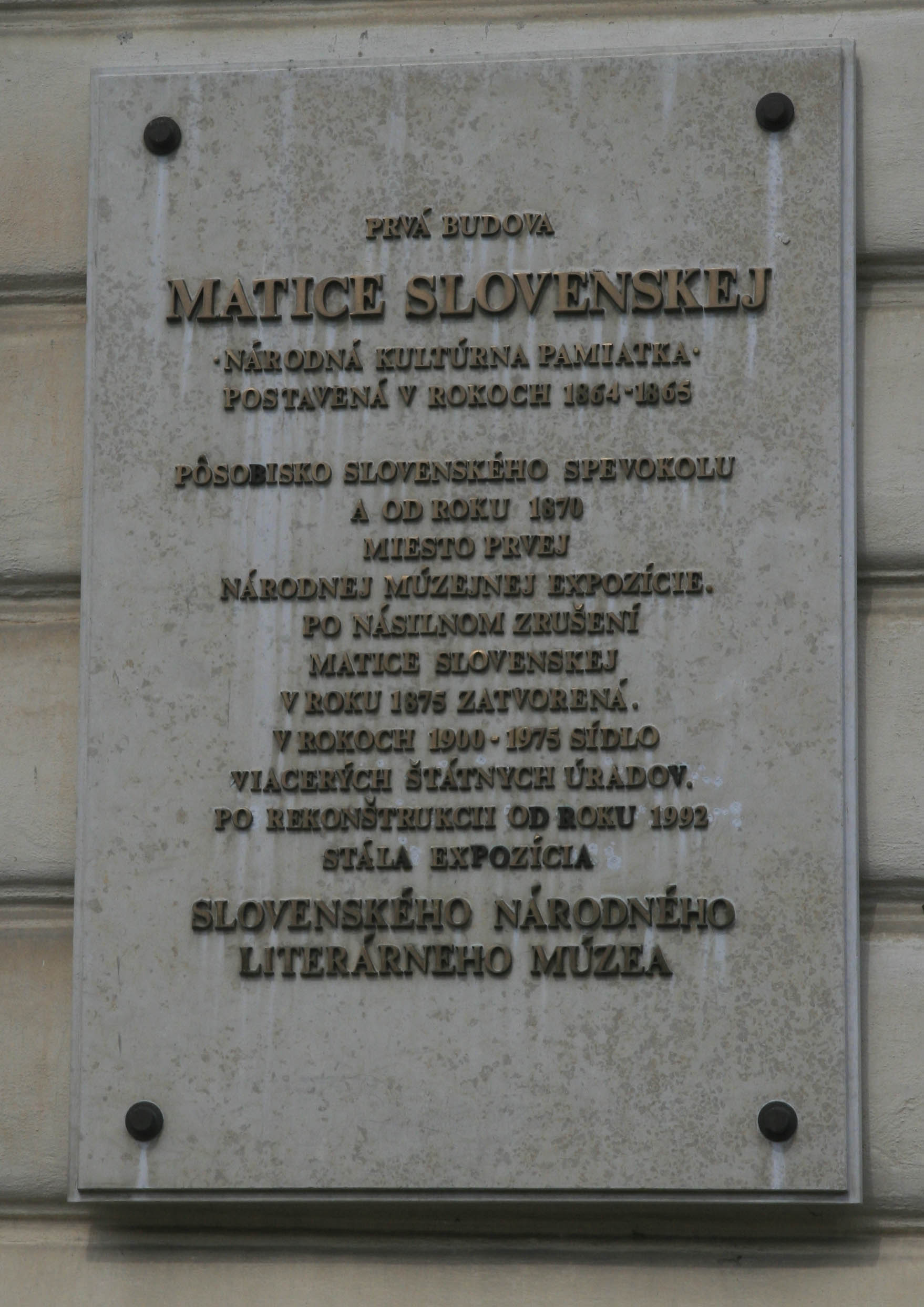
Matica slovenska memorial tablet at first building of Slovak Matice

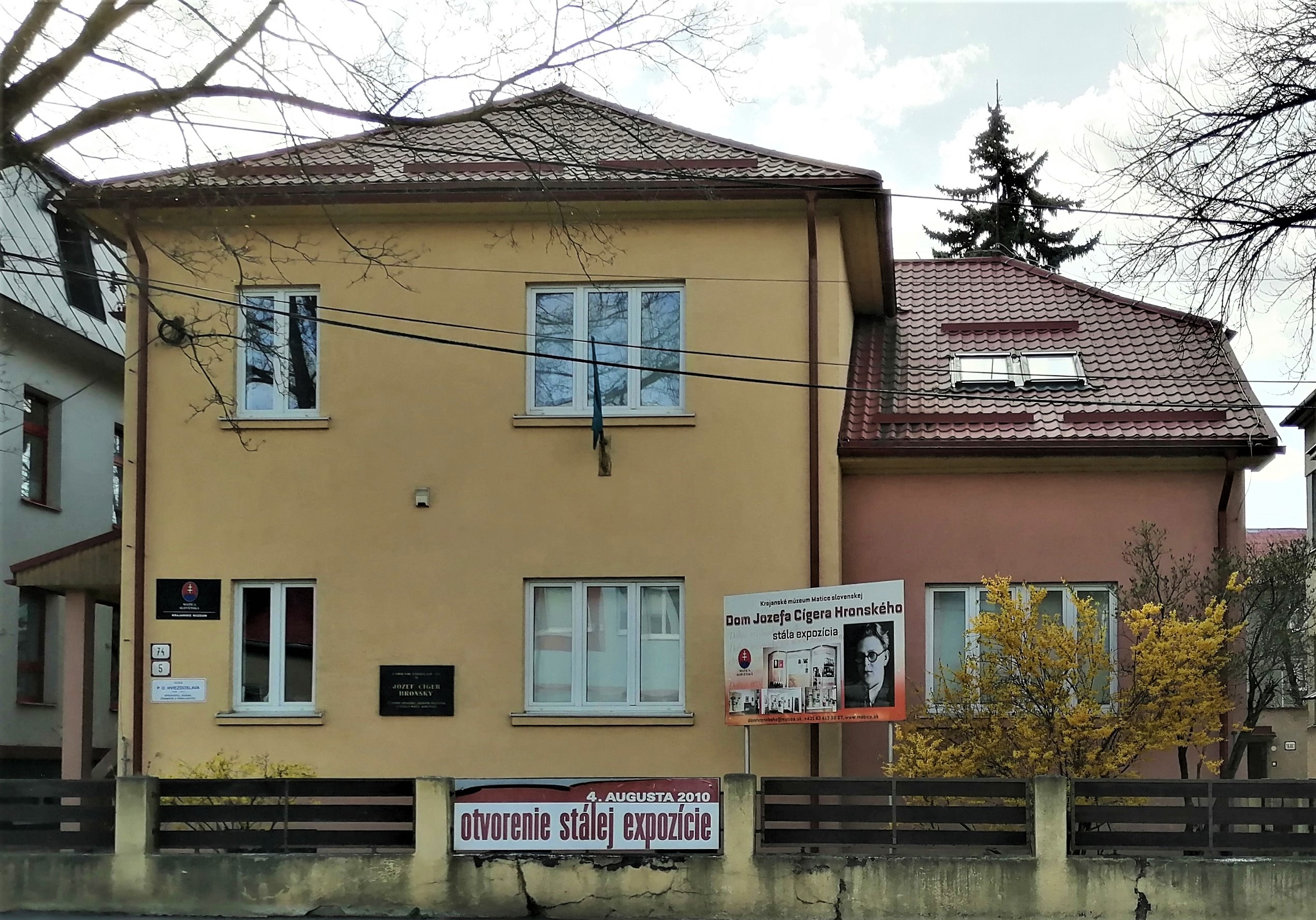
House of Jozef Cíger Hronský in Martin

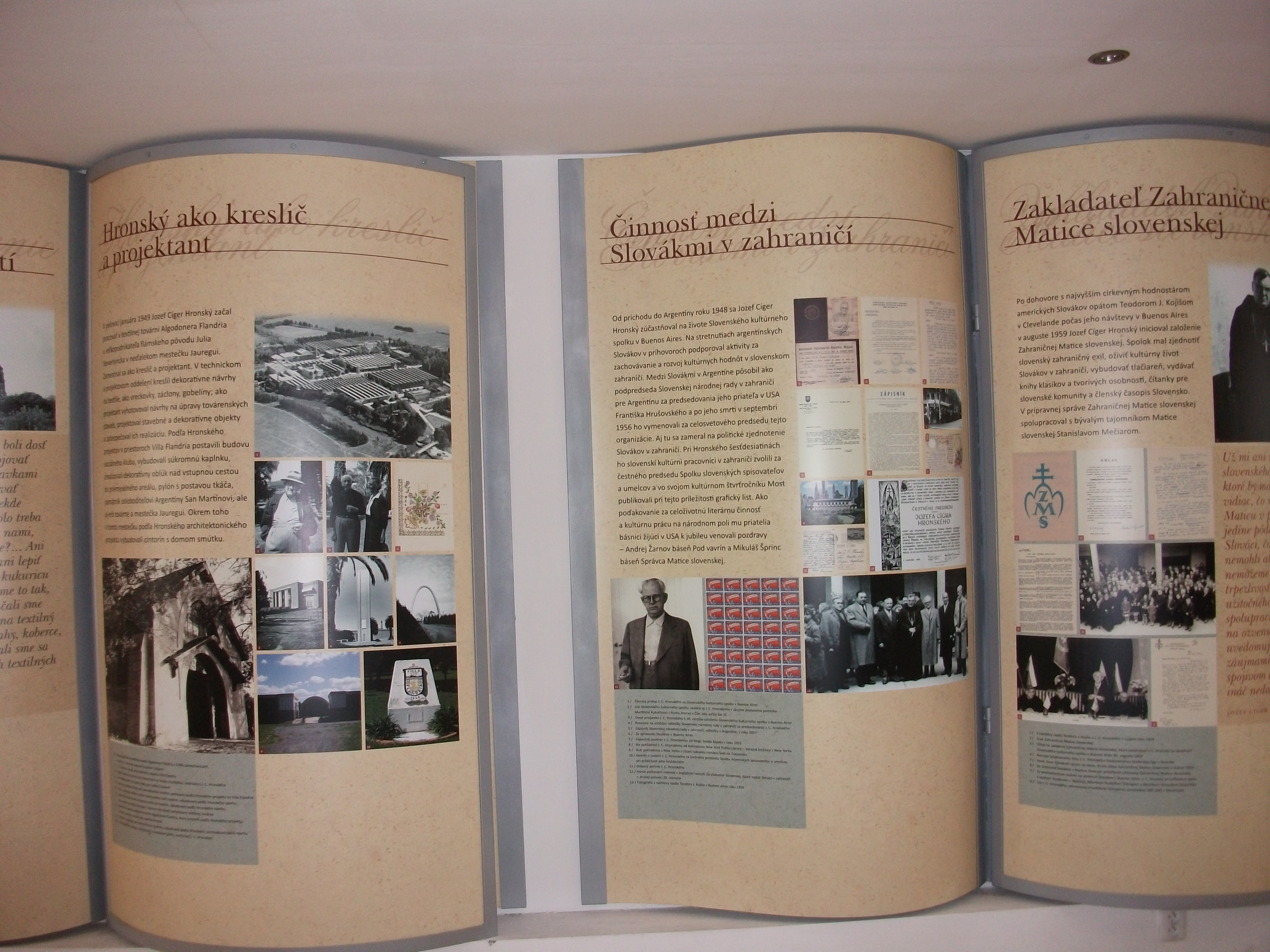
Exposition Jozef Cíger Hronský "Life without rest"

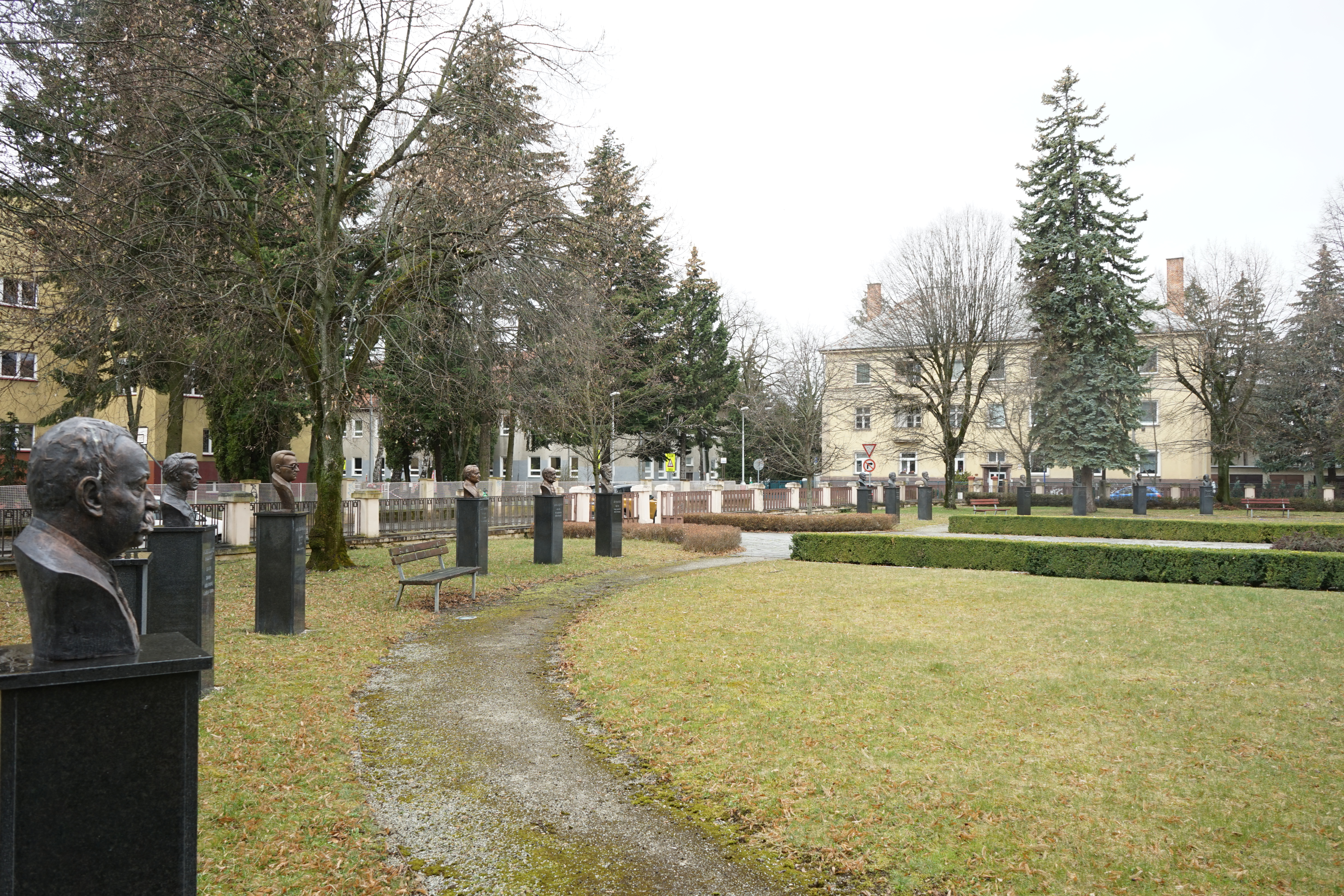
St. Cyril and St. Method Park

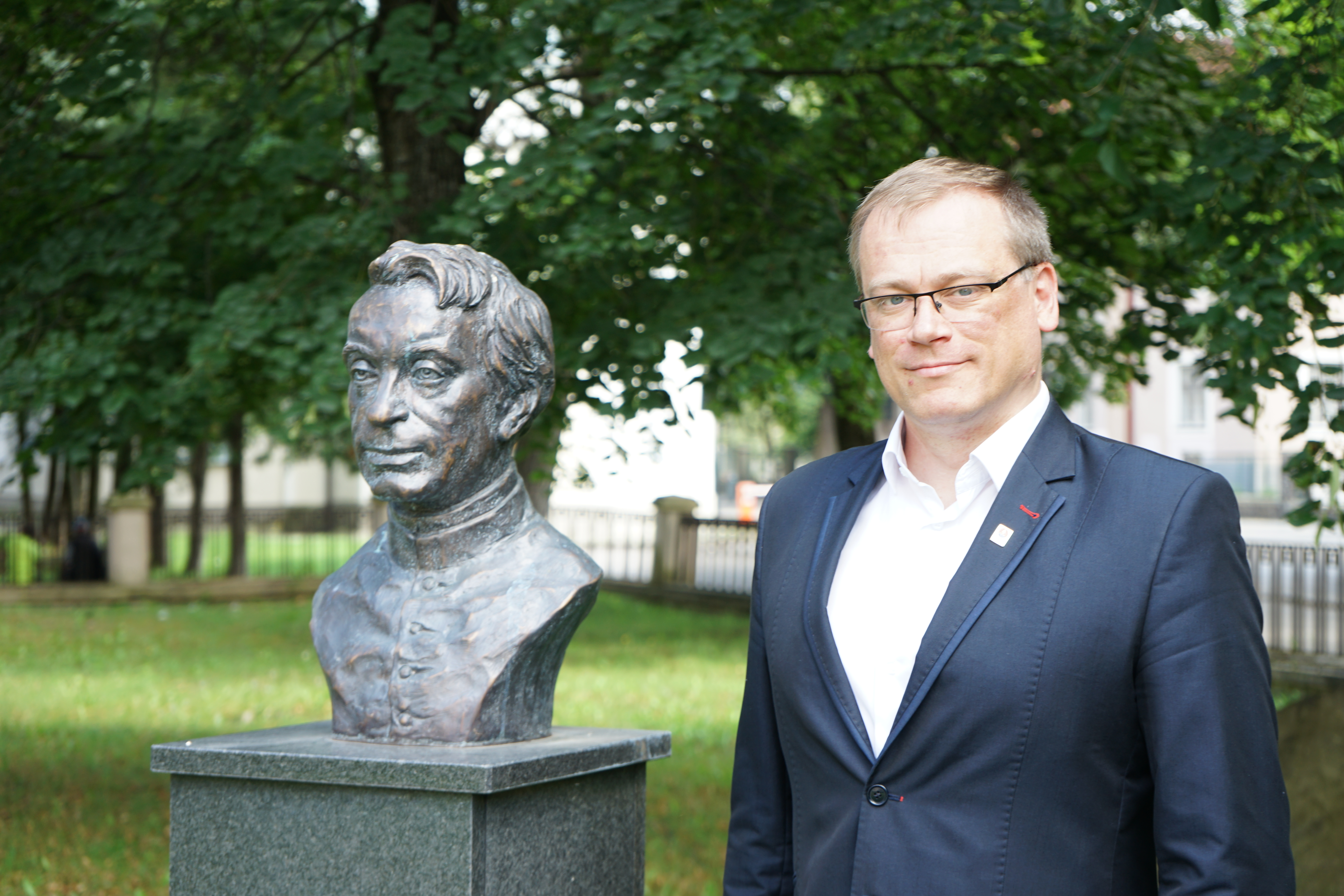
Chairman of Matica slovenská, in Alley of National Awakeners

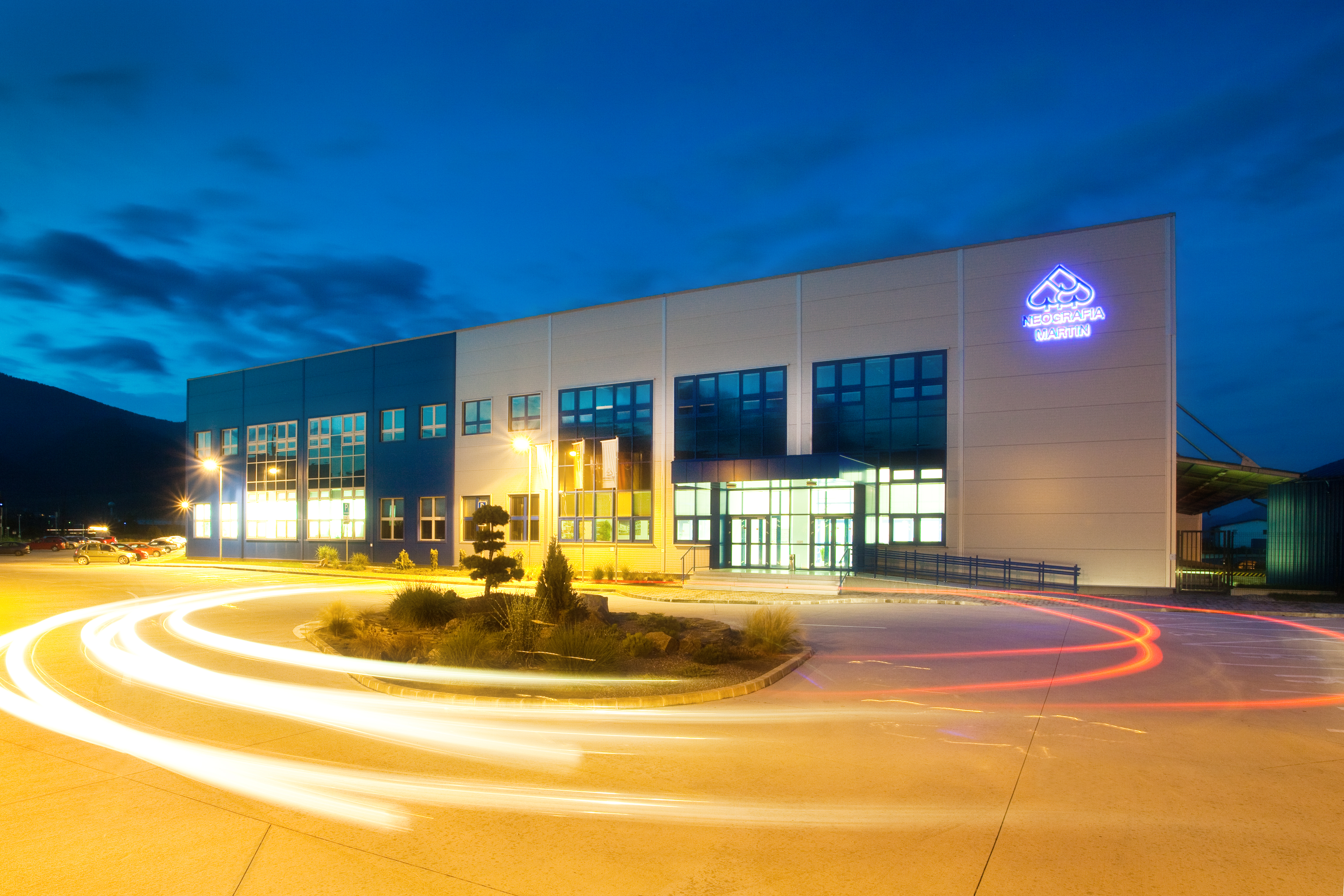
Presentday Neografia

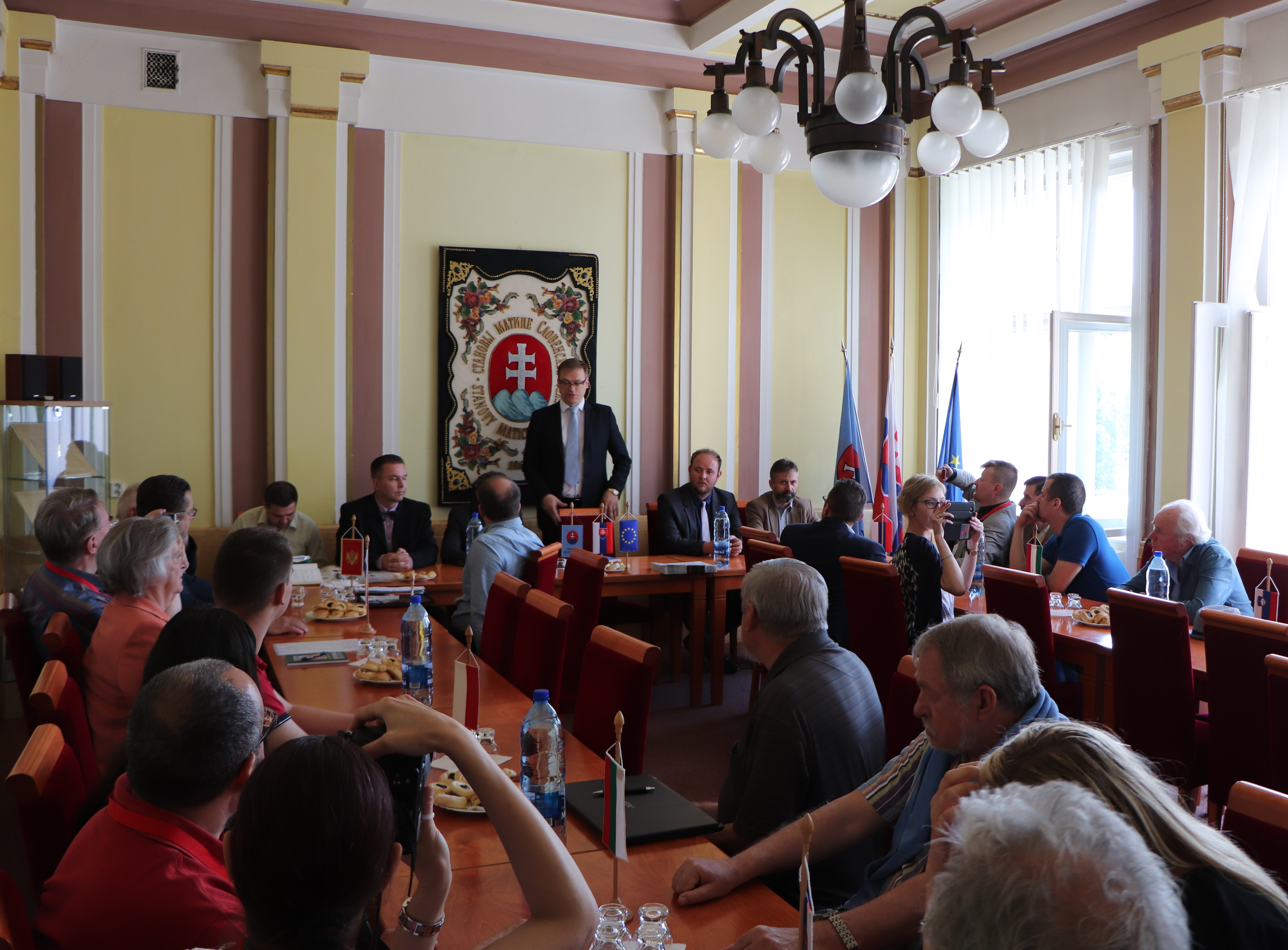
Congress of Maticas and institutions of the Slavic peoples in 2019

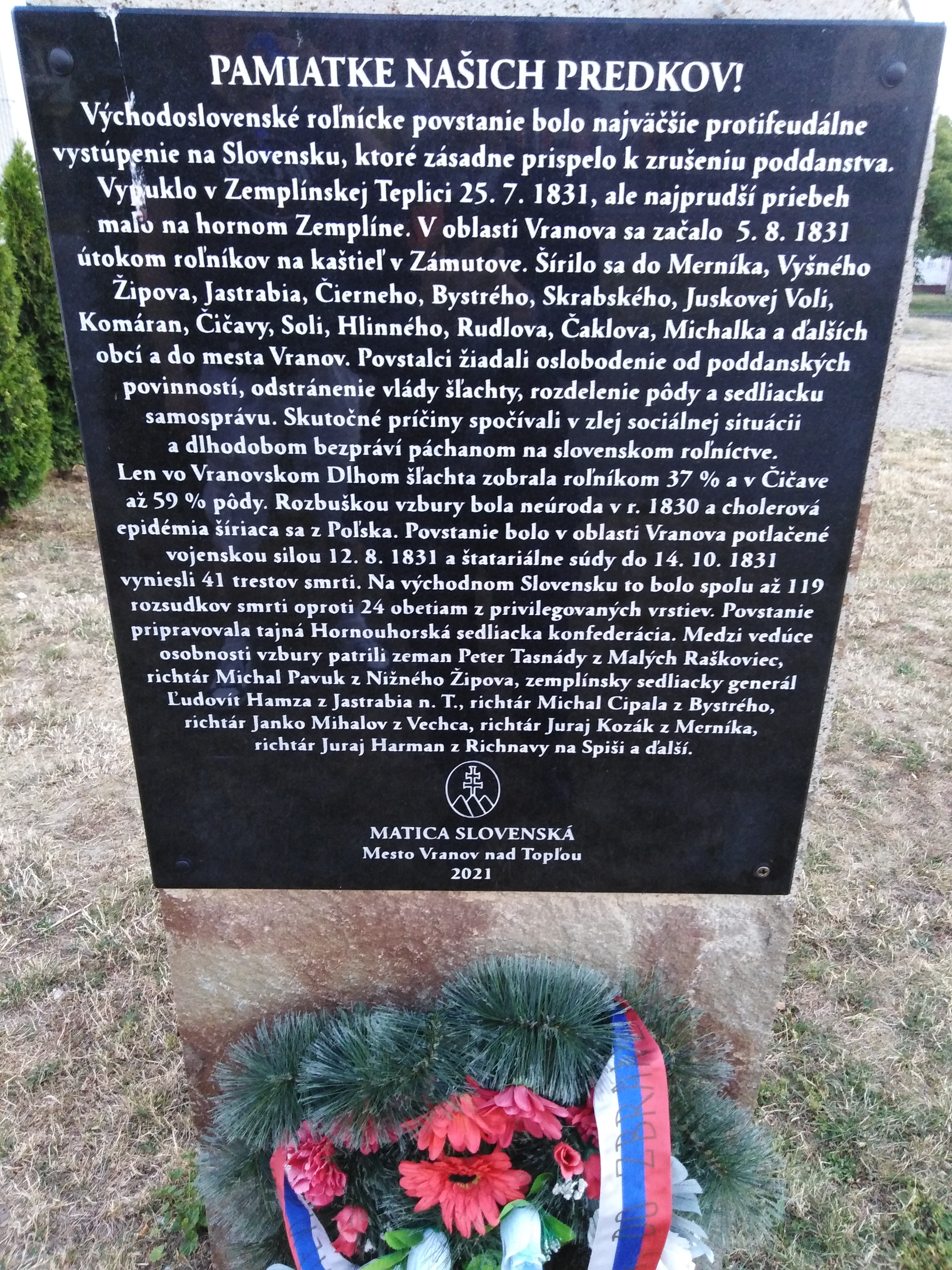

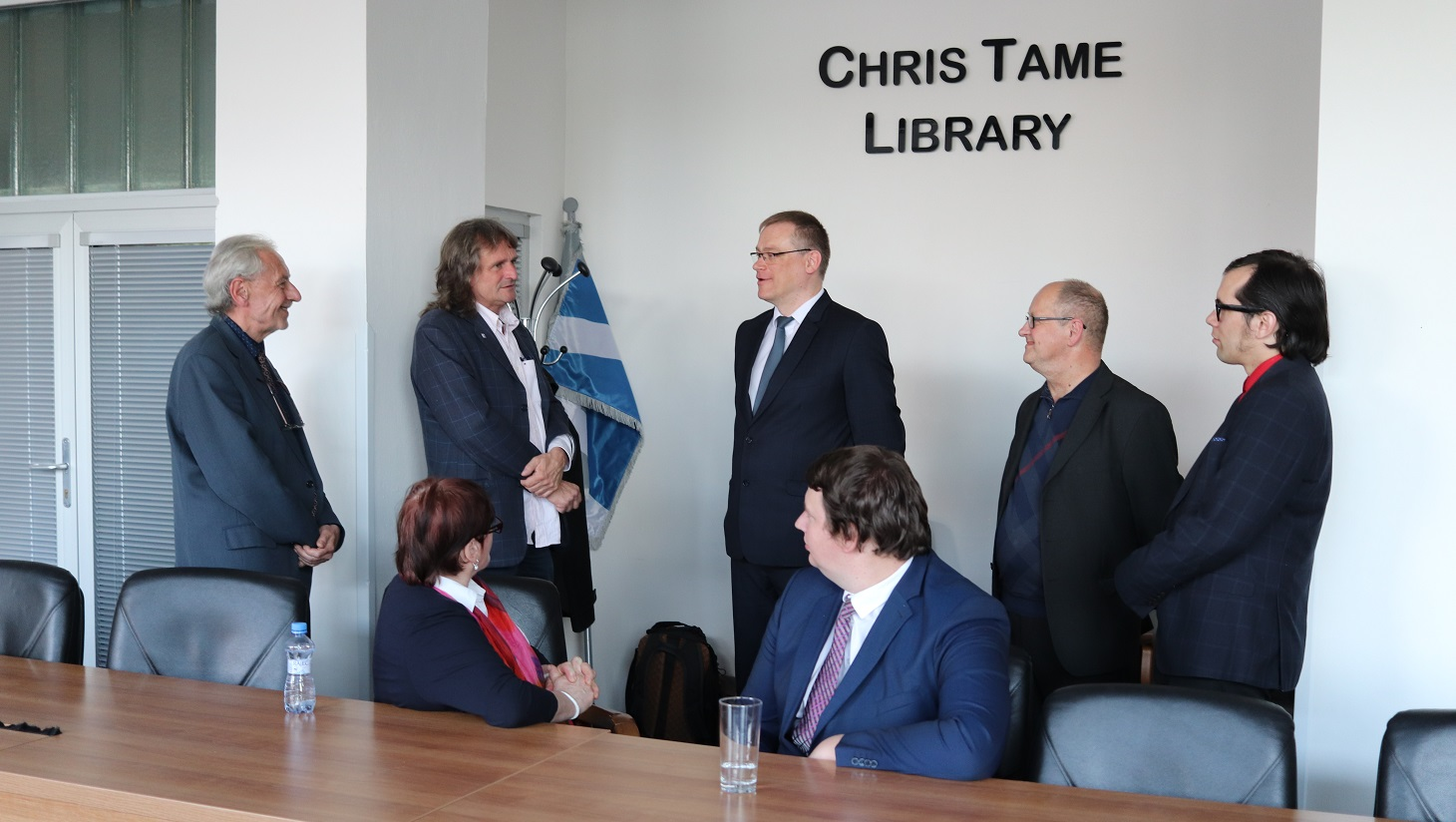
Conference Between Slovak and Czech Philosophy in Prague (Matica Slovak, University of Economics), May 2022. Left: doc. Pavlík, doc. Ševčík, Dr. Gešper, doc. Lomenčík, Dr. Perný

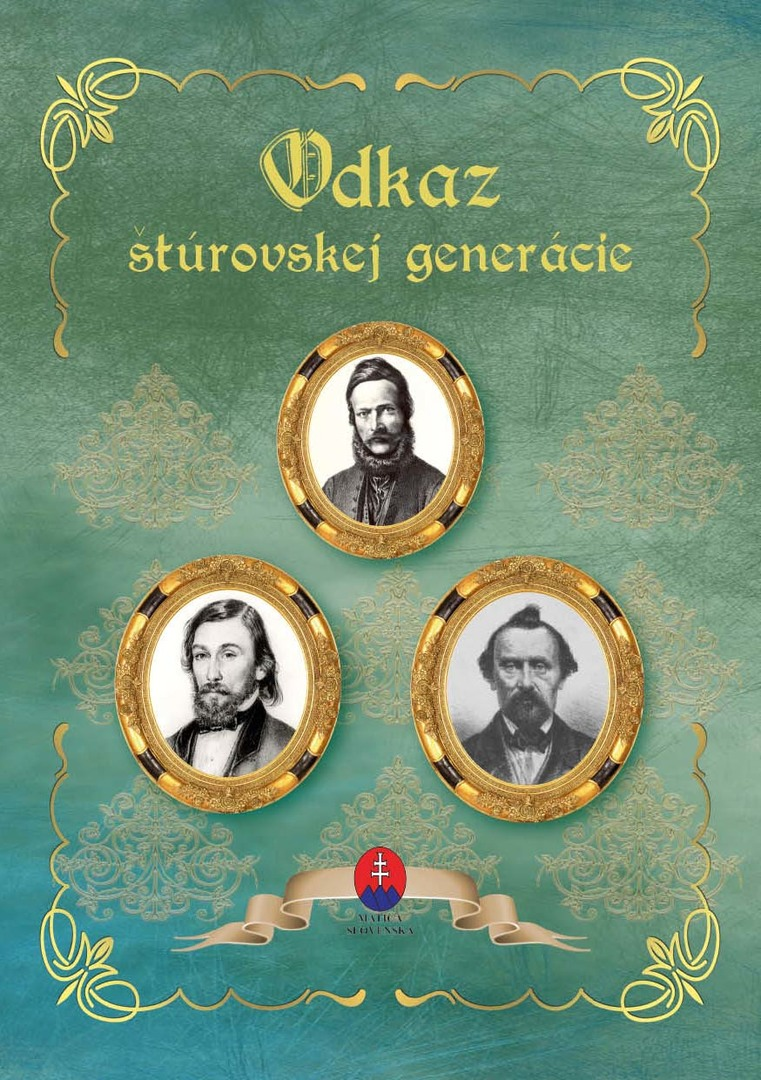
The cover of the brochure for the exhibition The Legacy of the Štúr's Generation

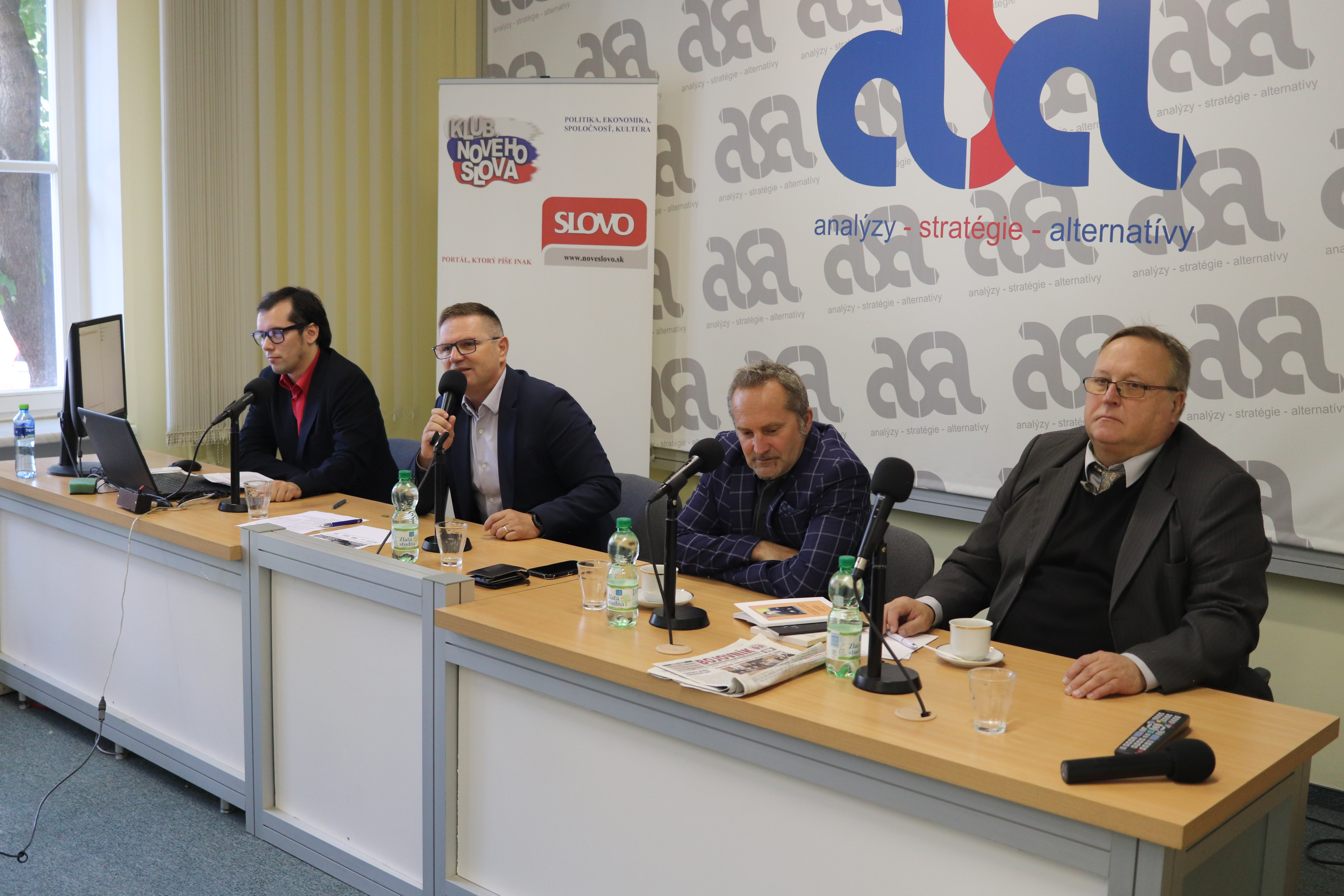
Conference on the 120th anniversary of Vladimír Clementis and the 100th anniversary of Vladimír Mináč (ASA, Nové Slovo, Matica slovenská, SZPB), October 2022

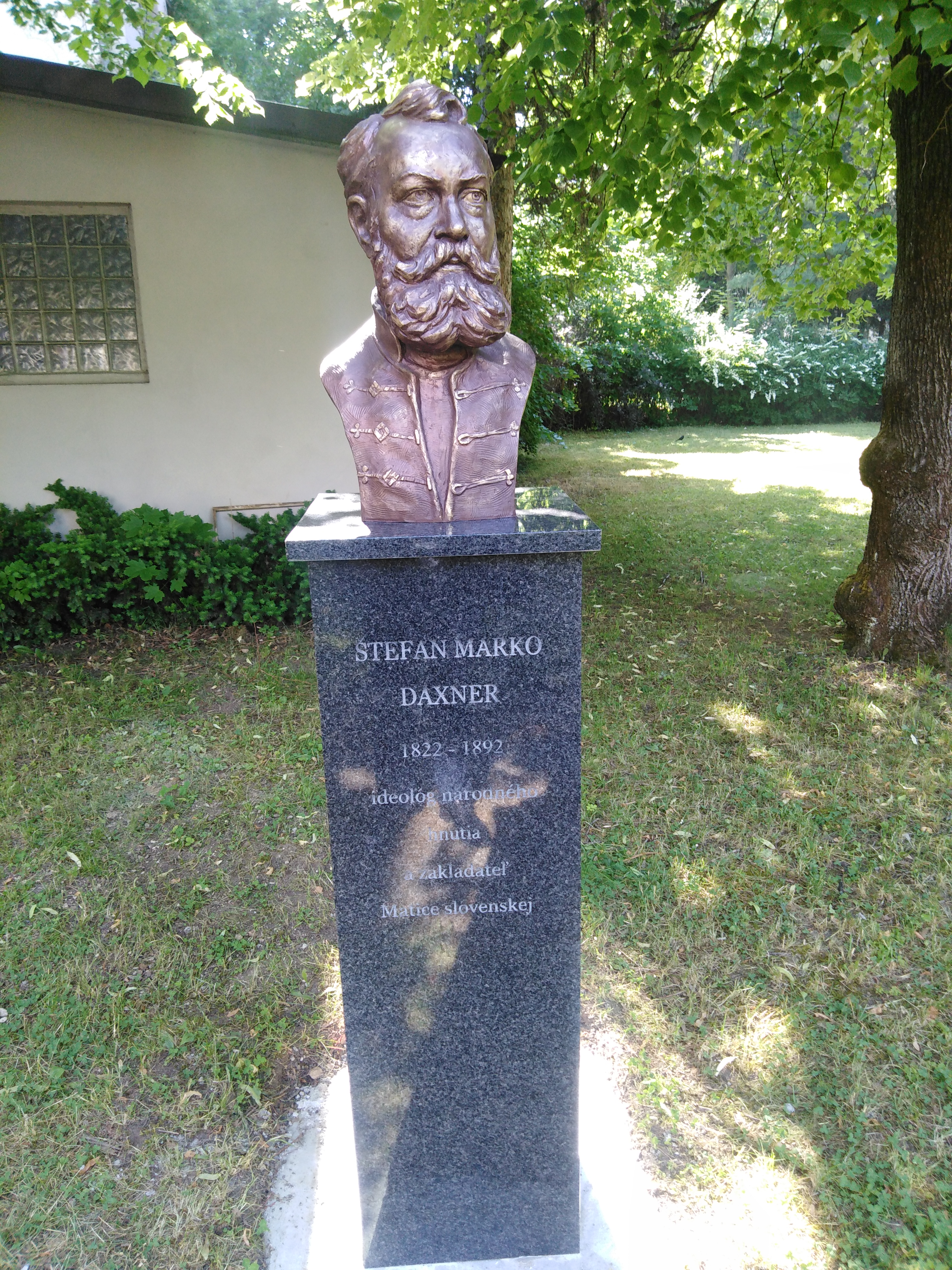
Bust of Štefan Marko Daxner in The Alley of National Awakeners, Martin, Slovakia

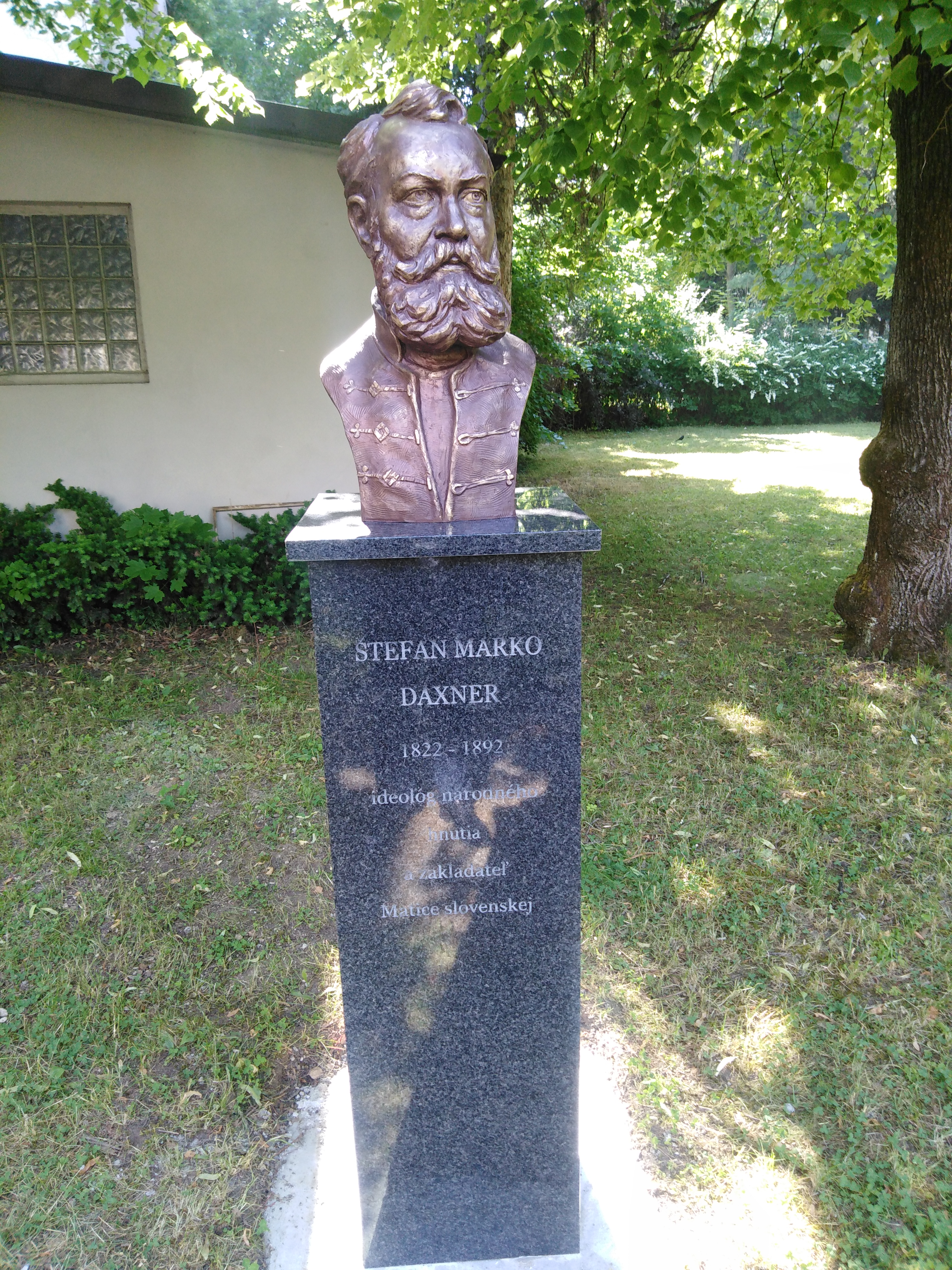
Bust of Štefan Marko Daxner in The Alley of National Awakeners, Martin, Slovakia

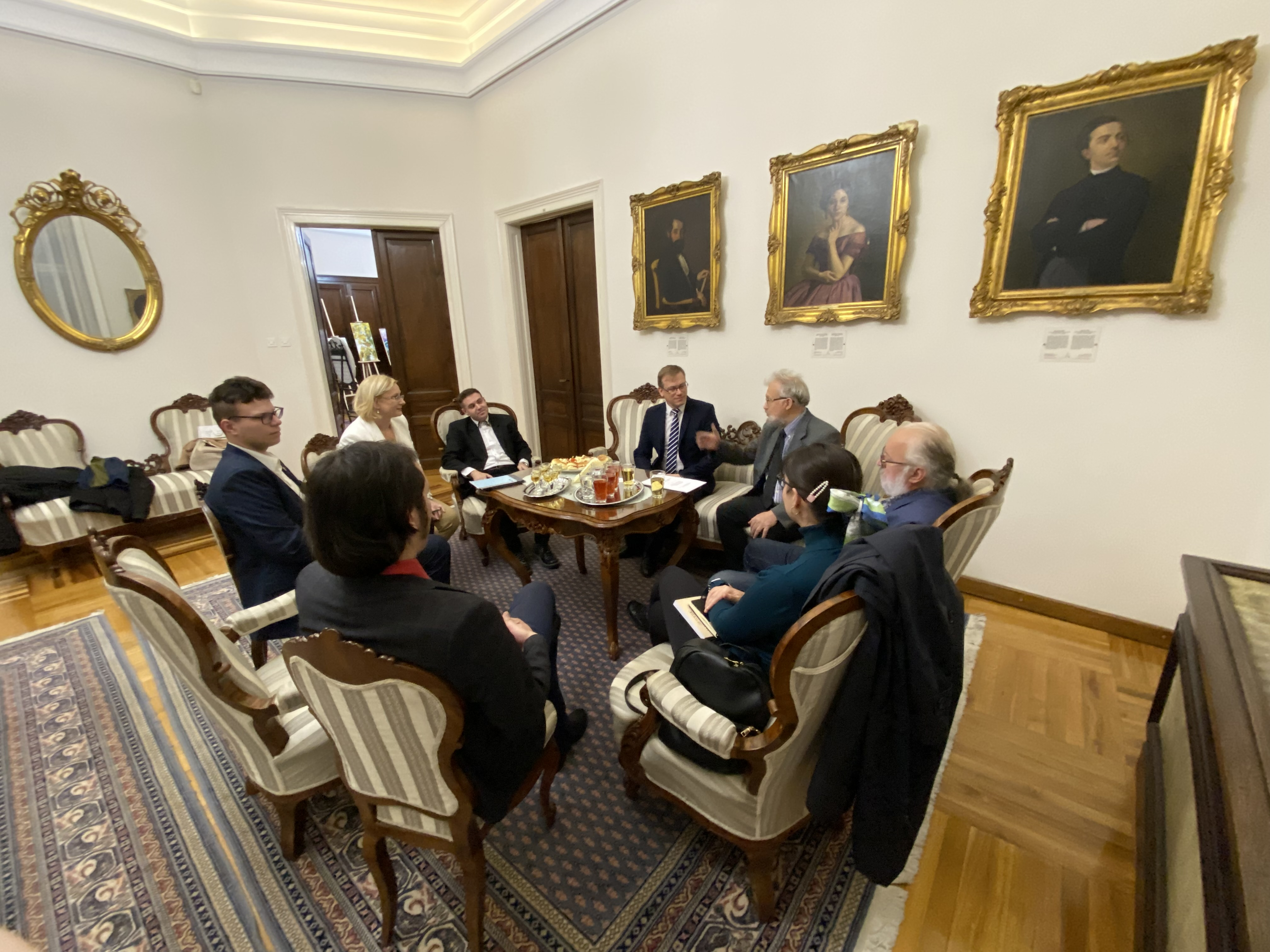
Delegation of Slovak Matica in Serbian Matica with Dragan Stanić

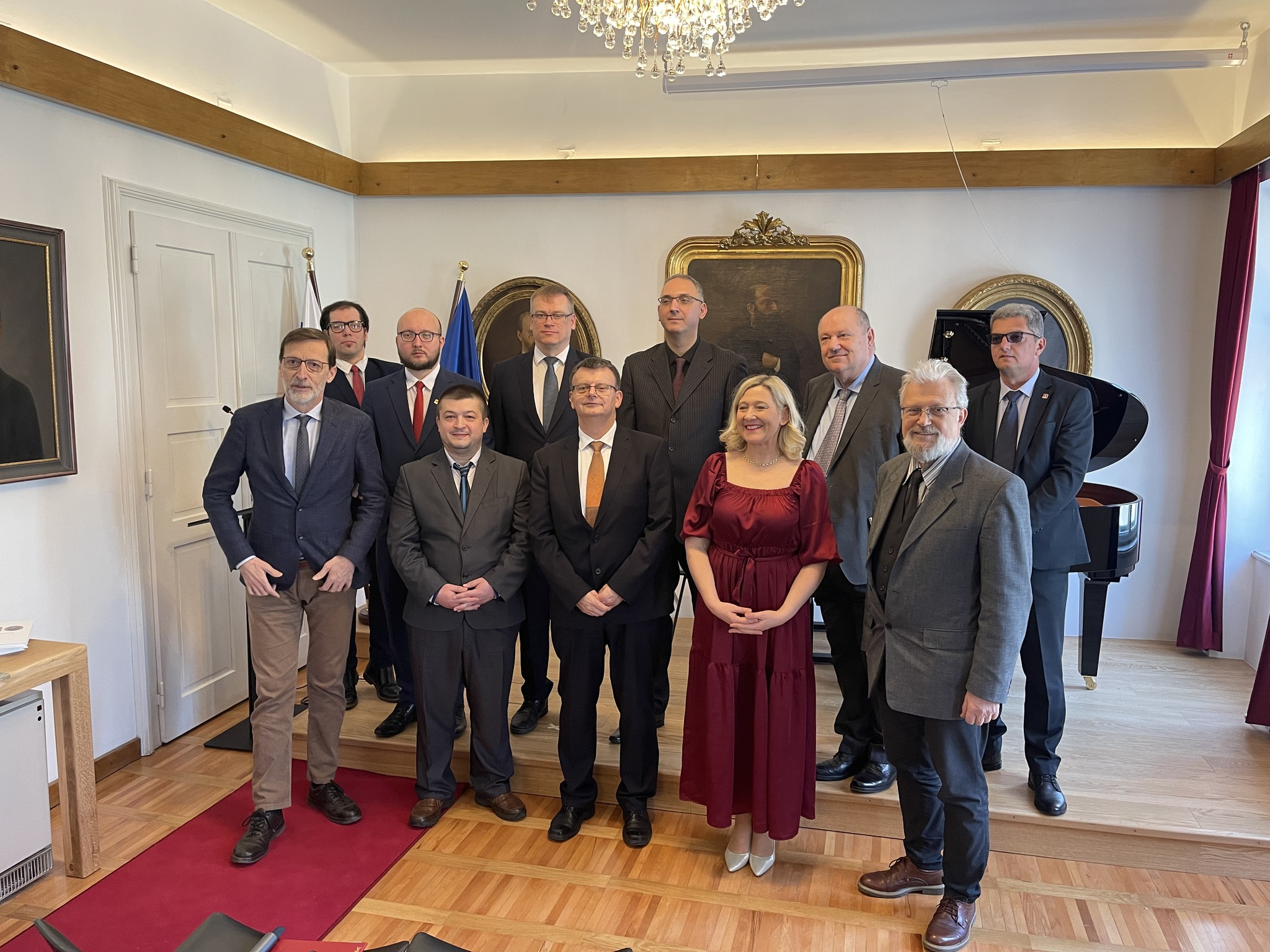
Members and representatives of Slavic Maticas in Ljubljana (Croatian, Slovak, Slovenian, Serbian, Montenegrin)

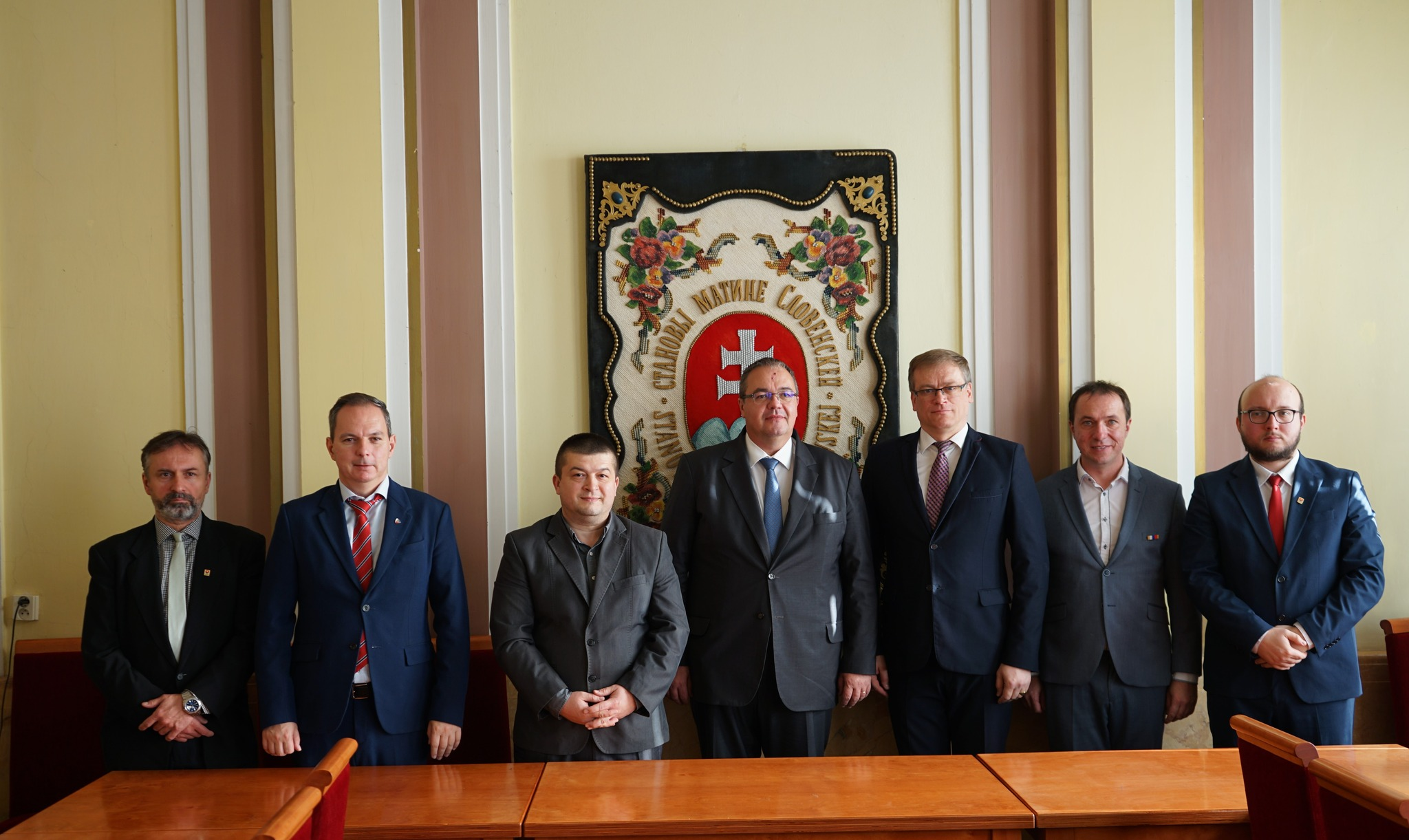
Hungarian Ambassador Csaba Balogh in Slovak Matica

== Chairman of Slovak Matica ==
- 1863–1869: Štefan Moyses (* 1797 – † 1869)
- 1870–1875: Jozef Kozáček (* 1807 – † 1877)
- Since 1919, Slovak Matica has been headed by four chairmen:
- 1922–1930: Matúš Dula (* 1856 – † 1930)
- 1922–1930: Pavol Országh Hviezdoslav (* 1856 – † 1930)
- 1922–1930: František Richard Osvald (* 1856 – † 1930)
- 1922–1930: Vavro Šrobár (* 1856 – † 1930)
- 1922–1930: Jur Janoška (* 1856 – † 1930)
- 1926–1943: Marián Blaha (* 1869 – † 1943)
- 1931–1939: Ján Vanovič (* 1856 – † 1942)
- 1931–1949: Jozef Országh (* 1883 – † 1949)
- 1945–1954: Jur Hronec (* 1881 – † 1959)
- 1945 – 1950 and 1968 – 1974 Chairman of the Slovak Matica, 1974 – 1976 Honorary chairman: Laco Novomeský (* 1904 – † 1976)
- Since 1968, one chairman has headed Slovak Matica:
- 1974–1990: Vladimír Mináč (* 1922 – † 1996)
- 1990: Viliam Ján Gruska (* 1936 – † 2019)
- 1990–2010: Jozef Markuš (1944 – 2025)
- 2010–2017: Marián Tkáč (* 1949)
- from 2017: Marián Gešper (* 1980)

== Publications ==
- BAJANÍK, Stanislav (ed.). Pamätnica: I. európsky kongres matíc slovanských národov. Martin : Matica slovenská, 2007. 119 s. ISBN 978-80-7090-865-5.
- BOTTO, Július. Dejiny Matice slovenskej. Martin : Matica slovenská, 1923. 237 s.
- ELIÁŠ, Michal. Z dejín matíc slovanských národov. Martin : Matica slovenská, 2010. 190 s. ISBN 978-80-7090-970-6.
- ELIÁŠ, Michal – HAVIAR, Štefan. Zlatá kniha Matice slovenskej. Martin : Matica slovenská, 2008. 105 s. ISBN 978-80-7090-875-4.
- ELIÁŠ, Michal – ŠARLUŠKA, Vojtech. Národná svetlica. Martin : Matica slovenská, 1988. 328 s.
- GEGUŠ, Ivan – KOVAČKA, Miloš (ed.). Z vôle ľudu obnovená. Martin : Matica slovenská, 1969. 200 s.
- GEŠPER, Marián – PARENIČKA, Pavol. Predsedovia Matice slovenskej 1863 – 2019. Martin : Matica slovenská, 2019. 167 s. ISBN 978-80-8128-240-9.
- GEŠPER, Marián – PAVELCOVÁ, Zuzana a kol. Pamätnica zo 4. kongresu matíc slovanských národov a inštitúcií slovanských národov, konaného pri príležitosti 100. výročia oživotvorenia Matice slovenskej a podpísania Memoranda národa slovenského. Martin : Matica slovenská, 2020. 358 s. ISBN 978-80-8128-251-5.
- HAVIAR, Štefan – KUČMA, Ivan. V pamäti národa. Martin : Matica slovenská, 1988. 341 s.
- HIRNER, Alexander. Matičná myšlienka. Bratislava: Slovenský spisovateľ, 1992. 392 s. ISBN 80-220-0397-2.
- HOLOTÍK, Ľudovít (ed.). Matica slovenská v našich dejinách. Bratislava: Slovenská akadémia vied, 1963. 431 s.
- KOVÁČ, Mišo A. (ed.). Historický rok. Pamätnica z osláv storočnice Matice slovenskej v roku 1963. Martin : Matica slovenská, 1966. 368 s.
- KOVÁČ, Mišo A. – VONGREJ, Pavol (ed.). Matica slovenská: obrazová pamätnica 1863 – 1963. Martin : Osveta, 1963. 160 s.
- LIBA, Peter. Vydavateľské dielo Matice slovenskej 1863 – 1953: bibliografia s prehľadom. Martin : Matica slovenská, 1963. 551 s.
- MADURA, Pavol. Druhá budova Matice slovenskej. Od myšlienky po súčasnosť. Martin : Matica slovenská, 2019. 176 s. ISBN 978-80-8128-227-0.
- MADURA, Pavol. Miestny odbor Matice slovenskej v Martine v rokoch 1919 – 1950. Prvé ohnivo matičnej reťaze. Martin : Matica slovenská, 2019. 134 s. ISBN 978-80-8128-244-7.
- MULÍK, Peter (ed.). Dvadsať rokov Matice slovenskej. Martin : Matica slovenská, 2010. 130 s. ISBN 978-80-7090-999-7.
- SEDLÁK, Imrich (ed.). Matica slovenská v národných dejinách. Martin : Matica slovenská, 2013. 479 s. ISBN 978-80-8128-086-3.
- SEDLÁK, Imrich. Päťdesiat rokov v slovenskom národnom živote: od spomienok k prameňom. Martin : Matica slovenská, 2011. 224 s. ISBN 978-80-8128-013-9.
- VAGASKÝ, Andrej. Vydavateľská činnosť Matice slovenskej 1953 – 1963. Martin : Matica slovenská, 1964. 339 s.
- WINKLER, Tomáš. Vrastanie do času (Rozprávanie o Matici slovenskej). Martin : Matica slovenská, 2013. 263 s. ISBN 978-80-8128-076-4.
- WINKLER, Tomáš – ELIÁŠ, Michal a kol. Matica slovenská: dejiny a prítomnosť. Martin : Matica slovenská, 2003. 495 s. ISBN 80-7090-694-4.

== See also ==
- Matica crnogorska
- Matica hrvatska
- Matica srpska
- Slovenska matica
