= Štefan Butkovič =

Slovak historian and museologist

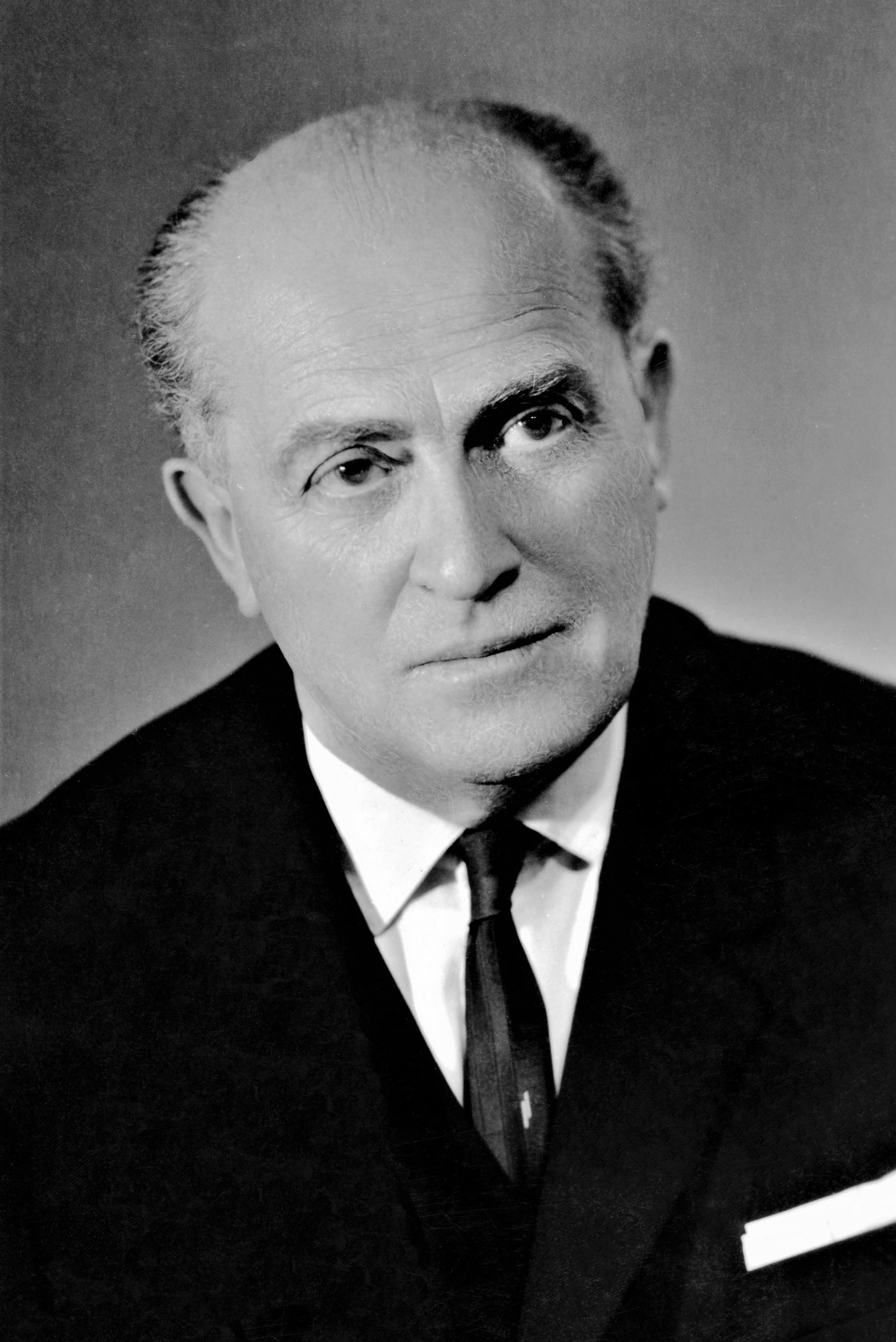
- Born: 20 May 1908; Soľná Baňa, Austria-Hungary
- Died: 21 April 2001 (aged 92)
- Education: Comenius University
- Occupations: Historian, museologist

Štefan Butkovič (20 May 1908 – 21 April 2001) was a Slovak historian and museologist. He was the founder and first director of the Slovak Technical Museum in Košice. He considered communication of scientific and technological progress to the general public one of the key missions of his professional life.

== Early life ==
Štefan Butkovič was born on 20 May 1908 in the salt-mining village of Soľná Baňa, Austria-Hungary (now Solivar, part of Prešov, Slovakia). His father Viktor Butkovič (1880–1947) was a mechanic in a saltworks plant, his mother Katarína, born Fričovská (1872–1932), was a tailor. Soľná Baňa has been known for salt mining since the 16th century. Salt production dramatically changed when the mine was flooded in the 18th century: afterwards the saline brine was extracted using a horse-drawn mechanism (replaced later by an electric pump) and stored in purpose-built buildings. Salt was then obtained from the brine by evaporation in large indoor heated open pans. Štefan Butkovič grew up in this rare industrial environment from an early age and this significantly affected his professional interests.

== Career ==
=== Early career ===
He graduated from Comenius University’s Faculty of Law in Bratislava in 1936 and started to work in an administrative department of the directorate of Slovak state railways in Košice.

=== Slovak Technical Museum ===
In 1947 he became the administrator of technological collections of a former Hungarian museum which were located on the directorate's premises. He moved these collections to one of the central buildings in town, transformed it into a museum and made it available to the public in 1948. In 1954–73 he was the director of this museum, called the Technical Museum, renamed in 1983 to the Slovak Technical Museum. His work enabled it to become one of the key scientific, technological and cultural institutions in Slovakia.

By 1973 the museum had 45 employees. The exhibitions in the original 17 departments were extended by several new ones including those of metallurgy, wireless communication and mining (with a subterranean simulation of a mine). Special focus was on the construction of the astronomical complex, creating the first planetarium in Slovakia. He considered communication of scientific and technological progress a very important activity of the museum. This included demonstration of scientific experiments for schools in the 1950s and 60s, particularly important in the post-war, pre-TV era. The museum presented the first black and white (1953) and colour (1970) television in Košice. It also had a cultural mission: evening concerts of recorded classical music and movie mornings on Sundays were very popular.

One of his key ideas was that a museum should not only be a collection of exhibits but that it should interact with visitors in a dynamic way. In his role as museum director he used his experience from visiting renowned museums in Vienna, Munich, Paris, London, Rome, Budapest, Moscow and several museums in Italy.

In 1964 the museum started to open external departments such as the museum of photography in the birthplace of J. M. Petzval (mathematician, physicist and an early pioneer of photography) in Spišská Belá; a finery forge in Medzev; and later the reconstructed complex for open-pan production and storage of salt in Solivar, which became a national heritage site in 2008. He campaigned for the conservation of the smelter in Vlachovo and the portal of opal mines at Dubník, near Červenica. Among other activities, Štefan Butkovič compiled catalogues of sundials and sacral iron works in Slovakia.

=== Administration and museum philosophy ===
In 1956 he became the head of the Association of Slovak Museums and in this role attended the 4th general conference of the International Council of Museums in Switzerland. As a member of the Central Museum Council in Prague, and later in Bratislava, he participated in solving conceptual issues of museums and in the preparation of legislation governing the activities of museums in Czechoslovakia.

He pursued the idea that the museum should be a research institution. His own main research interest was in the history of mining in Slovakia and he obtained his research degree on the subject of the history of quicksilver production in Slovakia. It emerged from his research that in a relatively small area of Slanské Hills a remarkable variety of minerals (salt, opal, gold and mercury) had been mined and produced in the past. Part of his research was devoted to the exploration of lives and achievements of internationally recognised scientists and inventors of Slovak origin (Samuel Mikovíni, Jozef Maximilián Petzval, Aurel Stodola, Maximilián Hell, Andrej Kmeť, Jozef Murgaš and Štefan Banič).

=== Research ===
He published the results of his research (in Slovak) in monographs Tracing quicksilver production in Slovakia, History of the Slovak precious opal from Dubník and History of salt production in Solivar and in more than 30 research and specialist papers

== Awards ==
Among many prizes he was awarded is the Andrej Kmeť prize for his lifetime achievements in museology.

== Personal life ==
His wife Marta was the youngest daughter of the inventor Robert Michl, author of the international patents for the electric clock in 1929 and director of the first power station in Košice, who was in charge of the electrification of the city. Marta, originally a French teacher, worked for many years as a librarian in the East Slovak Museum in Košice. They had three children: Monika, Eva and Peter.
