= National Cemetery in Martin =

Cemetery in Slovakia

National Cemetery
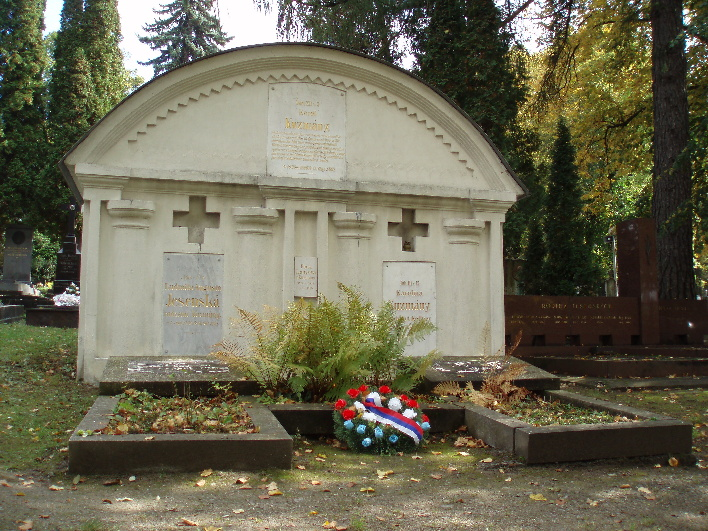
- Interactive map of National Cemetery

Details
- Established: 1780
- Location: Martin, Slovakia
- Coordinates: 49°03′38″N 18°55′33″E
- Type: Public
- Owned by: Slovak National Literary Museum
- Website: www.narodnycintorin.com

The National Cemetery (Slovak: Národný cintorín) is a cemetery in Martin, Slovakia. It is the final resting place of many important personalities of Slovak history.

== List of notable burials ==
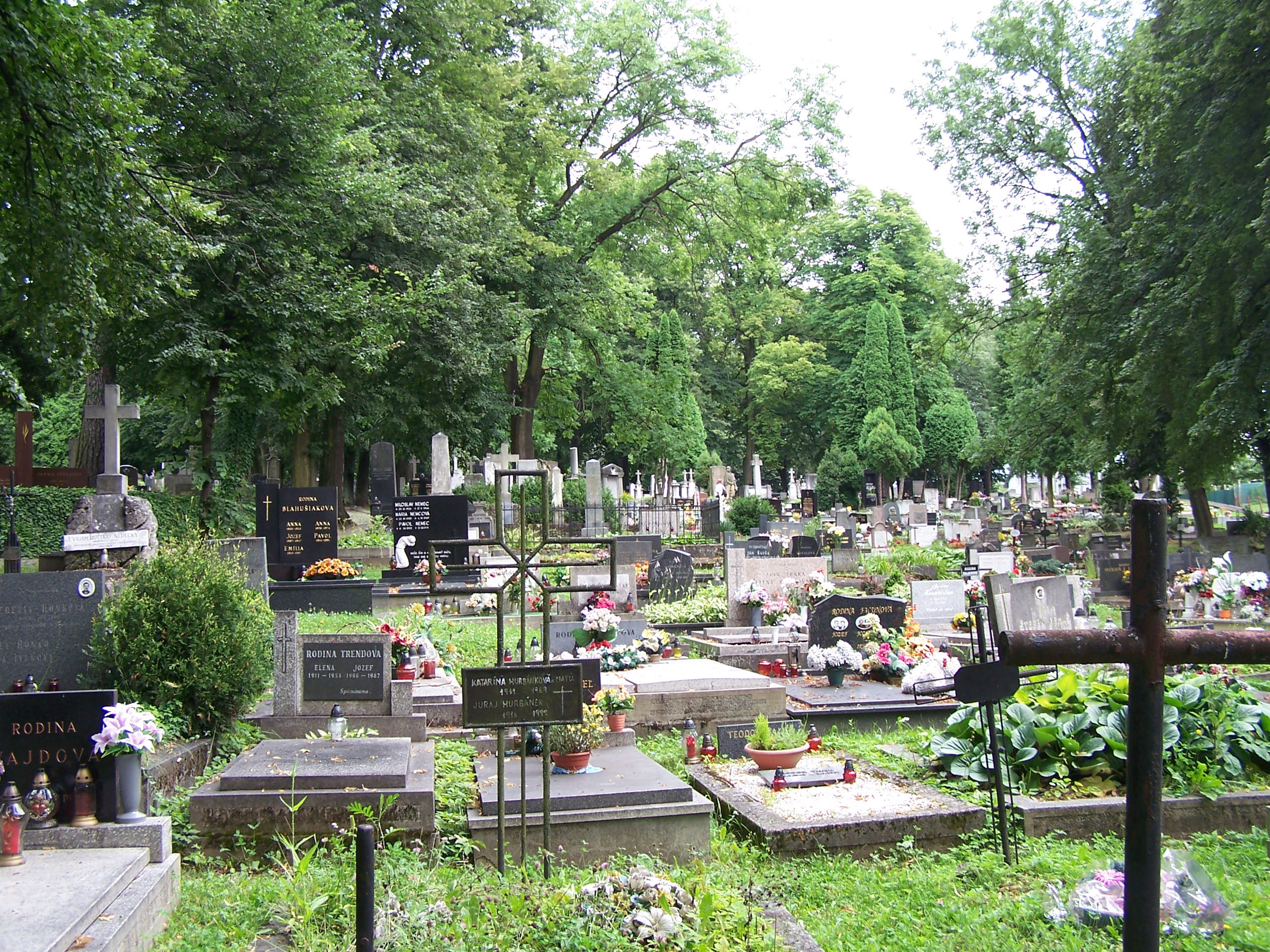
National Cemetery in Martin

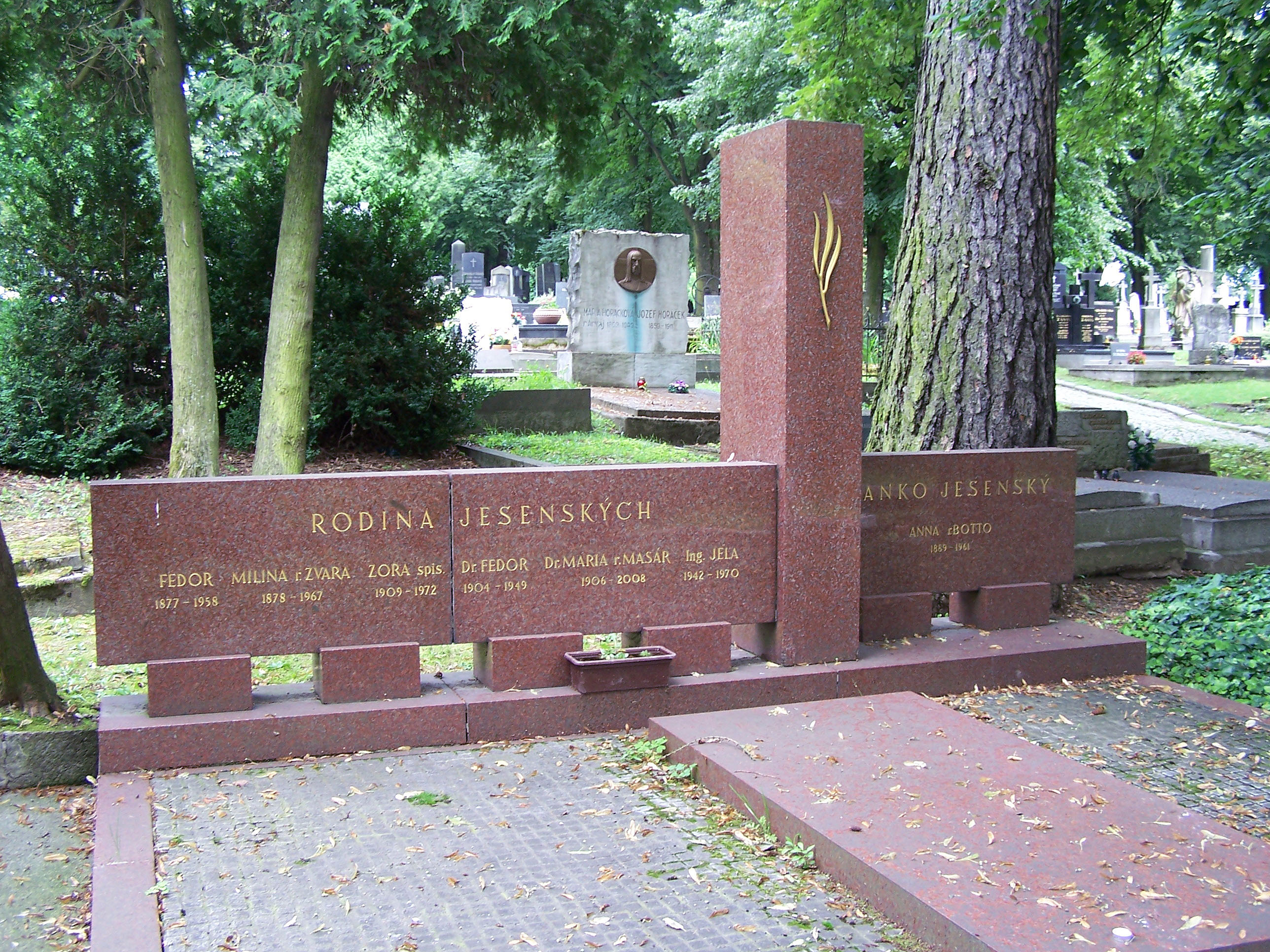
Grave of Janko Jesenský

- Mária Bellová (1885–1973), medical doctor
- Martin Benka (1888–1971), painter
- Jozef Cíger-Hronský (1896–1960), writer
- Ferdinand Čatloš (1895–1972), military leader and politician
- Samuel Czambel (1856–1909), linguist
- Štefan Marko Daxner (1822–1891), activist
- Ján Francisci-Rimavský (1822–1905), activist
- Mikuláš Galanda (1895–1938), painter and illustrator
- Andrej Halaša (1852–1913), translator and cultural activist
- Maša Haľamová (1908–1995), poet
- Naďa Hejná (1906–1994), actress
- Milan Hodža (1878–1944), politician, prime minister of Czechoslovakia in 1935–1938
- Svetozár Hurban-Vajanský (1847–1916), writer
- Janko Jesenský (1874–1945), writer
- Andrej Kmeť (1841–1908), priest, botanist and archaeologist
- Janko Kráľ (1822–1876), poet
- Štefan Krčméry (1892–1955), poet and literary critic
- Martin Kukučín (1860–1928), writer and dramatist
- Karol Kuzmány (1806–1866), writer and theologian
- Štefan Kvietik (1934–2025), actor and politician
- Jozef Lettrich (1905–1969), politician
- Elena Maróthy-Šoltésová (1855–1939), writer
- Hana Meličková (1900–1978), actress
- Karel Plicka (1894–1987), photographer and film director
- Daniel Rapant (1897–1988), historian
- Vladimír Roy (1885–1936), poet and translator
- Miloslav Schmidt (1881–1934), organiser of the fire-brigade movement
- Pavol Socháň (1862–1941), photographer and writer
- Fraňo Štefunko (1903–1974), sculptor
- Ivan Stodola (1888–1977), dramatist and writer
- Izabela Textorisová (1866–1949), botanist
- Ján Valašťan Dolinský (1892–1965), composer and esperantist
