= Halasa (disambiguation) =

Halasa may refer to:

== Surname ==
- Adel F. Halasa (1933–2026), American scientist
- Andrej Halaša (1852–1913), Slovak academic translator
- Ghalib Halasa (932–1989), Jordanian novelist, short-story writer, literary critic, translator, and political activist

== Places ==
- Elusa (Haluza)
- Al-Khalasa
