= Štefan Krčméry =

Slovak writer and academic

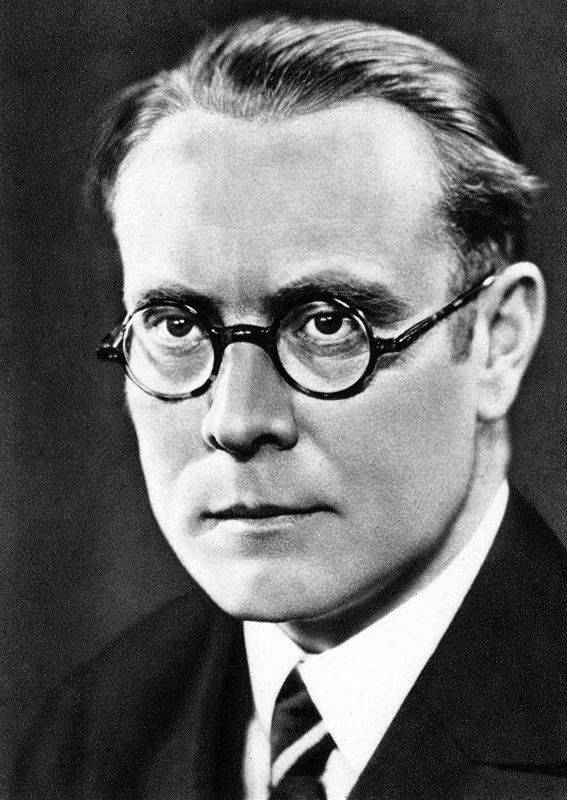
- Slovak poet, journalist, literary critic and translator
- Born: 26 December 1892; Mosóc, Kingdom of Hungary (today Mošovce, Slovakia)
- Died: 17 February 1955 (aged 62); Pezinok, Czechoslovakia

Štefan Krčméry (pseudonyms Eška, Ján Jesom, Ujo Štefan et al.) (26 December 1892 – 17 February 1955) was a Slovak poet, literary critic, historian, journalist, translator, and administrator of Matica slovenská. He was born in Mosóc (present-day Mošovce) and died in Pezinok.

== Life ==
Krčméry was born to a Lutheran preacher, the son of a member of the Štúr group, August Horislav Krčméry. He went to primary school in Jasenová (then Alsójeszenő), secondary school in Banská Bystrica (then Besztercebánya), and attended a Lutheran lyceum ( from 1907 to 1911) in Bratislava, where he also studied Lutheran theology (1911–1915).

For some time he worked as chaplain in Krajné (then Krajna) and in Bratislava (then Pozsony), but then left preaching and started working as a literary critic, journalist, poet, historian, theoretician, and organizer of Slovak cultural and awareness activities. From 1918 to 1919 Krčméry edited Národné noviny, worked as the editor-in-chief of Slovenské pohľady, and acted as secretary to the reinstated Matica slovenská. From 1920 to 1921 Krčméry undertook a studying trip to Paris together with his wife Hela. Upon his return, he again worked as the secretary of Matica slovenská and was the editor of the renewed Slovenské pohľady (1922–1932), Knižnica Slovenských pohľadov, and temporarily also Slovenský ochotník, Naše divadlo, Včielka and other magazines. In 1930 he left for 3 months to Prague, where he took additional courses at the Charles University, and received a PhD.

In the fall of 1931 he began showing symptoms of mental illness, and the next year fell seriously ill. In late 1932 Krčméry stopped editing Slovenské pohľady and in 1933 resigned from the post of secretary of Matica slovenská. However, he did not stop his literary work. He was also a member of several cultural and societal institutions (Matica hrvatska, Provençal Félibrige, Matica srpska etc.). He moved several times, but was undergoing treatment in Pezinok from 1949 until his death. He was buried in Bratislava, but his remains were later transferred to the National Cemetery in Martin.

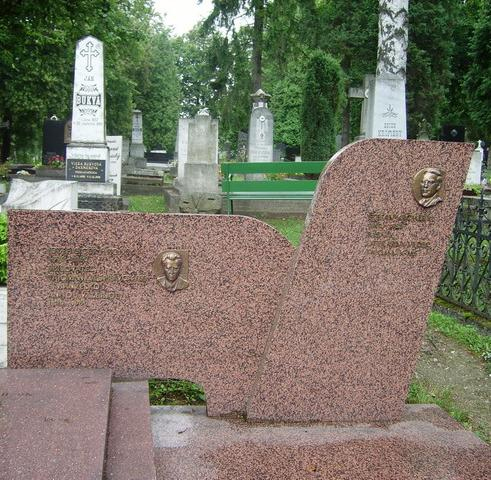
The grave of Štefan Krčméry and Jozef Cíger-Hronský at the National Cemetery in Martin

== Works ==
Krčméry began publishing in 1913, and contributed to several magazines (Slovenské pohľady, Dennica, Živena, Národné noviny, Mladé Slovensko etc.). In addition to critical realism he also used elements of Symbolism; his inspirations included Pavol Országh Hviezdoslav at the Štúr group, as well as European romantic poets. His most important theoretical work is the two-volume history of Slovak literature: 150 Years of Slovak Literature, where he describes many significant personalities of the 18th and 19th centuries.

== List of works ==
=== Poetry ===
- 1920 – Keď sa sloboda rodila, celebrates the creation of Czechoslovakia
- 1929 – Herbárium
- 1930 – Piesne a balady
- 1932 – Slovo čisté
- 1944 – Pozdrav odmlčaného básnika

=== Prose ===
- 1932 – Oslobodenie
- 1957 – Zimná legenda
- 1972 – Ty a Ja, dedicated to his future wife, Hela Karlovská

=== Literary science ===
- 1920 – Prehľad dejín slovenskej literatúry a vzdelanosti
- 1927 – Moyses a Kuzmány
- 1928 – Ľudia a knihy
- 1936 – Zo slovenskej kymnológie
- 1943 – Stopäťdesiat rokov slovenskej literatúry
- 1976 – Dejiny literatúry slovenskej

=== Other works ===
- 1925 – Anthológia szlovák kőltőkből, anthology of Slovak poetry
- 1925 – Salome, translation of Oscar Wilde's rhymed drama
- 1944 – Z cudzích sadov, translation of European poetry
- 1975 – Estetické reflexie

=== Articles, paragraphs, and reflections ===
- 1922 – Slovensko a jeho život literárny
- 1924 – Literárne snahy slovenské
- 1926 – O možnostiach rozvoja slovenskej literatúry
- 1931 – Prozódia štúrovských básnikov
- 1932 – Melódia vety a prízvuk v slovenčine
- 1935 – Estetika krás prírodných

=== Anthologies ===
- 1975 – Estetické reflexie
- 1977 – Román bez konca
