= Izabela Textorisová =

Slovak botanist (1866–1949)

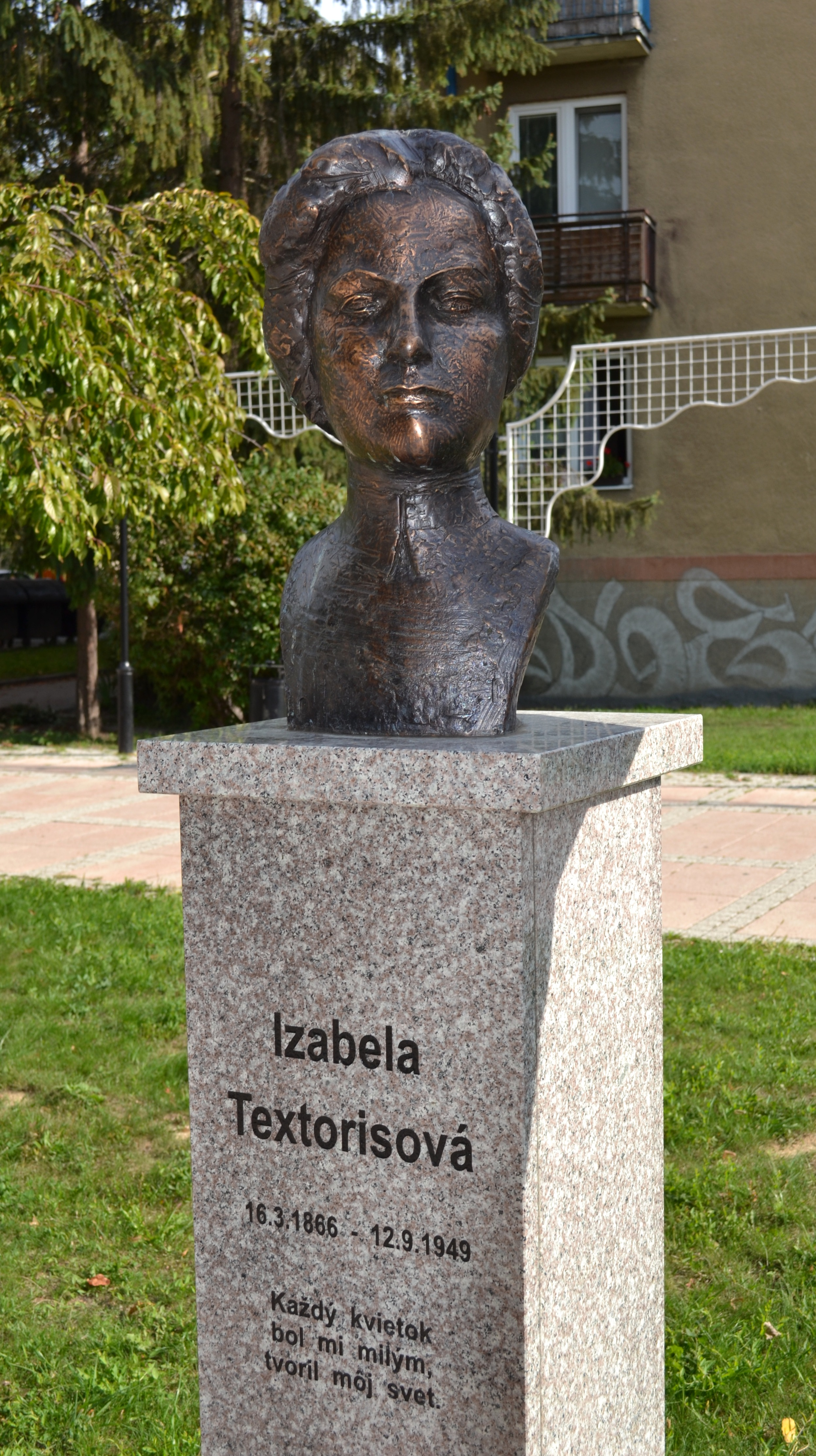
- Bust of Izabela Textorisová
- Born: 16 March 1866; Ratková, Gömör and Kishont County, Kingdom of Hungary
- Died: 12 September 1949 (aged 83); Krupina, Czechoslovakia
- Resting place: National Cemetery in Martin
- Known for: Discovery of Carduus textorisianus (thistle)
- Scientific career
- Fields: Botany

Izabela Textorisová (16 March 1866, Ratková – 12 September 1949, Krupina) was Slovakia's first female botanist. Her copious herbarium, stored at the Faculty of Natural Sciences of Comenius University in Bratislava, is a valuable resource for botanists to this day. She described more than a hundred new plants in the Turiec region. In 1893, she discovered a new species of thistle, later named Carduus textorisianus Marg. in her honor.

A main-belt asteroid, discovered in 2000 by Peter Kušnirák, was also named in her honor.

In 2018, a documentary film about Textorisová's life, titled Rande s Belkou, was produced by CSTISR and broadcast by RTVS in 2020.

== See also ==
- Timeline of women in science
