= Hana Meličková =

Slovak actress (1900–1978)

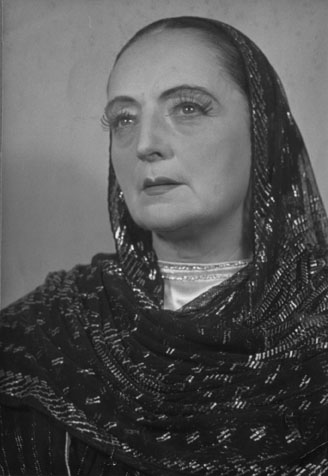
- Meličková as Salome in 1937
- Born: 27 January 1900; Martin, Austria-Hungary
- Died: 7 January 1978 (aged 77); Bratislava, Czechoslovakia
- Burial place: National Cemetery in Martin
- Occupation: Actress
- Years active: 1924–1970

Hana Meličková (27 January 1900 – 7 January 1978) was a Slovak actress. She was the first Slovak professional actress.

== Biography ==
Hana Meličková was born on 27 January 1900 in Martin to an intellectual family with roots in the Gemer region, active in the Slovak Lutheran nationalist circles. She had nine siblings. Her father was a cantor, which motivated young Hana to pursue a musical career. Her mother belonged to minor nobility from the village of Necpaly and was a distant relative of the poet Samo Chalupka.

As a nineteen-year-old, Meličková moved to Prague to study piano, where she secretly enrolled in acting classes. After graduation, she briefly worked as a teacher in Martin, while acting with the local amateur theatre troupe. There, she was discovered by the directors from the Slovak National Theatre in Bratislava, who were captivated by her portrayal of Salome.

In 1926, Meličková joined the Slovak National Theatre as a professional actress. With the exception of the World War II period (1939–1946), Meličková remained at the Slovak National Theatre until she retired in 1970. Over the course of her long tenure she portrayed almost 300 characters. In 1961 she was declared a Merited Artist of Czechoslovakia. In addition to theatre acting, she appeared in several television movies and radio plays.

== Personal life and death ==
Meličková was married to the historian Daniel Rapant, with whom she had two daughters. They resided in the Avion residence complex in the Blumentál neighborhood in Bratislava. She died on 7 January 1978 and was buried at the National Cemetery in Martin. A street in the Dlhé diely neighborhood in Bratislava is named after Meličková. She was featured on a postage stamp in 2000.
