= Stolpersteine in the Banská Bystrica Region =

Memorial installations in Slovakia

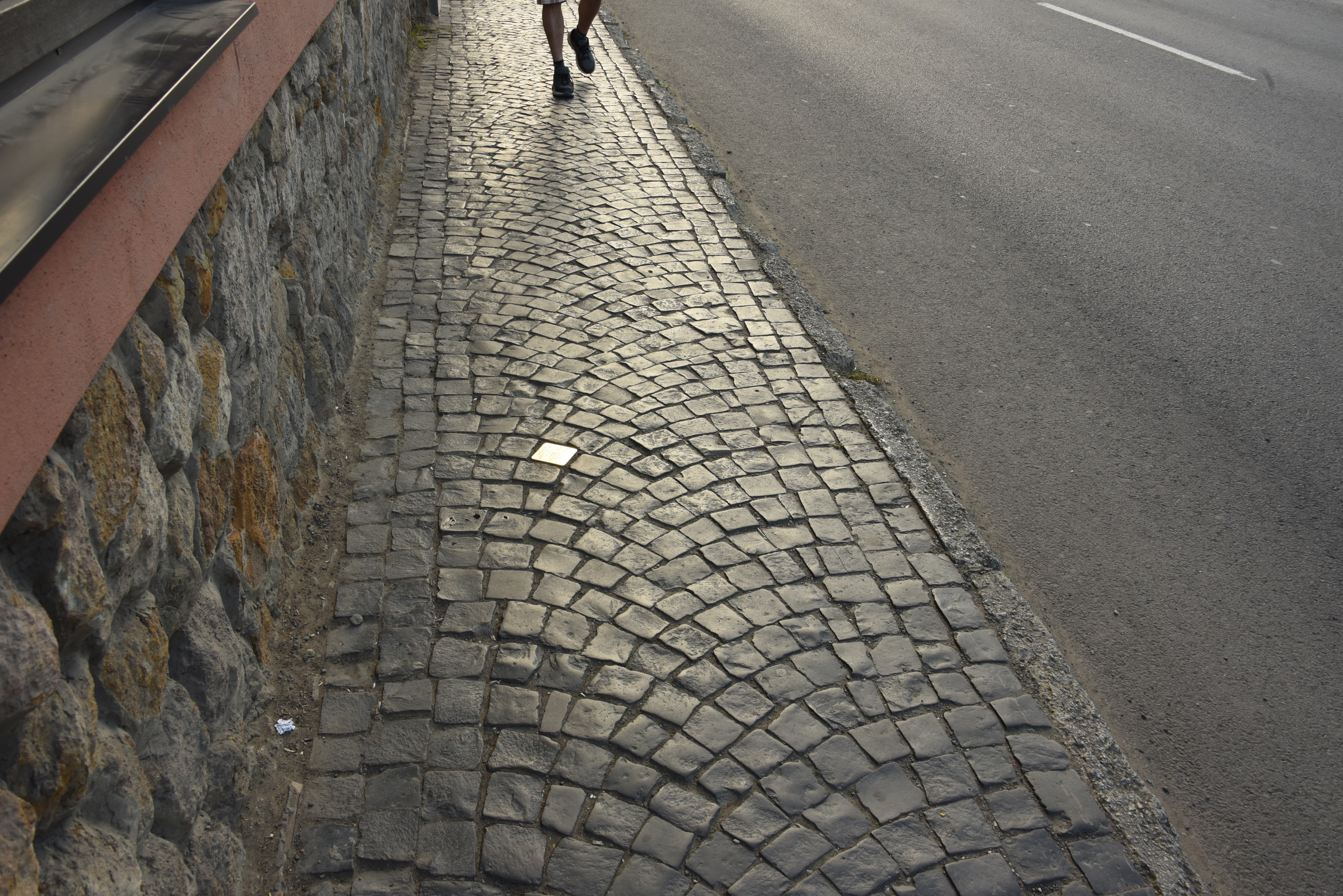
Stolperstein for Jeremias Krämer in Fiľakovo

Stolpersteine is the German name for stumbling blocks collocated all over Europe by German artist Gunter Demnig. They remember the fate of the victims of Nazi Germany being murdered, deported, exiled or driven to suicide. The first Stolperstein collocations in the Banskobystrický kraj, the Banská Bystrica Region of present-day Slovakia (formerly Czechoslovakia), took place in Banská Bystrica and in Brezno on 31 October 2012.

The inscriptions in Fiľakovo and Tornaľa are in both Hungarian and Slovak as there both languages are spoken. Generally, the stumbling blocks are posed in front of the building where the victims had their last self chosen residence. The name of the Stolpersteine in Slovak is pamätné kamene, memorial stones, in Hungarian botlatókő, stumbling stones.

The lists are sortable; the basic order follows the alphabet according to the last name of the victim.

== Banská Bystrica ==
Stone	Inscription	Location	Life and death
	HERE LIVED; JÁN BAKOSS; BORN 1895; ARRESTED 5.1.1945; IN MARTIN; MURDERED 31.1.1945	Lazovná 194/40	Ján Bakoss was born on 31 March 1895 in Pukanec. His parents were Michal Bakoš and Anna née Gombkötő, also Gomketi. In 1915 he graduated from high school in Banská Štiavnica and began to study Protestant theology. He was sent to the Russian front in the same year, where he was injured. In 1920, he concluded his theological studies in Bratislava, was ordained a priest and served in chapels in Pukanec and Martin, thereafter as parish priest in Jabloňovce. In 1924 he was appointed minister of Hybe and married Elena née Schwarz, one of three daughters of Pukanec lawyer Ján Schwarz. The couple had at least two sons. In 1935 the family moved to Poprad-Veľká, in 1935 to Banská Bystrica. Ján Bakoss was also an avid writer, a translator from German, an editor and a fighter against fascism. He founded the Church Fund in his parish and saved many Jewish fellow citizens from deportation by baptizing them and placing their children in church orphanages. He also took part in the preparation of the Slovak National Uprising (SNU) and became a member of the Revolutionary National Committee. After the suppression of the SNU, his brother-in-law Teodor Schwarz, a doctor in Martin, later professor at the Medical Faculty in Košice, hid him from the Gestapo. On 5 January 1945 he was arrested. He was murdered by the Nazi regime on 31 January 1945 in Martin. His remains were found in a mass grave and later-on buried in Banská Bystrica. His eldest son Ivan, a lecturer in medicine, died on 2 April 1945 during a raid, he was probably the last Nazi victim of Banská Bystrica. The youngest son, Pavel, became a professor at the Medical School of Bratislava's Comenius University. A street in Banská Bystrica is named after him.
	HERE LIVED; LADISLAV GOTTHILF; BORN 1901; ARRESTED 10.11.1944; IN HARMANEC; MURDERED 20.11.1944; IN KREMNICKA	Horná Ulica 80/23	Ladislav Gotthilf was born on 25 June 1901. His parents were Wilhelm Gotthilf and Irene née Moškovic. He had at least one sister. He became a gynecologist and married to Eveline Waltraut née Hafner, a woman from Germany. The couple had a son, Michael (born 1937). In the autumn of 1944, the family fled to Harmanec. The family lacked clothing and other things, and his wife had to leave their cranny to procure necessary things. She was recognized and denounced, the hiding place was found out, and Ladislav Gotthilf and his family were arrested on 10 November 1944. Ten days later, on 20 November 1944, father, mother and son were shot in the course of the Massacre of Kremnička.
	HERE LIVED; MICHAL GOTTHILF; BORN 1937; ARRESTED 10.11.1944; IN HARMANEC; MURDERED 20.11.1944; IN KREMNICKA	Horná Ulica 80/23	Michal Klaus Gotthilf, also Michael, was born either in 1934 or in 1937. His parents were Dr. Ladislav Gotthilf (see above) and Waltraut née Hepner (see below). His mother was Catholic, his father was Jewish. He was baptized in May 1937. Also his father became a Protestant. Nevertheless, Michal Gotthilf and his family were arrested on 10 November 1944. Ten days later, on 20 November 1944, father, mother and son were shot in the course of the Massacre of Kremnička.
	HERE LIVED; WALTRAUT; GOTTHILFOVÁ; NÉE HEPNER; BORN 1906; ARRESTED 10.11.1944; IN HARMANEC; MURDERED 20.11.1944; IN KREMNICKA	Horná Ulica 80/23	Waltraut Eveline Gotthilfová née Hepner, called Traute, was born in 1906 in Obernigk near Breslau, then Germany. She married Ladislav Gotthilf, a physician. The couple had a son, Michal (see above). She was a housewife. Although Waltraut Gotthilfová was of German descent and of catholic faith and although both husband and son were baptized, the whole family was arrested in Harmanec on 10 November 1944. Ten days later, on 20 November 1944, father, mother and son were shot in the course of the Massacre of Kremnička.
	HERE LIVED; ALEXANDER GRÄBER; BORN 1890; ARRESTED 17.11.1944; MURDERED 20.11.1944; IN KREMNICKA	Horná Ulica 99/43	Alexander Gräber was born on 16 April 1890. He was a businessman and married to Anna née Stern (see below). Husband and wife were seized by the Gestapo, imprisoned and executed during the Massacre of Kremnička on 20 November 1944.
	HERE LIVED; ANNA GRÄBEROVÁ; BORN 1897; ARRESTED 17.11.1944; MURDERED 20.11.1944; IN KREMNICKA	Horná Ulica 99/43	Anna Gräberová née Stern was born on 17 February 1897 in Lukov in the Prešov Region. Her parents were Moritz Stern and Rezi née Rottenberg. She was married to Alexander Gräber (see above). She was a housewife. She and her husband were seized by the Gestapo, imprisoned and executed during the Massacre of Kremnička on 20 November 1944. Another report on her death to Yad Vashem was submitted by her cousin Daniel Rottenberg from Philadelphia, PA. He could survive the Shoah.
	HERE LIVED; FERDINAND KARVAŠ; BORN 1892; ARRESTED 18.12.1944; MURDERED 9.1.1945; IN NEMECKÁ	Horná Ulica 107/55	Ferdinand Karvaš was born on 2 June 1892. He worked as a medical practitioner in Horná Ulica of Banská Bystrica and was also a head physician in a spa in nearby Brusno. He was married to Karola née Skutecká, a painter (see below). The couple had one son, Peter Karvaš (born on 25 April 1920). After the suppression of the Slovak National Uprising, he and his wife were seized by the Gestapo in Banská Bystrica on 18 December 1944, imprisoned, deported to Germany and executed there on 9 January 1945. Their son could survive. He became a well known playwright, prose and theater theorist as well as a diplomat. He died in 1999 in Bratislava.
	HERE LIVED; KAROLA KARVAŠOVÁ; NÉE SKUTECKÁ; BORN 1893; ARRESTED 18.12.1944; MURDERED 9.1.1945; IN NEMECKÁ	Horná Ulica 107/55	Karola Skutecká-Karvašová, before 1937 Karola Karvašová née Skutecká was born on 4 June 1893 in Banská Bystrica. Her parents were painter Dominik Skutecký (1849-1921) and Cecília née Lévyová, also Löwy. She had an older brother, Alexander Skutecký (born on 25 June 1883 in Vienna, see below). Early-on she was trained in several languages and became fluent in German, Hungarian, French, English and Italian. She studied at the Art Academies of Vienna and Budapest and achieved a diploma. Her brother had become an architect, she was married to Ferdinand Karvaš, a physician. The couple had one son, Peter Karvaš (born on 25 April 1920). As a paint she used the pseudonym Rolla. After the death of her father she worked in his studio. She used pastel techniques in creating portraits of family members and friends as well as oil paint to create still lifes. Her works today can be found mainly in private property in Banská Bystrica and Bratislava but also in the Stredoslovenská galéria, a museum in Banská Bystrica. After the suppression of the Slovak National Uprising, she and her husband were seized by the Gestapo in Banská Bystrica on 18 December 1944, imprisoned, deported to Germany and executed there on 9 January 1945. Her brother, who had designed several banks, insurance companies and residential buildings, was murdered at an unknown place near Banská Bystrica in late 1944. Her son could survive. He became a well known playwright, prose and theater theorist as well as a diplomat. He died in 1999 in Bratislava.
	HERE LIVED; DEZIDER KEME; BORN 1895; ARRESTED 11.11.1944; MURDERED 20.11.1944; IN KREMNICKA	Námestie SNP 21/21	Dezider Keme was born on 14 December 1895 in Klin in the Orava region. He was a merchant and married to Kornelia née Haas. The couple had at least one daughter, Lucia (see below). The family lived in Banská Bystrica. Father, mother and child were seized by the Gestapo on 11 November 1944, imprisoned and executed during the Massacre of Kremnička on 20 November 1944.
	HERE LIVED; KORNÉLIA KEMEOVÁ; BORN 1908; ARRESTED 11.11.1944; MURDERED 20.11.1944; IN KREMNICKA	Námestie SNP 21/21	Kornélia Kemeová née Haas was born in 1908. She was married to Dezider Keme, a merchant. The couple had at least one daughter, Lucia (see below). The family lived in Banská Bystrica. Father, mother and child were seized by the Gestapo on 11 November 1944, imprisoned and executed during the Massacre of Kremnička on 20 November 1944.
	HERE LIVED; LUCIA KEMEOVÁ; BORN 1931; ARRESTED 11.11.1944; MURDERED 20.11.1944; IN KREMNICKA	Námestie SNP 21/21	Lucia Kemeová was born in 1931. Her parents were Dezider Keme, a merchant, and Kornelia née Haas. The family lived in Banská Bystrica. Father, mother and child were seized by the Gestapo on 11 November 1944, imprisoned and executed during the Massacre of Kremnička on 20 November 1944.
	HERE LIVED; TEODOR ROSENBERG; BORN 1925; CAPTURED AS A PARTISAN; AT BREZNO; EXECUTED 12.12.1944; IN BREZNO	Dolná 137/4	Teodor Rosenberg was born in 1925 in Banská Bystrica. His parents were Marcel Rosenberg and Ilona née Tyroler. He had an older brother, Tomáš (see below). He was a student and single. Both brothers were arrested, interned and shot by the Nazi regime on 12 December 1944 in Brezno.
	HERE LIVED; TOMÁŠ ROSENBERG; BORN 1923; CAPTURED AS A PARTISAN; AT BREZNO; EXECUTED 12.12.1944; IN BREZNO	Dolná 137/4	Tomáš Rosenberg was born in 1923 or 1924 in Banská Bystrica. His parents were Marcel Rosenberg and Ilona née Tyroler. He had a younger brother, Teodor (see above). He was a student and single. Both brothers were arrested, interned and shot by the Nazi regime on 12 December 1944 in Brezno.
	HERE LIVED; VILIAM SALNER; BORN 1904; ARRESTED 6.12.1944; MURDERED 19.12.1944; IN KREMNICKA	Horná Ulica 51	Viliam Salner
	HERE LIVED; ERNEST ŠEBÖK; BORN 1895; ARRESTED 17.10.1944; MURDERED 20.11.1944; IN KREMNICKA	Dolná 160/27	Ernest Šebök was born on 27 January 1895 in Lopej. He was an athlete, sports official and sponsor of sports events. In the 1920s he was one of the founders of ice hockey in Slovakia with close affiliations with the sports clubs ŠK Slavia in Bratislava and ŠK Banská Bystrica. He became the first referee of Canadian hockey in Slovakia. As a pioneer of figure skating, tennis, swimming and organized tourism in Banská Bystrica he also built up a store for sporting goods in this city in the 1940s. He was an organizer of several championships of figure skating in Czechoslovakia. Racially persecuted, he became a victim of Nazi terror. After the suppression of the Slovak National Uprising, he was seized by the Gestapo in Banská Bystrica on 17 October 1944, imprisoned and executed during the Massacre of Kremnička on 20 November 1944.
	HERE LIVED; ALEXANDER; SKUTECKÝ; BORN 1883; PERSECUTED 1944; ON THE RUN; MURDERED 29.10.1944; IN HIADEĽESKÉ SEDLO	Horná Ulica 107/55	Alexander Skutecký

== Brezno ==
Stone	Inscription	Location	Life and death
	HERE LIVED; GEJZA HAJÓŠ; BORN 1893; DEPORTED 1942; TO NOVÁKY AND OTHER; CONCENTRATION CAMPS; MURDERED 7.4.1945; IN EBENSEE	On the right side of the building Československej armády 2298/59	Gejza Hajóš was born on 11 May 1893. His mother's first name was Berta. He traded with mixed goods and was married to Ida née Wajsman (born 1906). The couple had at least one son, Jehúda. Husband and wife were both deported to a camp Nováky. It is known that his wife was deported on 18 June 1942 to another camp in Žilina. It is not known how Gejza Hajóš arrived in Ebensee concentration camp. There he was murdered by the Nazi regime on 7 April 1945. The official cause of death was Bronchopneumonia bilateralism. The fate of his wife is unknown. His son could survive. In 1957 and in 1978 he submitted reports on the death of his father to Yad Vashem. At that time he lived in a Kibbutz in Israel.
	HERE LIVED; EMIL MITTELMANN; BORN 1898; DEPORTED 1942; TO NOVÁKY; TO LUBLIN; MURDERED 1943	Námestie generála Štefánika 30	Emil Mittelmann
	HERE LIVED; HUGO MITTELMANN; BORN 1896; ARRESTED 27.3.1942; DEPORTED 1942; TO TREBILNKA; MURDERED THERE	Námestie generála Štefánika 49	Hugo Mittelmann was born on 9 January 1896 in Vrutky. His parents were Hermann Mittelmann (born 1848) and Katerína née Eckstein (born 1870). He had six siblings. He was a shopkeeper and married to Šarolta née Fassel (see below). The couple had two daughters, Edita and Alica (born 1926). According to the Yad Vashem reports, the circumstances of deportation and death of Hugo Mittelmann, his wife and their daughter Alica are unknown. With high probability all three were murdered in an extermination camp set up by the Nazi regime in today's Poland. His daughter Edita could escape and survive the Shoah. After her marriage, her last name was Belanová. It was she who submitted the report on her father's death in 1996 to Yad Vashem. She then lived in Jerusalem.
	HERE LIVED; ALICA MITTELMANNOVÁ; BORN 1926; DEPORTED 1942; TO SOBIBOR; MURDERED THERE	Námestie generála Štefánika 49	Alica Mittelmannová was born on 22 November 1926 in Brezno. Her parents were Hugo Mittelmann and Šarlota née Fassel. She had a sister, Edita. She was a schoolgirl. According to the Yad Vashem reports, the circumstances of deportation and death of Alica Mittelmannová and her parents are unknown. With high probability all three were murdered in an extermination camp set up by the Nazi regime in today's Poland. Her sister could survive and submitted the report on Alica's death to Yad Vashem.
	HERE LIVED; ŠALOTA MITTELMANNOVÁ; BORN 1901; DEPORTED 1942; TO SOBIBOR; MURDERED THERE	Námestie generála Štefánika 49	Šarlota Mittelmannová née Fassel was born on 2 January 1901 in Banská Bystrica. Her parents were Ben Fassel, also Benó (1868-1916) and Erna née Seidler (between 1880 and 1888-6 June 1942). She was a merchant and married to Hugo Mittelmann (see above). The couple had two daughters, Edita and Alica (born 1926). According to the Yad Vashem reports, the circumstances of deportation and death of Šarlota Mittelmannová, her husband and their daughter Alica are unknown. With high probability all three were murdered in an extermination camp set up by the Nazi regime in today's Poland. Her mother was murdered by the Nazi regime as well. Her daughter Edita could escape and survive the Shoah. After her marriage, her last name was Belanová. It was she who submitted the report on her father's death in 1996 to Yad Vashem. She then lived in Jerusalem.

== Fiľakovo ==
Stone	Inscription	Location	Life and death
	HERE LIVED; KRÄMER JEREMIÁS; BORN 1876; DEPORTED 1944; TO CONCENTRATION CAMP; MURDERED	Hlavná 649/23	Jeremiás Krämer was born in 1876 in Edelény in Northern Hungary. His father was Elijahu Krämer. He was married to Emma née Buchler.The couple had at least two sons, Bela (born 1906 in Fiľakovo) and Ernest. He was a photographer. Several of his postcards, showing Slovak landscapes, are still available in art trade. He and his son Bela were deported to concentration camps and murdered by the Nazi regime. According to his son Ernest, he lost his life in 1944 in Auschwitz. His son Ernest could survive the Shoah. In 2007, he sent the reports on the death of his father and his brother to Yad Vashem. At that time, he lived in Montreal, Canada.

== Halič ==
Stone	Inscription	Location	Life and death
	HERE LIVED; ERNEST STERNLICHT; BORN 1890; DEPORTED 1.5.1944; MURDERED; IN MAUTHAUSEN	Mieru 43/41	Ernest Sternlicht was born in May 1890 in Halič. His parents were Samuel Sternlicht and Reizl. He had at least two brothers, Jekutiel (born 1886) and Asher (born 1892). He was married to Margit née Marer (see below). The couple had at least three children, see below, Samuel (born 1923), Veruška (born 1925) and Richard Ervin (born 1928). According to the Yad Vashem reports, the couple and their children Veruška and Richard Ervin were all deported to Auschwitz concentration camp on 9 June 1944. Ernest and Richard Sternlicht were murdered in Mauthausen in March 1945, Veruška Sternlichtová lost her life in Theresienstadt concentration camp in September 1945 due to the hardship and suffering at the concentration camps and during the death march. Both his brothers, his sister-in-law Malka, his nephew Menachem (born 1920), his nieces Miriam (born 1922) and Dvora (born 1925) were murdered in the course of the Shoah. His wife and his son Samuel could survive. The report on his death was submitted to Yad Vashem in 2007 by his daughter-in-law, Gertruda Sternlichtová. In the 1950s two granddaughters of Ernest Steinlicht were born.
	HERE LIVED; ERVIN STERNLICHT; BORN 1928; DEPORTED 1.5.1944; MURDERED; IN MAUTHAUSEN	Mieru 43/41	Richard Ervin Sternlicht as born on 8 January 1928 in Halič. His parents were Ernest Sternlicht and Margita née Marer. He had two siblings, Veruška and Samuel (both see below). According to the Yad Vashem reports, Richard Ervin Sternlicht, his parents and his sister were all deported to Auschwitz concentration camp on 9 June 1944. There the family was separated. Ernest and Richard Sternlicht were sent on a death march to Mauthausen. Both were murdered there in March 1945. Mother and sister were sent to Ravensbrück, Bergen-Belsen und Thersienstadt, where they were liberated by the Soviet army on 8 May 1945. But Veruška Sternlichtová lost her life in September 1945 due to the hardship and suffering during her time in concentration camps. His brother Samuel could survive the Shoah. He married and had two daughters.
	HERE LIVED; SAMUEL STERNLICHT; BORN 1923; DEPORTED 1944; WORK CAMP; IN HUNGARY; LIBERATION; SURVIVED	Mieru 43/41	Samuel Sternlicht was born in 1923 in Halič. His parents were Ernest Sternlicht and Margita née Marer. He had two siblings, Viera (see below) and Ervin (see above). He was deported to a work camp in Hungary. He and his mother could survive. His father and his siblings were all murdered by the Nazi regime. Samuel Sternlicht became a butcher and married Gertruda née Pollak, who also had lost brother and sister during the Shoah. The couple had two daughters, Judith (born 1950) and another girl (born 1951). According to his daughter Judith, her father "was not very religious, but a good Jew." In 1969, both girls left Czechoslovakia and emigrated to Israel. Later-on Judith married a man named Landshut. The couple went to Germany and had three children. Gertruda Sternlichtová became head of the Jewish community in Lučenec and fought for to rebuild the synagogue of this city . In 2007, she reported the murder of her siblings, the siblings of her husband and her father-in-law to Yad Vashem. Judith Landshut became a volunteer in the Jewisch community of Hamburg.
	HERE LIVED; MARGITA; STERNLICHTOVÁ; BORN 1900; DEPORTED 1944; TO AUSCHWITZ; TO RAVENSBRÜCK; TO BERGEN-BELSEN; TO THERESIENSTADT; LIBERATION; SURVIVED	Mieru 43/41	Margita Sternlichtová née Marer was born on 30 July 1906 in Tótgyarmat. She was married to Ernest Sternlicht (see above). The couple had at least three children, Samuel (born 1923), Veruška (born 1925) and Richard Ervin (born 1928). According to the Yad Vashem reports, the couple and their children Veruška and Richard Ervin were all deported to Auschwitz concentration camp on 9 June 1944. There the family was separated. Father and son were sent on a death march to Mauthausen. Both were murdered there in March 1945. Mother and daughter were sent first to Ravensbrück, then to Bergen-Belsen, finally to Theresienstadt concentration camp. There both were liberated on 8 May 1945, but Veruška Sternlichtová lost her life in September 1945 due to the hardship and suffering in the concentration camps and during the death march. Her son Samuel could survive. He became a butcher, married Gertruda née Pollak and they had two daughters.
	HERE LIVED; VERUŠKA; STERNLICHTOVÁ; BORN 1925; DEPORTED 1944; TO AUSCHWITZ; TO RAVENSBRÜCK; TO BERGEN-BELSEN; TO THERESIENSTADT; LIBERATION; DIED IN THE AFTERMATH; 30.9.1945	Mieru 43/41	Veruška Sternlichtová, also Viera, was born on 19 June 1925 in . Her parents were Ernest Sternlicht and Margita née Marer. He had two brothers, Samuel and Richard Ervin (see above). According to the Yad Vashem reports, 19-years-old Veruška Sternlichtová, her parents and her brother Richard Ervin were all deported to Auschwitz concentration camp on 9 June 1944. There the family was separated. Father and son were sent on a death march to Mauthausen. Both were murdered there in March 1945. Mother and daughter were sent first to Ravensbrück, then to Bergen-Belsen, finally to Theresienstadt concentration camp. There both were liberated on 8 May 1945, but Veruška Sternlichtová lost her life in September 1945 due to the hardship and suffering in the concentration camps and during the death march. Her mother and her older brother could survive the Shoah. Samuel Sternlicht married and had two daughters.

== Lučenec ==
Stone	Inscription	Location	Life and death
	HERE LIVED; JAKUB KLEIN; BORN 1878; DEPORTED IN 1944; TO AUSCHWITZ; MURDERED THERE	Martina Rázusa 1247/95	Jakub Klein was born in 1878. He was married to Mária née Kornfeld. The couple had at least one daughter, Julia. In 1944, Jakub Klein and his wife were deported to Auschwitz concentration camp. They were both murdered there. Their daughter married Eugen Jakubovits, the couple had three children.
	HERE LIVED; MÁRIA KLEINOVÁ; NÉE KORNFELD; BORN 1880; DEPORTED IN 1944; TO AUSCHWITZ; MURDERED THERE	Martina Rázusa 1247/95	Mária Kleinová née Kornfeld was born in 1880. She was married to Jakub Klein. The couple had at least one daughter, Julia. In 1944, Mária Kleinová and her husband were deported to Auschwitz concentration camp. They were both murdered there. Their daughter married Eugen Jakubovits, the couple had three children.

== Ratková ==
Stone	Inscription	Location	Life and death
	HERE LIVED; L'UDOVÍT GRÜNFELD; BORN 1890; DEPORTED 15.5.1942; MURDERED 24.6.1944; IN TREBLINKA	House without number (next to Ratková 41)	Ľudovít Grünfeld, also Lajos, was born in 1890 in Ratková. His parents were Jacob Grünfeld and Ethel née Flor. He had at least two sisters. He was married to Anna née Grünfeld (born 1908 to Bela Voijtech Adalbert Grünfeld and Rosa née Weiß). The couple had at least two sons, Ernő (born 1932) and Misha (born 1934). He traded with textiles and was known as a benefactor who helped several citizens in the time of crisis. Shortly before the aryanization of his store, he burned the book of debtors in order to assure that his successors could not reclaim anything from the locals in his name. Eighty citizens from Ratková were deported in the course of the Shoah. Only two could survive. Ludovít Grünfeld, his wife and their sons were murdered by the Nazi regime in Treblinka extermination camp or other camps established in Poland. His sisters Szeren Lemberger and Ilona Salvendy were both murdered in Auschwitz, also several relatives of his wife.

== Tornaľa ==
Stone	Inscription	Location	Life and death
	HERE LIVED; DR. ROTHMAN; SÁNDOR; BORN 1890; FORCED LABOUR; MURDERED; 16.10.1944; PUSZTAVÁM	at the corner Hurbanova/Štúrova	Sándor Rothman, also Alexander, was born most probably in 1897 in Rudno, Slovakia. His parents were Eduard Rothman and Emma née Weiss. He became a physician and was married to Aranka née Rosenberg (born 1904 or 1905 in Tornaľa to Jonas Rosenberg and Ester née Friedman). The couple lived in Tornaľa since 1918, they had at least two children, Marta (born 1926) and Stephan or István (born 1928). Sándor Rothman and his son had to do forced labour in Hungary. In 1944, both father and son were shot in the Military Labor Camp in Pusztavám. His wife was murdered in Auschwitz concentration camp in September 1944. His brothers-in-law Herman and Vilmosh Rosenberg, their children Ester and Janos, his sister-in-law Erzsebet Lissauer and other family members also lost their lives in 1944 in Auschwitz. His daughter could survive the Shoah. She married Ladislav Bednar (1917-1982), the couple had one child.

These lists make no claims to be complete.

== Dates of collocations ==
According to the website of Gunter Demnig the Stolpersteine in the Banskobystrický kraj were posed by the artist himself on the following days:

- 31 October 2012: Banská Bystrica, Brezno (Námestie generála Štefánika 49)
- 22 July 2013: Banská Bystrica, Halič
- 18 September 2014: Banská Bystrica, Lučenec, Ratková
- 7 August 2015: Brezno (Československej armády 2298/59), Tornaľa
- 8 August 2015: Banská Bystrica (Horná Ulica 23)
- 8 August 2016: Banská Bystrica (Dolnej Ulica 6), Fiľakovo
- 23 September 2017: Banská Bystrica (Horná Ulica 51 and 55), Brezno (Námestie generála Štefánika 49)

== See also ==
- List of places with Stolpersteine
