= Oľga Textorisová =

Slovak writer (1880–1938)

- Born: 23 November 1880; Revúca, Slovakia
- Died: 4 June 1938 (aged 57); Blatnica, Slovakia
- Other names: Fata Morgana, Janko Jedľa, Jsmín, K. Olšanská, S. F. Šidlo, Žofia Ravenská
- Known for: writer and teacher
- Relatives: Izabela Textorisová (sister)

Oľga Textorisová (23 November 1880 – 4 June 1938) was a Slovak writer and teacher.

== Biography ==
Oľga Textorisová was born on 23 November 1880 in Revúca, Slovakia. Her father was Andrej Textoris and her mother Antonia Kuorková. Her sister was the botanist Izabela Textorisová. Textorisová studied at the Teachers Institute in Banská Bystrica. She fostered five girls, including the poet Masumi Halamová.

Textorisová primarily wrote novels, and poems for children. Her first novel, "On Track", was published in the magazine Dennica in 1899. This magazine went on to publish a number of her novels. She started her career as a teacher in 1904, in Blatnica. She worked from 1907 to 1919 in a Slovakia-Croatian school in Stara Pazova. She returned to Blatnica, where she worked until her death in 1938. A selection of her journalistic work was published posthumously as Lessons Oľgy Textorisovej.

Her work centred on topics around local Slovak knowledge, the region's history, religious history, as well as ethics and social responsibility. Textorisová also worked with youth associations and organisations for the care of sick and those affected by war.
