= Jozef Cíger-Hronský =

Slovak writer (1896–1960)

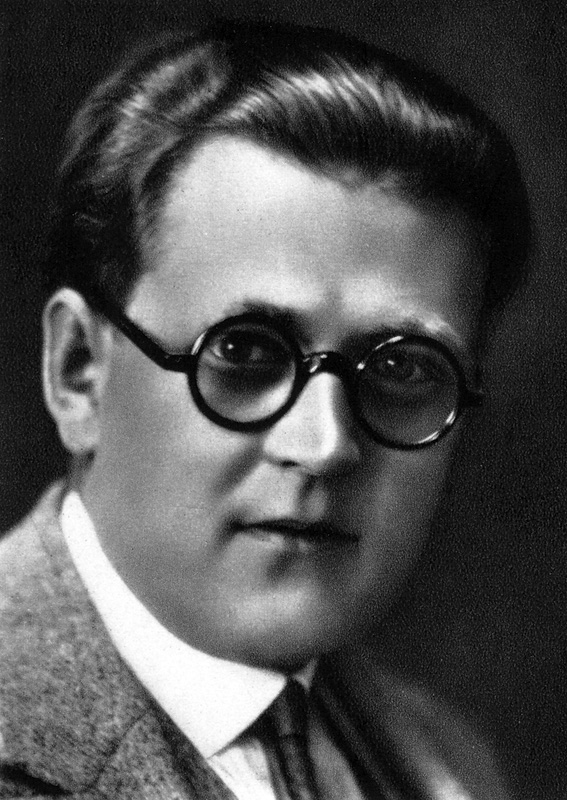
- Jozef Cíger-Hronský
- Born: Jozef Cíger; 23 February 1896; Zvolen, Austria-Hungary
- Died: 13 July 1960 (aged 64); Luján, Argentina
- Resting place: National Cemetery in Martin
- Occupation: Writer

Jozef Cíger-Hronský (born Jozef Cíger; 23 February 1896 – 13 July 1960) was a Slovak writer, teacher, publicist, later secretary and chair of the Matica slovenská.

== Life ==
=== Early life ===
Jofez Cíger was born in 1896 into a central Slovak family of carpenters in Zvolen. He had six siblings. He attended schools in Zvolen (1902–1907) and Krupina (1907–1910). As a young man, he wanted to pursue career in painting but due to insistence of his parents to train in a more secure profession, he finished his education at a Hungarian teacher school in Levice (1910–14).

=== Literary career ===
After graduation, Cíger worked as a teacher at various places, with the interruption of 1917–18, when he was sent to the Italian Front in the World War I. After he returned from the front, he started publishing short novellas and later novels under the name Jozef Cíger-Hronský. His Jozef Mak, Pisár Gráč and Andreas Búr Majster are considered by critics to be a part of the canon of Slovak realist prose. A distinct trait of Hronský's prosaic writing was that his main characters are typically completely average, ordinary people with no specific skills or aspirations. In addition to novels, Cíger-Hronský also wrote widely popular stories for children, including Smelý zajko (1930), Smelý zajko v Afrike (1931), Budkáčik a Dubkáčik (1932). He was also active as an editor of the magazine Slniečko (from 1928 until 1945), which focused on publishing high quality literature for children.

=== Involvement with fascism and emigration ===
In 1933 Cíger-Hronský became a secretary of the Matica slovenská and later in 1940 a chair, a position he held until 1945. In this function, he acted as an ardent supporter of the fascist Slovak People's Party, the regime under its rule and its alignment with Nazi Germany. He was a staunch critic of the Slovak National Uprising, particularly after being briefly held captive by the resistance fighters.

After the war, Cíger-Hronský fled out together with other representatives of the fascist regime Austria, later Italy and finally settled in Argentina, where he worked as a designer in a textile factory. There, he established the Matica slovenská Abroad (Zahraničná Matica slovenská) and was a chairman of the Slovak National Council abroad and an honorary chairman of the Association of Slovak Writers and Artists Abroad.

== Death ==
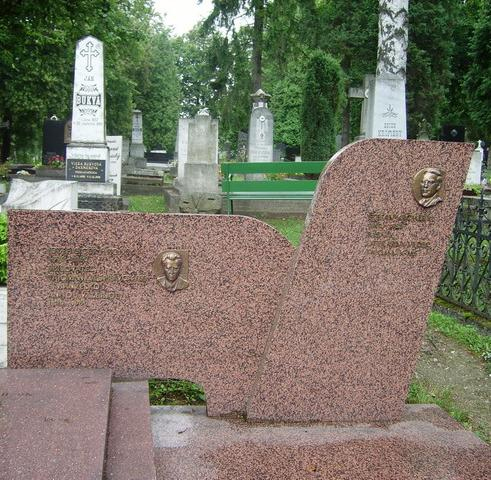
Grave of Jozef Cíger-Hronský (right), next to the grave of Štefan Krčméry at the National Cemetery in Martin

Hronský died on 13 July 1960 in Luján at the age of 64. After the Velvet Revolution, his remains were repatriated to Slovakia and later reburied at the National Cemetery in Martin in 1993.

== Controversy ==
=== Entanglement with fascism and antisemitism ===
While Cíger-Hronský did not hold any official post in the government, he was an important figure of the propaganda effort of the First Slovak Republic. In his novel, The World on Quagmire, Cíger-Hronský glorifyied the fascist ideology. In 1944 he joined the interior minister and chief architect of anti-Jewish legislation in Slovakia, Alexander Mach, for a promotion tour around Slovakia. As the chair of Matica slovenská, Cíger-Hronský required all job applicants to prove their "Aryan origin". Furthermore, the employees commonly wore Hlinka Guard uniform and a historical photograph documents Nazi salute was used by collaborators to greet Cíger-Hronský.

In January 1941 Hronský filled a complaint to the government that the local printing press used by Matica still belonged to its Jewish owner, resulting in him "earning money never before". Cíger-Hronský demanded the ownership of the printing press to be promptly transferred to Matica. This demand was swiftly granted.

== Legacy ==
Memorial plaques dedicated to Hronský have been installed in various Slovak cities, including Martin, Zvolen, Krupina and Šaľa. School named after Hronský include elementary schools in Krupina and Šaľa and grammar school in Vrútky. In 1996, the National Bank of Slovakia issued a memorial coin, commemorating 100th anniversary of Hronský's birth.

== Works ==
Hronský was writing as a realistic author, but under expressionist influence.

=== Prose ===
- 1923 - U nás (short story, "At us/At our home")
- 1925 - Domov (collection of short stories, "Home")
- 1927 - Žltý dom v Klokočove (novel, "A Yellow House in Klokočov")
- 1929 - Medové srdce (collection of short stories, "A Honey Heart")
- 1930 - Proroctvo doktora Stankovského (novel, "A Prophecy of Doctor Stankovský")
- 1932 - Chlieb (novel, "Bread")
- 1932 - Podpolianske rozprávky (collection of short prose, "Fairy tales from under the Poľana Mountains", also translated into German)
- 1933 - Jozef Mak (novel, also translated into English)
- 1933 - Tomčíkovci (collection of short prose)
- 1934 - Sedem sŕdc (collection of novellas, "Seven hearts")
- 1938 - Jarný vietor a iné rozprávky ("The spring wind and other fairy tales")
- 1939 - Na krížných cestách (novel)
- 1940 - Cesta slovenskou Amerikou (travel writing, "A journey through the Slovak America")
- 1940 - Pisár Gráč (novel, "Gráč the Scrivener")
- 1944 - Na Bukvovom dvore (novel, "At the Bukva's courtyard", also translated into Polish)
- 1944 - Šmáková mucha (collection of novellas)
- 1947 - Tri listy
- 1947 - Predávač talizmanov Liberius Gaius od Porta Colina (a religious novella, "A Talisman merchant Liberius Gaius by/from Port Colin")
- 1948 - Andreas Búr Majster (novel, "Andreas Búr the Master")
- 1960 - Svet na trasovisku (novel about the Slovak National Uprising, "The World on Quagmire")
- 1997 - Pohár z brúseného skla (collection of short prose, "A cup from cut glass")

=== Drama (comedies) ===
- 1926 - Firma Moor ("Moor Company")
- 1929 - Červený trojuholník ("A red triangle")
- 1929 - Návrat ("Comeback")

=== Children's literature ===
- 1924 - Najmladší Závodský ("The youngest Závodský")
- 1925 - Kremnické povesti ("Tales of Kremnica")
- 1926 - Janko Hrášok
- 1928 - Pod kozúbkom ("Under a little fireplace")
- 1930 - Smelý Zajko ("Courageous Hare")
- 1931 - Smelý Zajko v Afrike ("Courageous Hare in Africa")
- 1931 - Zakopaný meč (folk tales, "A buried sword")
- 1932 - Budkáčik a Dubkáčik
- 1932 - Sokoliar Tomáš ("Thomas the falconer")
- 1932 - Brondove rozprávky ("Brond's fairy tales")
- 1932 - Zábavky strýca Kurkovského
- 1933 - Zlatý dážď ("Golden rain")
- 1934 - Zlaté hodinky ("Golden watch")
- 1935 - Strýcovo vrtielko
- 1936 - Tri rozprávky ("Three fairy tales")
- 1937 - Zlatovlasá sestra ("A golden-haired sister")
- 1939 - Budatínski Frgáčovci (folk tales)
- 1940 - Tri múdre kozliatka ("Three clever little goats")
- 1941 - Traja bratia ("Three brothers")
