= Elena Maróthy-Šoltésová =

Slovak writer and editor (1855–1939)

Elena Šoltésová
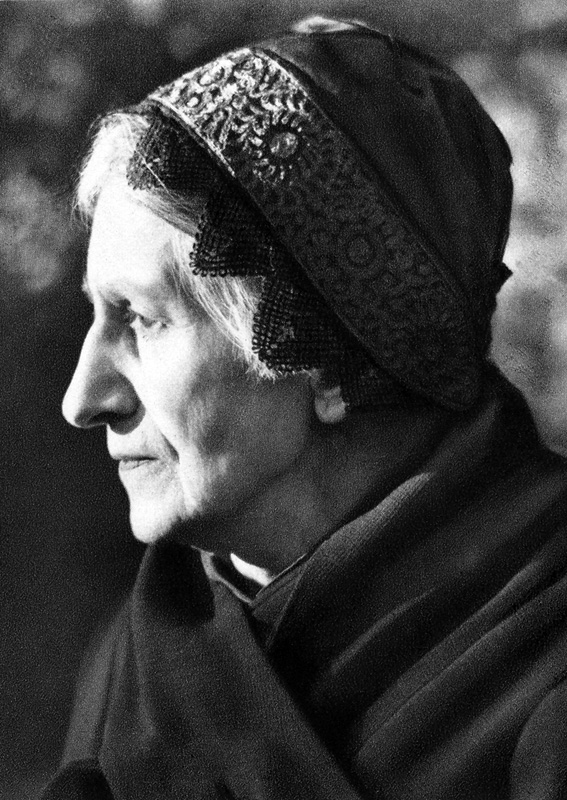
- Elena Maróthy-Šoltésová in 1937
- Born: Elena Maróthy; 6 January 1855 Krupina, Austria-Hungary
- Died: 11 February 1939 (aged 84) Martin, Czechoslovakia
- Resting place: National Cemetery in Martin
- Occupation: Writer, editor
- Language: Slovak
- Genre: Novel
- Literary movement: Literary realism
- Years active: 1881–1925
- Spouse: Ľudovít Michal Šoltés
- Children: 2
- Relatives: Ľudovít Maróthy (brother)

Elena Maróthy-Šoltésová (6 January 1855 – 11 February 1939) was a Slovak writer and editor. She was also a leading figure in the women's movement in Slovakia.

== Biography ==
The daughter and the eldest child of the Lutheran Reverend Daniel Maróthy and Karolina Hudecová, Maróthy-Šoltésová was born in Krupina on 6 January 1855. She grew up in the Ľuboreč village, where he father served as a pastor. Her father worked closely with national revival figures around Ľudovít Štúr and wrote nationalist poetry under the pseudonym Vrahobor Maškovský. Her mother died while she was still young.

After seven years of education in Hungarian and German in Lučenec, Maróthy-Šoltésová was compelled to end her schooling to assist her stepmother in caring for her younger siblings. Although her parents introduced her to nationalist circles, they disapproved of her pursuit of intellectual interests, which they considered unsuitable for a woman. At the age of 20, she married Ľudovít Michal Šoltés, a merchant she had met a year earlier at a Matica slovenská assembly. The marriage, to a man significantly older than herself, appears to have been motivated by her desire to gain independence from her parental household but Maróthy-Šoltésová held her husband in great affection. The likely reasons was that in contrast to her parents, her husband was highly supportive of her intellectual ambitions. The couple settled in Martin, his hometown and a prominent hub of Slovak nationalist intellectual life. They had two children, both of whom predeceased their parents – a daughter who died of tuberculosis at the age of eight, and a son who died at 33.

In Martin, Maróthy-Šoltésová quickly emerged as a prominent Slovak-language author of realist fiction and was also active as a literary critic. The profound grief caused by the untimely deaths of her children became a recurring theme in her writing, though she consistently refrained from overt sentimentality. Another central concern in her work was the portrayal of social issues. Literary critics have noted that the strong social orientation of her writings bears resemblance to the themes developed by the Norwegian author Bjørnstjerne Bjørnson.

In 1880, Maróthy-Šoltésová became a member of the committee for the Živena women's society in 1880 and served as its chair from 1894 to 1927. From 1912 to 1922, she was editor of the Živena magazine, which she helped found. Maróthy-Šoltésová also helped establish higher education for women in her country, including the Milan Rastislav Štefánik Institute. In her activities facilitating advancement of the Slovak national cause and emancipation of women, she collaborated closely with the president of newly independent First Czechoslovak Republic Tomáš Masaryk and his daughter Alice.

== Death ==
She died in Martin at the age of 84. She's buried at the National Cemetery in Martin.

== Works ==
- Na dedine (In the Village), novella (1881)
- Umierajúce dieťa (The Dying Child), short story (1885)
- V černickej šole (In the Černica School), prose (1891)
- Proti prúdu (Against the Current), novel (1894)
- Prvé previnenie (The First Offense), prose (1896)
- Popelka (Cinderella), prose (1898)
- Za letného večera (On a Summer Evening), prose (1902)
- Moje deti (My Children), diary (1923–24)
- Sedemdesiat rokov života (Seventy Years of Life), memoirs (1925)
- Sobrané spisy Eleny Maróthy Šoltésovej (Collected Works of Elena Maróthy Šoltésová) 1 – 6 (1921 – 25)
- Pohľady na literatúru (Perspectives on Literature), essays released posthumously (1958)
