= Mäsiarsky bok =

Coordinates: 48.4011°N 19.0911°E

- Interactive map of Mäsiarsky bok
- Area: 1.2781 km^{2} (0.4935 sq mi)
- Established: 1980
- Governing body: ŠOP - S-CHKO Štiavnické vrchy

Mäsiarsky bok is a nature reserve in the Slovak municipality of Krupina. It covers an area of 127.81 ha and has a protection level of 5 on national level. The national nature reserve is located at between 350 and 545 m above sea level on the eastern side of the road connecting Krupina and Babiná.

The protected area is declared for the protection of a forest complex with fragments of original or little changed forest stands on rocky slopes, for scientific research and educational purposes. The geological foundation of the whole area consists of pyroxene andesite and pyroclastic rock with a layer of clay-loam on top. The rocks formed rock cliffs and stone seas. The small Krupinica stream flows through the reserve. The predominant tree species are oak and beech. Other present species are cherry, hornbeam, maple, ash and linden. More than 60% of the trees is more than 100 years old and about 15% even more than 150 years. These stands are one of the most valuable nature reserve stands in the region with some very old protected oak trees.

== Fauna ==
The fauna consists of red deer, roe deer, wild boar, red fox and common buzzard. Regularly eagle owls nest in the nature reserve. Smaller birds are represented by more than 30 species. Other animal species present are: Eriogaster catax, Lucanus cervus, Eurasian otter, large copper and hazel dormouse.

== Tourism ==
The nature reserve is located directly at the road 66 between Krupina and Babiná and therefore easily reachable by car or bike. A hiking path marked with green signs leads along the Krupinica stream also from Krupina to Babiná train station without climbing the hills. The trail follows the bank of the stream and crosses it between Mäsiarsky bok and the Babiná train station. In spring this crossing can become impossible when the water level in the stream is too high, making Mäsiarsky bok only accessible from the Krupina side. For visiting the stone seas a climb higher up the hills is required. The station of Babiná is located close to the northern edge of the nature reserve. Furthermore, a restaurant and hotel can be found along the road on the other side of the stream.
