= Andrej Halaša =

Slovak academic translator (1852–1913)

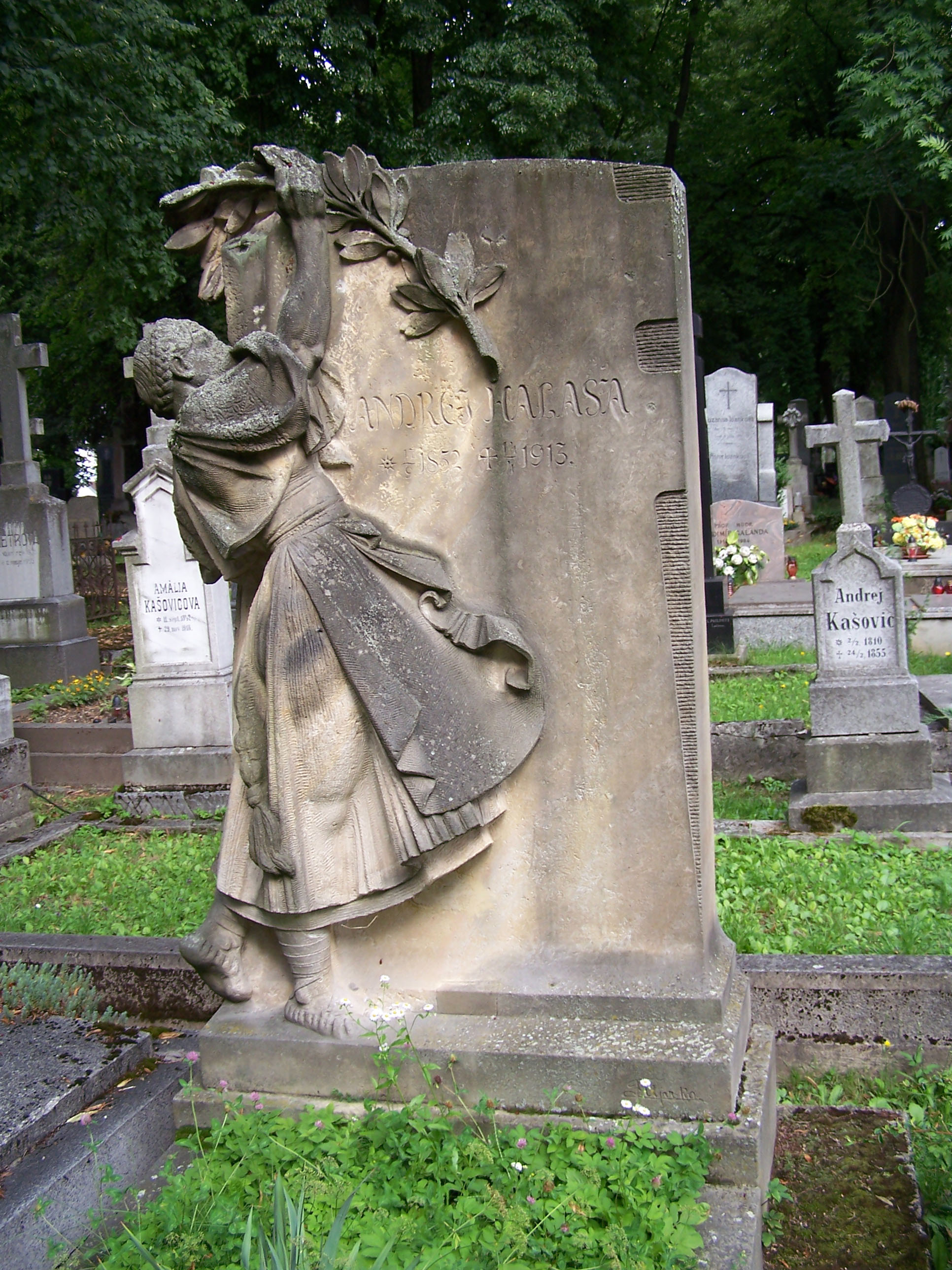
Grave at the National Cemetery in Martin

Andrej Halaša (1852–1913) was a melodramatic promoter, translator, editor, and ethnographer born in Austria-Hungary.

== Biography ==
Andrej Halaša (1852-1913) was born in Dolný Kubín and died in Martin (today's Slovakia).

Halaša worked as a clerk lawyer in Dolný Kubín, Slovakia. In 1874, he became an independent lawyer in Martin.

== Acts of Andrej Halaša ==
Halaša organized cultural endeavors, aiding in the creation and development of the National House in Martin, its first museum. He also organized cultural festivals such as the "August festival".

He was treasurer of the Slovak National Party and Matica Slovenská (MS) and was an active member of the Bohemian choir. He translated plays from various languages and edited two theatrical editions. He published two magazines and collected over ten thousand texts of Slovak folk songs. From his early youth, he was involved in the Slovak National group and was a leading character in the cultural areas of theatre, publicity, literature, and research.

Halaša also was an ideologist and publicist of the Slovak National Party, a co-operator of Živena and a book printing society editor and publisher in the Slovak press. In 1888, he helped create the National House. Five years later, he created the Theatre Society and the well known theatre in Martin.
