= Miloslav Schmidt =

Miloslav Schmidt (2 February 1881, Mošovce – 8 May 1934, Martin) was born in the family of an innkeeper and baker. After finishing school in Kremnica and completing training at his father's bakery Schmidt became the leading figure of the family business. He also used his skills in the area of culture and national revival. After coming to Martin he became interested in organizing volunteer fire brigades in Slovakia. Until his death he was the Commander of Martin Fire Brigades, the Commander of the Land Fire-brigade Union, which covered almost all fire brigades in Slovakia. His work resulted in the strengthening of fire protection in Slovakia.

He was also the member of the Czechoslovak Association of Esperanto and in 1921 took a role of Baron Révay in the first Slovak movie, Jánošík. In 1931 Schmidt received an order of the French Minister of Economy for his contribution in the economic area.

Schmidt is buried in the National Cemetery in Martin, Slovakia (the author of his tomb is Fraňo Štefunko)

== Gallery ==
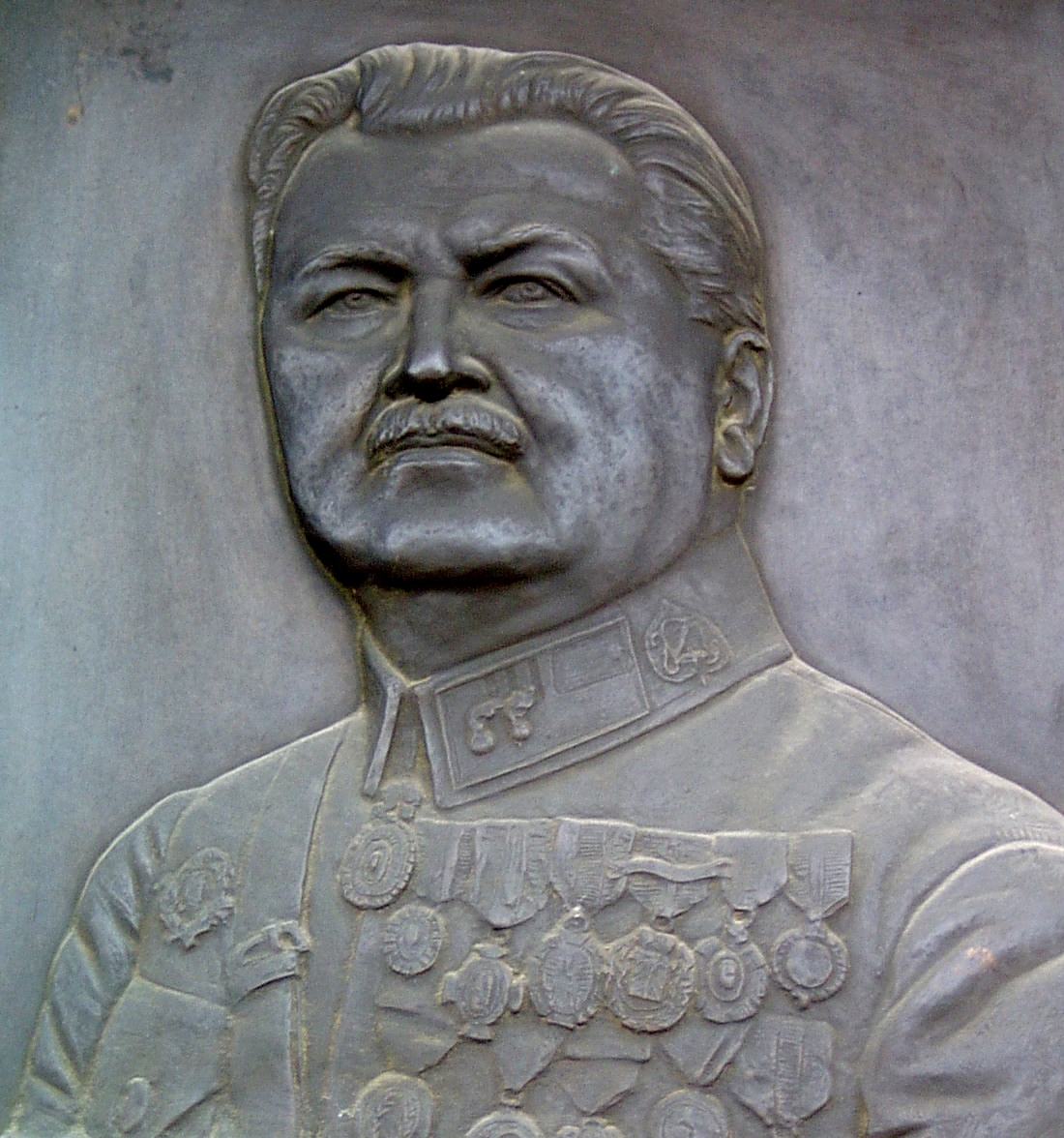
Miloslav Schmidt

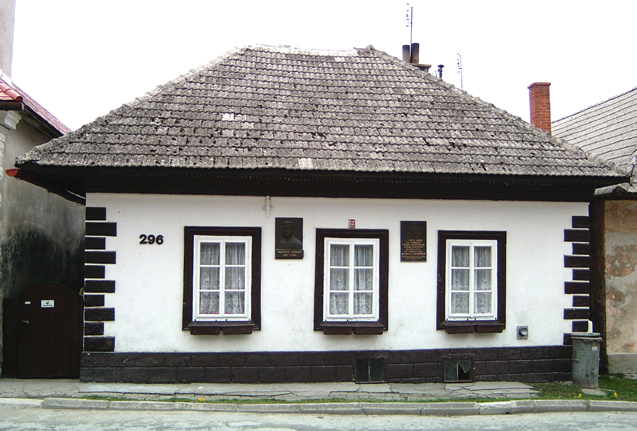
The birth house of Miloslav Schmidt in Mošovce
