= Bzenica, Slovakia =

Bzenica Szénásfalu
- Municipality
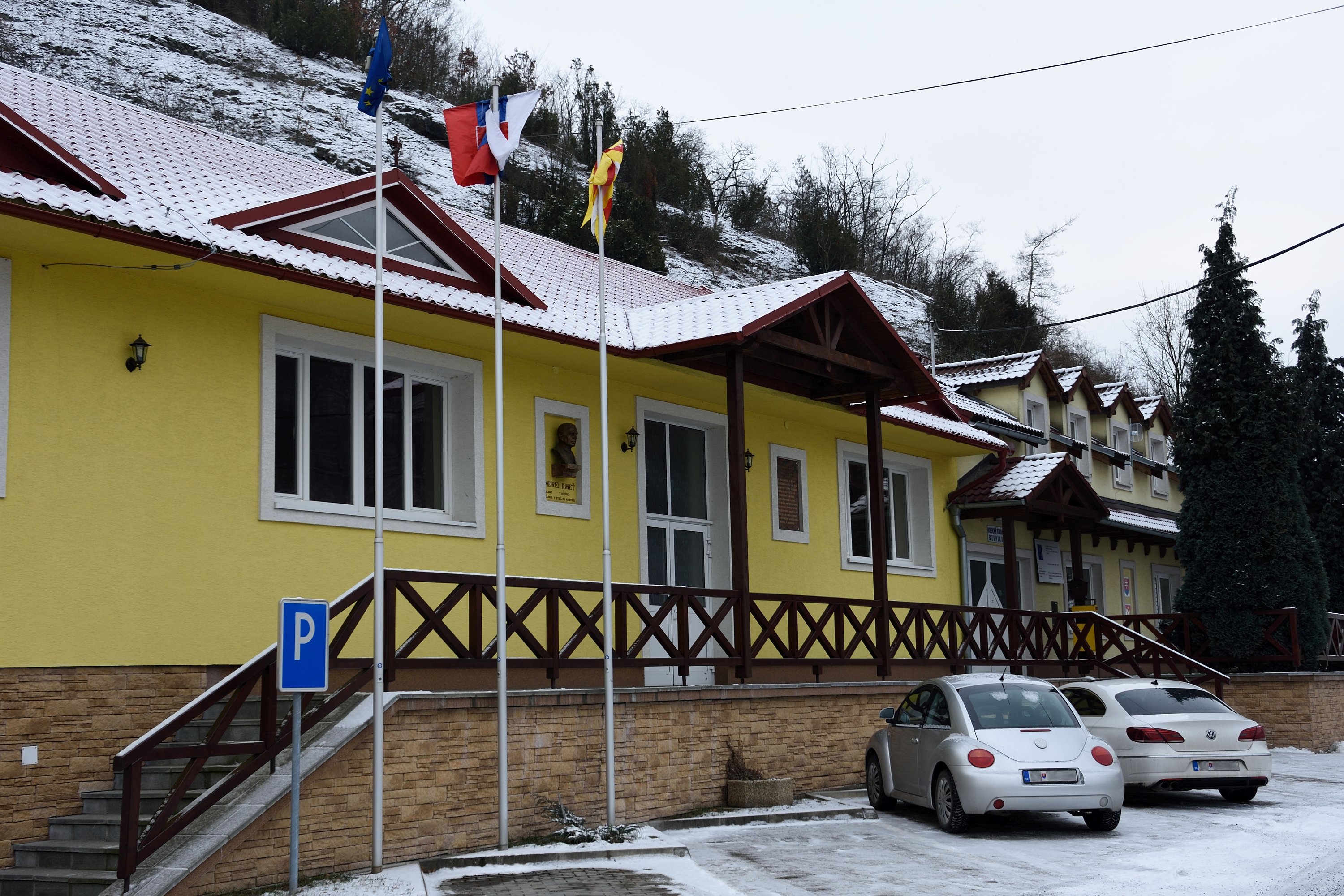

- Flag

- Location of Bzenica in the Banská Bystrica Region Location of Bzenica in Slovakia
- Coordinates: 48.53°N 18.75°E
- Country: Slovakia
- Region: Banská Bystrica Region
- District: Žiar nad Hronom District
- First mentioned: 1326

Government
  - Mayor: Viktor Debnár (NK / NEKA)

Area
  - Total: 19.04 km^{2} (7.35 sq mi)
- Elevation: 245 m (804 ft)

Population (2025)
  - Total: 642
- Time zone: UTC+1 (CET)
  - Summer (DST): UTC+2 (CEST)
- Postal code: 966 01
- Area code: +421 45
- Vehicle registration plate (until 2022): ZH
- Website: bzenica.sk

Bzenica (German: Senitz; Hungarian: Szénásfalu) is a village and municipality in Žiar nad Hronom District in the Banská Bystrica Region of central Slovakia.

== Geography ==
The municipality lies at an altitude of 245 metres (804 ft) and covers an area of 19.04 km^{2} (7.35 sq mi) (2025).

== History ==
The village was first mentioned in old charters in 1326 (Bezenche) as belonging to Levice feudatories. In the 16th century it passed to Repište and after to Banská Štiavnica. In the 16th century it belonged to noble families: Dóczy, Stefan and Zobony. In 1601 it passed to Šašov.

== Population ==
Population statistic (10 years)
Year	1995	2005	2015	2025
Count	574	545	582	642
Difference		−5.05%	+6.78%	+10.30%

Population statistic
Year	2024	2025
Count	646	642
Difference		−0.61%

It has a population of 642 people (31 December 2025).

=== Ethnicity ===
Census 2021 (1+ %)
Ethnicity	Number	Fraction
Slovak	601	97.88%
Not found out	10	1.62%
Total	614	

In year 2021 was 614 people by ethnicity 601 as Slovak, 10 as Not found out, 5 as Czech, 3 as Italian, 1 as Romani and 1 as Polish.

Note on population: The difference values of population numbers in the table "Population statistic" and in the sections "Ethnicity" & "Religion" is caused by the use of various statistical methods.

=== Religion ===
Census 2021 (1+ %)
Religion	Number	Fraction
Roman Catholic Church	494	80.46%
None	99	16.12%
Greek Catholic Church	8	1.3%
Total	614	

In year 2021 was 614 people by religion 494 from Roman Catholic Church, 99 from None, 8 from Greek Catholic Church, 6 from Evangelical Church, 3 from Calvinist Church, 3 from Not found out and 1 from Ad hoc movements.

== Famous people ==
- Andrej Kmeť, scientist

== Genealogical resources ==
The records for genealogical research are available at the state archive "Statny Archiv in Banska Bystrica, Slovakia"

- Roman Catholic church records (births/marriages/deaths): 1798-1905 (parish B)
- Lutheran church records (births/marriages/deaths): 1812-1895 (parish B)

== See also ==
- List of municipalities and towns in Slovakia
