= Jozef Fojtik =

Jozef Fojtik (born 1960 in Krupina, Slovakia) is famous for folk art wood carving. He began woodcarving about 1988 as a hobby.

He has worked extensively for Krupina, including for its mayor and for Catholic and Protestant churches in the area. His work has represented the city in many folk festivals. Some of his work has been given to important visitors, including Pope John Paul II.

His working themes include Christianity and ordinary people, working primarily on wall reliefs and sculptures.
