= Andrej Kmeť =

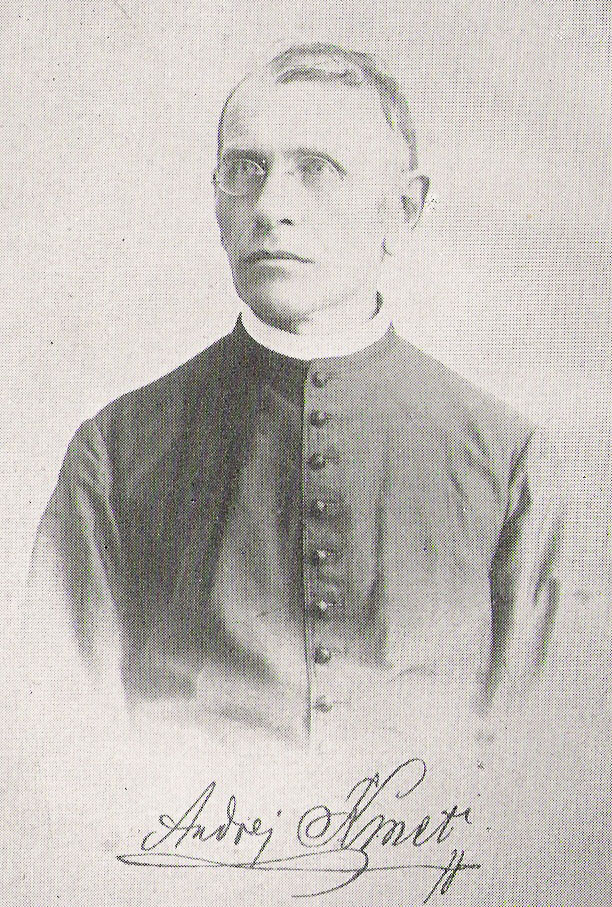
Andrej Kmeť

Andrej Kmeť (19 November 1841, Bzenica – 16 February 1908, Martin) was a Slovak Catholic priest, botanist, ethnographer, archaeologist, and geologist. He was a founder of the Slovak National Museum. Several species of fungi and plants have been named after him.

== Life and work ==
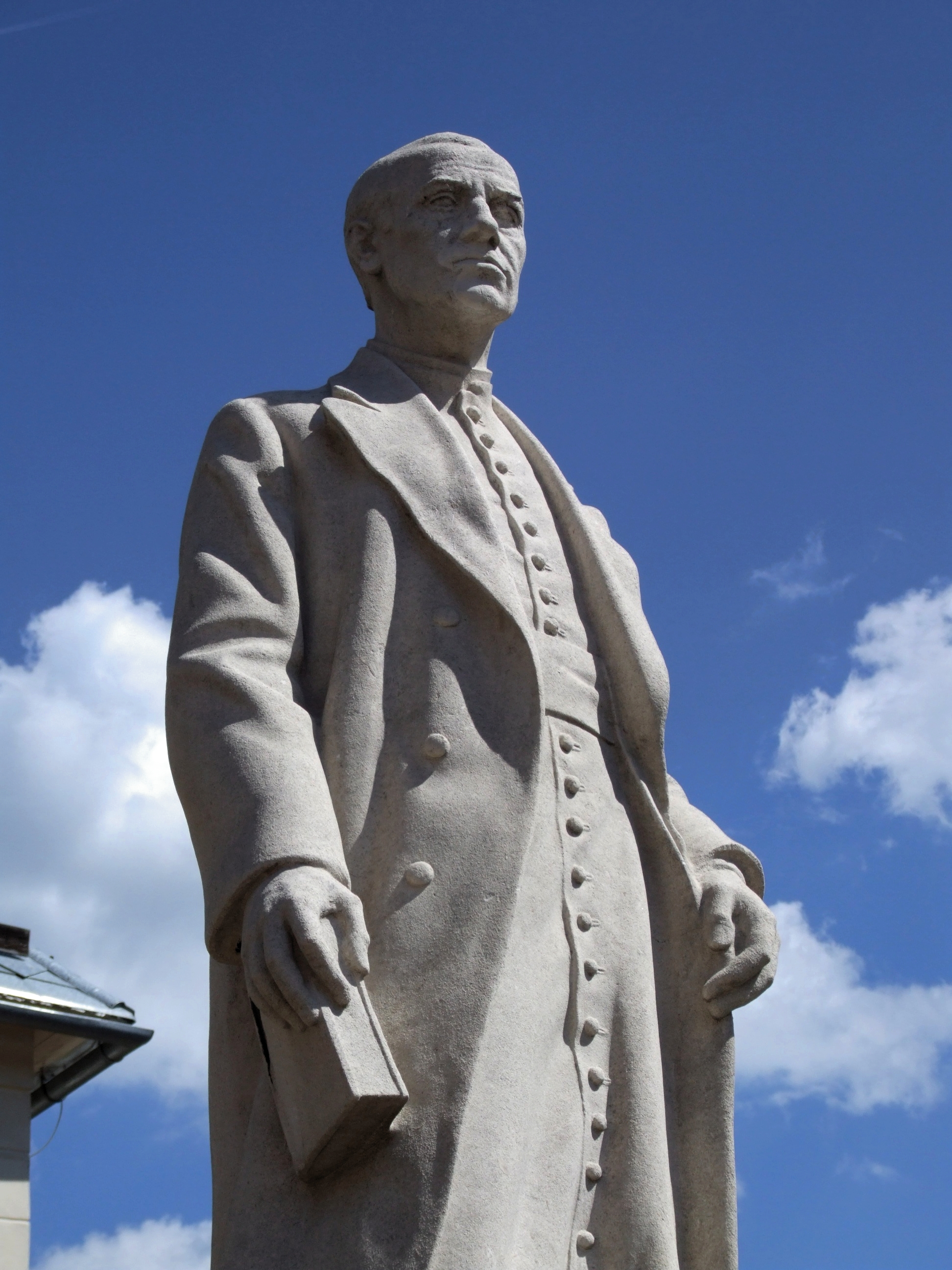
Statue of Andrej Kmeť in Banská Štiavnica

Kmeť was born in the Austrian Empire in Bzenica, today in Slovakia. He was the youngest of eight children of a blacksmith. After education at the local elementary and grammar schools he studied theology at Esztergom from 1861 and was ordained priest in 1865. He served as a curate at Senohrad (1865–1868) before becoming a priest at Krnišov (1868–1878) and Prenčov (1878–1906).

In his spare time, he collected plant specimens and created a herbarium with 72,000 specimens. Kmeť issued the exsiccata-like series Flora Schemnitziensis [or] Fungi Schemnitzienses and Flora Schemnitziensis [plants] widely distributed among herbaria. He collected in the Hont Region particularly in the Štiavnické vrchy. He was one of the first researchers who carried on modern archaeological excavations in Central Europe. He discovered a mammoth skeleton at Beš. In 1892, he founded the Slovak Learned Society (Slovak: Slovenská učená spoločnosť), which later became nucleus of the Slovak Academy of Sciences. He also was an initiator of the museum association in 1893 which led to collections being accumulated and the first museum which was established in 1906. He was also known for his activism against alcoholism. Andrej Kmeť retired in 1906 and lived in Turčiansky until his death and was interred in the National Cemetery in Martin.

== Works online ==
- Sitno a co s neho vidieť. Ružomberok: Fr. Rich. Osvald, 1901. 140 p. - available at ULB Digital Library
