= Fraňo Štefunko =

Slovak sculptor (1903–1974)

- Born: 4 August 1903; Dudváh-Vlčkovce, Austro-Hungary
- Died: 6 April 1974 (aged 70); Martin, Czechoslovakia
- Occupation: Sculptor

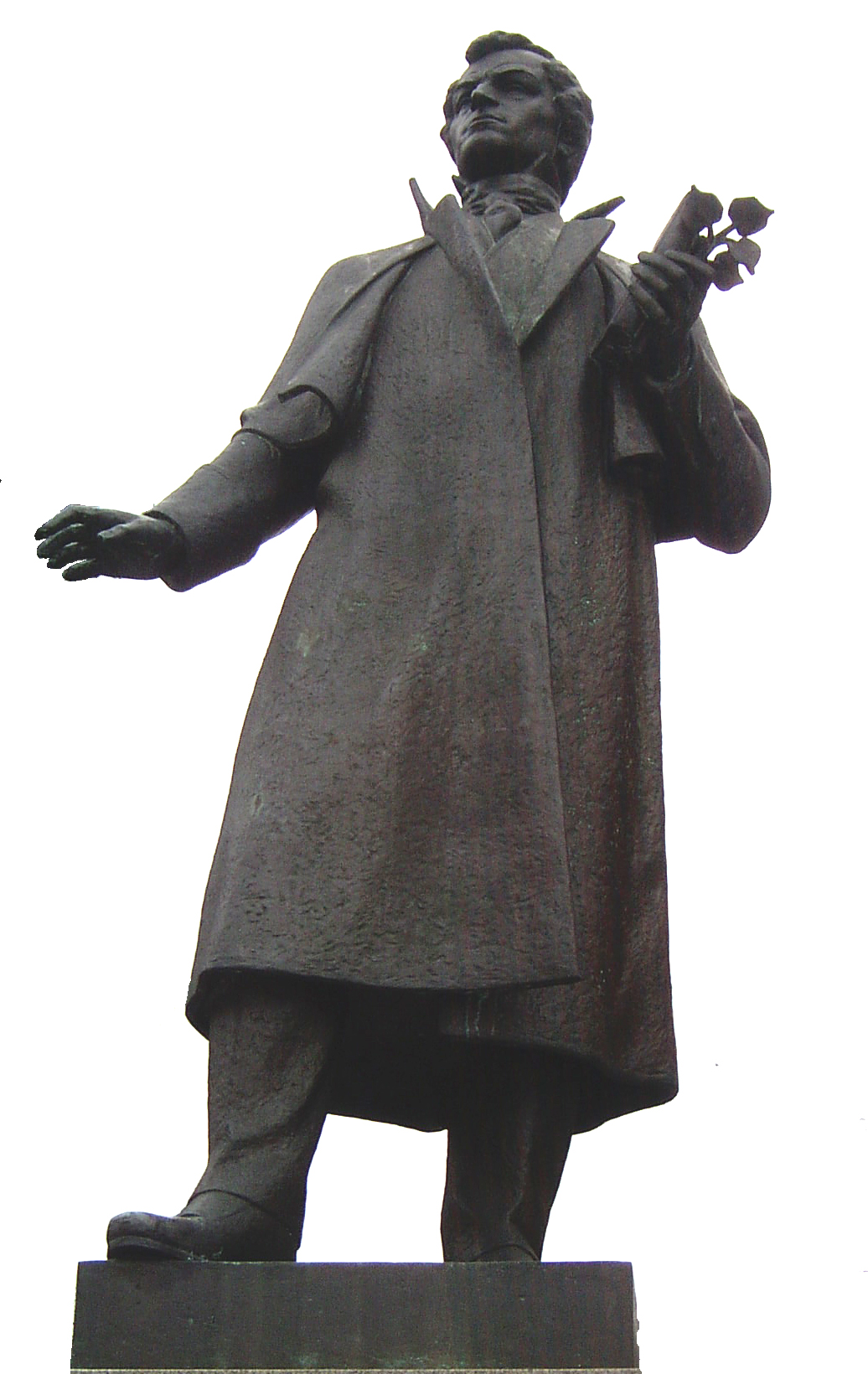
Sculpture of Ján Kollár in Mošovce by Fraňo Štefunko

Fraňo Štefunko (4 August 1903 – 6 April 1974) was a Slovak sculptor, art pedagogue and editor. In 1932 after his studies of art in Prague he moved to Martin. He was the editor of a graphical section of Slovenské pohľady, instructor of a carpentry course of the Activity Cultivation Institute, as well as a conservator with the Slovak National Museum. Štefunko begins with his freelance work two years after coming to Martin and soon becomes one of the founders of Slovak sculpture. In addition to the statues of many important personalities of Slovak history such as Pavol Országh Hviezdoslav or Ján Kollár and tombs of others (Miloslav Schmidt) he also dedicated his time to monuments in the field of Slovak history (historical figures, the World Wars, Slovak National Uprising).
