= Červenica =

Village and municipality in Slovakia

- Municipality
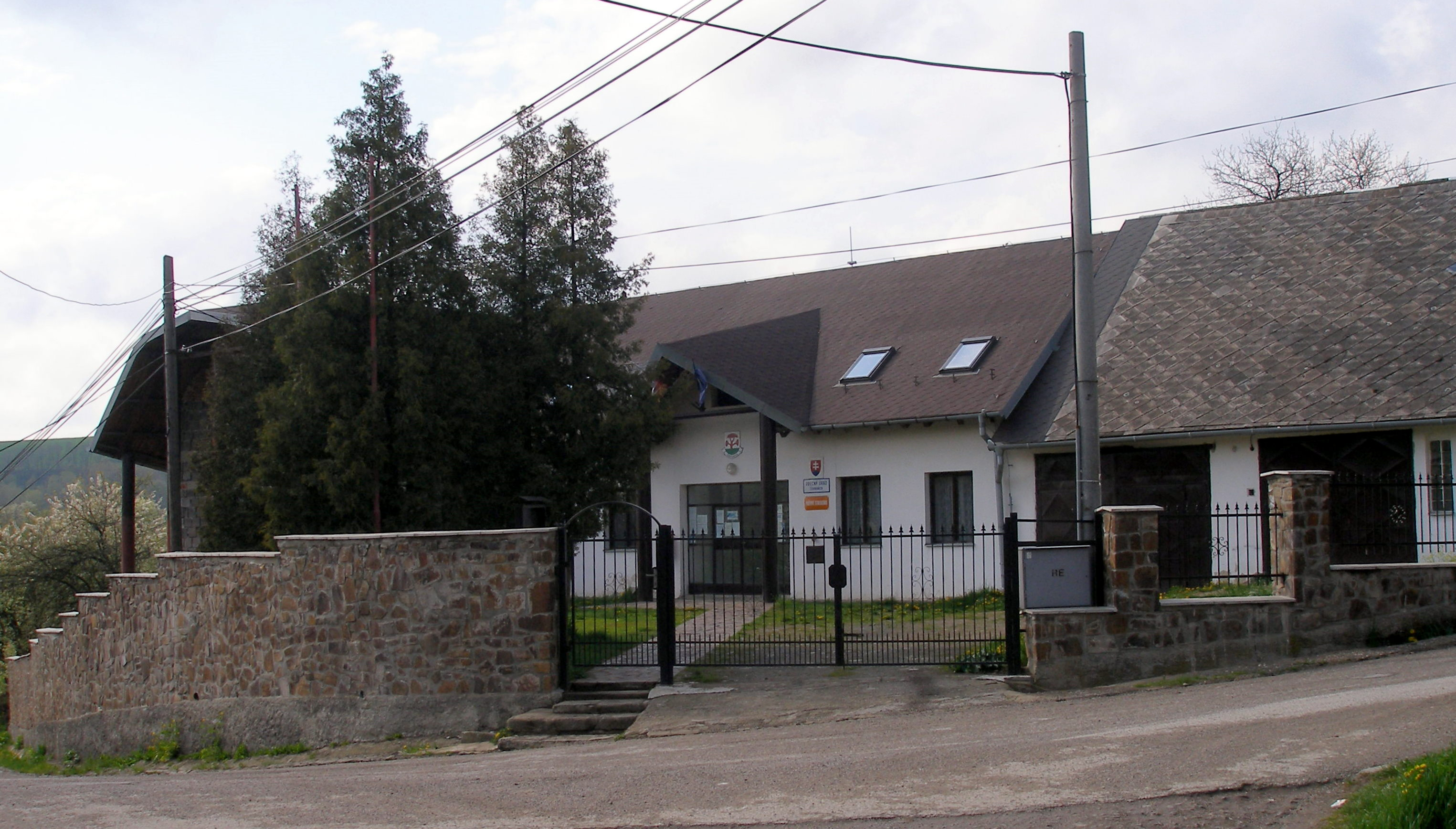

- Flag

- Location of Červenica in the Prešov Region Location of Červenica in Slovakia
- Coordinates: 48.88°N 21.45°E
- Country: Slovakia
- Region: Prešov Region
- District: Prešov District
- First mentioned: 1427

Area
  - Total: 17.81 km^{2} (6.88 sq mi)
- Elevation: 578 m (1,896 ft)

Population (2025)
  - Total: 1,121
- Time zone: UTC+1 (CET)
  - Summer (DST): UTC+2 (CEST)
- Postal code: 820 7
- Area code: +421 51
- Vehicle registration plate (until 2022): PO
- Website: www.obeccervenica.sk

Červenica is a village and municipality in Prešov District in the Prešov Region of eastern Slovakia.

== History ==
In historical records the village was first mentioned in 1427. Until the 19th century its mines were the only source of precious opal available to Europeans. During this period, the village was generally known, at least to outsiders, as Czernowitza. There are possibilities for tourists to visit former opal mines in the area.

== Points of interests ==
- Dubnik Transmitter

== Geography ==
The municipality lies at an altitude of 578 metres (1,896 ft) and covers an area of 17.81 km^{2} (6.88 sq mi) (2025).

== Population ==
Population statistic (10 years)
Year	1995	2005	2015	2025
Count	584	773	933	1121
Difference		+32.36%	+20.69%	+20.15%

Population statistic
Year	2024	2025
Count	1099	1121
Difference		+2.00%

It has a population of 1121 people (31 December 2025).

=== Ethnicity ===
Census 2021 (1+ %)
Ethnicity	Number	Fraction
Slovak	949	91.86%
Romani	669	64.76%
Not found out	63	6.09%
Total	1033	

In year 2021 was 1033 people by ethnicity 949 as Slovak, 669 as Romani, 63 as Not found out, 6 as Czech, 1 as Rusyn, 1 as Polish, 1 as German and 1 as Moravian.

Note on population: The difference values of population numbers in the table "Population statistic" and in the sections "Ethnicity" & "Religion" is caused by the use of various statistical methods.

=== Religion ===
Census 2021 (1+ %)
Religion	Number	Fraction
Roman Catholic Church	802	77.64%
Evangelical Church	78	7.55%
None	49	4.74%
Seventh-day Adventist Church	39	3.78%
Greek Catholic Church	29	2.81%
Not found out	21	2.03%
Total	1033	

In year 2021 was 1033 people by religion 802 from Roman Catholic Church, 78 from Evangelical Church, 49 from None, 39 from Seventh-day Adventist Church, 29 from Greek Catholic Church, 21 from Not found out, 9 from Apostolic Church, 4 from Jehovah's Witnesses, 1 from Buddhism and 1 from Ad hoc movements.

== Genealogical resources ==
The records for genealogical research are available at the state archive "Statny Archiv in Kosice, Presov, Slovakia"

- Roman Catholic church records (births/marriages/deaths): 1788–1895 (parish A)
- Greek Catholic church records (births/marriages/deaths): 1773–1895 (parish B)
- Lutheran church records (births/marriages/deaths): 1784–1895 (parish B)

== See also ==
- List of municipalities and towns in Slovakia
