= Krupina =

- Town
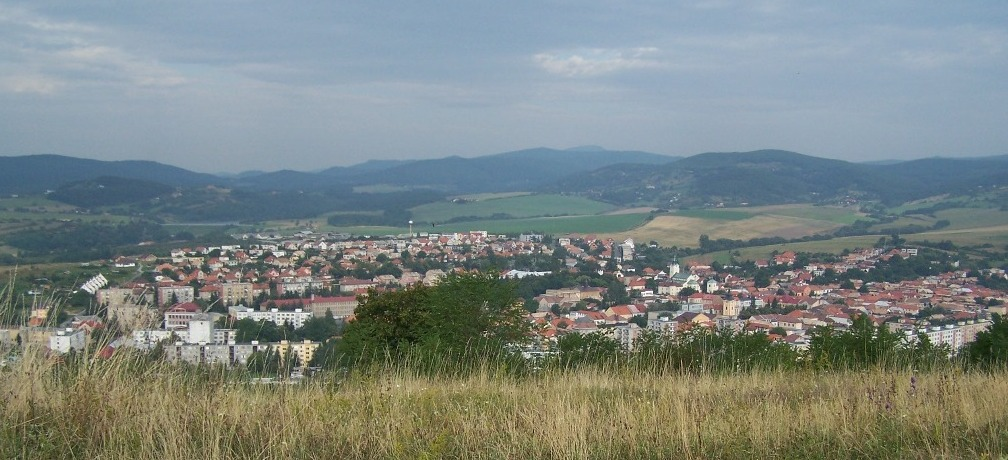
- View of Krupina

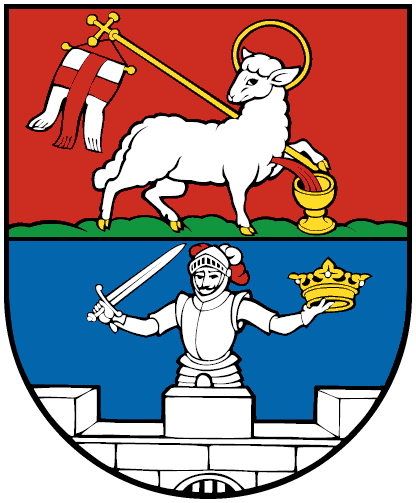
- Flag Coat of arms

- Location of Krupina in the Banská Bystrica Region Location of Krupina in Slovakia
- Coordinates: 48°21′13″N 19°04′00″E
- Country: Slovakia
- Region: Banská Bystrica Region
- District: Krupina District
- First mentioned: 1135

Government
  - Mayor: Radoslav Vazan

Area
  - Total: 88.66 km^{2} (34.23 sq mi)
- (2022)
- Elevation: 320 m (1,050 ft)

Population (2025)
  - Total: 7,496
- Time zone: UTC+1 (CET)
  - Summer (DST): UTC+2 (CEST)
- Postal code: 963 01
- Area code: 421-45
- Vehicle registration plate (until 2022): KA
- Website: www.krupina.sk

Krupina (German: Karpfen, Hungarian: Korpona) is a town in southern central Slovakia. It is part of the Banská Bystrica Region and has approximately 8,000 inhabitants.

== Etymology ==
The name is probably derived from Slavic root krup. Proto-Slavic: krǫpъ, krǫpъjь – solid, strong. The root is present also in krupa (krǫpa) – a smaller fortress, a fortified settlement, -ina is a frequent suffix. Another theory is based on the meaning "coarse". The settlement could be named after the nearby river, as the river had a rough and rocky bottom.

== History ==
The territory of modern-day Krupina was inhabited since the Neolithic, based on archaeological findings from the Bronze Age. The first written reference to the towns river dates back to 1135. The first people to inhabit it were the Slavs. Between the 12th and 13th century the Germans arrived in Krupina, later between the 17th and 18th centuries the Magyars (Hungarians). Along with Trnava, Krupina is the oldest town in Slovakia, having received town privileges in 1238. The settlement lay on a route known as the "via magna", connecting the Baltic Sea with the Adriatic. After the Mongol invasion of 1241/1242, when the town was sacked, it was rebuilt and received its town privileges again in 1244 and became a "free royal town".

The "Krupina law", based on the Magdeburg rights, was the basis for many towns in central and northern Slovakia. The deposits of gold and silver ran out in the 14th century and thereafter the town's economy was based on handicraft and agriculture. In the first half of the 15th century the town was threatened by the remains of the Hussites led by John Giskra. As the Turks advanced into the Kingdom of Hungary, the town built its town walls and sentry tower, and the Turks couldn't capture the town until 1682. It was also besieged in 1582, 1647 and 1678 and was ravaged in 1626 by Turks. Turks held it until 1686. Later, Krupina was involved in the Kuruc uprisings at the beginning of the 18th century, burnt down in 1708 and suffered from a plague in 1710. The first schools were opened in the 18th century. After the break-up of Austria-Hungary in 1918, the town became part of Czechoslovakia, was briefly occupied by the Slovak Soviet Republic in 1919, came back quickly into Czechoslovakia, and since 1993 has been a part of Slovakia.

Literature:

- Sliačan, J.: Krupina. Krupina, 1944.
- Zrebený, A.: Z feudálnych dejín Krupiny. Martin, 1974.
- Lukáč, M. et al.: Krupina - monografia mesta. Banská Bystrica, 2006 (with the English summary).

== Geography ==
The municipality lies at an altitude of 320 metres (1,050 ft) and covers an area of 88.66 km^{2} (34.23 sq mi) (2025). It lies on the Krupina Plain under the Štiavnica Mountains, halfway between Zvolen and Šahy. North of the town the Mäsiarsky bok national nature reserve with cliffs and stone seas is located.

== Population ==
Population statistic (10 years)
Year	1995	2005	2015	2025
Count	8045	7812	7945	7496
Difference		−2.89%	+1.70%	−5.65%

Population statistic
Year	2024	2025
Count	7524	7496
Difference		−0.37%

It has a population of 7496 people (31 December 2025).

=== Ethnicity ===
Census 2021 (1+ %)
Ethnicity	Number	Fraction
Slovak	7146	94.32%
Not found out	368	4.85%
Romani	79	1.04%
Total	7576	

In year 2021 was 7576 people by ethnicity 7146 as Slovak, 368 as Not found out, 79 as Romani, 31 as Czech, 30 as Hungarian, 22 as Other, 13 as Russian, 12 as Vietnamese, 8 as Polish, 8 as German, 5 as Rusyn, 4 as Moravian, 4 as English, 2 as Serbian, 2 as Croatian, 1 as Ukrainian, 1 as Italian, 1 as Silesian and 1 as French.

Note on population: The difference values of population numbers in the table "Population statistic" and in the sections "Ethnicity" & "Religion" is caused by the use of various statistical methods.

=== Religion ===
Census 2021 (1+ %)
Religion	Number	Fraction
Roman Catholic Church	4752	62.72%
None	1242	16.39%
Evangelical Church	1038	13.7%
Not found out	373	4.92%
Total	7576	

In year 2021 was 7576 people by religion 4752 from Roman Catholic Church, 1242 from None, 1038 from Evangelical Church, 373 from Not found out, 32 from Ad hoc movements, 29 from Greek Catholic Church, 19 from Other and not ascertained christian church, 16 from Paganism and natural spirituality, 13 from Jehovah's Witnesses, 13 from Seventh-day Adventist Church, 12 from Other, 9 from Buddhism, 7 from Christian Congregations in Slovakia, 5 from Eastern Orthodox Church, 4 from Islam, 4 from United Methodist Church, 3 from Calvinist Church, 2 from Old Catholic Church, 2 from Apostolic Church and 1 from Czechoslovak Hussite Church.

According to the 2014 census, the town had 8,010 inhabitants. In 2001 97.63% of the inhabitants were Slovaks, 1.14% Roma, 0.38% Czechs and 0.30% Hungarians. The religious make-up was 70.32% Roman Catholics, 17.91% Lutherans and 9.27% people with no religious affiliation.

== Twin towns — sister cities ==
Krupina is twinned with:

- Anykščiai, Lithuania
- Krapinske Toplice, Croatia
- Nepomuk, Czech Republic

== People ==
- Andrej Sládkovič (1820–1872), poet
- Jozef Fojtik (born 1960), folk artist
- Elena Maróthy-Šoltésová (1855–1939), writer and editor
- Bear-girl of Krupina, feral child allegedly discovered in 1767
