= Živena =

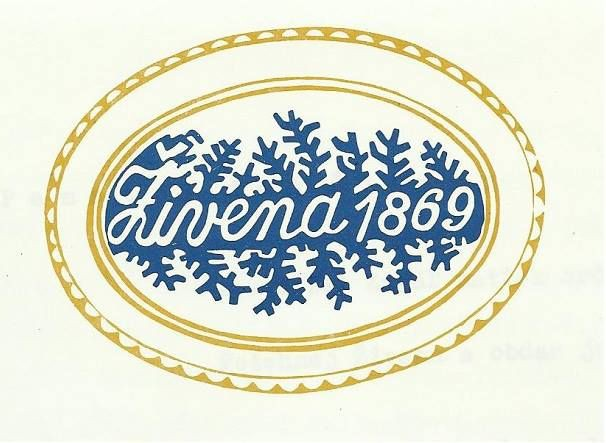
- Formation: 4 August 1869; 30 May 1990 (second establishment)
- Type: Women's organization
- Headquarters: Martin, Slovakia
- Location: P.O. Hviezdoslava 21
- Region served: Slovakia
- Official language: Slovak
- Chair: Alena Heribanová
- Website: www.zivena.net

The Živena, is the oldest women's rights organization in Slovakia, founded in 1869.

== History ==
=== Early days (1869–1918) ===
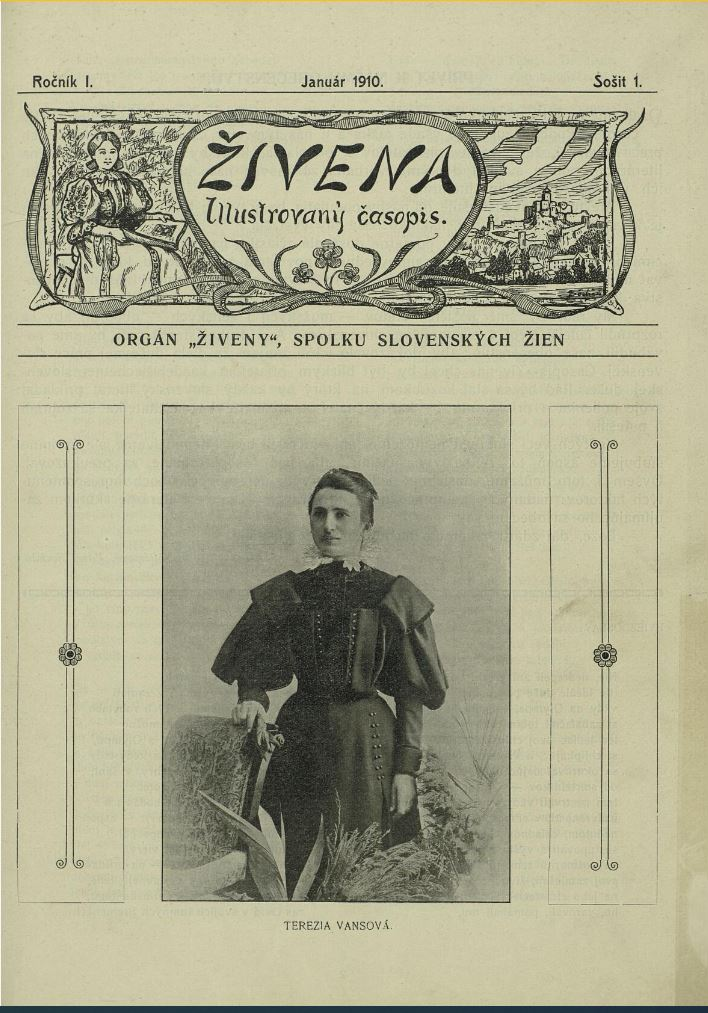
The cover page of the first edition of the Živena magazine

The original initiative came from mainly Lutheran nationalist intellectuals connected to Matica slovenská led by Ambro Pietro. These men were worried about the lack of involvement of women in their struggle for Slovak self-determination within Austria-Hungary. As a solution, they published a call for women to organize themselves and participate in the activities of the "national awakening". The call was initially answered by 73 women, who became the founding members of Živena (named after mythical ancient Slavic deity) at its initial meeting on 4 August 1869 in Martin. The initial stated aim of Živena was to educate Slovak women in the areas of household finance, cooking, child raising and culture. After the ban of Matica slovenská by the Hungarian authorities, Živena was the sole remaining Slovak educational organization.

The newly founded organization started publishing magazines, in particular for sharing literary works by Slovak women. They also organized a number of successful exhibitions of Slovak folk culture and craft works and founded a folklore group Lúčnica. While in the early years Živena was only active in the territory of Slovakia, from the early 1890s Živena started recruiting members among Slovak female emigrants, in particular in the United States.

The first leader of Živena was Anna Pivková, whose efforts were hindered by her residence in the village of Jasenová, far away from Martin. Additionally, some men within the leadership of Matica Slovesnká were opposed to feminist ideas and women's participation on public life in general. A strong faction led by the writer Svetozár Hurban-Vajanský used their influence to hinder the expansion of Živena.

In 1894, was succeeded as the chair of Živena by the writer Elena Maróthy-Šoltésová, under whose leadership the organization entered its most successful period.

=== Golden era (1918–1938) ===
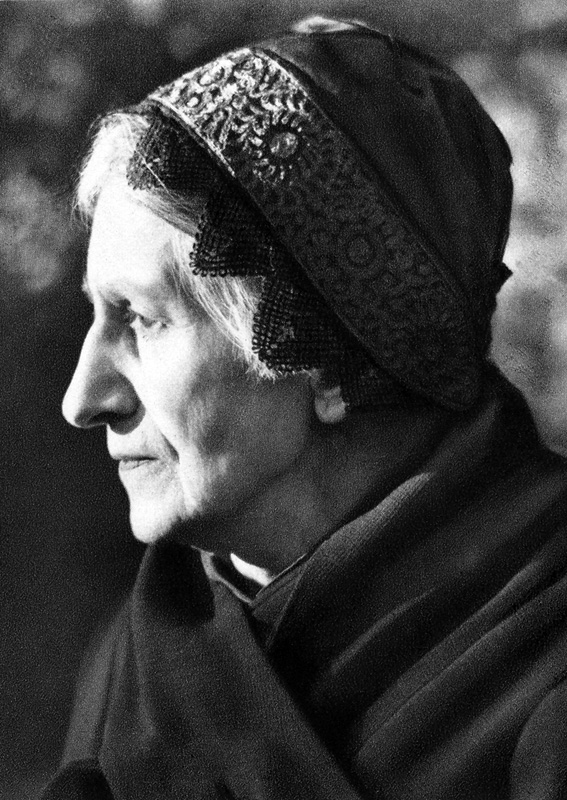
Elena Maróthy-Šoltesová

Živena enjoyed its golden period in the First Czechoslovak Republic. Since 1910, the organization published an eponymous magazine Živena, which quickly gained reputation as high quality intellectual venue for educated Slovaks of all genders.

In Martin, the organization operated a kindergarten (in 1919) and the first crèche (in 1922) located in the territory of Slovakia. In addition, Živena was involved in setting up a network of ten schools for girls. In 1927 Živena established a trade school for "women's occupations" in Prešov.

Maróthy-Šoltesová, along with other prominent members of Živena such as the writer Ľudmila Podjavorinská, was also very active as a public intellectual in this period, striving to promote her ideas of Christian feminism through Živena. Nonetheless, the impact of her ideas was largely limited to educated, urban women and the activities of Živena remained largely unknown in the countryside.

In 1927 Maróthy-Šoltésová was succeeded as the chair of Živena by Anna Halašová.

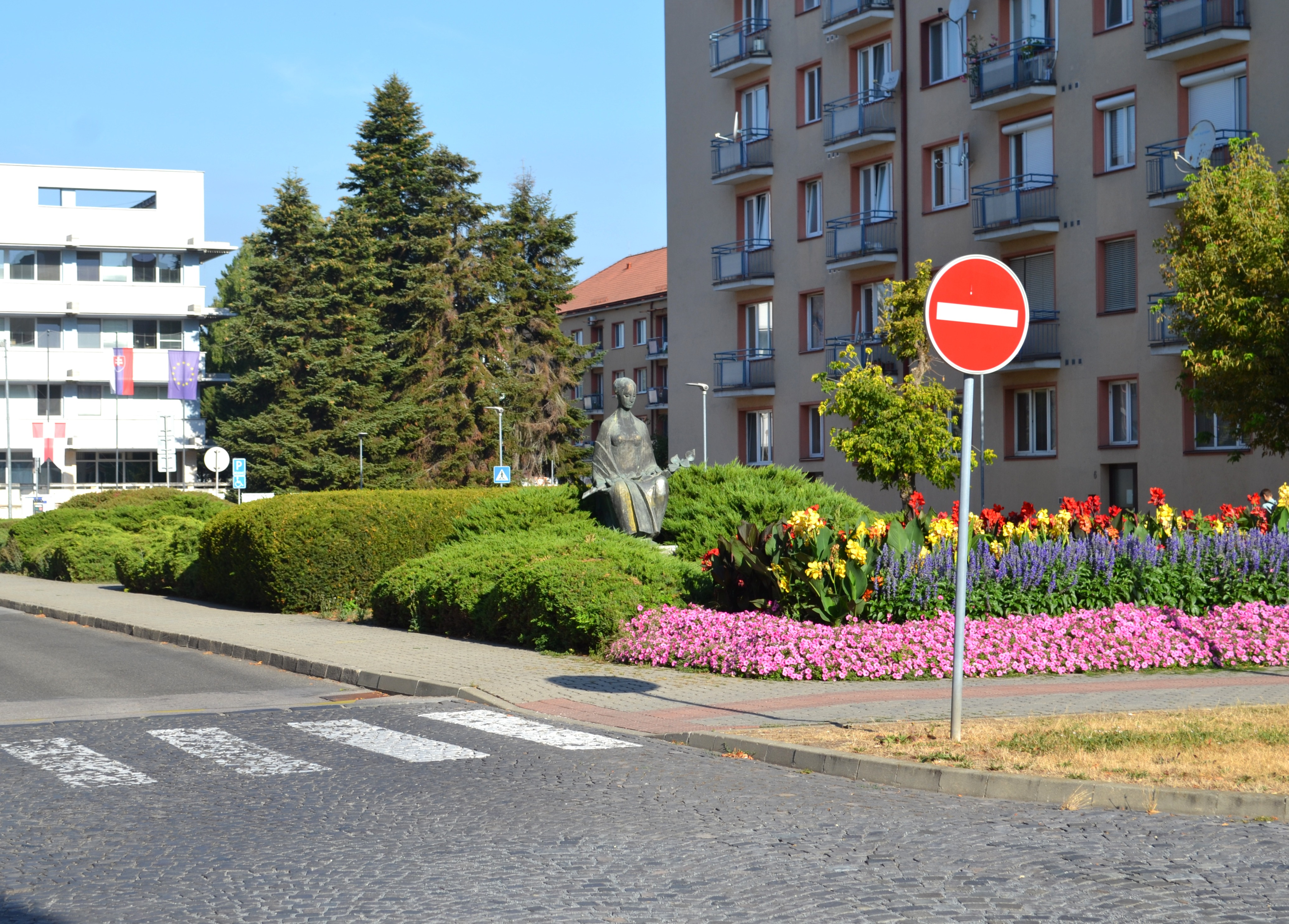
A statue of the goddess Živena produced by the sculptor Jarmila Podzimková-Mráčková in Zvolen, on the occasion of the 50th anniversary of founding of Živena branch in the town

=== Decline and dissolution of Živena (1938–1955) ===
During the period of fascist and communist regimes, Živena was increasingly marginalized. In 1945, Halašová was succeeded as chair by Mária Pietrová. In 1955 the organization was officially dissolved and the name Živena was used for a newly established edition of women's literature.

=== Modern itineration (1990–) ===
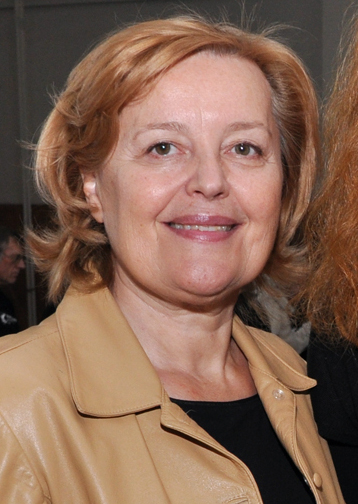
Magdaléna Vášáryová

Živena was again established in 1990, right after the restoration of democracy after the Velvet Revolution. Its first chair Hana Zelinová led the organization only for 3 years due to her decision to run for parliament and conviction that Živena should remain unpartisan. Zelinová and her successor Zora Breierová worked hard to restore the original tradition of the organization. A fundamental role in their efforts was played by Jozef Kubík, a member of Matica Slovenská and the original Živena, who had safeguarded documents of the original organization during the times it was banned.

In 2013, Breierová was replaced by the actress, politician and diplomat Magdaléna Vášáryová. By 2019, the membership of Živena grew to about 1,000.

In 2022, the writer and TV host Alena Heribanová was elected the new chair of Živena.

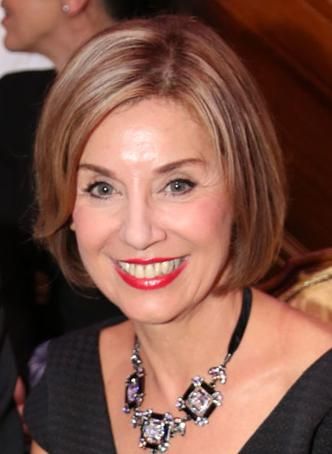
Alena Heribanová

== Chairs ==
The following women held the position of the chair of Živena over the course of its history:

- 1869–1894 Anna Pivková (née Ballová; 1835–1921)
- 1894–1927 Elena Maróthy-Šoltésová (1855–1939)
- 1927–1945 Anna Halašová (née Mudroňová; 1864–1954)
- 1945–1948 Mária Pietrová (1879–1956)
- 1990–1993 Hana Zelinová (1914–2004)
- 1993–2013 Zora Breierová (born 1924)
- 2013–2022 Magdaléna Vášáryová (born 1948)
- 2022 - Alena Heribanová (born 1955)
