= Ratková =

Ratková Ratkó
- Municipality
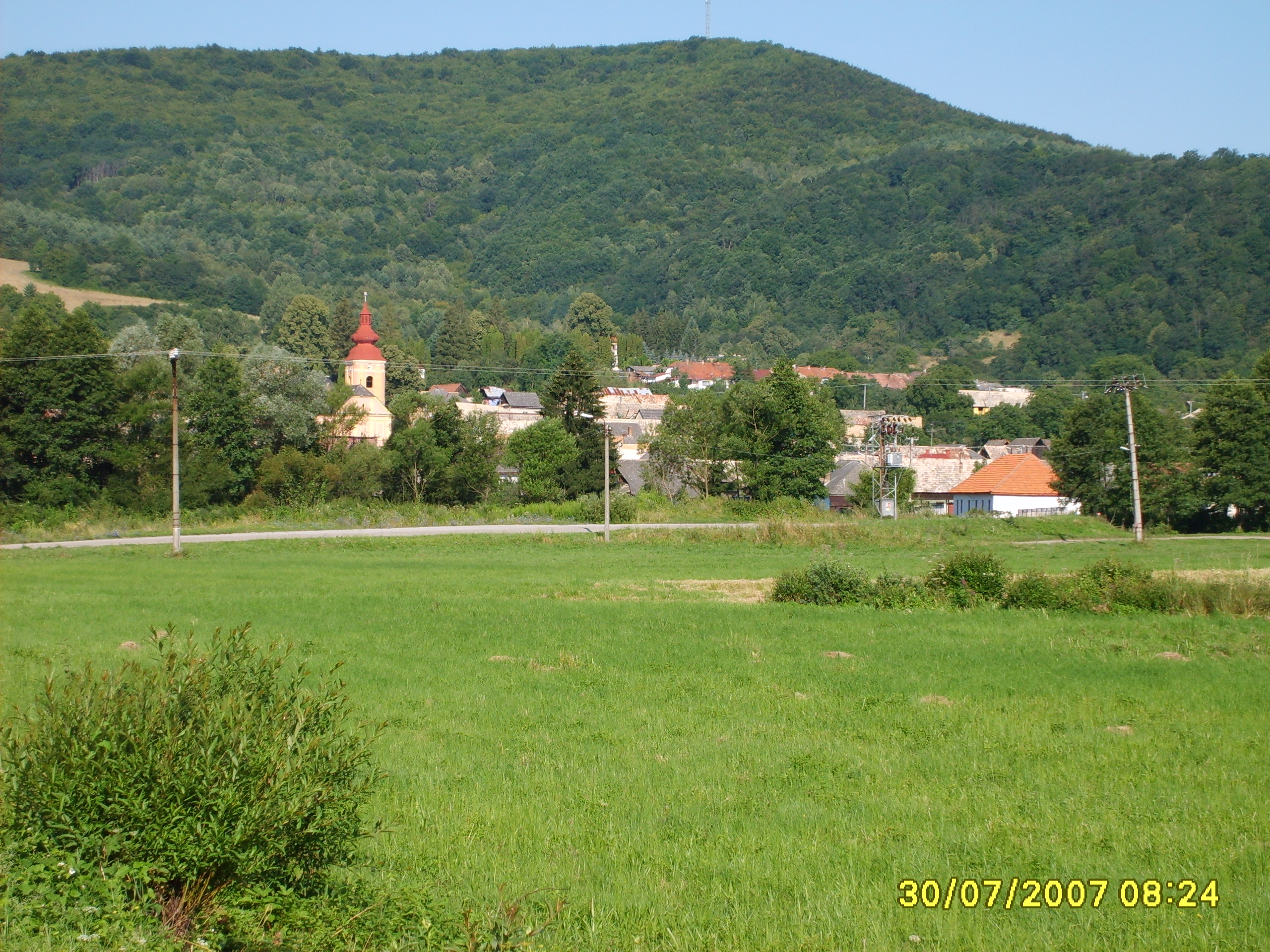

- Flag

- Location of Ratková in the Banská Bystrica Region Location of Ratková in Slovakia
- Coordinates: 48.59°N 20.10°E
- Country: Slovakia
- Region: Banská Bystrica Region
- District: Revúca District
- First mentioned: 1413

Area
  - Total: 12.71 km^{2} (4.91 sq mi)
- Elevation: 289 m (948 ft)

Population (2025)
  - Total: 663
- Time zone: UTC+1 (CET)
  - Summer (DST): UTC+2 (CEST)
- Postal code: 982 65
- Area code: +421 47
- Vehicle registration plate (until 2022): RA
- Website: www.obecratkova.sk

Ratková (Hungarian: Ratkó) is a village and municipality in Revúca District in the Banská Bystrica Region of Slovakia.

== Geography ==
The municipality lies at an altitude of 289 metres (948 ft) and covers an area of 12.71 km^{2} (4.91 sq mi) (2025).

== Population ==
Population statistic (10 years)
Year	1995	2005	2015	2025
Count	525	568	608	663
Difference		+8.19%	+7.04%	+9.04%

Population statistic
Year	2024	2025
Count	650	663
Difference		+2%

It has a population of 663 people (31 December 2025).

=== Ethnicity ===
Census 2021 (1+ %)
Ethnicity	Number	Fraction
Slovak	558	89.71%
Romani	87	13.98%
Not found out	50	8.03%
Hungarian	10	1.6%
Total	622	

In year 2021 was 622 people by ethnicity 558 as Slovak, 87 as Romani, 50 as Not found out, 10 as Hungarian, 4 as Czech, 3 as German, 2 as Ukrainian, 2 as Rusyn and 1 as Other.

Note on population: The difference values of population numbers in the table "Population statistic" and in the sections "Ethnicity" & "Religion" is caused by the use of various statistical methods.

=== Religion ===
Census 2021 (1+ %)
Religion	Number	Fraction
Roman Catholic Church	244	39.23%
Evangelical Church	168	27.01%
None	141	22.67%
Not found out	45	7.23%
Jehovah's Witnesses	10	1.61%
Total	622	

In year 2021 was 622 people by religion 244 from Roman Catholic Church, 168 from Evangelical Church, 141 from None, 45 from Not found out, 10 from Jehovah's Witnesses, 4 from Greek Catholic Church, 3 from United Methodist Church, 2 from Eastern Orthodox Church, 1 from Old Catholic Church, 1 from Calvinist Church, 1 from Christian Congregations in Slovakia, 1 from Buddhism and 1 from Ad hoc movements.
