= Daniel Rapant =

Slovak archivist and historian

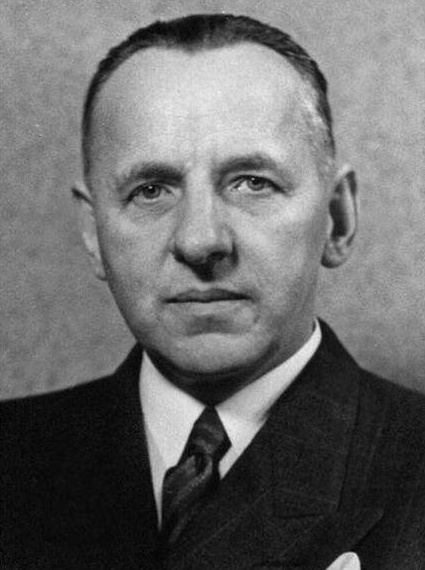
- Born: 17 April 1897; Holíč, Austria-Hungary (now Slovakia)
- Died: 17 April 1988 (aged 91); Bratislava, Czechoslovakia (now Slovakia)
- Occupations: historian, archivist, university teacher

Daniel Rapant (17 April 1897 Holíč, Austria-Hungary – 17 April 1988 Bratislava, Czechoslovakia) was a Slovak historian, archivist and university teacher.

== Life ==
He graduated in Skalica in 1917 then he had studied history and Slavic studies at the Faculty of Arts, Charles University in Prague (1918–1922). At the same time he had studied also at the State Archivist School in Prague (1919–1922). After completing his studies in Czechoslovakia, he studied at Paris-Sorbonne University. In 1924 he became the main county archivist in Bratislava.

He worked as a professor of the Czechoslovak history at Comenius University (1933 – extraordinary professor, 1938 – ordinary professor). In 1938–1939 he was the head of Czechoslovak-Hungarian Commission for Minority Questions. In 1945 he became rector of Comenius University. In 1945–1947 he was a dean of the Faculty of Arts, Comenius University.

== Selected works ==
- Asimilácia odrodilých Slovákov (Mladé Slovensko č. 3-4/1921)
- Národ a dejiny (1924)
- Národ a československá otázka (1925)
- K počiatkom maďarizácie. I. diel. Vývoj rečovej otázky v Uhorsku 1740–1790 (Sp. fil. fak. Bratislava 1927)
- Maďarizácia, Trianion, revízia a demokracia (Prúdy 1930)
- Maďarónstvo Bernolákovo (Bratislava 1930)
- Československé dejiny. Problémy a metódy (1930)
- K počiatkom maďarizácie. II. diel. Prvé zákony maďarizačné 1790–1792 (Bratislava 1931)
- O Starý Liptov (1934)
- Slovenské povstanie v roku 1848–1849, I/1-2—V/1-2 (1937, 1947, 1948, 1950, 1954, 1956, 1958, 1961, 1963, 1967, 1972)
- Pribinov nitriansky kostolík (1941)
- Doba štúrovská (1942)
- Slovenský prestolný prosbopis z roku 1842 (Tranoscius, Liptovský Mikuláš 1943)
- Viedenské memorandum slovenské z roku 1861 (1943)
- Ilegálna maďarizácia 1790–1840 (1947)
- Tatrín. Osudy a zápasy (1950)
- Sedliacke povstanie na východnom Slovensku roku 1831. I/1-3 (1953)
- Slováci v dejinách (Slovenské pohľady č. 3/1968)
- Logika dejín (Kultúrny život č. 33/1968)

== Awards ==
- 1968 – National Award of Slovak Socialistic Republic
- 1969 – Honour Badge of Labour
- 1987 – Gold Medal of Slovak Academy of Sciences
- 1991 – Order of Tomáš Garrigue Masaryk, 1st class (in memoriam)
