= List of menhirs =

The following is an alphabetical list of menhirs, also known as standing stones, by subcontinents and nations.

== Africa ==
=== Horn of Africa ===
Ancient standing stones are found throughout the Horn of Africa. Several of these old menhirs exist in Qohaito, Eritrea, and date to a period before the founding of the Kingdom of Axum. The Axumites themselves also erected a number of large stelae, which served a religious purpose in pre-Christian times. One of these granite columns is the largest such structure in the world, standing at 90 feet.

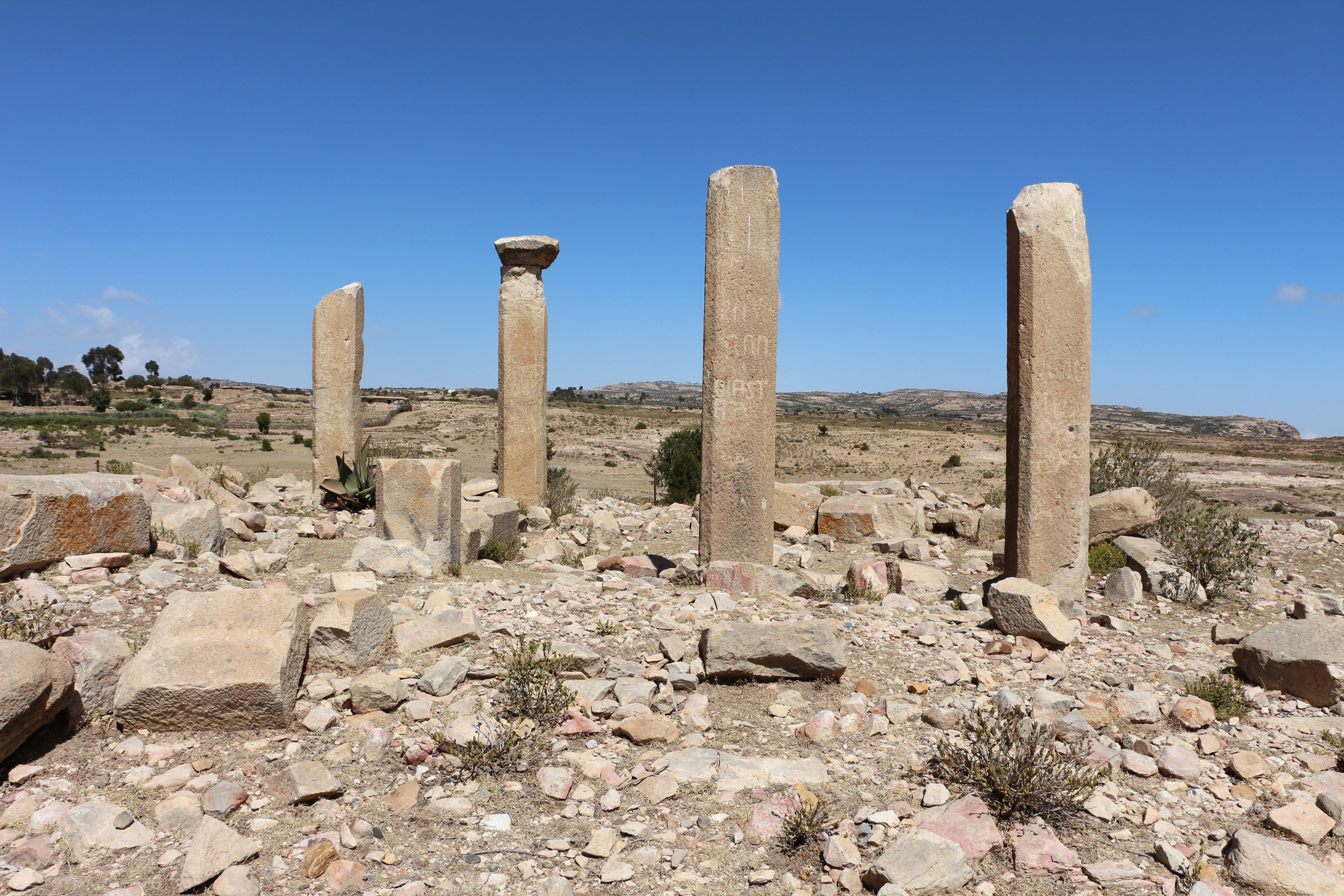
Pre-Axumite standing stones in Qohaito, Eritrea

In northeastern Somalia, on the coastal plain 20 km to Alula's east are found ruins of an ancient monument in a platform style. The structure is formed by a rectangular drystone wall that is low in height; the space in between is filled with rubble and manually covered with small stones. Relatively large standing stones are also positioned on the edifice's corners. Near the platform are graves, which are outlined in stones. 24 m by 17 m in dimension, the structure is the largest of a string of ancient platform and enclosed platform monuments exclusive to far northeastern Somalia. Additionally, around 200 stone monuments (taalos) are found in the northeastern Botiala site, most of which consist of cairns. There are a number of rows of standing stones on the eastern side of the structures, which are similar to those at Salweyn, a great cairn-held situated close to Heis. Besides cairns, the Botiala area also features a few other drystone monuments. These include disc monuments with circular, ground-level features, as well as low, rectangular platform monuments. Burial sites near Burao in the northwestern part of the country likewise feature a number of old stelae.

Additionally, between Djibouti City and Loyada in Djibouti are a number of anthropomorphic and phallic stelae. The structures are associated with graves of rectangular shape flanked by vertical slabs, as also found in central Ethiopia. The Djibouti-Loyada stelae are of uncertain age, and some of them are adorned with a T-shaped emblem.

In Ethiopia, the town of Tiya contains 36 menhirs (standing stones) or stelae. Of these, 32 are engraved with swords and other mysterious symbols. The ancient structures suggest the presence of a large, prehistoric burial complex. The archaeological site was designated a World Heritage Site in 1980.

== Asia ==
=== India ===
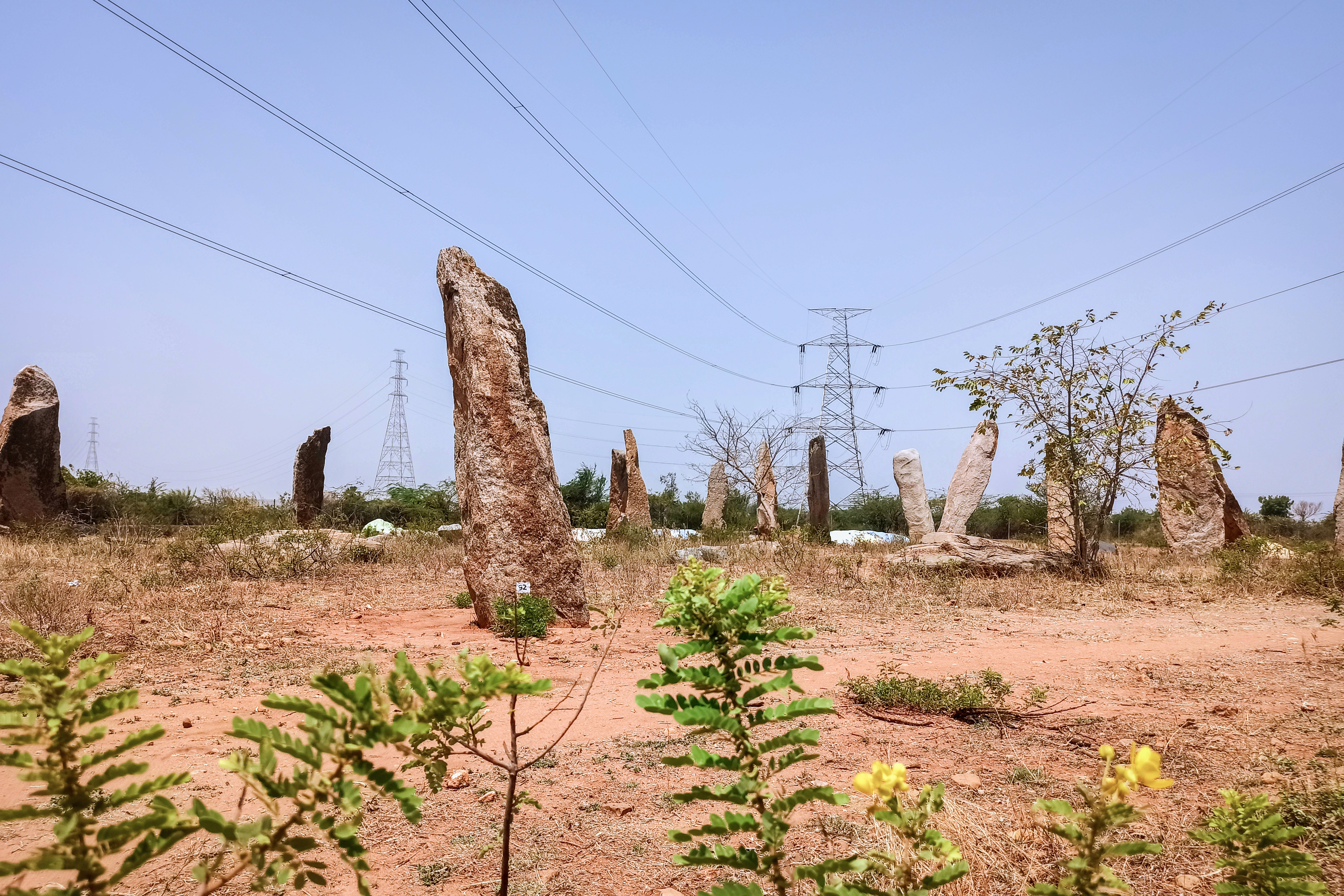
Mudumal Megalithic Menhirs in Telangana, India

Menhirs are found all across India. They can be as tall as 20 to 14 feet (over 4.2 m), and several hundred smaller menhirs scattered all over the agricultural fields, mountains, and various geographical areas. Rao and his team visited the menhir site in Telangana on the days of summer and winter solstice and equinox and found that particular rows of stones were aligned to the rising and setting sun on these days. "This suggests the megalithic community here was aware of the solar trajectories," he said.

In 2019, four menhirs and nearly 1,000 small and big dolmens were found in India at the Pothamala hills at the Kerala-Tamil Nadu border. In 2023, four menhirs of megalithic age were discovered near Melkote, Karnataka.

=== Iran ===
Menhirs in Iran are found in different villages and areas of East Azarbaijan Province, meshkin shahr(pirazmian) and Amlash and Deylaman areas in Gilan. A double menhir is also situated on Kharg Island in the Persian Gulf.

Menhirs are called Sang-Afrāsht (سنگ‌افراشت) in Persian, and there are different studies published in Iranian periodicals about the details of the Iranian menhirs, specially in the periodical "Barrasiha-yi Tarikhi" (Historical studies).

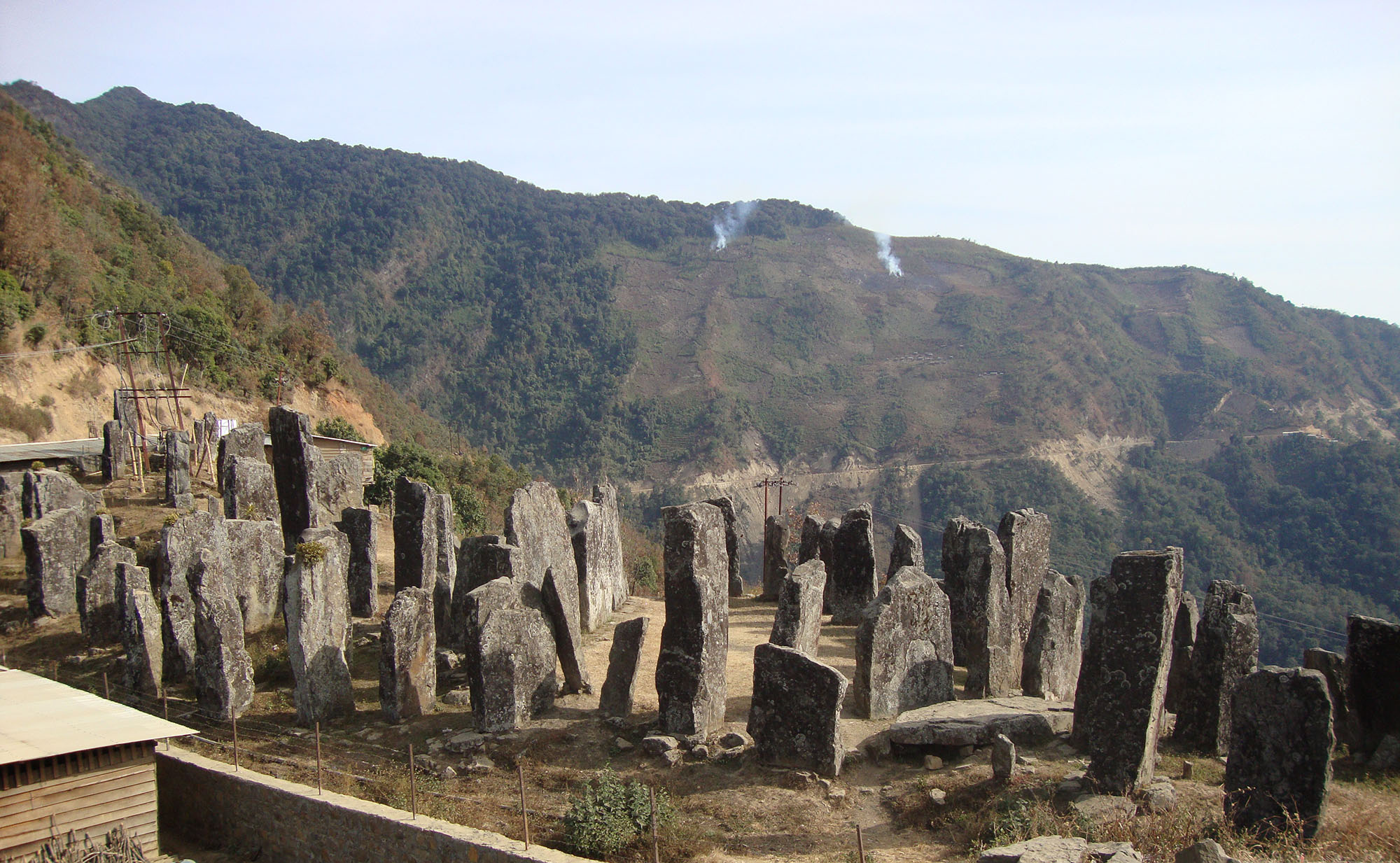
Menhir in Senapati District, Manipur, India

=== Israel ===
The Hebrew term for "standing stone" is masseba, pl. massebot (also written matseva, matsevot). The most famous examples are from the Canaanite High Place at Tell Jezar, comprising a straight row of ten stone stelae and a square stone basin, all erected simultaneously during the Middle Bronze Age.

=== Indonesia ===
Menhirs are found in Indonesia, except for the easternmost tip, namely New Guinea. At one of the famous prehistoric sites in Indonesia, the Pahoman Site in Banten there is a menhir stone which is strongly suspected to originate from the Gunung Karang civilization which was inhabited by ancient Sundanese.

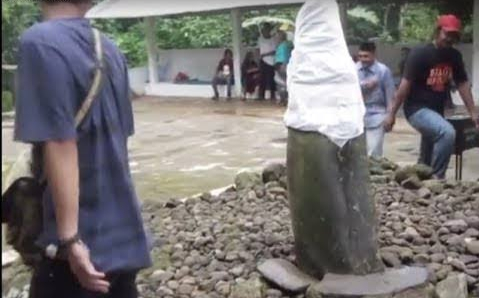
Menhir at the Pahoman Site in Pasir Peuteuy, Indonesia

== Europe ==
=== Armenia ===
Numerous menhirs dot the lands across Armenia, where they are called vishapakar (Armenian: Վիշապաքար). Vishap translates to "dragon" or "serpent" and kar translates to "stone". The stones are cigar-shaped, and are typically 10 to 20 feet (3.0 to 6.1 metres) tall. They are often found in the mountains near the sources of rivers or lakes. A large number of them have been carved in the shape of a fish. The earliest known vishapakar is thought to date from between the 18th to 16th centuries BC. An inscription in ancient Urartian cuneiform written upon a vishap at the temple of Garni shows that they were created prior to the Urartian Kingdom (pre-8th century).

=== Bulgaria ===
Several menhirs are known in Bulgaria: next to the museum in Haskovo, in the village of Ovcharovo, in the village of Pethocladentsi, in the village of Stegerovo, Staroseltsi village, in Strelcha.

=== Czech Republic ===
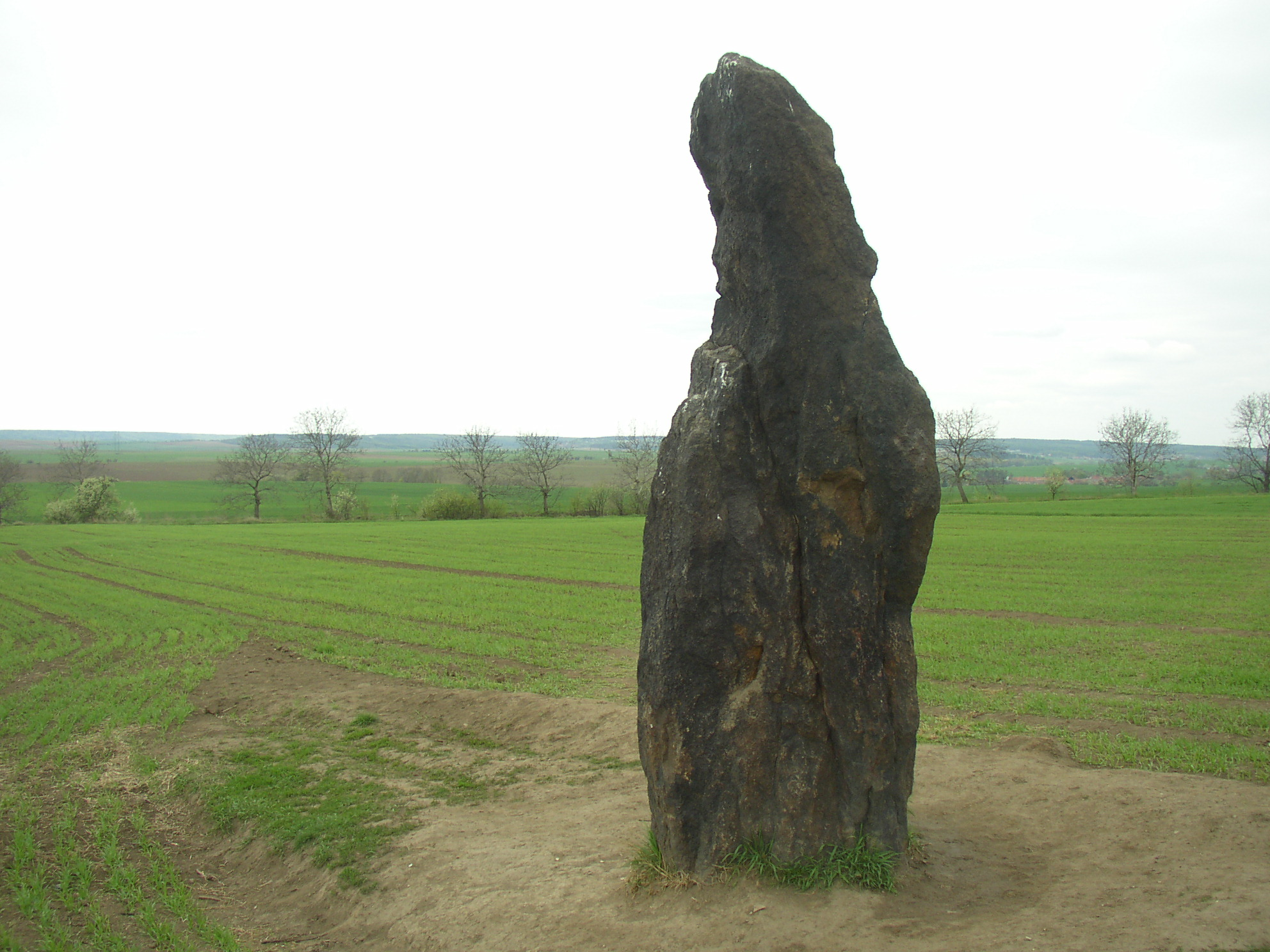
Kamenný pastýř near Klobuky, Czech Republic

A number of menhirs exist in the Czech Republic. There are about 40 real menhirs in the country, and dozens of stones which could also be menhirs. Others have been erected recently. The largest real menhir is Kamenný pastýř ("stony shepherd") near Klobuky, with a height of 3.3 metres (10.8 ft). Czech menhirs are probably the last outcrop of similar buildings in northern Germany.

=== France ===
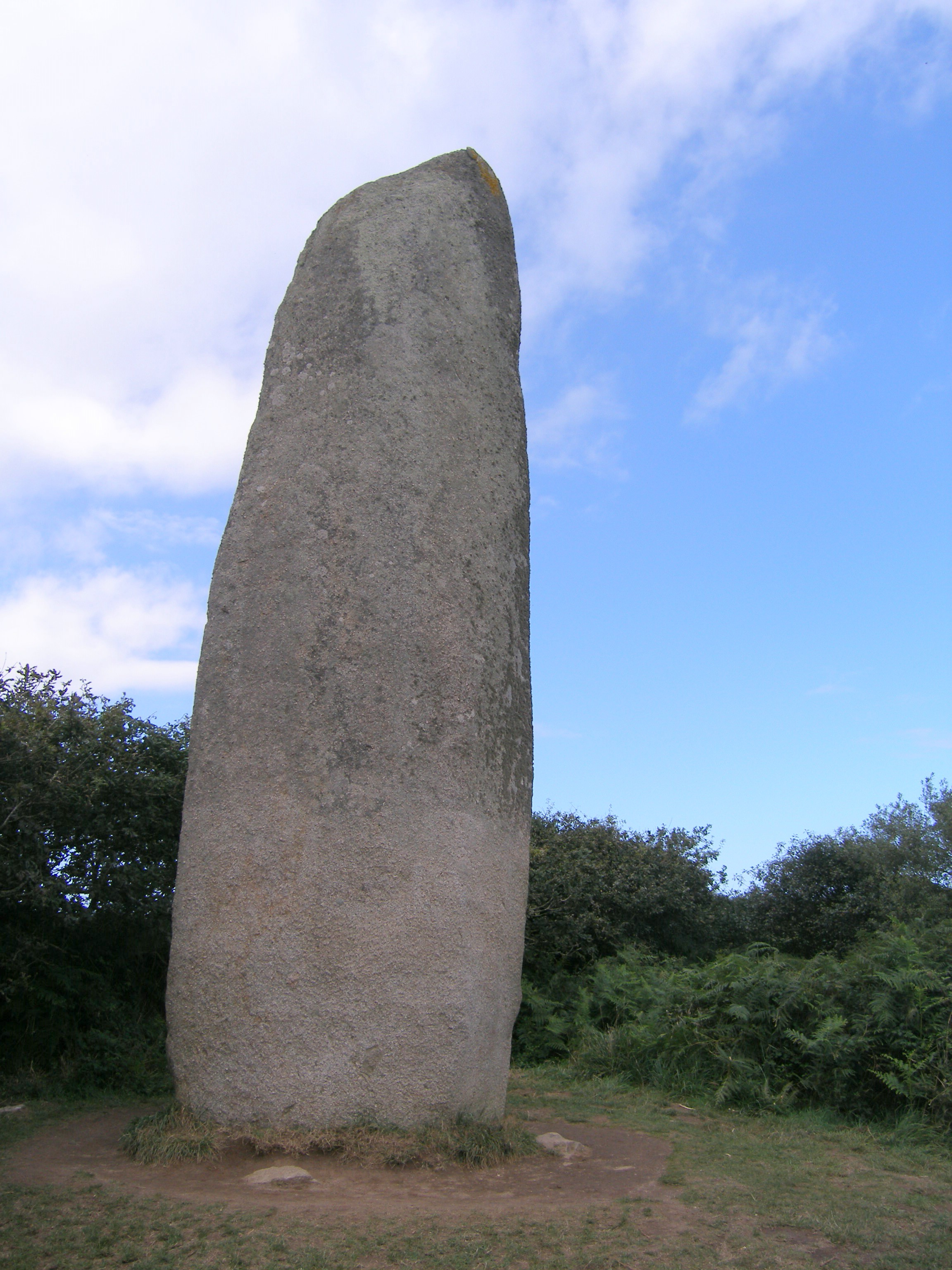
The Kerloas menhir, the tallest standing menhir in Brittany

Brittany stands out in the distribution of menhirs by virtue of both the density of monuments and the diversity of types. The largest surviving menhir in the world is located in Locmariaquer, Brittany, and it is known as the Grand Menhir Brisé (Great Broken Menhir). Once nearly 20.6 m (68 ft) high, today, it lies fractured into four pieces, but it would have weighed near 330 tons when intact. It is placed third after the Thunder Stone in St. Petersburg and the Western Stone in the Western Wall as the heaviest object moved by humans without powered machinery.

A 4.5 meter menhir can be seen on the side of Le Mans Cathedral. It was moved there in 1778 when the dolmen it was associated with was destroyed.

Alignments of menhirs are common, the most famous being the Carnac stones in Brittany, where more than 3000 individual menhirs are arranged in four groups and arrayed in rows stretching across four kilometres. Each set is organised with the tallest stones at the western end and shorter ones at the eastern end. Some end with a semicircular cromlech, but many have since fallen or been destroyed.

The second largest concentration of menhirs in France is at the Cham des Bondons, which is located on high open limestone plain in the granitic Cévennes. Today, the site is protected by the Parc National des Cévennes. From the time pastoralism was established, the site was kept open by controlled burning and grazing.

The menhir de la Tiemblais is located in Saint-Samson-sur-Rance.

On the island of Corsica, menhirs are found in Filitosa, a megalithic site in southern Corsica. The period of occupation spans from the end of the Neolithic era and the beginning of the Bronze Age, until around the Roman times in Corsica.

=== Ireland ===
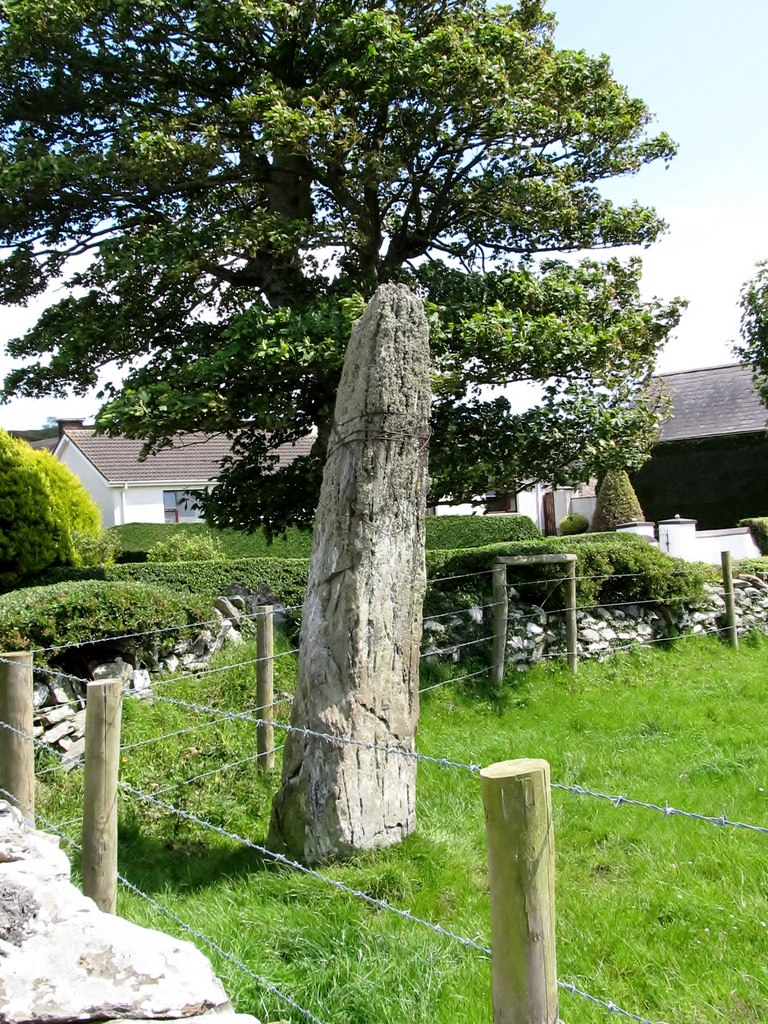
The Long Stone at Carrownacaw, Raholp, Co Down

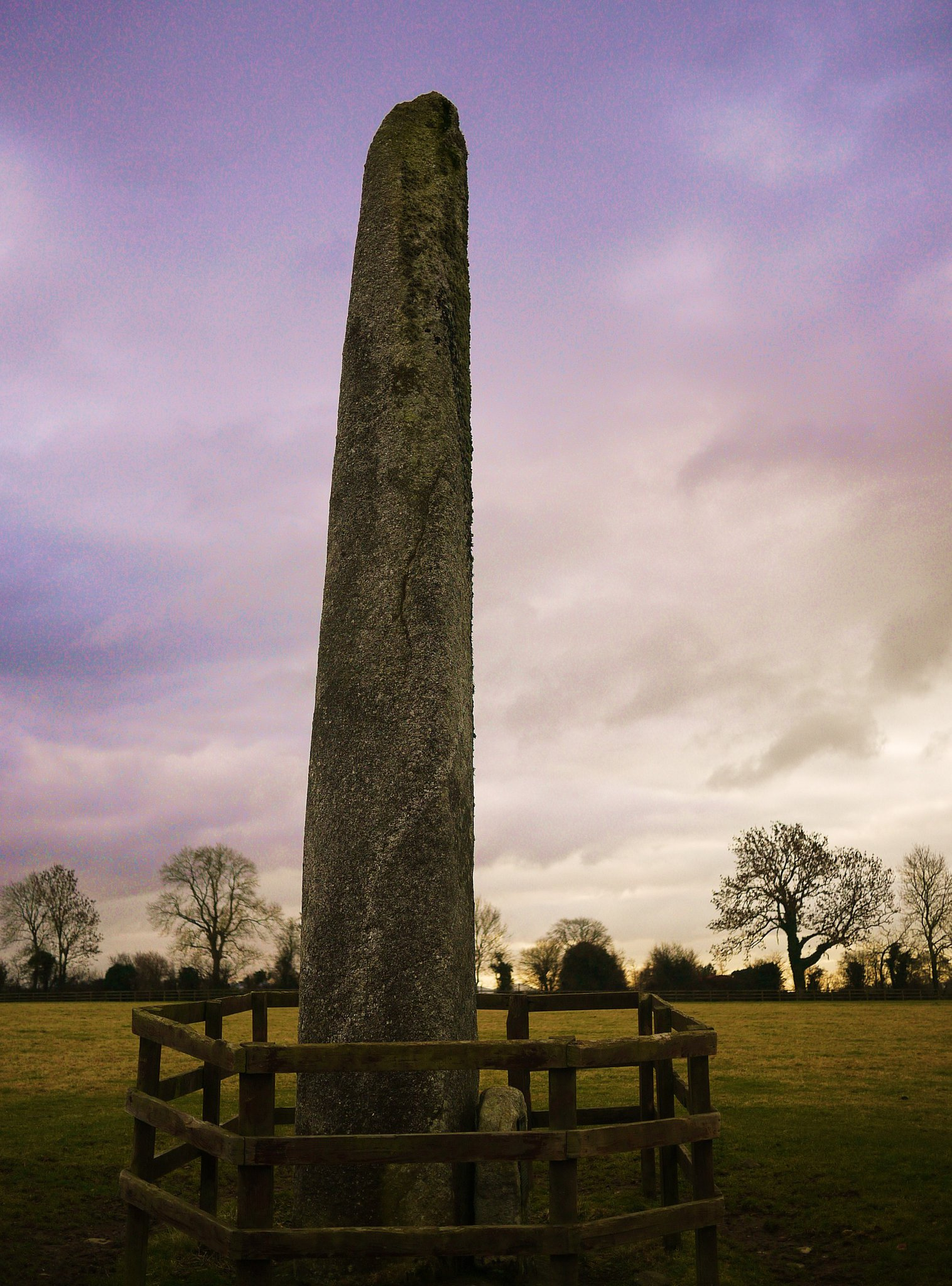
Punchestown Longstone, Ireland

Ireland is rich in menhirs, standing stones which are usually located in farmer's fields and are heavily worn due to poor weather conditions and exposure to livestock.

=== Italy ===
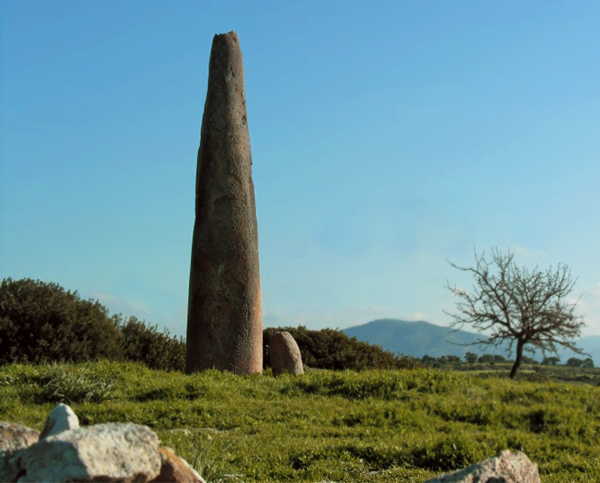
Menhir in Sardinia

Menhirs are especially common in Sardinia. It is possible to see at least 332 such standing stones on the island, including especially elaborate "statue-menhirs" that show a human face at the top and other gendered symbols on the flat front sides. Over a hundred examples of this standardized type have been found, most of them around the village of Laconi. In the Sardinian language they are known as perdas fittas or perdas lungas.

=== Norway ===
Bauta discoveries in Norway by county
County	Number
Akershus	8
Aust-Agder	56
Buskerud	7
Finnmark	3
Hedmark	5
Hordaland	70
Møre og Romsdal	134
Nord-Trøndelag	102
Nordland	90
Oppland	24
Oslo	0
Rogaland	258
Sogn og Fjordane	43
Sør-Trøndelag	66
Telemark	13
Troms	15
Vest-Agder	107
Vestfold	35
Østfold	140

Overall 1,176 menhirs are registered in Norway. The stones are often included as part of a tomb construction. The introduction to Snorre Sagas points out that it was the custom to "burn all dead and raise monoliths for them" and that this custom was maintained in Norway and Sweden for a long time. As a rule, each grave was marked with a single stone, but there were also instances where several stones were used, including the burial facility De fem dårlige jomfruer at Karmsundet in Rogaland, with five raised stones. It is especially prevalent in Østlandet to find several monoliths arranged in a circle. Sometimes standing stone monuments are unrelated to known graves. It may be that they served as boundary markers. These include several stones in Fana in Bergen Municipality that can be linked to an important historical boundary between Sunnhordland and Nordhordland, as it was in medieval times.

In Norway, standing stones usually dated to the Migration Period, the Viking Age or early Middle Ages.

=== Portugal ===
In Portugal, there are also found several ancient menhirs. The highest concentration is in the Alentejo region. These include the menhirs of Meada, the largest of the Iberian Peninsula, Outeiro, Patalou and Barrocal. Among these megalithic structures is the great Almendres Menhir within the Almendres Cromlech complex near Évora.

=== Scandinavia ===
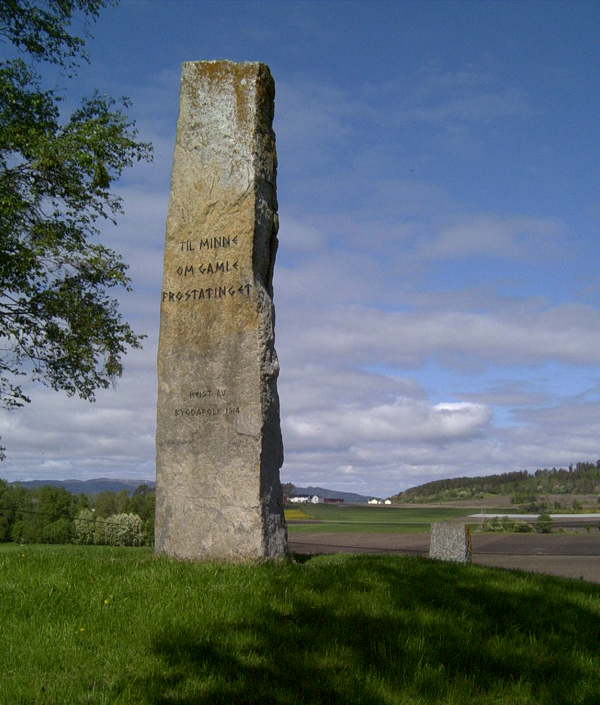
Frostatinget bautasten

In Scandinavia, menhirs are called bautasteiner or bautastenar and continued to be erected during the Pre-Roman Iron Age and later, usually over the ashes of the dead. They were raised both as solitary stones and in formations, such as the stone ships and few stone circles. Sometimes, they were raised only as commemoration to great people, a tradition which was continued as the runestones.

Frostating, with its seat at Tinghaugen in Frosta Municipality in Trøndelag county, was the site of an early Norwegian court. The site is represented by the Frostatinget bautasten.

The tradition was strongest in Bornholm, Gotland and Götaland and appears to have followed the Goths, during the 1st century, to the southern shore of the Baltic Sea, (now Northern Poland) where they are a characteristic of the Wielbark culture.

=== Scotland ===
Various menhirs have existed in Scotland. The Ravenswood standing stone is an extant one that is about 4000 years old.

=== Serbia ===
The graves of the "Latins" and the "Jidovs" near the village of Balwan (Bovan), north of Aleksinac in Serbia were marked by large boulders.

=== Slovakia ===
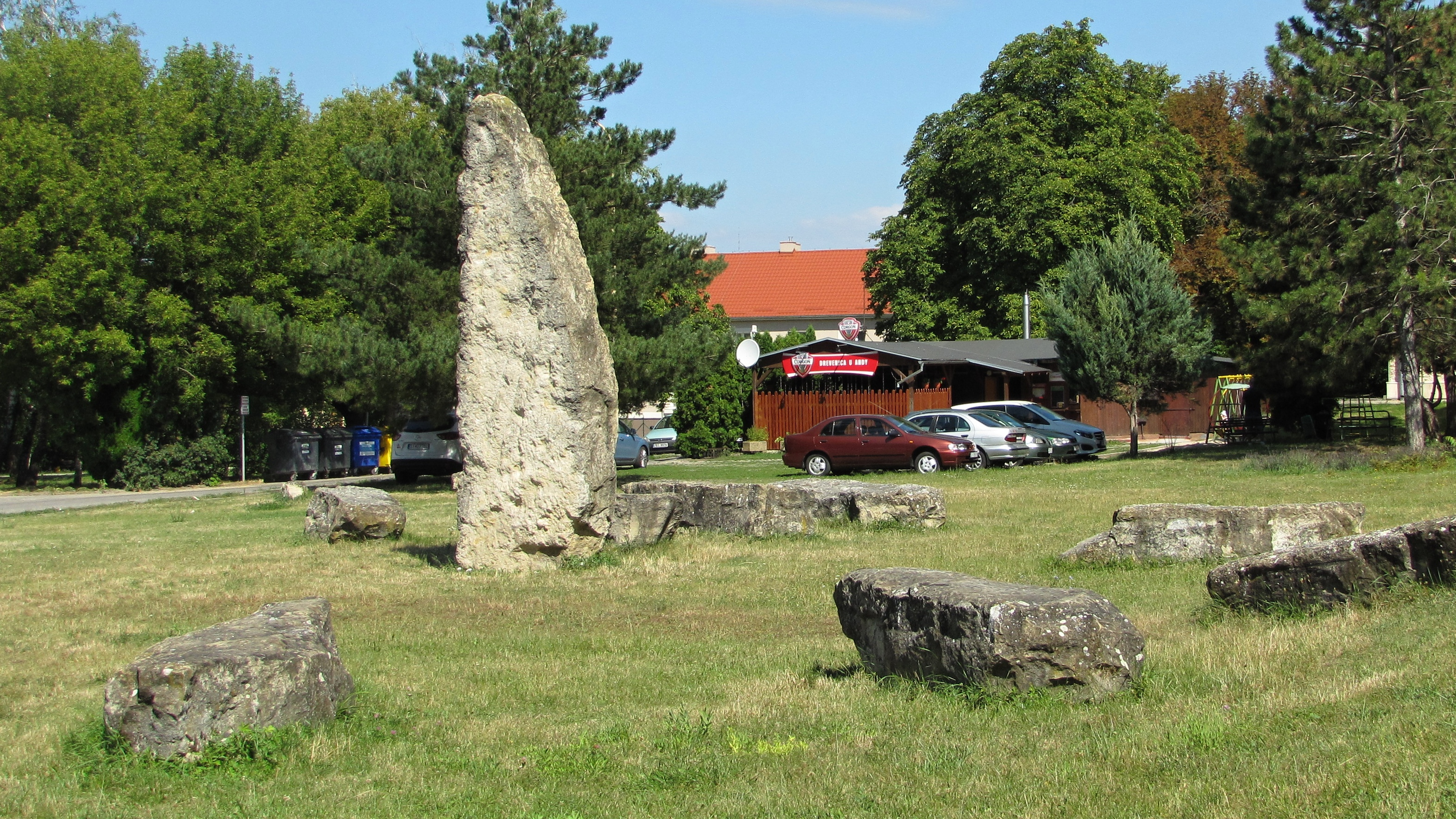
The Holíč Menhirs.

There are multiple menhirs that have or currently exist in Slovakia. The most known is the Holíč Menhir, a collection of menhirs that were found in 1988 during the construction of an NPP building.

=== Spain ===
In Spain, menhirs associated with the western European megalithic industry are relatively unusual compared to dolmens, but still are common sights in the northern half of the country, where at least 500 menhirs have been reported. They are particularly common in the Basque Country, Navarre, northern Burgos and Palencia, Cantabria, and the Pyrenees, where they are usually encountered standing alone or in small groups (cromlech) in elevated locations; the Arlobi menhir is one of the most recent examples of a menhir. In smaller numbers, but of great dimensions, some examples are located in Extremadura, very related to the menhirs of Portugal. Most of the menhirs in northern Spain appear to date back to the stone age; they are not usually associated with burials, but in at least one instance (the Menhir of Cuesta del Molino in Burgos) burials dating at least 2000 years after the menhir was originally built have been found.

In mediterranean Spain and, particularly the Balearic islands, megalithic structures consisting of standing stones such as the Taulas, but associated with Bronze Age and Iron Age cultures, are also common.

=== Sweden ===
In Sweden menhirs were erected as markers for the graves of warriors until the 13th century. The following lines are taken from Snorri Sturluson's introduction to his work Heimskringla:

As to funeral rites, the earliest age is called the Age of Burning; because all the dead were consumed by fire, and over their ashes were raised standing stones.

For men of consequence a mound should be raised to their memory, and for all other warriors who had been distinguished for manhood a standing stone; which custom remained long after Odin's time.

In the same work Snorri writes that the Swedes burned the corpse of their king Vanlade and raised a stone over his ashes by the River Skyt, one of the tributaries of the River Fyris:

The Swedes took his body and burned it at a river called Skytaa, where a standing stone was raised over him.

The tradition is also mentioned in the Hávamál.

=== Switzerland ===
In the French-speaking canton of Vaud in Switzerland, several menhirs form linear patterns in Yverdon-les-Bains. These are situated in Clendy and date back to the third millennium BC.

=== Wales ===
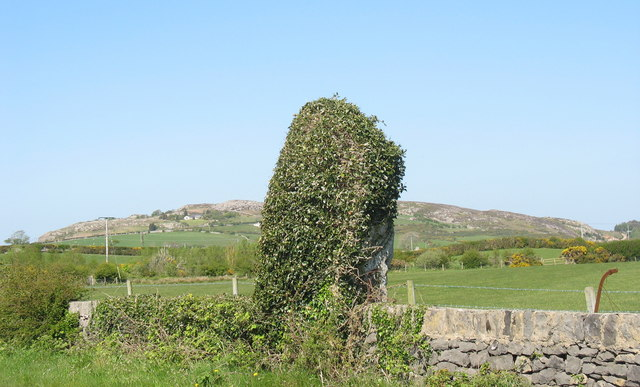
Maen Hir Maenaddwyn, Wales

In Welsh, menhirs are called 'Maen Hir' and they are scattered throughout Wales.

== South America ==
Menhirs were erected by the U'wa people of Colombia in their ancestral territory. They believe that the menhirs are the ancients of the U'wa clans who were turned into the stone piers of the world. Menhirs can be found in Chita and Chiscas, Boyacá.

There are 114 menhirs in the Provincial Park Los Menhires in Argentina. They were erected by the Tafí people, an indigenous culture of Tucumán province, and were used in fertility rites.

== See also ==
- List of dolmens
- List of individual rocks
