= Dolné Zahorany =

Village and municipality in Slovakia

Dolné Zahorany Magyarhegymeg
- Municipality
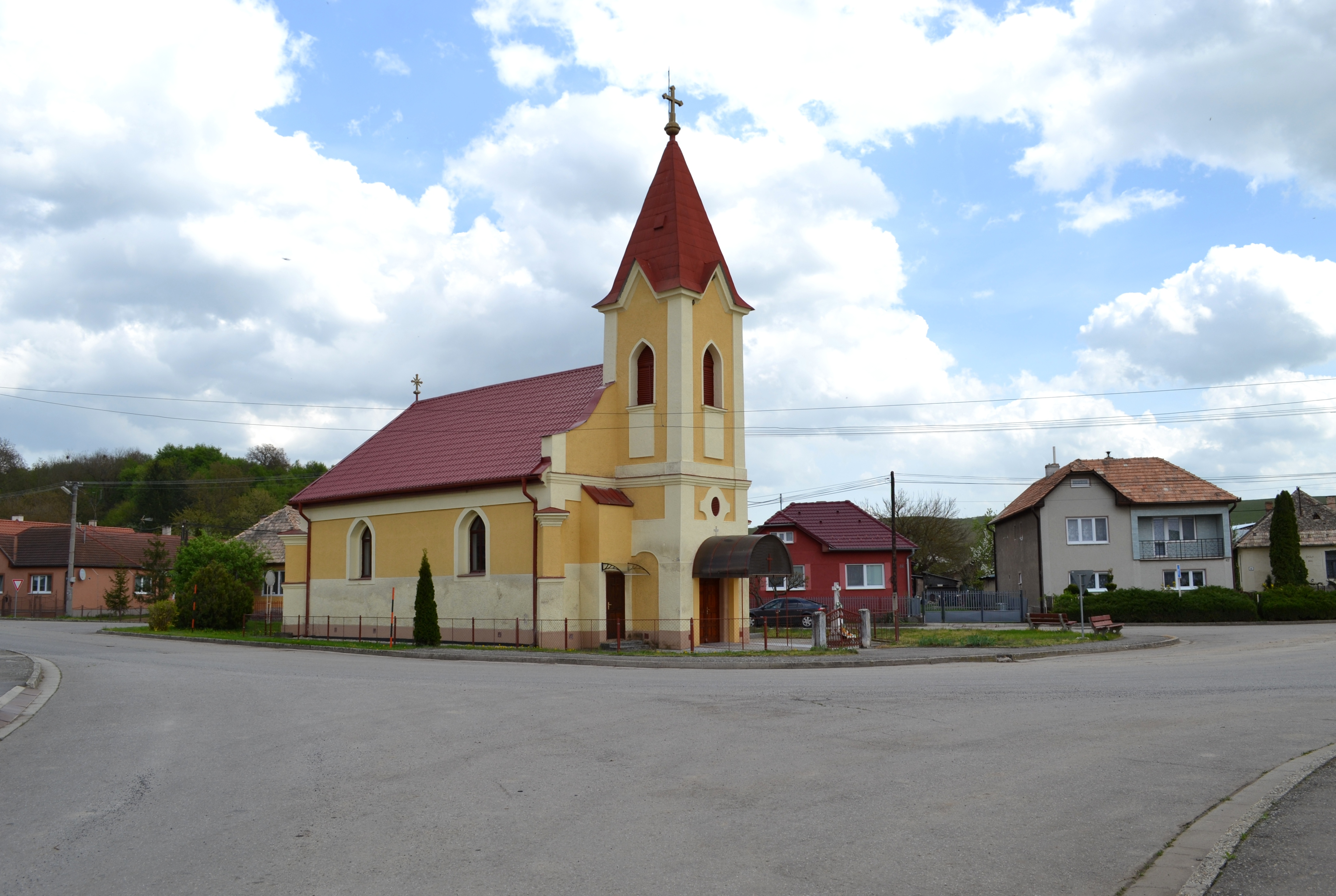
- Church of St. Michael the Archangel

- Flag

- Location of Dolné Zahorany in the Banská Bystrica Region Location of Dolné Zahorany in Slovakia
- Coordinates: 48.35°N 19.92°E
- Country: Slovakia
- Region: Banská Bystrica Region
- District: Rimavská Sobota District
- First mentioned: 1341

Area
  - Total: 6.38 km^{2} (2.46 sq mi)
- Elevation: 252 m (827 ft)

Population (2025)
  - Total: 174
- Time zone: UTC+1 (CET)
  - Summer (DST): UTC+2 (CEST)
- Postal code: 985 42
- Area code: +421 47
- Vehicle registration plate (until 2022): RS
- Website: dolnezahorany.sk

Dolné Zahorany (earlier: Maďarské Záhorany; Hungarian: Magyarhegymeg) is a village and municipality in the Rimavská Sobota District of the Banská Bystrica Region of Slovakia.

== Geography ==
The municipality lies at an altitude of 252 metres (827 ft) and covers an area of 6.38 km^{2} (2.46 sq mi) (2025).

== History ==
In historical records, the village was first mentioned in 1341 (1341 Hegmuky, Hegmeg, 1427 Hegymeg). Originally, it was situated between Padarovce and Lukovištia. In 1566 it was completely destroyed by the Turks and later rebuilt at the current location.

== Population ==
Population statistic (10 years)
Year	1995	2005	2015	2025
Count	217	209	185	174
Difference		−3.68%	−11.48%	−5.94%

Population statistic
Year	2024	2025
Count	175	174
Difference		−0.57%

It has a population of 174 people (31 December 2025).

=== Ethnicity ===
Census 2021 (1+ %)
Ethnicity	Number	Fraction
Hungarian	159	84.57%
Slovak	35	18.61%
Not found out	10	5.31%
Total	188	

In year 2021 was 188 people by ethnicity 159 as Hungarian, 35 as Slovak, 10 as Not found out, 1 as Ukrainian and 1 as Russian.

Note on population: The difference values of population numbers in the table "Population statistic" and in the sections "Ethnicity" & "Religion" is caused by the use of various statistical methods.

=== Religion ===
Census 2021 (1+ %)
Religion	Number	Fraction
Roman Catholic Church	168	89.36%
None	9	4.79%
Not found out	6	3.19%
Evangelical Church	2	1.06%
Total	188	

In year 2021 was 188 people by religion 168 from Roman Catholic Church, 9 from None, 6 from Not found out, 2 from Evangelical Church, 1 from Eastern Orthodox Church, 1 from Greek Catholic Church and 1 from Buddhism.

== Genealogical resources ==
The records for genealogical research are available at the state archive "Statny Archiv in Banska Bystrica, Slovakia"

- Roman Catholic church records (births/marriages/deaths): 1774–1873 (parish B)
- Lutheran church records (births/marriages/deaths): 1767–1883 (parish B)

== See also ==
- List of municipalities and towns in Slovakia
