= Ivan Krasko =

Czechoslovak politician

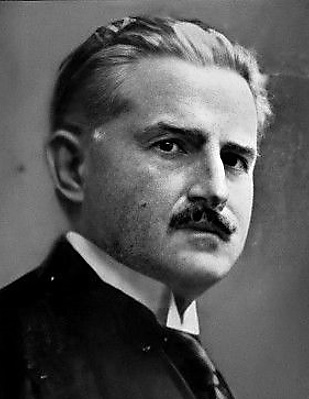
Ivan Krasko

Ivan Krasko (real name Ján Botto, pseudonyms Bohdana J. Potokinová, Ivan Krasko, Janko Cigáň, 12 July 1876 in Lukovištia (Lukovistye) – 3 March 1958 in Bratislava) was a Slovak poet, translator and representative of modernism in Slovakia.

== Biography ==
He was born into a peasant family in Lukovištia, a village in the Gemer (Gömör) region. He studied at the Hungarian grammar school in Rimavská Sobota (Rimaszombat), later at German grammar schools in Sibiu and Braşov, where he graduated. In 1900 he applied for the study of chemical engineering in Prague, where he successfully graduated in 1905. He was a member of the Slovak association Detvan. He worked then for some time as a chemist in the town of Klobuky, later in a chemical factory in Slaný. When the First World War broke out, he went to fight on the Eastern Front against the Russian Empire. After end of the war, he returned to Czechoslovakia and started working as a politician, becoming a member of parliament and a senator of the Agrarian Party. He mostly lived in Bratislava, but in 1943, he moved to Piešťany, where he lived until 1958. He died on 3 March 1958 in Bratislava, and is interred in Lukovištia.

There is a memorial room in Piešťany, opened in 1976, dedicated to his life and work. A street in Piešťany is named after him.

== Literary output ==
He started writing poems during his grammar school studies, but he published first of them only in 1896, called Pieseň nášho ľudu (app. Song of our folk). He published his works under pseudonym Janko Cigáň until second half of the 1900s, when he changed his poetical name to Ivan Krasko (Ivan = variant name of Ján and Krasko = after the village of Kraskovo). He has written some more works in the 1910s, but many of his first works were first published in the 1950s. The topics include: social inequality, Magyarisation of the Slovak nation, passivity of young generation and also his personal sadness.

He also wanted to write poetic composition about his experience from the World War I and protests against it, but only the introduction was published in 1929 under the name "Eli, Eli, lama sabachthani?" (a Hebrew/Aramaic New Testament quote that reads Bože môj, Bože môj, prečo si ma opustil? in Slovak and My God, my God, why hast thou forsaken me? in King James Version English).

== Works ==
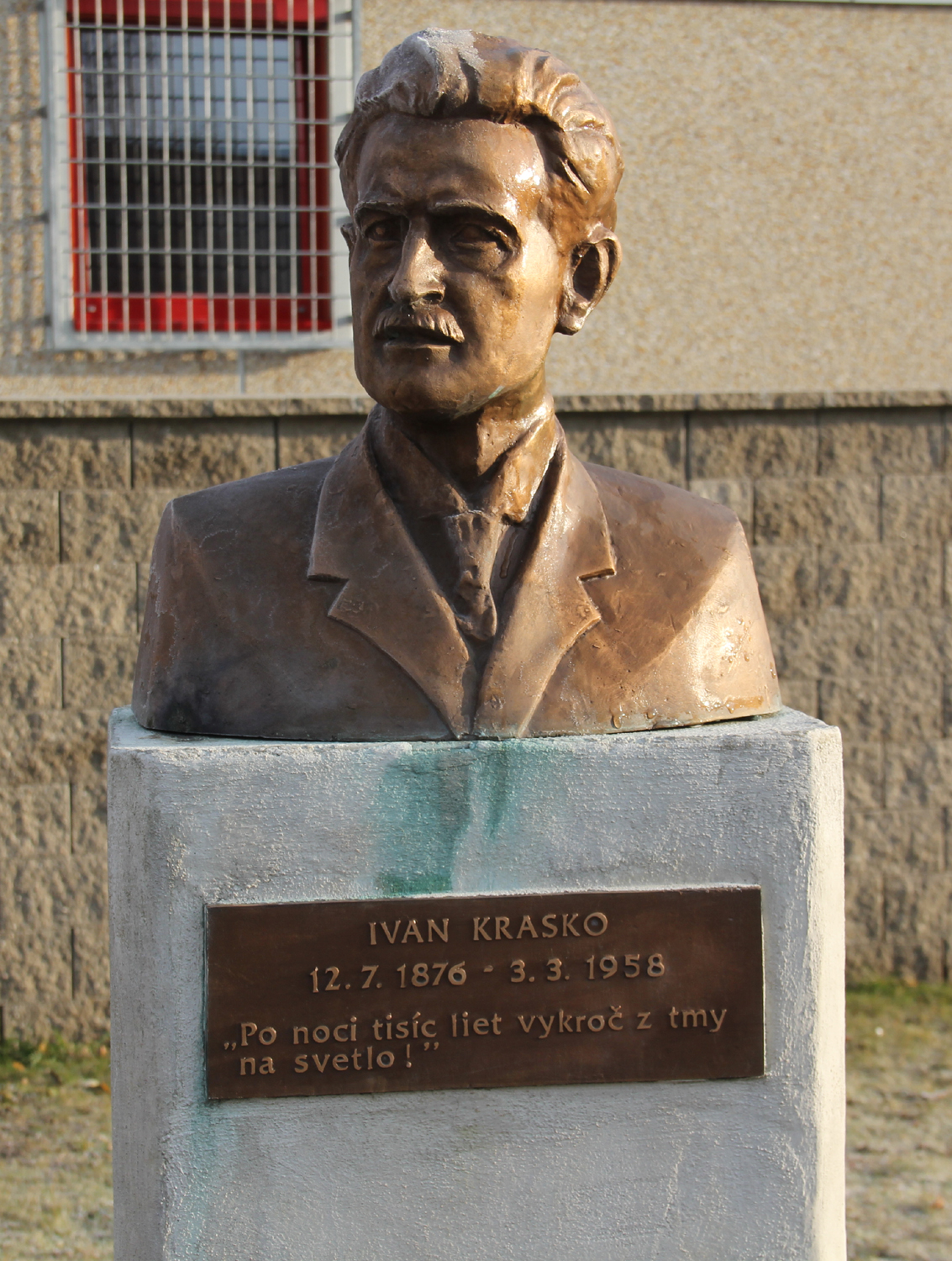
Bust of Ivan Krasko in Rimavská Sobota

The names in brackets indicate where the work was first published.

=== Poetry ===
- 1896 - Pieseň nášho ľudu, poem (Slovenské pohľady)
- 1902 - Deň spásy, poem (Slovenské pohľady)
- 1902 - Za búrnej čiernej noci, poem (Slovenské pohľady)
- 1905 / 1906 - Lístok, cycle of poems (Dennica)
- 1906 - List slečne Ľ. G., poem (Slovenské pohľady)
- 1906 - Jehovah, poem (Letopis Živeny)
- 1906 - Poznanie, poem (Slovenské pohľady)
- 1909 - Nox et solitudo (Latin for app. night and loneliness), the first collection of his poetry (introduction was written by Svetozár Hurban Vajanský)
- 1910 - Noc a Ja, poem in prose (Prúdy)
- 1912 - Verše, second collection of his poetry
- 1913 - Svätopluk, poem (Slovenský denník)
- 1952 - Moje piesne, collection of poems
- 1961 - Nad ránom..., selection from poetry

=== Prose ===
- 1907 - Naši, portrait study (Slovenský obzor)
- 1908 - Sentimentálne príhody I a II (later named Svadba a Almužna), short prose (Dennica)
- 1911 - List mŕtvemu (Slovenské pohľady)
- 1932 - Archanjel Michal, nástenná maľba v starobylom kostole na Kraskove, description of part of the fresco decoration (Slovenské pohľady)
- 1937 - Pôvod dedín Kraskova a Lukovíšť, study (Zborník Muzeálnej slovenskej spoločnosti)

=== Translations ===
- 1910 - Richard Dehmel: Vôľa k činu, theoretical essay (Prúdy)
- 1911 - Richard Dehmel: Príroda, symbol a umenie, theoretical essay (Slovenské pohľady)
- 1956 - Tiene na obraze času, collection of poems translated from the Romanian language

== Literature ==
- Krupa, Vladimír (2002). Ivan Krasko - pamätná izba básnika v Piešťanoch, sprievodca expozíciou. Balneological museum in Piešťany. ISBN 80-967038-6-2. Archived from the original on 2001-10-07. (Slovak)
- Barborica, Corneliu, ECOURII EMINESCIENE ÌN CREATIA POETULUI SLOVAC IVAN KRASKO(Romanian)
