= Menhir of Meada =

Phallic monolith in Portugal

- Menir da Meada
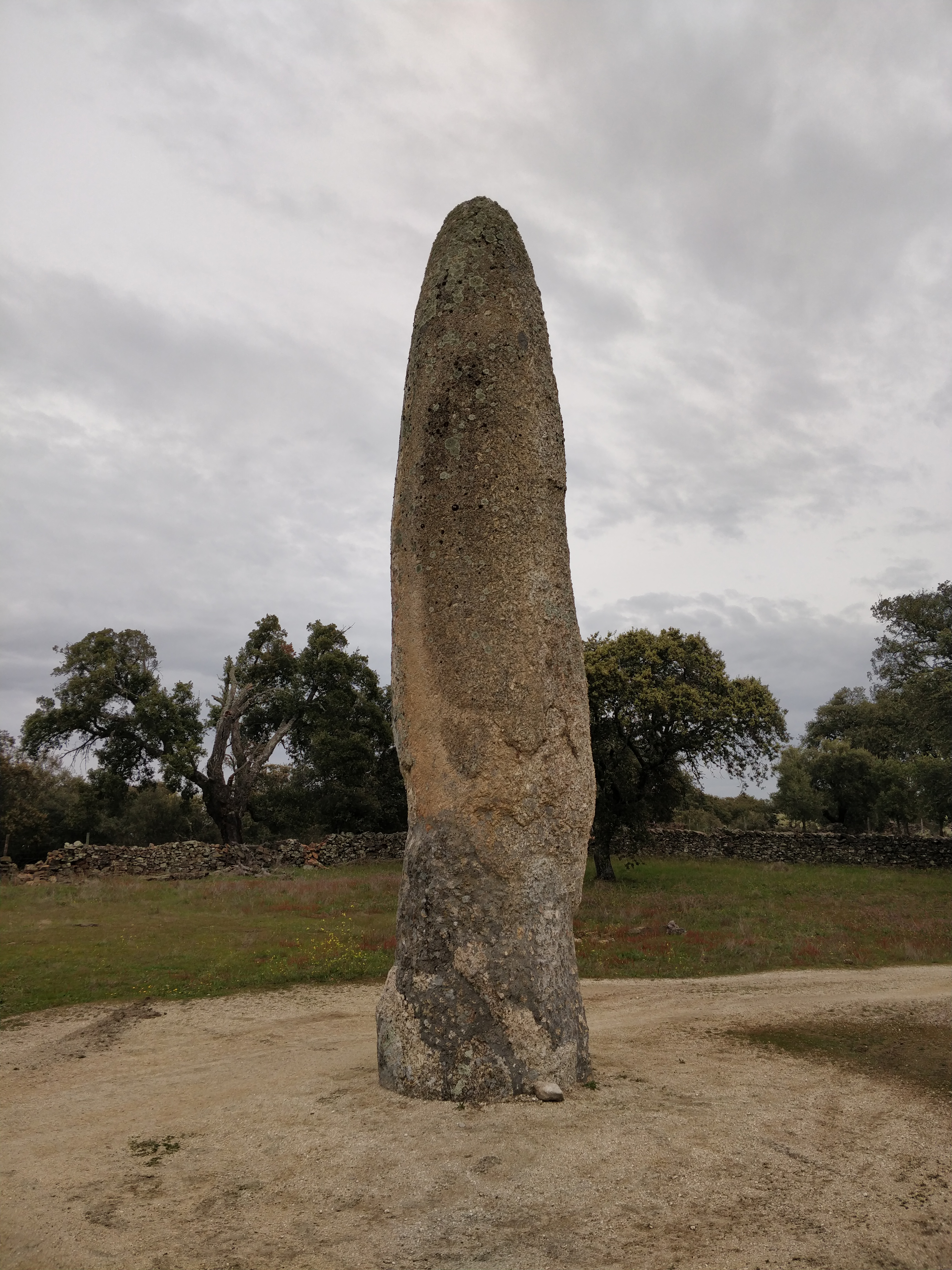
- Interactive map of Menhir of Meada
- 39°29′45.7″N 7°26′44.6″W
- Type: Phallic menhir
- Periods: Chalcolithic
- Location: Portalegre, Portugal

History
- Built: c. 5000 BC

Site notes
- Material: Stone
- Height: 7.5 m (25 ft)
- Diameter: 1.25 m (4 ft 1 in)
- Discovered: 1965
- Condition: Restored
- Owner: Portuguese Republic
- Public access: Yes

The Menhir of Meada is believed to be the largest menhir in the Iberian Peninsula that was entirely carved by humans. It is situated 12 km to the north of Castelo de Vide in the Portalegre District of Portugal and is within the protected area of the Serra de São Mamede Natural Park.

== Description ==
The monolith, consisting of coarse-grained porphyroid granite, was discovered in a rural area, now used mainly for cork production, in 1965. Discovered in two pieces, it was restored in the 1990s, when the two parts were joined and the complete stone was replaced in its original location. The menhir's total length is about 7.5 metres, with a maximum diameter of 1.25 metres and a circumference of 3.9 metres at the base. It weighs around 18 tons.

Based on radiocarbon dating of coals discovered underneath the base, the menhir is believed to have been raised around 5000 BCE, in the Neo-Chalcolithic period, approximately the same time as the Coureleiros dolmens, or megalithic tombs, that are found in the same district. If this dating is correct, it would make the menhir the oldest yet discovered anywhere in the world. The stone has a cylindrical configuration, with clear phallic contours, accentuated by a bump similar to a glans enveloping the top. The surface is likely to have been polished, and marks left by the tools used for polishing are visible.

== See also ==
- List of menhirs
