= Menhir of Patalou =

Phallic monolith in Portugal

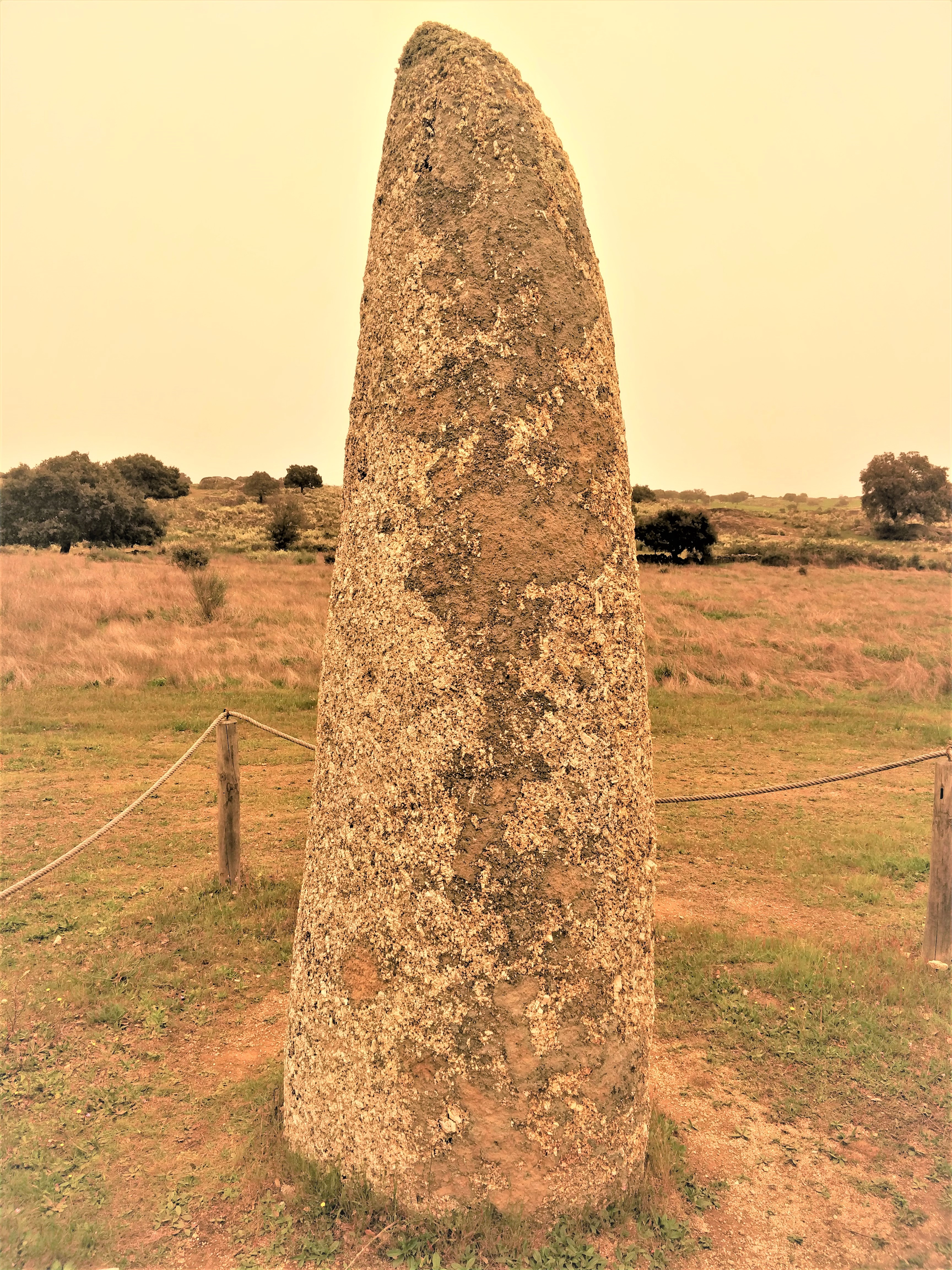
- Interactive map of Menhir of Patalou
- 39°28′57.9″N 7°35′38.1″W
- Type: Phallic megalith
- Periods: Chalcolithic
- Location: Nisa, Portalegre, Portugal

History
- Built: c. 4300 BC

Site notes
- Material: Granite
- Height: 4 m (13 ft)
- Diameter: 1.07 m (3.5 ft)
- Excavation dates: 2015
- Archaeologists: Jorge de Oliveira
- Discovered: 1990s by Joao Lopes
- Condition: Re-erected
- Public access: Yes

The Menhir of Patalou is located in the Nisa municipality in the Portalegre District of Portugal, about 5 km from the town of Nisa. The menhir is a megalithic standing stone dating back to the 5th millennium BCE. It is believed to be the second oldest example of a menhir to be identified in Western Europe.

== Description ==
The Menhir of Patalou is situated on a gentle east-facing slope, framed by two small hills. Having fallen over in the Chalcolithic era, it was re-erected in 2015, six meters north of its original location. The stone was carved out of granite and has phallic features. Its total height is 4 meters and the maximum diameter is 1.07 meters. The weight is close to 7 tons. At the top there are faint traces of an engraved decoration. It is believed that the stone's erection was associated with Neolithic fertility cults.

== Discovery and archaeological investigations ==
The menhir was found in the late 1990s by a hunter, João Francisco Lopes, when he was hunting in the Tapada da Bajanca, the name of the area where the stone was found. He reported his finding to the University of Évora, which confirmed that it was a menhir. However, funding constraints meant that no archaeological studies were conducted until 2015, when the MegaNisa project (Megalithism of Nisa) was implemented, with support from Nisa municipality. The excavation of the area, and subsequent re-erection of the stone, was carried out by a team led by Jorge de Oliveira of Évora University.

The site is close to the road that leads from Nisa to the Póvoa dam. Work was carried out in the summer of 2015 and indications were that the base had moved a little from the site where it was originally erected. The work began with the general cleaning of the surrounding land, followed by a geo-radar study of the area. This was followed by excavation near the monolith's base. Small fragments of pottery were discovered initially but it proved impossible to identify their original shape. Deeper down in the implantation area the researchers identified a piece of stone, measuring 32 cm long, 14 cm wide and 10 cm thick, which they concluded had been used to dig the base into which the menhir was implanted. In the base a small piece of charred wood was also identified and radiocarbon dating put that at between 6290 and 6185 BP. (Note: BP is "Before Present". In carbon dating the "Present" is considered to be 1950.) Also in the base were identified five small granite blocks that were probably placed there to support the menhir while it was being erected. The archaeologists concluded that the menhir fell during prehistory, given the difference in the state of conservation of the exposed and unexposed sides. It was also concluded that the menhir had been transported to the site, rather than carved from a stone found in the area.

As of March 2022, the menhir was awaiting classification as a national monument.

== See also ==
- List of menhirs
