= Valašské Klobouky =

- Town
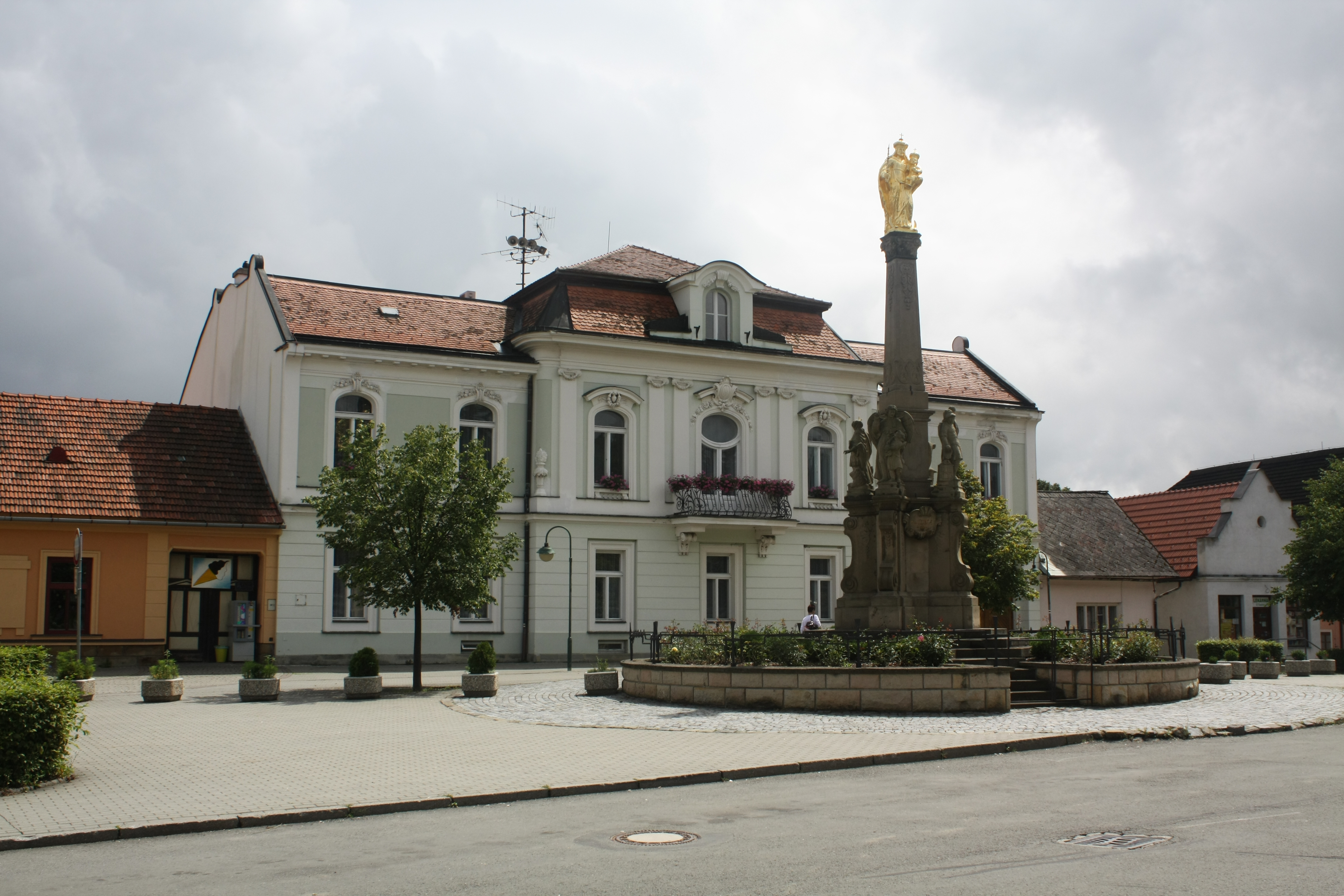
- Town square

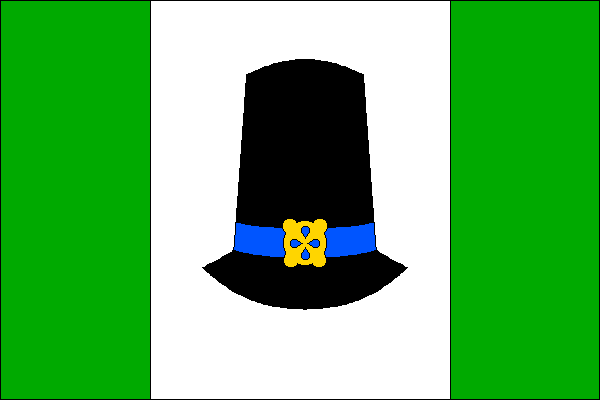
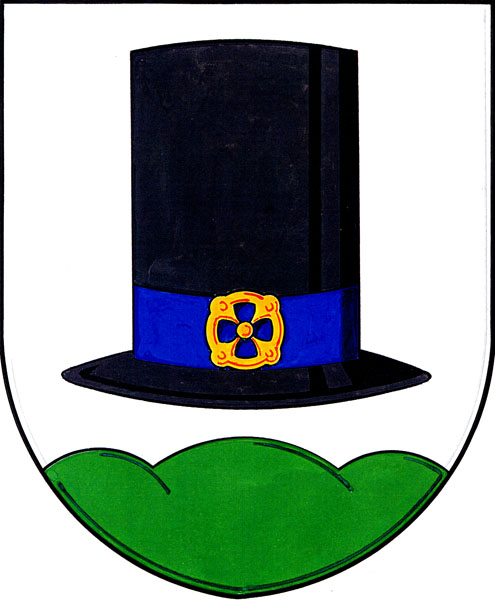
- Flag Coat of arms

- Location in the Czech Republic
- Coordinates: 49°8′26″N 18°0′27″E
- Country: Czech Republic
- Region: Zlín
- District: Zlín
- First mentioned: 1341

Government
  - Mayor: Josef Bělaška

Area
  - Total: 26.95 km^{2} (10.41 sq mi)
- Elevation: 405 m (1,329 ft)

Population (2026-01-01)
  - Total: 4,864
  - Density: 180.5/km^{2} (467.4/sq mi)
- Time zone: UTC+1 (CET)
  - Summer (DST): UTC+2 (CEST)
- Postal code: 766 17
- Website: www.valasskeklobouky.cz

Valašské Klobouky (Czech pronunciation: [ˈvalaʃskɛː ˈkloboukɪ]; German: Wallachisch Klobouk) is a town in Zlín District in the Zlín Region of the Czech Republic. It has about 4,900 inhabitants. The town is located in the valley of the Klobučka River, on the border between the White Carpathians mountain range and Vizovice Highlands. The historic town centre is well preserved and is protected as an urban monument zone.

== Administrative division ==
Valašské Klobouky consists of four municipal parts (in brackets population according to the 2021 census):

- Valašské Klobouky (4,084)
- Lipina (219)
- Mirošov (86)
- Smolina (318)

== Etymology ==
The name literally means 'Wallachian hats' in Czech.

== Geography ==
Valašské Klobouky is located about 25 kilometres (16 mi) southeast of Zlín. It lies on the border between the White Carpathians mountain range and Vizovice Highlands, within the northern tip of the Bílé Karpaty Protected Landscape Area. The highest point is the hill Stráně at 664 m (2,178 ft) above sea level. The town is situated in the valley of the Klobučka River.

== History ==
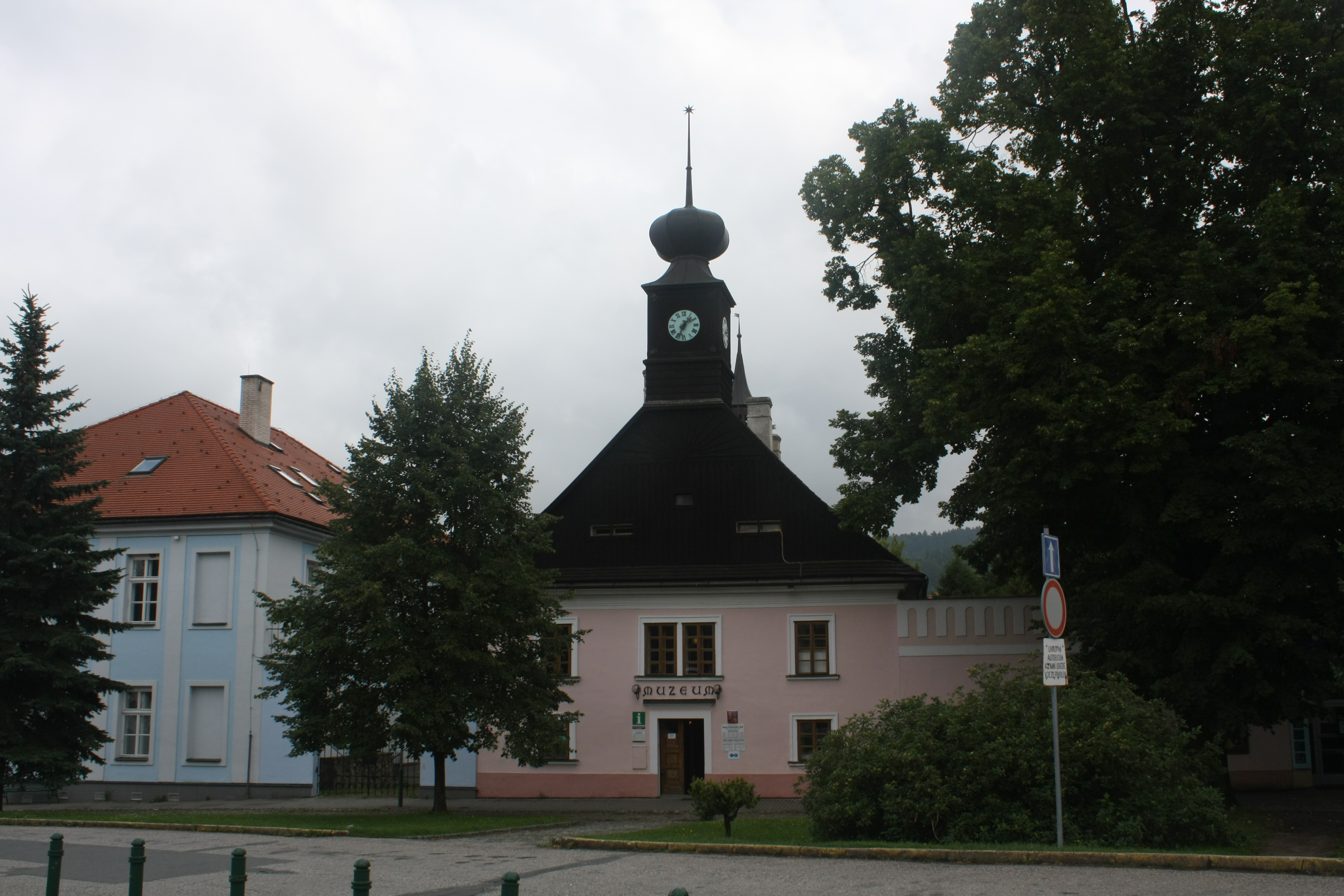
Old Town Hall, now a museum

The first written mention of Klobouky is from 1341. It was part of the Brumov estate. In the 14th and 15th centuries, it was an economic centre of the estate. The village was promoted to a market town in 1356 and to a town in the 16th century. In the 17th century, Vlachs colonised the area and the name of the town changed to Valašské Klobouky.

The village of Lipina was first mentioned in 1407. It was joined to Valašské Klobouky in 1976. Mirošov was first mentioned in 1460 and was joined to Valašské Klobouky in 1964. Smolina was first mentioned in 1503 and was joined to Valašské Klobouky in 1980.

== Demographics ==
Historical population

Year	Pop.	±%
1869	3,364	—
1880	3,509	+4.3%
1890	3,764	+7.3%
1900	3,689	−2.0%
1910	3,727	+1.0%

Year	Pop.	±%
1921	3,446	−7.5%
1930	3,364	−2.4%
1950	3,363	−0.0%
1961	4,026	+19.7%
1970	4,218	+4.8%

Year	Pop.	±%
1980	4,692	+11.2%
1991	5,028	+7.2%
2001	5,191	+3.2%
2011	4,911	−5.4%
2021	4,707	−4.2%

Source: Censuses

== Transport ==
Valašské Klobouky is located on the railway line Vsetín–Bylnice.

== Sights ==
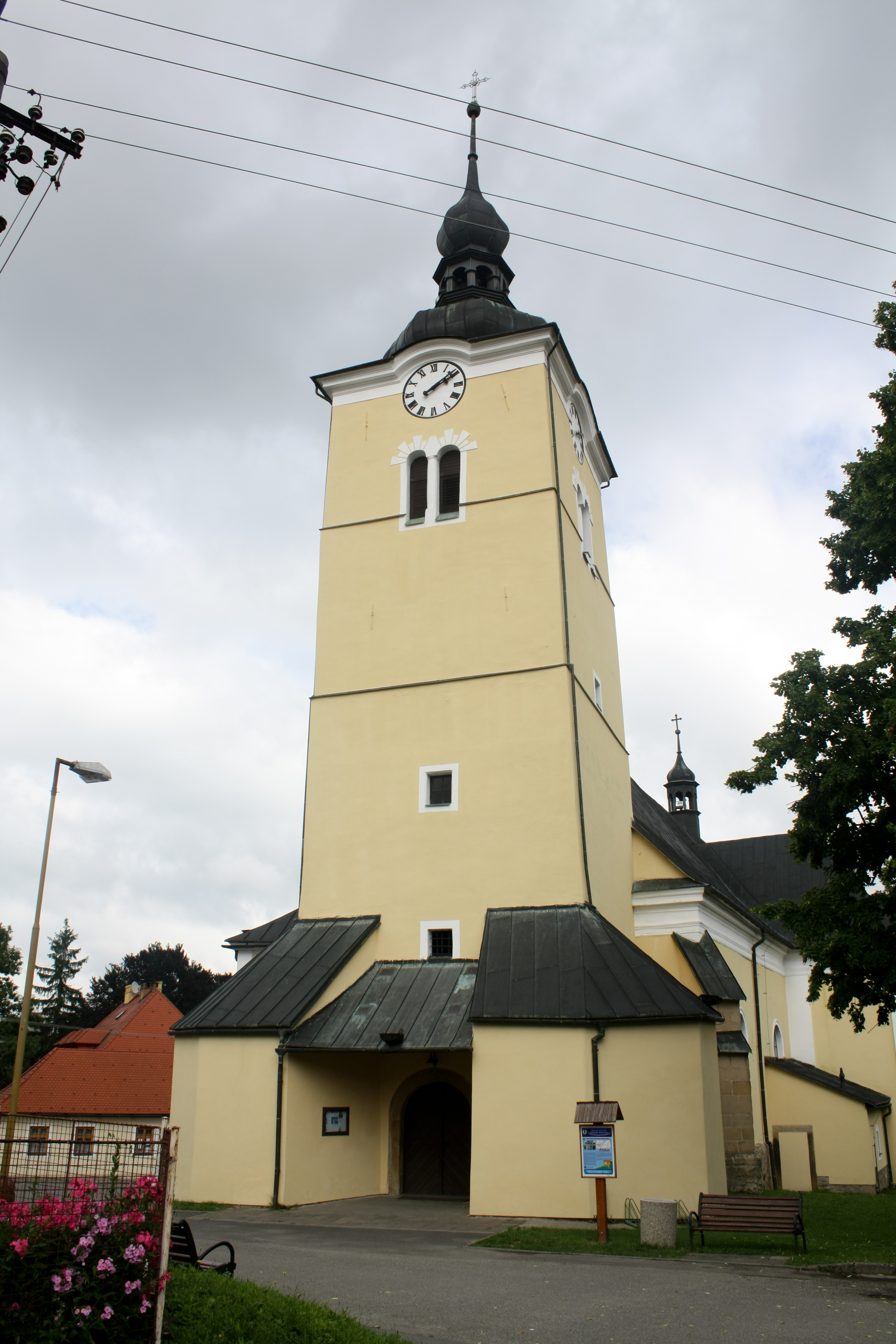
Church of the Exaltation of the Holy Cross

The Old Town Hall was first documented in 1567 and belongs to the most valuable buildings in the town. Today it houses the Town Museum. In front of the building is a historic pillory from the 16th century, one of the oldest preserved in the country. The second part of the museum's expositions is located in a historic house from 1781, the so-called Red House. It presents drapery, which is a traditional local craft.

The Church of the Exaltation of the Holy Cross was built in 1763. It has a Renaissance tower.

On the hill Královec is the eponymous wooden observation tower. It is 21.5 m (71 ft) high.

== Notable people ==
- Jan Matzal Troska (1881–1961), writer
- Josef Valčík (1914–1942), soldier and resistance fighter
- Ladislav Mňačko (1919–1994), Slovak writer and journalist
- Bedřich Havlíček (1922–1994), regional historian and ethnographer

== Twin towns – sister cities ==
Valašské Klobouky is twinned with:

- Zelów, Poland
