= Ladislav Mňačko =

Slovak writer and journalist (1919–1994)

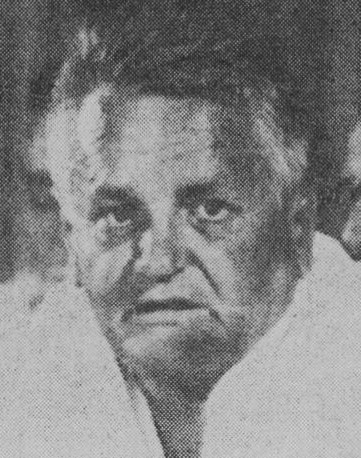
- Ladislav Mňačko in 1968
- Born: 28 January 1919; Valašské Klobouky, Czechoslovakia
- Died: 24 February 1994 (aged 75); Bratislava, Slovakia
- Resting place: Lukovištia, Slovakia
- Occupations: writer; journalist

Ladislav Mňačko (28 January 1919 – 24 February 1994) was a Czechoslovak writer and journalist.

Ladislav Mňačko was born in Valašské Klobouky. He was a member of the partisan movement in Slovakia during World War II. After the war, he was at first a staunch supporter of the Czechoslovak Socialist Republic and one of its most prominent journalists. However, after becoming disillusioned, he became a vocal critic of the regime, and as a consequence he was persecuted and censored. In the autumn of 1967, he went to Israel in protest against the official position of Czechoslovakia during the Six-Day War, but he returned soon afterwards.

After the invasion of Czechoslovakia by the Soviet-led Warsaw Pact in August 1968, he emigrated again, this time to Austria, where he lived for the next 21 years. In 1968 and 1969, he aided a number of Czechoslovak emigrants who came to Vienna. In January 1990, shortly after the Velvet Revolution, he returned to Czechoslovakia, but subsequent political developments and the growth of nationalism in the Slovak part of the federation disappointed him. After the dissolution of Czechoslovakia in 1992, which he strongly opposed, he moved to Prague. He died suddenly in Bratislava due to cardiac weakness during a short visit to Slovakia and was buried in Lukovištia.

Mňačko is one of the few Slovak writers of the 1950s and 1960s whose works were translated into English.

There is a permanent exhibition of the study and library of Ladislav Mňačko in Malá vila PNP, Pelléova 20/71, 160 00 Praha 6 – Bubeneč, almost identical to Mňačko's study in his Prague apartment.

== Works ==
- Smrť sa volá Engelchen (Death Is Called Engelchen), 1959. Translated into English by George Theiner in 1963. Filmed by Ján Kadár in 1963 .
- Oneskorené reportáže (Delayed Reportages), 1963.
- Ako chutí moc (The Taste of Power), 1967. Translated into English by Paul Stevenson in 1967.
- Siedma noc (The Seventh Night), 1968. Translated into English in 1969.
