= Holíč Menhir =

Menhir in Holíč, Slovakia

- Holíčska svätyňa (Slovak)
- Slovak Stonehenge
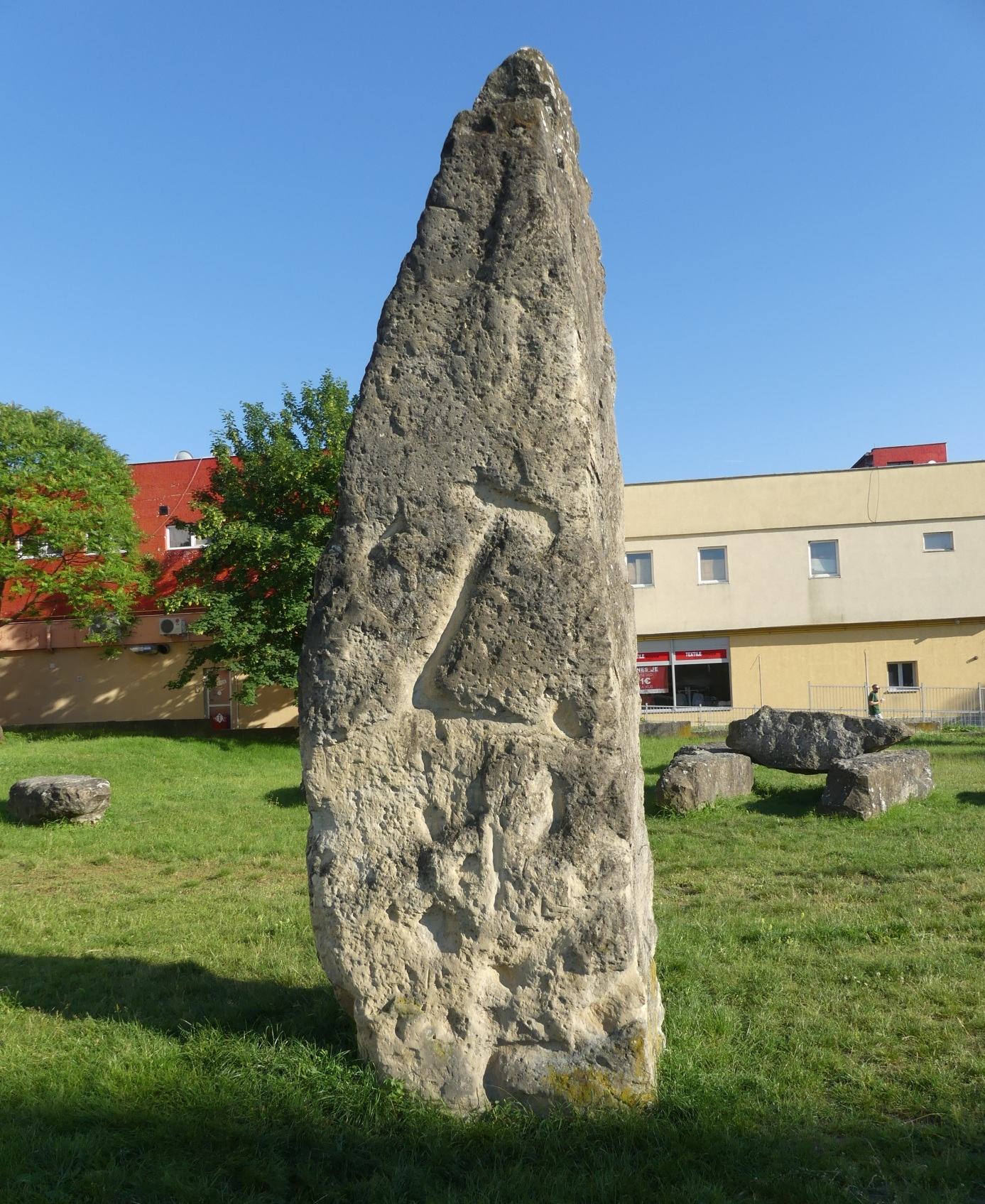
- The central stone of the menhir

- Location in Slovakia
- 48°48′32″N 17°09′41″E
- Location: Holíč, Skalica, Slovakia

Site notes
- Discovered: 1988

Holíč Menhir (Slovak: Holíčska svätyňa), also known as the Slovak Stonehenge, is an archaeological site of a group of menhirs located in the town of Holíč in Slovakia. The largest of the stones reaches up to 6.8 meters.

The menhirs were found on a hill in 1988 during the construction of the SNP settlement, where a prehistoric circular sanctuary (rondel) formed by two ditches was previously located. Such works in Central Europe are dated to approximately 4500–3500 BC. Only 22 stones have been preserved to this day, which are placed in the town centre. The other stones were taken to unknown locations, or have been included in the landscaping of the housing estate. Some are probably still in their original place.

The age of all the menhirs is estimated at about 5,500 years. According to Prof. Le Roux of the French Academy of Sciences, the drawings on the stones date back to the Iron Age at the latest, while the stone cut structure itself is much older.

The Holíč Menhir is considered a rarity of its kind in Slovakia.

== History ==
=== Discovery ===
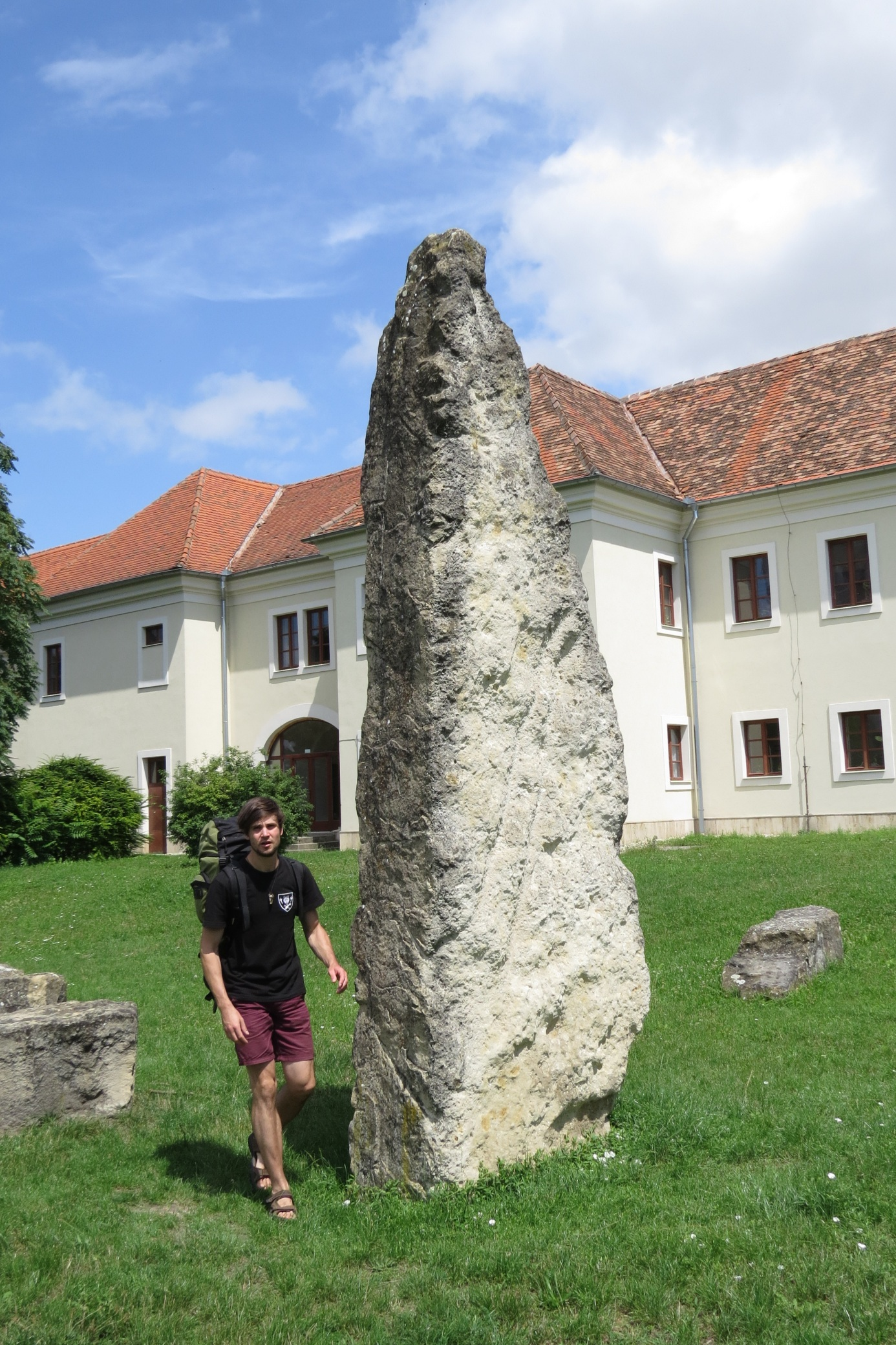
Size of the central menhir next to a person.

In 1988, the remains of a menhir were discovered, which were dug up around the edge of the park during the construction of the SNP housing estate in the area below Kalvária. The Holíč menhirs consisted of nine stones, which were located on areas sunk below ground level and were surrounded by deep circular ditches. The complex of the nine stones was surrounded by one circular ditch. There were 21 stones and they measured up to 6.8 m in height. They were arranged in two circles, in the center of which was the largest stone, currently the central stone in the lapidary. The larger circle with 12 stones had a diameter of 23 meters. There were 8 stones in the smaller circle. Some of the stones were decorated with images of tools and mythological scenes.

In 1996, the Menhir was placed in between the park of the administrative building of the City Office and the Elementary School of Art in Holíč.

=== Recent years ===
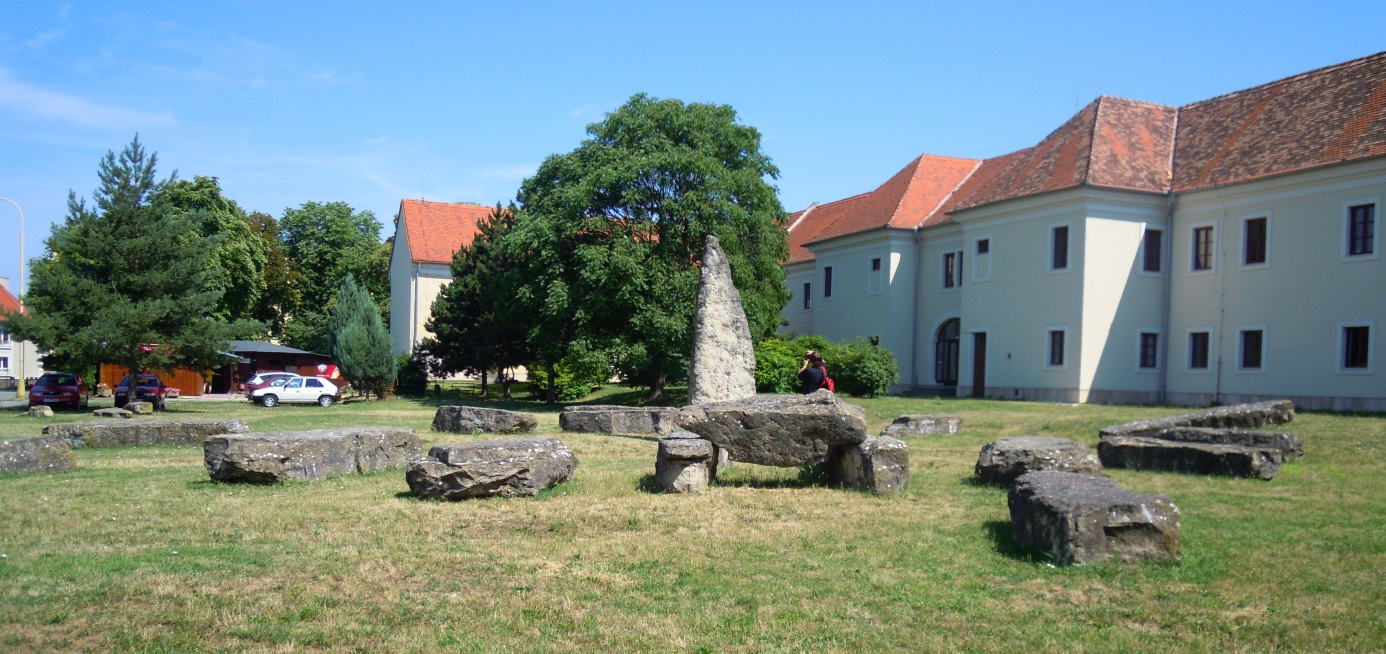
All of the menhirs.

In May 2004, the site was visited by a prominent French specialist in prehistory and megalithic monuments, Charles-Tanguy Le Roux, at the invitation of the Ministry of Foreign Affairs of the Slovak Republic and the French Embassy in Slovakia, who confirmed the authenticity and age of the Holíč Menhir, estimating that they were 5,500 years old.

== See also ==
- List of menhirs
