= Bedřich Havlíček =

Czech historian

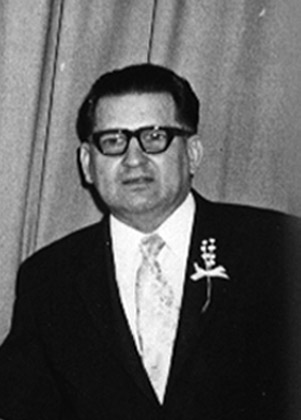
- Born: 6 October 1922; Valašské Klobouky, Czechoslovakia
- Died: 16 January 1994 (aged 71); Český Těšín, Czech Republic
- Education: Masaryk University
- Occupations: Teacher, regional historian
- Spouse: Vlasta (1923–1997)
- Children: Aleš, Libor

Bedřich Havlíček (Czech pronunciation: [ˈbedr̝ich ˈɦavliːtʃɛk]; 6 October 1922 – 16 January 1994) was a Czech regional historian and ethnographer. He worked as a high school teacher and homeland worker.

== Life ==
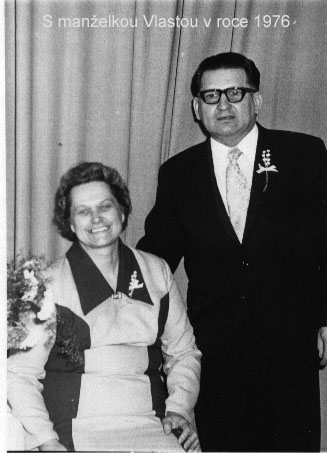
Havlíček with his wife

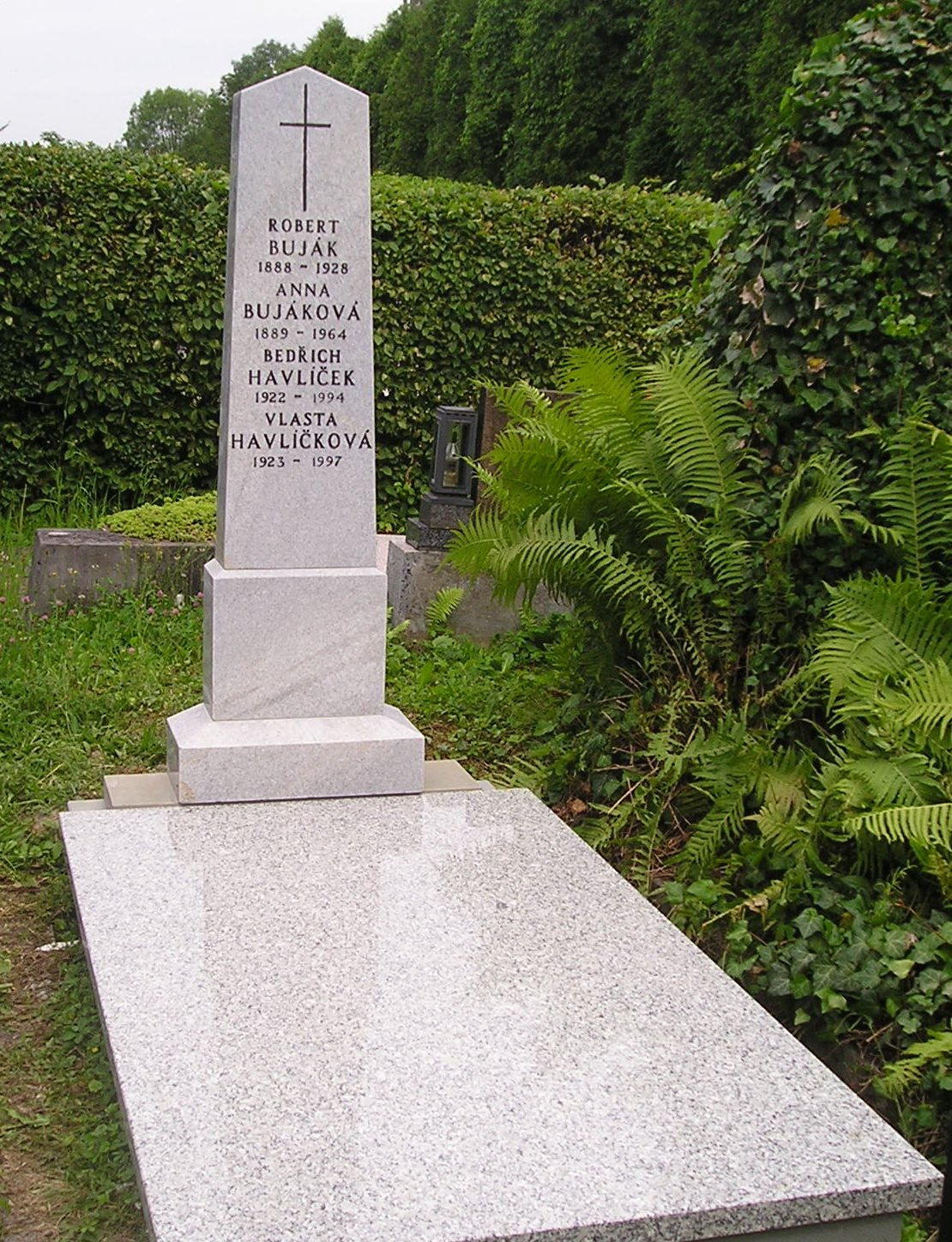
Grave of Havlíček in Český Těšín

Havlíček was born on 6 October 1922 in Valašské Klobouky. He was born as the eldest son of Frederick Havlíček and Frances, née Bařinková, in a glazier's family which had deep roots in southern Moravian Wallachia. He had two brothers, Ladislav and Zdeněk. In 1941, he graduated from a high school in Vsetín. He intended to study in university, but the Protectorate occupational regime excluded such an opportunity. For a short time, he attended a private business school in Veverská Bítýška due to forced labour order. In 1942–1944, he worked as a surveyor for an Institute in Prague. After war, he enrolled at the Faculty of Arts, where in 1948, he graduated in History and Geography subjects as a school teacher. During his studies, he also attended lectures on museology and ethnography lectures. Especially relationship with prof. Václavík motivated his interest in respective subjects for his entire life.

During his high school studies, he was focused on the Moravian Wallachia history, but only after liberation he could fully unfold this interest. His career as a teacher started on Business academy in Český Těšín, which was from other offered locations closest to Moravian Wallachia where he was born. He was inspired by culture, local traditions, and life style of northern part of Moravia. He gathered and documented a lot of genuine knowledge from witnesses and this formed a major part of his ethnographic and historical documentation.

Thematically Bedřich Havlíček covered local history of drapery, the history of labour movement in Moravian Wallachia and consequences of labour crisis in glass manufacturing in 1930. He also covered the "pulčínské" legends and the history of Brumov-Bylnice castle and also local development of Haluzice village including traditions of folk embroidery, an antifascist movement and significant parts of Moravian Wallachia development in the Middle Ages and recent history. All his findings and conclusions were published in Anniversary publication about VK (1956), in news OM VK (1958–1959), and in the book Vlachovice history (1988).

In later years, he focused primarily on Těšín, were the subject of his interest was an economical development of the district of Karvina (1965), mining workers struggles during industrial revolution (in 1968), past and present situation in Český Těšín (1970), the history of some Český Těšín region municipalities including monuments and sights, folk architecture and celebrations in Dolní Lomná, which were edited by Bedřich Havlíček since 1969. The magazine Těšínsko published around 70 reports on literature, obituaries and jubilee memories of celebrities and cultural anniversaries. During his lifelong presence on Business academy in Český Těšín, he prepared several generations of graduates for the economic profession, he initiated Těšínsko magazine (from 1957) to be published and worked as its editor; he founded the Museum reports OVM CT, significantly contributed to the cultural activity in the town of Těšín. He anonymously participated on monograph publication Český Těšín 1920–1970, due to the fact that he was not allowed to publish at the time of normalization period.

His younger son Libor continued his father's legacy and published a four part "Chapters to the History of Wallachia".

== Bibliography ==
- A clear overview of the historical development of the Wallachian region in the period of feudalism and capitalism. In: Jubilee Reader about VK. 1956, 55–72;
- From the History of Soukenic and Papuer Production in VK. In: JČ o VK, 76–89.
- Castle Brumov in the History of our Region, I. In: Vlastivědné kapitoly z VK, 1, 1959, 4–11.
- From the Battle Traditions of our People at the University of Economics in 1939–1945. In: Vlastivědné kapitoly z VK, 2, 1959, 1–6.
- Materials for ethnography, folklore and workers' movement in southern Wallachia. In: MM VK 1964.
- Haluzice 1768 - 1968. From the history and memory of the village. Haluzice 1968.
- The past and the presence of CT in the main outlines. In: T4, 1970, 1–7.
- Chapters from the history of the village of Komorní Lhotka. In: T 4, 1978, 9–17.
- Traditions of ethnographic research and ethnographic festivities in Jablunkov and the valley of the river Lomná. In: Study T 14, 1989, 205–214.
