= Padarovce =

Municipality of Slovakia

Padarovce Pádár
- Municipality
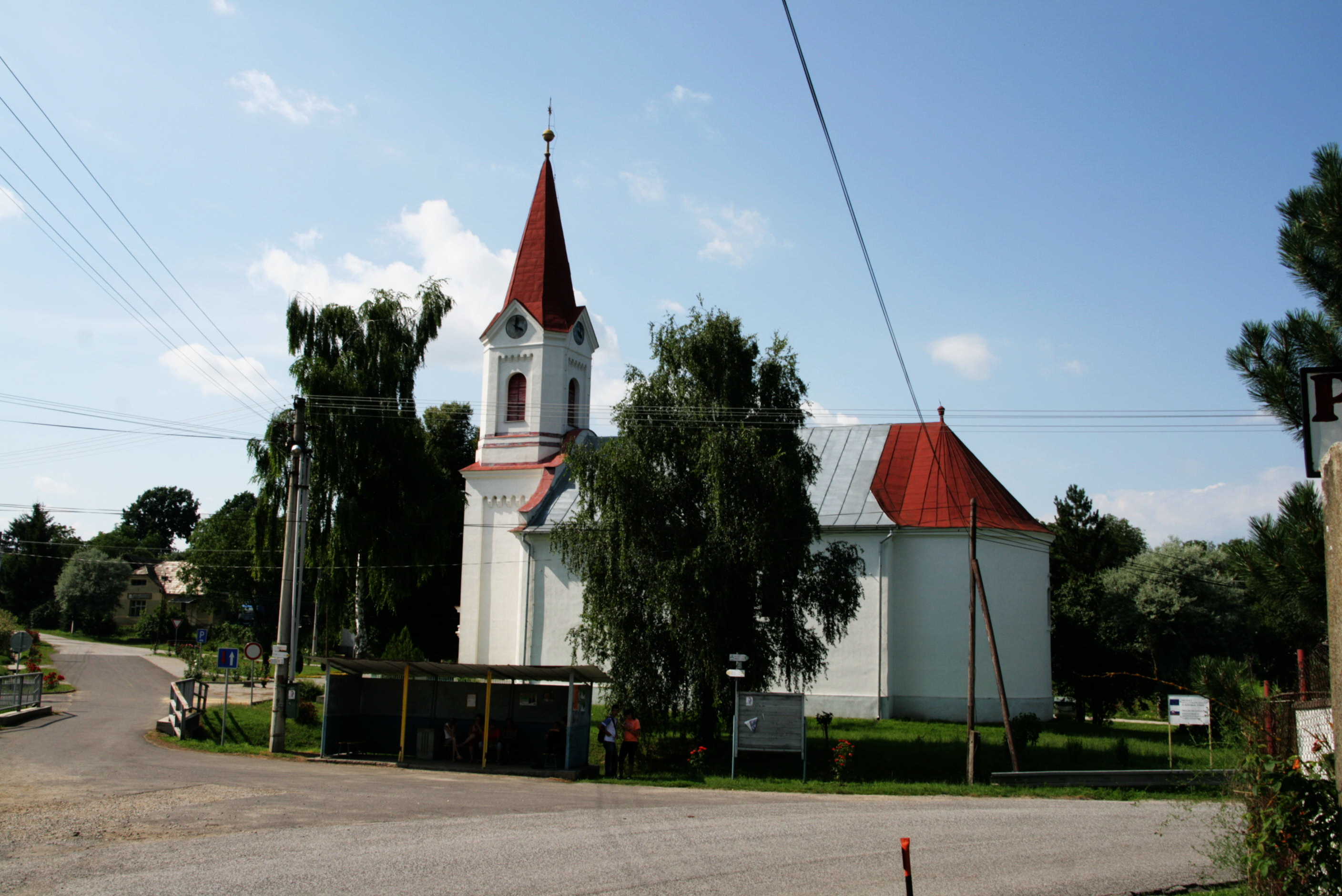
- Protestant church

- Flag

- Location of Padarovce in the Banská Bystrica Region Location of Padarovce in Slovakia
- Coordinates: 48.47°N 20.07°E
- Country: Slovakia
- Region: Banská Bystrica Region
- District: Rimavská Sobota District
- First mentioned: 1407

Area
  - Total: 12.11 km^{2} (4.68 sq mi)
- Elevation: 231 m (758 ft)

Population (2025)
  - Total: 137
- Time zone: UTC+1 (CET)
  - Summer (DST): UTC+2 (CEST)
- Postal code: 980 23
- Area code: +421 47
- Vehicle registration plate (until 2022): RS
- Website: www.padarovce.sk

Padarovce (Hungarian: Pádár, also Balogpádár) is a village and municipality in the Rimavská Sobota District of the Banská Bystrica Region of southern Slovakia.

== Geography ==
The municipality lies at an altitude of 231 metres (758 ft) and covers an area of 12.11 km^{2} (4.68 sq mi) (2025).

== Population ==
Population statistic (10 years)
Year	1995	2005	2015	2025
Count	182	158	195	137
Difference		−13.18%	+23.41%	−29.74%

Population statistic
Year	2024	2025
Count	140	137
Difference		−2.14%

It has a population of 137 people (31 December 2025).

=== Ethnicity ===
Census 2021 (1+ %)
Ethnicity	Number	Fraction
Slovak	102	68.45%
Hungarian	51	34.22%
Not found out	4	2.68%
Total	149	

In year 2021 was 149 people by ethnicity 102 as Slovak, 51 as Hungarian, 4 as Not found out, 1 as Rusyn and 1 as Polish.

Note on population: The difference values of population numbers in the table "Population statistic" and in the sections "Ethnicity" & "Religion" is caused by the use of various statistical methods.

=== Religion ===
Census 2021 (1+ %)
Religion	Number	Fraction
None	60	40.27%
Evangelical Church	44	29.53%
Roman Catholic Church	33	22.15%
Calvinist Church	6	4.03%
Not found out	3	2.01%
Total	149	

In year 2021 was 149 people by religion 60 from None, 44 from Evangelical Church, 33 from Roman Catholic Church, 6 from Calvinist Church, 3 from Not found out, 1 from Jehovah's Witnesses, 1 from Christian Congregations in Slovakia and 1 from United Methodist Church.
