= Slovenské pohľady =

Slovenské pohľady or Slovak views was a literary magazine published in 1846, 1847, 1851 and 1852. It was relaunched in 1881, and has been published continuously to the present.

Slovenske PohIady was the first Slovak literary magazine. Its founder, publisher and editor in chief was Jozef Miloslav Hurban and the magazine appeared in the period 1846-47 and from 1851–52 and was successful in popularization of social sciences and arts. The magazine folded due to harsh new press laws introduced under the absolutism of the Bachovský Government.

In its more recent manifestation the journal has continued from 1881, through the communist era till modern times.
