= Lukovištia =

Lukovištia Kőhegy
- Municipality
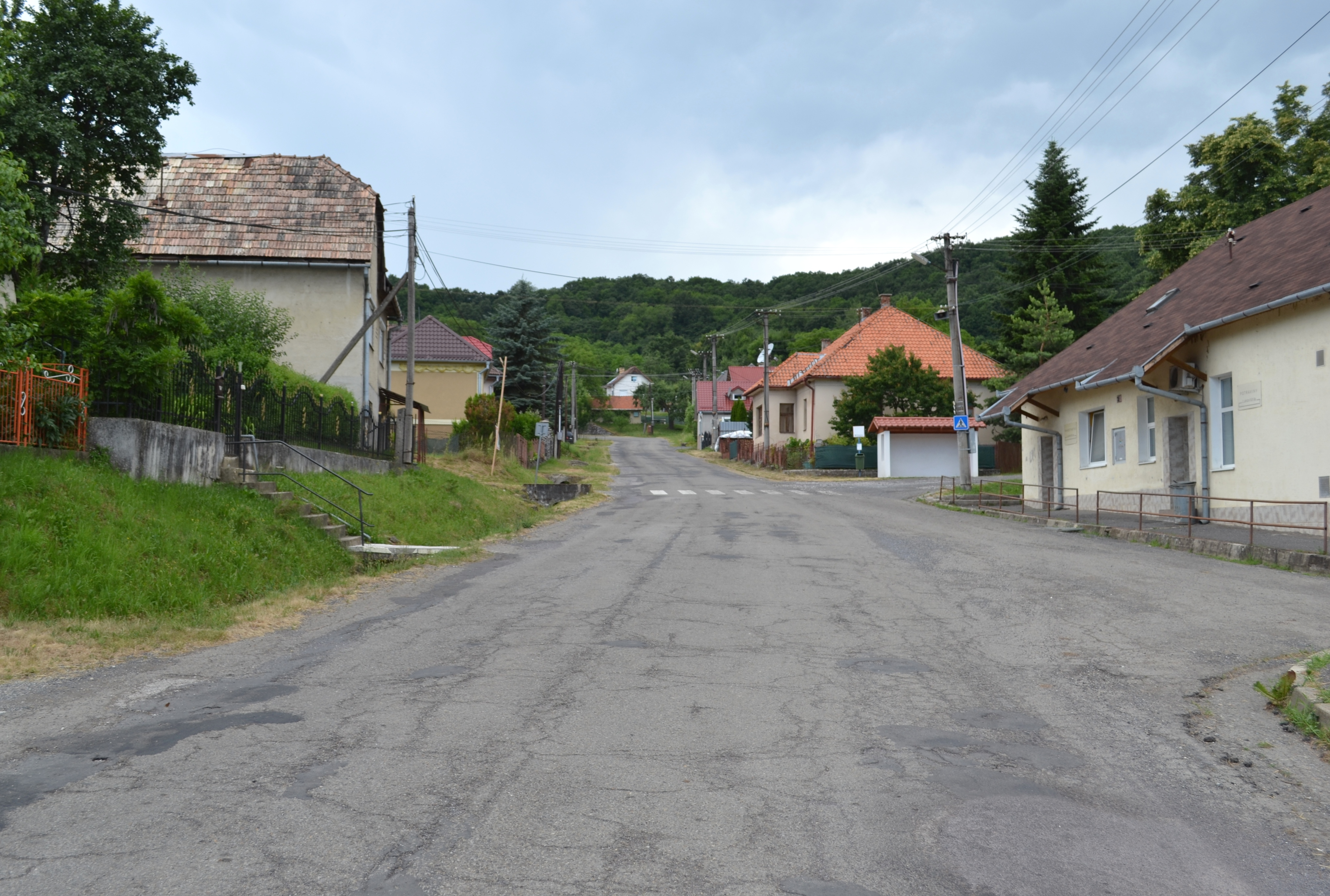

- Flag

- Location of Lukovištia in the Banská Bystrica Region Location of Lukovištia in Slovakia
- Coordinates: 48.48°N 20.03°E
- Country: Slovakia
- Region: Banská Bystrica Region
- District: Rimavská Sobota District
- First mentioned: 1407

Area
  - Total: 14.29 km^{2} (5.52 sq mi)
- Elevation: 361 m (1,184 ft)

Population (2025)
  - Total: 195
- Time zone: UTC+1 (CET)
  - Summer (DST): UTC+2 (CEST)
- Postal code: 980 26
- Area code: +421 47
- Vehicle registration plate (until 2022): RS
- Website: www.lukovistia.sk

Lukovištia (Hungarian: Kőhegy) is a village and municipality in the Rimavská Sobota District of the Banská Bystrica Region of southern Slovakia. The village is the birthplace of Slovak writer Ivan Krasko. The house where he was born in is now a small museum. In Lukovištia there is a baroque church with a painted ceiling from 1794.

== Geography ==
The municipality lies at an altitude of 361 metres (1,184 ft) and covers an area of 14.29 km^{2} (5.52 sq mi) (2025).

== Population ==
Population statistic (10 years)
| Year | 1995 | 2005 | 2015 | 2025 |
|---|---|---|---|---|
| Count | 219 | 196 | 196 | 195 |
| Difference | | −10.50% | +0% | −0.51% |

Population statistic
| Year | 2024 | 2025 |
|---|---|---|
| Count | 197 | 195 |
| Difference | | −1.01% |

It has a population of 195 people (31 December 2025).

=== Ethnicity ===
Census 2021 (1+ %)
| Ethnicity | Number | Fraction |
|---|---|---|
| Slovak | 151 | 92.63% |
| Not found out | 6 | 3.68% |
| Hungarian | 4 | 2.45% |
| Czech | 3 | 1.84% |
| Total | 163 | |

In year 2021 was 163 people by ethnicity 151 as Slovak, 6 as Not found out, 4 as Hungarian, 3 as Czech, 1 as Romani and 1 as Other.

Note on population: The difference values of population numbers in the table "Population statistic" and in the sections "Ethnicity" & "Religion" is caused by the use of various statistical methods.

=== Religion ===
Census 2021 (1+ %)
| Religion | Number | Fraction |
|---|---|---|
| None | 69 | 42.33% |
| Roman Catholic Church | 61 | 37.42% |
| Evangelical Church | 25 | 15.34% |
| Not found out | 5 | 3.07% |
| Total | 163 | |

In year 2021 was 163 people by religion 69 from None, 61 from Roman Catholic Church, 25 from Evangelical Church, 5 from Not found out, 1 from Christian Congregations in Slovakia, 1 from Other and 1 from Ad hoc movements.

== Notable personalities ==
- Ivan Krasko, poet
- Ladislav Mňačko, writer
