= Klobuky =

- Municipality
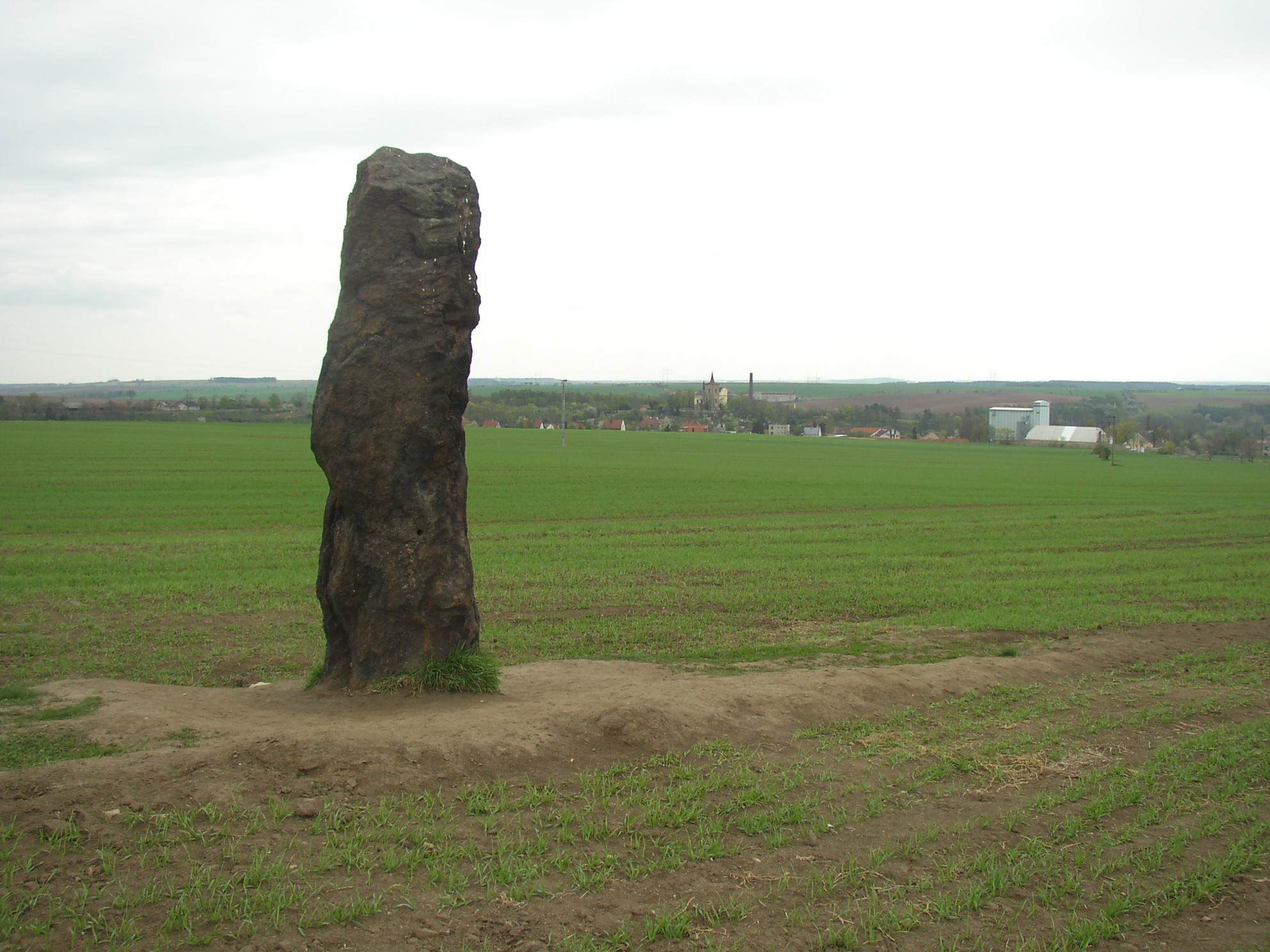
- Klobuky as seen from the menhir

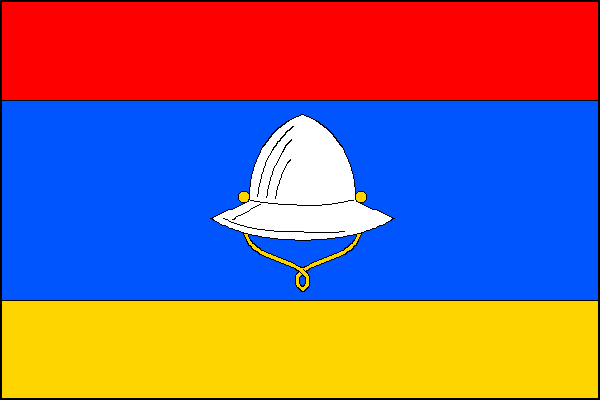
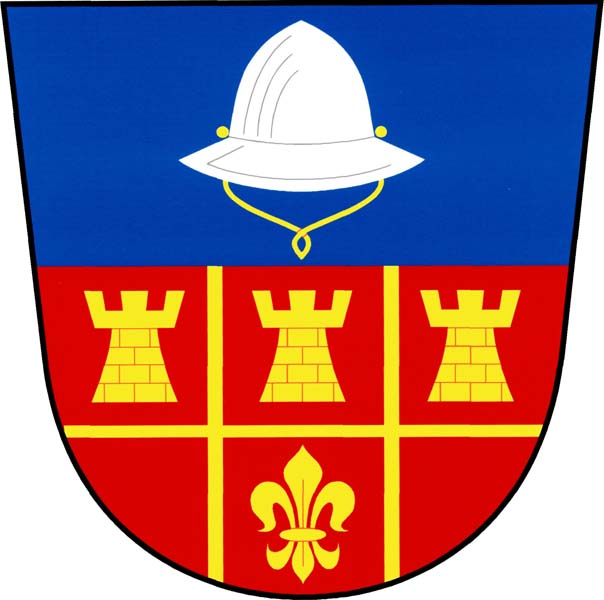
- Flag Coat of arms

- Location in the Czech Republic
- Coordinates: 50°17′39″N 13°59′22″E
- Country: Czech Republic
- Region: Central Bohemian
- District: Kladno
- First mention: 1226

Area
  - Total: 15.87 km^{2} (6.13 sq mi)
- Elevation: 262 m (860 ft)

Population (2026-01-01)
  - Total: 1,034
  - Density: 65.15/km^{2} (168.7/sq mi)
- Time zone: UTC+1 (CET)
  - Summer (DST): UTC+2 (CEST)
- Postal code: 273 74
- Website: www.klobuky.cz

Klobuky is a municipality and village in Kladno District in the Central Bohemian Region of the Czech Republic. It has about 1,000 inhabitants.

== Administrative division ==
Klobuky consists of five municipal parts (in brackets population according to the 2021 census):

- Klobuky (574)
- Čeradice (70)
- Kobylníky (125)
- Kokovice (107)
- Páleček (140)

== Etymology ==
The name of the village was probably derived from its ancient owner or founder named Klobuk or Klobouk (which is also the Czech word for 'hat' and in Old Czech for 'helmet'). Hence the helmet is in the coat of arms.

== Geography ==
Klobuky is located about 18 kilometres (11 mi) northwest of Kladno and 33 km (21 mi) northwest of Prague. It lies in an undulating agricultural landscape in the Lower Ohře Table. The highest point is at 349 m (1,145 ft) above sea level.

== History ==
The first written mention of Klobuky is from 1226, when it was a property of the Premonstratensian convent in Doksany.

== Demographics ==
Historical population

| Year | Pop. | ±% |
|---|---|---|
| 1869 | 1,364 | — |
| 1880 | 1,599 | +17.2% |
| 1890 | 1,684 | +5.3% |
| 1900 | 1,593 | −5.4% |
| 1910 | 1,748 | +9.7% |

| Year | Pop. | ±% |
|---|---|---|
| 1921 | 1,772 | +1.4% |
| 1930 | 1,673 | −5.6% |
| 1950 | 1,347 | −19.5% |
| 1961 | 1,298 | −3.6% |
| 1970 | 1,220 | −6.0% |

| Year | Pop. | ±% |
|---|---|---|
| 1980 | 1,088 | −10.8% |
| 1991 | 979 | −10.0% |
| 2001 | 995 | +1.6% |
| 2011 | 1,029 | +3.4% |
| 2021 | 1,016 | −1.3% |

Source: Censuses

== Transport ==
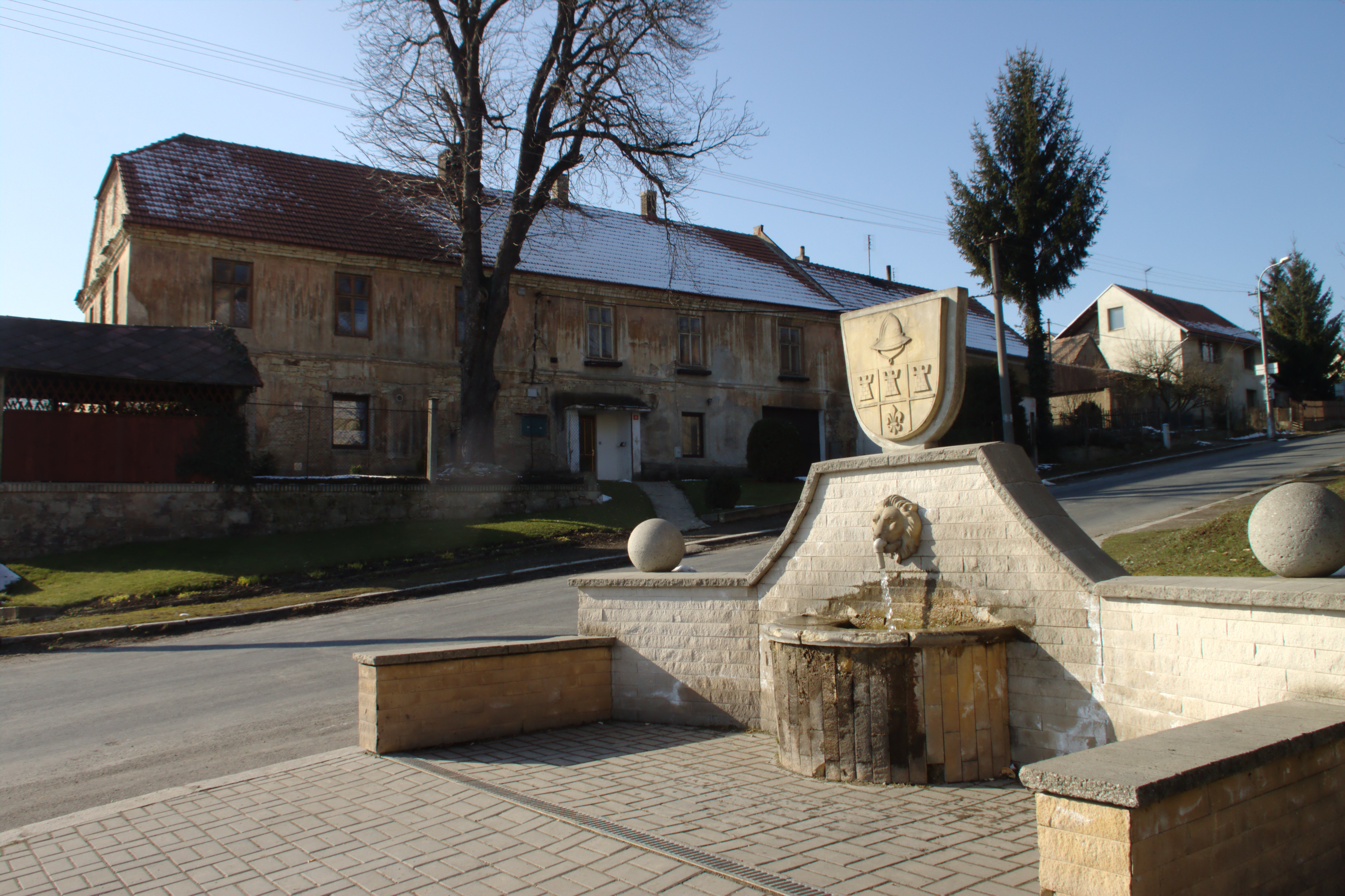
Fountain in the centre of Klobuky

Klobuky is located on the railway line Louny–Kralupy nad Vltavou. In addition to the train station in Klobuky, there is a stop in Páleček.

== Sights ==
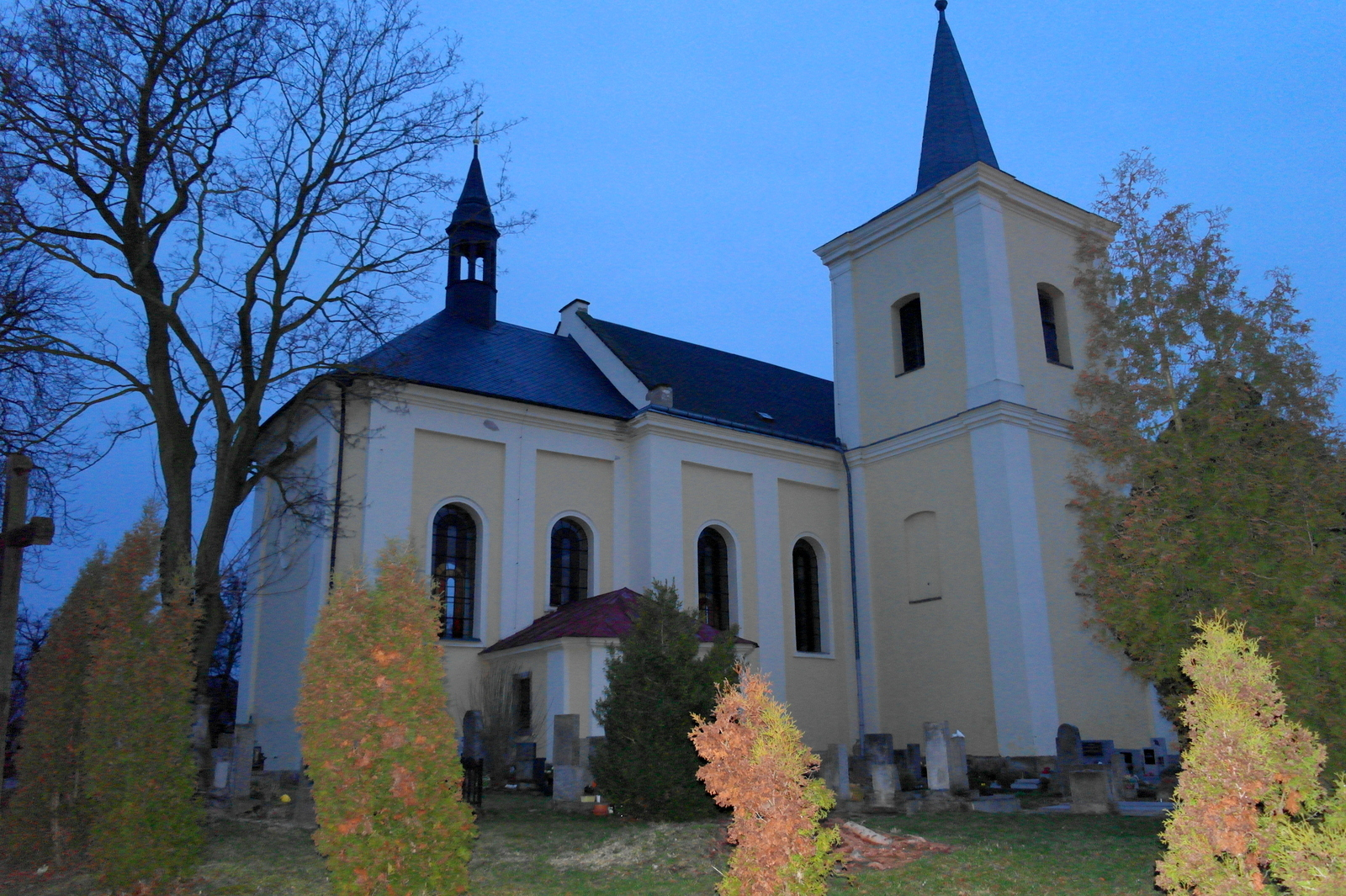
Church of Saint Lawrence

The major local sight is an alleged prehistoric menhir, with a height of 3.5 metres (11.5 ft) the tallest in the Czech Republic. It is an upright, lonely standing stone called Kamenný pastýř ('stone shepherd') or Kamenný muž ('stone man'). It is located in a field several hundred metres northwest of the village.

The main landmark of Klobuky is the Church of Saint Lawrence. It dates back to the 14th century. It was rebuilt and extended in 1729–1735.

== Notable people ==
- Jindřich Šimon Baar (1869–1925), writer; was a priest in Klobuky in 1899–1909
- Jan Malypetr (1873–1947), politician, prime minister of Czechoslovakia
- Ivan Krasko (1876–1958), Slovak poet; worked in local sugar refinery in 1905–1912
- Karel Toman (1877–1946), poet
