= Arlobi menhir =

Archaeological heritage located in Zuia, Álava

Coordinates: 43.03156°N 2.82865°W

The Arlobi menhir is an archaeological heritage site located at the Gorbea Natural Park, in Zuia, Álava (Basque part of Spain). It was found by Oier Suárez Hernando, Miguel Martínez Fernández and Luis M. Martínez Torres on 20 March 2004. The menhir was probably placed there in the Albian Age (Cretaceous 112–98 m.a.) and is made of stones coming from the southern slope of Gorbea, Odoriaga and Usoteguieta mountains. It is the most visited tourist attraction at the Gorbea Natural Park due to its peculiarity. The discovery was very important because of the lack of menhirs in Álava. In fact, the most common ancient sculptures are dolmens, usually as funerary monuments used to bury people in religious ceremonies.

== Description ==
When the menhir was discovered it was composed by three orthogonal fragments of sandstone, headed NE-SW. After studying them, it was concluded that the three pieces could be put together and fitted perfectly to form the original menhir. Despite the impacts the rocks had due to the clearing labours, the menhir is preserved in good conditions. The stones measure 480x60x60 cm and it is considered that its density could reach 2500 kg/m3; so the menhir weights over 4250 kg. Lithologically, its stones are siliceous sandstone which probably come from Illumbe, the slope of Usoteguieta mountain. As the distance between Illumbe and the menhir is over 100m, archaeologists have assumed that the stones were carried by taking advantage of the slope. It was believed that the menhir could be an anthropomorphic sculpture but this discovery has not been verified.

== The archaeological excavation ==
The menhir has been under examination since August 2004. Archaeologists have been able to find where the stone was originally placed. It was discovered that the menhir laid where the South-Western piece of rock was found. In fact, part of that stone was still stuck in the ground. It was also discovered that there was another element that could be part of the menhir: a ring made of rocks which surrounded the main stone. It has been also considered that this ring could be part of the archaeological remains of a human settlement. Besides, there were many other objects such as silex tools that could be related to a human settlement. Archaeologists also found remains that showed humans had been there: sharpening tools and stone hammers (that were probably used in the construction of the menhir).

== Restoration of the menhir ==
The menhir was moved to the Park House in order to be restored. So the pieces were put together again, by introducing four iron bars into the stone. Once the menhir was complete they took it back to the place it belonged. It was placed with a crane in the direction archaeologists thought it had been originally and, after that, it was underpinned. The holes left in the ground because of the archaeological excavation were filled with concrete, which later would be covered with the natural earth that had been removed in the excavations. The landscape is expected to recover its natural moss and lichen so that the remains of the building work will not be spotted.

== Investigations in progress ==
Some other investigations will be held in order to discover more things about this ancient monument. The main structure is going to be delimited and interpreted so as to know more about the building method they used to create this menhir. Other investigations are going to be carried out to work out the chronological and cultural environment there was at the time when it was built. After all this information is gathered, didactic and informative material will be created to inform tourists about the importance of this archeological heritage.

== Route ==
The menhir can be reached from the Centre of the Gorbea Natural Park. The way is 7 km long and it is well indicated by signals. The walk can be done in two hours more or less and is easy to follow.
