= Dušan Meško =

Dušan Meško (born 7 May 1956, in Martin), Slovakia, is a Slovak physician, writer and university professor. He specializes in sports medicine.

== Career ==
A graduate of the Jessenius School of Medicine in Martin, Meško has since 1981 been employed there as an internist. He has since 2002 been the head of the Department of Sports Medicine at the Martin University Hospital. He is a member of several professional societies and committees since 2008 he has been chief expert of the Ministry of Health of the Slovak Republic for the Department of Sports Medicine. Since February 2011, he has held the post of vice-rector of the Comenius University in Bratislava for science, research and doctoral studies.

== Bibliography ==
- 1998: Mesko, Dusan: Vademékum klinickej biochémie (English: Vademecum of Clinical Biochemistry) ISBN 8080630054
- 2003: Mesko, Dusan: Differential Diagnosis by Laboratory Medicine (Slovak: Diferenciálna diagnostika pomocou laboratórnej medicíny) ISBN 3540430571
- 2004: Mesko, Dusan: Akademická příručka ISBN 8080632197
- 2005: Mesko, Dusan: Akademická príručka 2. upravené a doplnené vydanie ISBN 8080632006
- 2005: Mesko, Dusan Telovýchovnolekárske vademecum ISBN 8096944649
