= Michal Drobný =

Slovak neurologist and politician (born 1934)

Member of the National Council
- In office 26 September 1998 – 21 September 2002
- President: Mikuláš Dzurinda (acting); Jozef Migaš (acting); Rudolf Schuster

Personal details
- Born: 27 October 1934 (age 91) Zeleneč, Czechoslovakia(now Slovakia)
- Party: People's Party – Movement for a Democratic Slovakia
- Education: Comenius University in Bratislava

Michal Drobný (born 27 October 1934, Zeleneč, Czechoslovakia (now Slovakia)) is a Slovak neurologist and politician. He was a member of the National Council between 1998 and 2002, representing the People's Party – Movement for a Democratic Slovakia.

== Career ==
Drobný is the head of the Department of Neurology at the Martin University Hospital (since 1977, since 1962 lecturer at Faculty of Medicine in Martin), he is a professor at the Jessenius School of Medicine, Comenius University, a founding member of the European Federation of Neurology and Neurological Emergencies, member of the Board of Donau organizational symposium in neurology and neuroscience, member of the Advisory Board at ILAE (International League Against Epilepsy), a member of the European and the World Federation of Neurology and an active member of IBRO (International Brain Research Organization).

=== Political career ===
He ran for parliament in the 1998 Slovak parliamentary election and was elected for a 4-year-term. While serving in parliament he was active in improving the working condition for the members, as the previous conditions had been so unhealthy that members had developed chronic ophthalmopathy and respiratory disorders such as chronic cough and pneumonia. The ventilation system was so defunct that temperatures spiraled and microbes flourished.

In 2001 it was announced that he would retire from politics and not seek reelection.

== Selected publications ==
- Jombik P, Bahyl V, Drobny M, Spodniak P. Vestibulo-ocular (oVEMP) responses produced by bone-conducted sound stimuli applied to the mid-sagittal plane of the head. J Vestib Res. 2008;18(2-3):117-28.
- Saniova B, Drobny M, Sulaj M. Delirium and postoperative cognitive dysfunction after general anesthesia. Med Sci Monit. 2009 May;15(5):CS81-7.
- Sániová B, Drobný M, Drobná E, Matloobi A. Acute consciousness disorders in intensive care medicine - value of its grading for prognostic conclusion. Neuro Endocrinol Lett. 2012;33(2):167-76.

== Bibliography ==
- 1992: Lectures of Neurology (Matica slovenská) ISBN 8070904151
- 1996: Neurology Lectures (Matica slovenská) ISBN 8096795309
- 2006: Prionové choroby (PCh), Transmisívne spongioformné encefalopatie (TSE), Neuro - AIDS (Reklas) ISBN 8096879235
