= Jan Jakuš =

Slovak physician

- Born: 18 February 1954 (age 72); Trenčín, Czechoslovakia
- Citizenship: Slovakia
- Education: Jessenius School of Medicine; Charles University in Prague
- Scientific career
- Fields: Pathophysiology, biophysics
- Workplaces: Comenius University in Bratislava; Jessenius School of Medicine

Jan Jakuš (born 18 February 1954) is a Slovak medical researcher, author and professor of Pathophysiology.

== Career ==
He studied medicine at, and is currently serving as a professor of biophysics at the Jessenius School of Medicine in Martin which is a part of the Comenius University in Bratislava. He has also served as the head of the department of Biophysics since 2007.

== Selected publications ==
- Jakuš J., Tomori Z., Stránsky A.: "Activity of bulbar respiratory neurones during cough and other respiratory tract reflexes in cats". Physiol. bohemoslov. 34(2), 1985, 127–136.
- Jakuš J., Tomori Z., Stránsky A.: "Bulbar respiratory activity during defensive airways reflexes in cats". Acta Physiol. Hung. 70(2–3), 1987, 245–254.
- Yates B.J., Jakuš J., Miller A.D.: Vestibular effects on respiratory outflow in the decerebrate cat. Brain Res. 629, 1993, 209–217.
- Jakuš J., Stránsky A., Poliaèek I., Baráni H., Bošelová ¼.: Kainic acid lesion to the Lateral tegmental field of medulla. Effects on Cough, Expiration and Aspiration reflexes in anesthetized cats. Physiol. Res., 49(3), 2000, 387–398.
- Jakuš J., Tomori Z.: Neuronal Determinants of Breathing, Coughing and Related Motor Behaviors. Martin, Wist, 2004, 335p. ISBN 80-8049-381-2
- Jakuš J.: Central control of the cough reflex. pp. 117–171. In: Korpáš J., Paintal S., Anand A., eds. Péèová R., Tatár M., Fraòová S., Hanáèek J., Javorka K., Jakuš J., Mokrý J., Nosá¾ová G., Plutinský J., Sadloòová J., Šutovská M.: Cough: from lab to clinic. 2006; New Delhi: Ane Books India, 348s. ISBN 81-8052-107-9

== Bibliography ==
- 2004: Ján Jakuš, Zoltán Tomori, Albert Stránsky. : Neuronal determinants of breathing, coughing and related motor behaviours: Basics of nervous control and reflex mechanisms ISBN 8080493812
