= Jakus =

Jakus or Jakuš is a surname. Notable people with the surname include:

- Jan Jakuš (born 1954), Slovak pathologist
- John Jakus (born 1975), American basketball coach
- Marie Jakus (born c. 1915), American biologist and microscopist
- Stevan Jakuš (1921–1985), Yugoslav footballer
