= Peter Bartoš =

Slovak ice hockey player (born 1973)

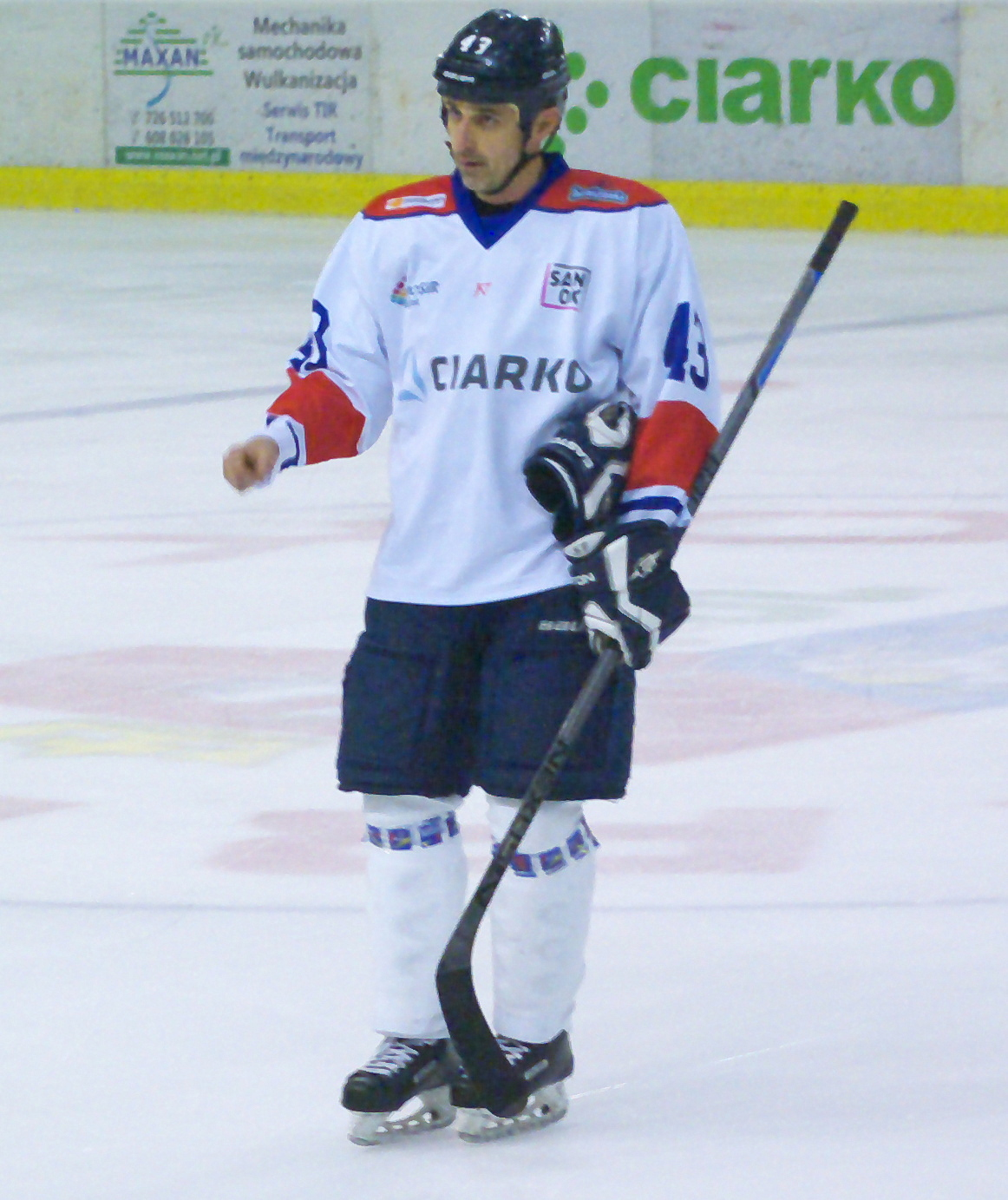
- Born: 5 September 1973 (age 52) Martin, Czechoslovakia
- Height: 6 ft 0 in (183 cm)
- Weight: 183 lb (83 kg; 13 st 1 lb)
- Position: Left wing
- Shot: Right
- Slovak 2.Liga team Former teams: HK Bardejov; Minnesota Wild; HC Kosice
- NHL draft: 214th overall, 2000; Minnesota Wild
- Playing career: 1992–2020

Peter Bartoš (born 5 September 1973) is a Slovak former professional ice hockey left winger. He was drafted in the seventh round, 214th overall, by the Minnesota Wild in the 2000 NHL entry draft. He played thirteen games in the National Hockey League with the Wild in the 2000–01 season. Following his retirement from professional hockey in 2017, he currently plays Slovak 2. Liga team HK Slovan Gelnica.

He is the father of HC Košice player Antonín Bartoš.

Medal record

Representing Slovakia

World Championships
Silver medal – second place	2000 Russia	

== Career statistics ==
=== Regular season and playoffs ===
			Regular season					Playoffs
Season	Team	League	GP	G	A	Pts	PIM	GP	G	A	Pts	PIM
1991–92	HC Hutník ZŤS Martin	SVK-2	33	13	8	21	16	—	—	—	—	—
1992–93	HC Hutník ZŤS Martin	SVK-2	22	6	5	11	4	—	—	—	—	—
1992–93	ASVŠ Dukla Trenčín	TCH	38	2	3	5	—	—	—	—	—	—
1993–94	HC Hutník ZŤS Martin	SVK	42	14	10	24	—	—	—	—	—	—
1994–95	Martinskeho hokeja club	SVK	34	15	20	35	20	3	0	0	0	0
1995–96	Martinskeho hokeja club	SVK	36	23	19	42	8	13	4	1	5	4
1996–97	Martinskeho hokeja club	SVK	46	22	15	37	24	5	1	5	6	0
1997–98	Martinskeho hokeja club	SVK	36	20	26	46	20	3	0	2	2	0
1998–99	HC České Budějovice	CZE	50	17	24	41	16	3	3	0	3	0
1999–00	HC České Budějovice	CZE	52	23	25	48	26	3	0	1	1	6
2000–01	Minnesota Wild	NHL	13	4	2	6	6	—	—	—	—	—
2000–01	Cleveland Lumberjacks	IHL	56	16	26	42	18	4	0	1	1	2
2001–02	HC České Budějovice	CZE	43	18	10	28	22	—	—	—	—	—
2002–03	HC České Budějovice	CZE	52	11	11	22	30	4	0	0	0	0
2003–04	HC České Budějovice	CZE	45	15	5	20	36	—	—	—	—	—
2004–05	HC České Budějovice	CZE-2	12	2	6	8	2	—	—	—	—	—
2004–05	HKm Zvolen	SVK	40	11	13	24	12	17	3	5	8	26
2005–06	HC Košice	SVK	54	15	20	35	38	6	5	1	6	4
2006–07	HC Košice	SVK	54	14	23	37	38	11	2	2	4	6
2007–08	HC Košice	SVK	54	18	34	52	44	19	2	5	7	22
2008–09	HC Košice	SVK	56	26	24	50	54	18	5	6	11	12
2009–10	HC Košice	SVK	47	20	15	35	42	16	9	3	12	16
2010–11	HC Košice	SVK	57	23	30	53	32	14	2	3	5	6
2011–12	HC Košice	SVK	55	16	25	41	42	16	3	11	14	4
2012–13	KH Sanok	POL	37	22	23	45	12	10	3	4	7	10
2013–14	HC Košice	SVK	56	14	33	47	55	17	6	8	14	6
2014–15	HC Košice	SVK	56	8	31	39	32	17	3	8	11	27
2015–16	HC Košice	SVK	54	19	26	45	26	10	2	2	4	12
2016–17	HC Košice	SVK	56	10	12	22	14	6	0	0	0	0
2017–18	MHK Humenné	SVK-3	21	14	20	34	0	—	—	—	—	—
2018–19	KH 58 Sanok	SVK-3	6	1	3	4	2	—	—	—	—	—
2018–19	Bemaco HC 46 Bardejov	SVK-3	10	2	7	9	2	—	—	—	—	—
2019–20	Bemaco HC 46 Bardejov	SVK-3	17	2	12	14	8	—	—	—	—	—
2021–22	HK Čaňa	SVK-3	6	1	1	2	0	—	—	—	—	—
2022–23	HK Slovan Gelnica	SVK-3	1	0	0	0	0	—	—	—	—	—
SVK totals			833	288	376	664	501	191	47	62	109	145
CZE totals			242	84	75	159	130	10	3	1	4	6
NHL totals			13	4	2	6	6	—	—	—	—	—

=== International ===
Year	Team	Event	GP	G	A	Pts	PIM
1996	Slovakia	WCH	1	0	0	0	0
1998	Slovakia	WC	6	0	2	2	4
1999	Slovakia	WC	6	0	1	1	2
2000	Slovakia	WC	9	3	1	4	2
2001	Slovakia	WC	5	0	1	1	2
Senior totals			27	3	5	8	10
