= Julián Podoba =

Slovak endocrinologist

Julián Podoba (9 January 1916 – 31 August 2005) was a Slovak endocrinologist. His research into iodine deficiency and endemic goitre led to the introduction of iodised salt in Slovakia.

== Biography ==
Podoba was born in 1916 in western Slovakia. His father was a farmer and a member of parliament in the First Czechoslovak Republic. Podoba began studying medicine at Comenius University in Bratislava in 1934 and graduated in 1940. During the Second World War, he was forced to resign from his post at the Martin University Hospital because he disagreed with Slovakia's alliance with Nazi Germany, and began working instead at the Hospital of the Workers Social Security Alliance in Bratislava. After the war, he studied endocrinology at Charles University in Prague under Josef Charvát, who was regarded as one of the founders of endocrinology in Czeschoslovakia, and Karel Šilink.

When Podoba returned to Slovakia, he carried out research into endemic goitre based similar field studies conducted by Šilink in Czechia. His research, carried out from 1949 to 1953, showed that most of the Slovakian population was iodine deficient. In some regions, he found a prevalence of endemic goitre in women as high as 80% and cretinism (due to congenital iodine deficiency) as high as 3%. Unlike Šilink's investigations, Podoba also measured urinary iodine concentrations in his subjects, used perchlorate and phenylthiocarbamide tests, and attempted to identify genetic factors involved in the development of endemic goitre.

The Slovak Ministry of Health established the Institute of Endocrinology in 1951 and Podoba was appointed its first director. The institute was incorporated into the Slovak Academy of Sciences in 1954 and renamed the Institute of Experimental Endocrinology in 1967. He became an associate professor of Comenius University in 1968, served as president of the Slovak Endocrine Society from 1967 to 1975, and founded the international medical journal Endocrinologia experimentalis. He retired in 1987 and died in 2005.

== Legacy ==
Iodised salt was introduced in Slovakia in 1951 as a result of Podoba's research on iodine deficiency. As a result, the incidence of endemic goitre declined significantly and cretinism disappeared completely in children. Podoba was awarded the Medal of the President of Slovak Republic in 2003 and was inducted into the Slovak Medical Society's Hall of Fame of Slovak Medicine in 2019.
