= Viera Gašparíková =

Slovak writer, folklorist and Slavist (1928–2023)

- Born: 15 April 1928; Priekopa, First Czechoslovak Republic (today part of Martin, Slovakia)
- Died: 22 February 2023 (aged 94); Bratislava, Slovakia
- Education: Comenius University
- Employer(s): Comenius University; Slovak Academy of Sciences
- Notable work: Katalóg slovenskej ľudovej prózy (1993, 2001 and 2004)

Viera Gašparíková (15 April 1928 – 22 February 2023) was a Slovak writer, folklorist and Slavist. She was a founding member of the Slovak Ethnographic Society and was vice-president of the Slovak Committee of Slavists.

== Biography ==
Gašparíková was born on 15 April 1928 in Priekopa, First Czechoslovak Republic. She was educated at schools in Žilina and Martin. By attending self-education circles in addition to her schooling, she met influential ethnographer Rudolf Bednárik [hu].

Gašparíková studied Slovak language and literature, French language and literature, and ethnography at the Slovak University (now Comenius University, Slovak: Univerzita Komenského v Bratislave) in Bratislava, graduating with a doctorate in philosophy in 1952.

After graduating from university, Gašparíková worked as an assistant at the Department of Ethnography at Comenius University. From 1954 to 1955 she was an editor at the Osveta publishing house. From 1956, she worked as researcher at the Ethnographic Institute of the Slovak Academy of Sciences, where she focused on the influence of folklore and oral history in the development of Slovak literature. She also wrote on the relationship of national minorities to the majority nation in folklore, such as in the Hungarian-Slovak context.

Gašparíková wrote the book Zbojník Michal Vdovec v histórii a folklóre gemerského about the outlaw folk hero and bandit Michal Vdovec [sk] and the folklore of Gemer in 1964. This inspired her children's book Zbojník Mišo Vdovčík about the hero, which was released in 1966. In the 1960s, she also wrote comparative commentaries for an edition of Slovak fairy tales.

From 1979 to 1983, Gašparíková was editor in chief of the academic journal Slovenský národopis (Journal of Slovak Ethnography). She was vice-president of the Slovak Committee of Slavists and was a founding member of the Slovak Ethnographic Society (ESS).

Throughout her career, Gašparíková and her students collected folktales from across Slovakia, which culminated in the publication of Katalóg slovenskej ľudovej prózy in three volumes (1993, 2001 and 2004). The three volumes contained 585 texts, which are arranged by communities and zhupas (administrative divisions), and includes a methodology in the last volume. Gašparíková selected Slovak fairy tales for translation into German for the book Slowakische Volksmärchen (2000).

Gašparíková was awarded the European Fairy Tale Award [de] in 2008.

Gašparíková died on 22 February 2023 in Bratislava, Slovakia, aged 94.
