= Drobný =

Drobný (feminine: Drobná) is a Czech and Slovak surname, meaning 'petty', 'tiny'. Notable people with the surname include:

- Emma Drobná (born 1994), Slovak singer
- Jaroslav Drobný (1921–2001), Czech ice hockey player and amateur tennis player
- Jaroslav Drobný (footballer) (born 1979), Czech footballer
- Michal Drobný (born 1934), Slovak politician
- Sheldon Drobny (1945–2020), American accountant and investor
- Václav Drobný (1980–2012), Czech footballer
