= Lukáš Plank =

- Born: 1951 (age 74–75)
- Citizenship: Slovakia
- Education: Jessenius School of Medicine
- Known for: Molecular pathology Hematopathology; Oncopathology
- Scientific career
- Fields: Medicine, pathology
- Workplaces: Comenius University in Bratislava; Jessenius School of Medicine; Martin University Hospital

Lukáš Plank (born 1951) is a Slovak medical researcher, pathologist, and author.

== Career ==
He studied medicine at, and is currently a professor of pathology at the Jessenius School of Medicine in Martin which is a part of the Comenius University in Bratislava. He was also the head of the department of Pathology at the Martin University Hospital. He is the former chairman of the Slovak Scientific Council (Slovak: Vedecka Rada).

He has written numerous journal articles, authored four textbooks for students and has a record number of citations in the literature. He is considered a leading expert in the fields of oncopathology and hematopathology. His research has made notable contributions regarding the current understanding of certain types of cancers. In November 2011 he was awarded the Mayors' Award by the city of Martin for achievements and significant results in scientific research and medicine.

== Selected publications ==
- Plank L, Hansmann ML, Lennert K. Centrocytic lymphoma. Am J Surg Pathol. 1993 Jun;17(6):638-9; author reply 641. doi: 10.1097/00000478-199306000-00015. PMID 8333563.
- Plank, Szépe, Skálová,: Monoclonal plasmacytic differentiation in small-cell lymphomas of B-cell origin: immunocytoma versus other types. (1997) Cesk Patol. Vol. 33 No. 3 pp 99–105.
- Kodet, Mrhalová, Plank et al.: Mantle cell lymphoma: improved diagnostics using a combined approach of immunohistochemistry and identification [..] (2003) Virchows Arch, Vol. 442 No. 6 pp 538–47
- Kajo, Zúbor, Plank,: Tumor-like manifestation of endosalpingiosis in uterus: a case report. (2005) Pathology Research and Practice, Vol. 201 No. 7 Pages 527–30
- Boudova, Plank, et al.: Cutaneous lymphoid hyperplasia and other lymphoid infiltrates of the breast nipple[..] (2005) American Journal of Dermatopathology, Vol. 27 No. 5 pp 375–86
- Marcinek, Plank, Szépe, Balhárek.: Fibrosis identified in the bone marrow biopsies of patients with essential thrombocythemia:[..] (2008) Cesk. Patol. Vol. 44 No. 3 pp 62–66
- Joensuu H, Vehtari A, Riihimäki J, Nishida T, Steigen SE, Brabec P, Plank L, Nilsson B, Cirilli C, Braconi C, Bordoni A, Magnusson MK, Linke Z, Sufliarsky J, Federico M, Jonasson JG, Dei Tos AP, Rutkowski P. Risk of recurrence of gastrointestinal stromal tumour after surgery: an analysis of pooled population-based cohorts. Lancet Oncol. 2012 Mar;13(3):265-74. doi: 10.1016/S1470-2045(11)70299-6. Epub 2011 Dec 6. PMID 22153892.

== Bibliography ==
- 2002: Macac, Plank et al. :Obecná patologie (General Pathology) ISBN 9788021045491
- 2007: Plank, Hanacek. : Patologická anatómia a patologická fyziológia ( Pathological Anatomy and Pathological Physiology) ISBN 978-80-8063-241-0
- 2009: Rovenský, Plank et al. : Vybrané kazuistiky v reumatológii ( Selected case studies in rheumatology) ISBN 9788080950521
