= BellAmos School =

Súkromná základná škola EduKey (BellAmos School)
- Súkromná základná škola EduKey

Location
- Východná 11441/18B, 03601; Martin, Žilina District; Slovakia
- Coordinates: 49°4′45.01″N 18°55′54.73″E

Information
- Type: Independent, Coeducational
- Motto: Každý z nás je v niečom najlepší
- Established: 1996
- Founder: Mgr. Ján Zuberec
- Grades: K–9
- Campus: Urban
- Mascot: Alphabet King
- Accreditation: Ministry of Education, Science, Research and Sport of the Slovak Republic
- Affiliation: Slovak National Association of Independent Schools, Pallas Athena
- Website: http://www.edukey.edupage.org

EduKey (BellAmos) School is a private, co-educational day school for grades K–9 located in Martin, Slovakia.
