= Martin Obuch =

Slovak ice hockey player

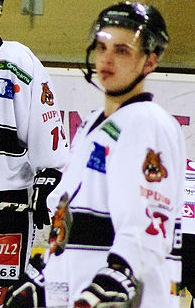
- Born: October 8, 1991 (age 34) Martin, Czechoslovakia
- Height: 6 ft 3 in (191 cm)
- Weight: 187 lb (85 kg; 13 st 5 lb)
- Position: Defence
- Shot: Left
- Slovak Extraliga team: MHC Martin
- NHL draft: Undrafted
- Playing career: 2009–2022

Martin Obuch (born October 8, 1991) is a Slovak former professional ice hockey defenceman who played with Bordeaux in the FFHG Division 1.
