= Eva Kolníková =

Slovak numismatist and classicist

- Born: 20 April 1935 (age 91); Příbor, Czechoslovakia
- Occupation: Numismatist

Eva Kolníková (née Eva Valentová, born 20 April 1935) is a Slovak numismatist. She specialises in the Celtic coinage of Slovakia, as well as the importance of coinage with relation to Roman-Germanic interactions. She has had marked success in disentangling the complex relationships between the coinages and publishing them accessibly. Research projects have included the cataloguing of coin finds from Němčice nad Hanou, the Bratislava Castle hoard, amongst others.

Kolníková was born in the village of Klokočov, which is now a part of the town Příbor. Her parents were teachers. She was the first out of six siblings.

Kolníková graduated from Comenius University in Bratislava in 1960. From 1973 to 1978 she was head of Department at the Institute of Archeology of the Hungarian Academy of Sciences. From 1978 to 1986 she was its scientific secretary. She is a member of the National Numismatic Committee of the Slovak Republic.

Her husband Titus Kolník was an archaeologist.

== Awards ==
- 1995 Ľudovít Štúr Golden Plaque of the SzTA

== Selected works ==
- Kolníková, Eva. "Coins of the Bohemian and Moravian Celts within the area of La Tène settlement in present‑day Slovakia–reasons and consequences of their occurrence." Studia Hercynia 26.1 (2022): 133-157.
- Kolníková, Eva. "Němčice." Ein Macht-, Industrie-und Handelszentrum der Latènezeit in Mähren und Siedlungen am ihren Rande. Komentierter Fundkatalog. Münzen. Spisy Archeologického ústavu AV ČR Brno 43 (2012).
- Kolníková, Eva. "«Biatec-Münzen» und die spätkeltische Kunst." Études celtiques 37.1 (2011): 63-80.
- Kolníková, Eva. Die Markomannenkriege im Lichte der Fundmünzen aus der Slowakei. Archäol. Inst. der Akad. der Wiss. der Tschechischen Republik Brno, 1994.
