= Ester Plicková =

Slovak ethnographer (1928–2011)

- Born: 2 July 1928; Bratislava, Czechoslovakia
- Died: 1 December 2011 (aged 83); Bratislava, Slovakia
- Occupations: ethnographer, photographer
- Years active: 1952–1989
- Known for: Slavic pottery preservation

Ester Plicková (2 July 1928 – 1 December 2011) was a Slovak ethnographer and photographer with a specialty in folk pottery. Working as an ethnographer, lecturer and professional photographer, Plicková documented and researched folk culture and crafts. She received the Gold Medal of Ľudovíta Štúra in 1988 for her work to preserve and conserve Slovak folk culture.

== Early life ==
Ester Plicková was born on 2 July 1928 in Bratislava, Czechoslovakia to the historian, Vladimír Plicka. From childhood, Plicková and her sister were active in sports and involved in cultural activities. In addition to being an expert of Bratislava's history, her father wrote children's stories and her uncle, Karel Plicka was a noted photographer. As a child, Plicková often accompanied her uncle on photographic expeditions to unusual places and served him by carrying his equipment and observing his work. She attended high school at the School of Arts and Crafts, before beginning her higher education at the Comenius University in the philosophy faculty. Simultaneously, she completed a two-year course at the School of Photography Arts in Bratislava and spent a year studying in Prague, taking courses on art history and ethnography, before graduating in 1952.

== Career ==
In 1952, Plicková was hired as the first ethnographer at the Slovak National Museum and left there in 1955, when she began working at the Institute of Ethnology. In 1961, she defended her thesis for her PhD with a study of Slavic Pottery. Early in her career she recognized that social change was replacing traditional culture and photography was a means to preserve artistic expression, rites, rituals, and traditions. Travelling the country, she took photographs of folk festivals and craft shows, architectural monuments, industrial works, and nature. Some of the images she made in the early part of her career depict items which are no longer extant, such as the bombed Apollo refinery, a mining shaft in Kremnica, or the ruins of the Bratislava Castle, before its restoration.

As part of her duties at the Institute of Ethnology, Plicková organized numerous conferences and exhibitions in addition to her lectures. In a 1966 collaboration with Vladimír Scheufler, she co-authored the program for a nationwide exhibition of Czechoslovak folk pottery with examples spanning from the 16th century to the 1960s. In 1978, she worked on an exhibition in Faenza, Italy featuring Slovak ceramics. Plicková also processed multiple collections, such as Štefan Cyril Parrák's Trnava ceramics grouping. Linking her ethnographic work to her photography, Plicková worked as a professional photographer and exhibited her photographs in numerous domestic and international venues, such as one held in Baghdad in 1967.

Between 1961 and 1986 Plicková was a member of the international council of the European magazine, Demos, which was published in Germany until 2002. She published numerous scientific studies and photographic collections. Among her most known works were Pozdíšovské hrnčiarstvo (Late Slavic Pottery, 1959), Dunaj v Československu (photography: The Danube in Czechoslovakia, 1965), Jadran (photography: The Adriatic, 1976 and 1980), Maľované salaše (Painted huts, 1982) and Krása hliny (The Beauty of Clay, 1996). Also well known are her pictorial collections published in the book Banská Štiavnica (1957, 1973, 1982).

In 1988, Plicková was awarded the Gold Medal Ľudovíta Štúra from the Slovak Academy of Sciences (SAS) for her contributions to preserving the folk culture of Slovakia. She retired from the Institute of Ethnology in 1989 and though she had problems with her vision in her retirement, she worked with the Centre for Folk Art Production (Slovak: Ústredie ľudovej umeleckej výroby (ÚĽUV)) in their development and continued her research and publishing. In 2005, the SAS recognized her contributions again by honoring her as the Personality of the Year.

== Death and legacy ==
Plicková died on 1 December 2011 in Bratislava, Slovakia. Shortly before her death, a solo exhibition of her photographic works was presented.
