= Ľubomír Belák =

Slovak musician, composer, and producer (born 1951)

- Ľubomír Belák in 2007
- Born: 5 January 1951 (age 75); Bratislava
- Other names: Ľubo Belák
- Occupations: composer, TV producer
- Years active: 1968–present
- Known for: music director of various music festivals
- Website: http://www.lubobelak.sk

Ľubomír Belák (born 5 January 1951 in Bratislava) is a Slovak musician, vocalist, music composer and TV producer. His father Michal Belák was a presenter, singer and actor, and his mother Pavla Adámková Beláková was a singer in choir of the Slovak National Theater. His older sister Jana Beláková was a singer and his younger sister Daniela Luthová is a vogue designer. In 1983 he graduated from Philosophical Faculty at the Comenius University in Bratislava.

== Career ==
In 1960s Belák started in bigbeat group The Players formed at the basic school. Since 1968 his orchestra played with the Slovak popular singers Eva Kostolányiová and Karol Duchoň. Later with his sister Jana he created a vocal duo performing with his group "Skupina Ľuba Beláka". In 1981 he founded the rock group LBT that published an LP in the Opus Records. The same year he helped to produce another LP for popular entertainment duo Milan Lasica and Július Satinský.

Belák was a music director of various music festivals including Bratislavská lýra, Bratislavské džezové dni, etc. Since 1984 he worked at the Slovenská televízia.

From 1992 he became an independent TV producer, and created TV shows including "Čo dokáže ulica", "Rhytmick", "Život zvaný droga", "Music klub", etc.

== Discography ==
- 1980 – Karol Duchoň – skupina Ľuba Beláka
- 1981 – Milan Lasica, Július Satinský a Jaroslav Filip – Bolo nás jedenásť
- 1981 – Rezsõ Soltész – Robot love
- 1982 – Mixed Co. – Islands
- 1983 – Radošinské naivné divadlo – Jááánošík (double album)
- 2008 – Ľubo Belák – Bigbíťák

== Film music ==
- Autobus – short film
- Droga – short TV film
- Slovensko – medium long film
- Slniečko na rukavičke – TV series
- Mať tak o koliesko viac – animated TV series

== TV production ==
- Čo dokáže ulica (series)
- Rhythmick (series)
- Keď odchádza kapela (series)
- Príbeh zvaný droga (series)
- Ide pieseň okolo (series)
- Detektívka (music film of popular Slovak group Elán)
- Papierové lásky (TV dramatization of the story with songs)

== Theoretical research – mass communication ==
- Projekt Verejnoprávnej televízie – 2006
- Punk a nová vlna (dissertation work at Philosophical Faculty of Comenius University)
