= Martin Airfield (Slovakia) =

Airport in Martin there is runway 800 meters

Martin Airport Letisko Martin
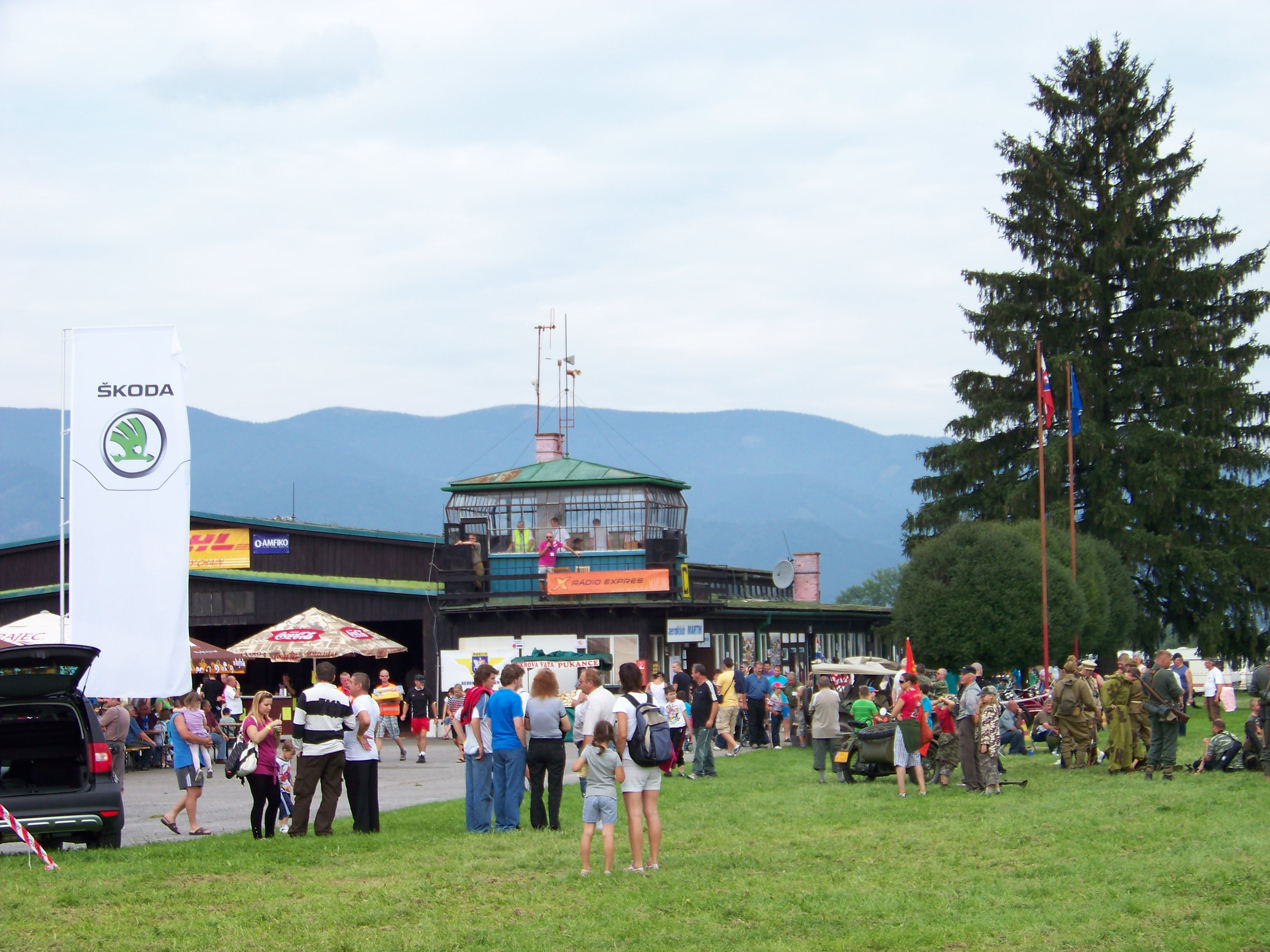
- IATA: none; ICAO: LZMA

Summary
- Airport type: Public
- Owner: Aeroklub Martin
- Operator: Aeroklub Martin
- Serves: Martin
- Location: Martin, Slovakia
- Elevation AMSL: 1,378 ft / 428 m
- Coordinates: 49°03′55″N 018°57′03″E
- Website: www.letiskomartin.sk; www.aeroklubmartin.sk
- Interactive map of Martin Airport

Runways
Direction	Length		Surface
Direction	m	ft	Surface
36/18	800	2,625	grass

Martin Airfield (ICAO: LZMA) is a recreational aerodrome in Martin, Slovakia. It features a grass runway of 800 metres length, several club buildings, and hangars.

== Airlines and destinations ==
As of 20 June 2024, there are no scheduled passenger services to/from Martin Airfield.
