= Antonín Bartoš (ice hockey) =

Slovak ice hockey player

- Born: 1 December 2003 (age 22) České Budějovice, Czech Republic
- Height: 6 ft 0 in (183 cm)
- Weight: 168 lb (76 kg; 12 st 0 lb)
- Position: Defenceman
- Shoots: Right
- Slovak Extraliga team Former teams: HC Košice; HK Martin (loan)

Antonín Bartoš (born 1 December 2003) is a Slovak professional ice hockey defenceman. He celebrated the Slovak Extraliga title in his premier session with HC Košice.

Previously he played with the team's junior squads and spent most of the previous session on loan at the HK Martin playing the second highest league.

Bartoš was born in České Budějovice, where his father Peter Bartoš played before joining Minnesota Wild. His twin brother Jan Bartoš is also a hockey player.

== Career statistics ==
=== Regular season and playoffs ===
			Regular season					Playoffs
Season	Team	League	GP	G	A	Pts	PIM	GP	G	A	Pts	PIM
2022–23	HC Košice	SVK	38	0	1	1	2	11	0	0	0	0
SVK totals			38	0	1	1	2	11	0	0	0	0

== Awards and honors ==
Award	Year
Slovak
Champion	2023
