= Obchodná akadémia Martin =

Business Academy Martin

Location
- Bernolákova 2 Martin; Slovakia
- Coordinates: 49°3′44″N 18°55′5″E

Information
- Type: Public
- Established: 1885
- Enrollment: approx. 480
- Campus: Urban
- Colors: Gold and Black
- Website: www.oamt.eu

Obchodná akadémia Martin (English: Business Academy Martin) or (OAMT) is a co-educational public secondary school in Martin, Slovakia, founded in 1885 as the Turiec Saint Martin Hungarian Royall Secondary school OAMT offers business-oriented courses to prepare students for careers in finance, economics, law and marketing. The school also combines its business curriculum with an extensive academic program that gears towards preparation for university. Since 1988 the school headquarters the OAMT Language Center which provides language courses and language certificates in English, German, Spanish, Russian, French and Italian

According to the latest National examination ranking, the school belongs to one of the top Business oriented high schools in Slovakia.

In the years 2010-2011 the school undertook a reconstruction of its main building financed by the European Regional Development Fund.

== Academics ==
Known for its academic prowess throughout the region, OAMT's achieve highly in regional and national tournaments, scientific Olympiads and also in International competitions.

=== Admission ===
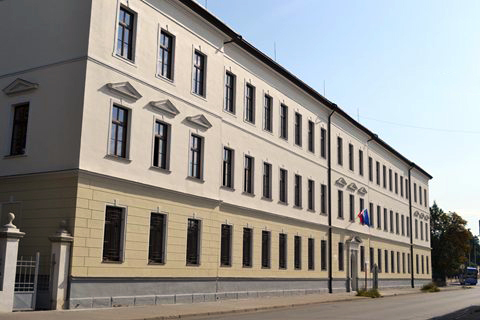
Main building of the school

Admission to the Business Academy Martin is based on school records, average percentage from the national MONITOR testing and the average GPA from grade 5 to 9. Candidates receive notification of acceptance, rejection, or wait list in March.

=== Curriculum ===
Business Academy Martin's curriculum consists of Economics, Macroeconomics, Economical Geography, Applied Business Informatics, Business Correspondence, Accounting, Law studies, Civics, History, Slovak, first foreign language (English, German) and a second foreign language (English, German, Russian, French), Math, Statistics, Modern Communication studies and Physical Education.

=== International partnership ===
The school has a bilateral partnership with three foreign secondary schools in Germany, Poland and Czech Republic. The school also participates in the Comenius program of the EU.
