= Pavol Steiner =

Czechoslovak water polo player

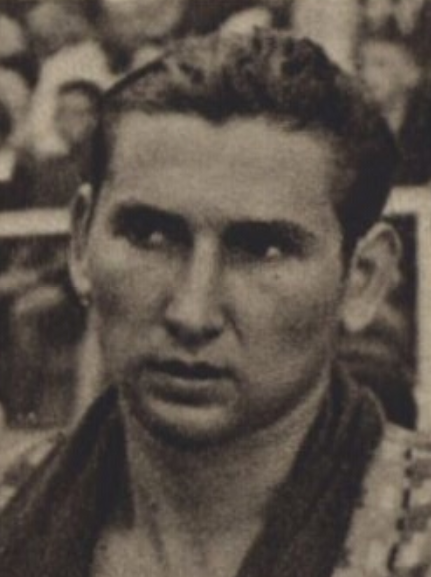
- Pavol Steiner in 1932

Personal information
- Native name: Pavel Steiner
- Nationality: Slovak
- Born: 29 March 1908 Pozsony, Kingdom of Hungary, Austria-Hungary (present-day Bratislava, Slovakia)
- Died: 4 June 1969 (aged 61) Martin, Žilina, Czechoslovakia
- Occupation: cardiology surgeon
- Employer: Martin University Hospital

Sport
- Country: Czechoslovakia
- Sport: Water polo, swimming
- Club: PTE Bratislava
- Coached by: Ľudovít Stahl
Medal record
Men's swimming
Representing Czechoslovakia
European Aquatics Championships
| Bronze medal – third place | 1931 Paris | 100 m freestyle |
Maccabiah Games
| Gold medal – first place | 1932 Mandatory Palestine | 100m freestyle |
| Gold medal – first place | 1932 Mandatory Palestine | 3x100m medley relay |
| Gold medal – first place | 1932 Mandatory Palestine | 4x200m medley relay |
| Gold medal – first place | 1935 Mandatory Palestine | 100m freestyle |
| Gold medal – first place | 1935 Mandatory Palestine | 4x200m freestyle relay |
| Gold medal – first place | 1935 Mandatory Palestine | Water Polo |

Pavol Steiner, also Pavel Steiner and Paul Steiner (29 March 1908 in Pozsony (now Bratislava) – 4 June 1969 in Martin, Žilina) was a Slovak Olympic water polo player and swimmer representing Czechoslovakia. He was also a cardiology surgeon. Steiner competed in the 1928 Summer Olympics in water polo, won a bronze medal at the 1931 European Aquatics Championships in swimming, and won five swimming gold medals and one water polo gold medal combined at the 1932 Maccabiah Games and 1935 Maccabiah Games in Mandatory Palestine.

== Water polo and swimming career ==
Steiner was a Slovak Jewish, and was a member of Jewish sport clubs in interwar Czechoslovakia. He competed at 19 years of age with the Czechoslovakia men's national water polo team in the 1927 European Water Polo Championship in Bologna, Italy, in which they came in 7th.

Steiner competed in the 1928 Summer Olympics in Amsterdam, the Netherlands, coming in 9th with the Czechoslovakia men's national water polo team in water polo at the Games. He also competed in swimming, and won a bronze medal at the 1931 European Aquatics Championships in Paris in the 100 m freestyle with the Czechoslovakia men's national swimming team.

Steiner competed in swimming at the 1932 Maccabiah Games in Mandatory Palestine, the first Maccabiah Games, and won three gold medals. He won the 100m freestyle (breaking the record from Czechoslovakia), the 3x100m medley relay, and the 4x200m medley relay.

He competed at the 1935 Maccabiah Games. There, Steiner won two gold medals in swimming, in the 100m freestyle and in the 4x200m freestyle relay. He also won a team gold medal in water polo, as Czechoslovakia came out ahead of Austria and Palestine.

== Honours ==
=== Olympic Games ===
- 1928 — 9th place

=== European Championship ===
- 1927 — 7th place

=== European Aquatics Championships ===
- 1931 — 3rd place

== Cardiology surgeon ==
Steiner was a cardiology surgeon at Martin University Hospital in Martin, and performed there the first open cardiac surgery in Slovakia.
