= Marja Holecyová =

Slovak fantasy writer

Mária Holecyová
- Born: 28 August 1988 (age 37); Nitra, Czechoslovakia
- Occupations: Mathematician, fantasy writer
- Writing career
- Pen name: Marja Holecyová
- Genre: Historical fantasy

Marja Holecyová (born Mária Holecyová 28 August 1988) is a Slovak mathematician and fantasy writer.

== Education ==
Holecyová was born in Nitra. She studied Mathematics at the Comenius University. Her PhD thesis Maximum Principle for Infinite Horizon Discrete Time Optimal Control Problems was supervised by professor Pavel Brunovský and defended in 2016.

== Writing ==
Holecyová started writing Harry Potter fan fiction as a 16 years old under the pseudonym Marja Holecyová. Encouraged by the popularity of her writing she send a manuscript of her own fantasy story set in Slovakia and based on local mythology Mariotovi dediči (Heirs of Mariot) to the Slovak branch of Czech fantasy and sci-fi published Fragment at the age of 20. The success of the book resulted in three sequels published over the course of 2010 and 2011. In 2016, she published a historical fantasy novel set in the 16th century Kingdom of Hungary called Korene Hriechu (Roots of sin)
