= Vladimír Fábry =

American lawyer and diplomat

- Born: 21 November 1920; Liptovský Svätý Mikuláš, Czechoslovakia
- Died: 18 September 1961 (aged 40)
- Education: Comenius University

Vladimír Fábry (21 November 1920 – 18 September 1961) was a Slovak and also later naturalised American lawyer and diplomat.

He was born in Liptovský Svätý Mikuláš as a son of a lawyer and politician Pavol Fábry and his wife Oľga Viera Fábryová. He studied law at the Comenius University in Bratislava.

During the World War II, when his father was prisoned by nazis, he took part in the illegal resistance. Since 1946, he worked at the Czechoslovakia's mission at the United Nations in New York. After a communist coup d'etat in 1948 he decided to stay in the United States. He applied for the citizenship which he received in 1959. Whole his family including his father Pavol Fábry and his sister Olga, who also took a job in the United Nations, stayed in emigration.

He continued working in the diplomatic posts in the United Nations, including participation during the foundation of the International Atomic Energy Agency. He represented the UN in political and security negotiations in Indonesia, Israel, Egypt and Congo. Finally he became a personal secretary to the Secretary-General of the UN Dag Hammarskjöld. They both died in the airplane crash on 18 September 1961 near to the city of Ndola in Zambia.
