= Tomáš Brcko =

Slovak ice hockey player

- Born: 8 February 1988 (age 37) Martin, Czechoslovakia
- Height: 6 ft 0 in (183 cm)
- Weight: 176 lb (80 kg; 12 st 8 lb)
- Position: Defence
- Shoots: Left
- Slovak Extraliga team: MHC Martin
- NHL draft: Undrafted
- Playing career: 2007–present

Tomáš Brcko (Slovak pronunciation: [ˈtɔmaːʃ ˈbr̩t͡skɔ]; born 8 February 1988) is a Slovak professional ice hockey defenceman who is currently playing with the Sheffield Steeldogs of the English Premier Ice Hockey League (EPIHL)
