= Martin University Hospital =

The Martin University Hospital

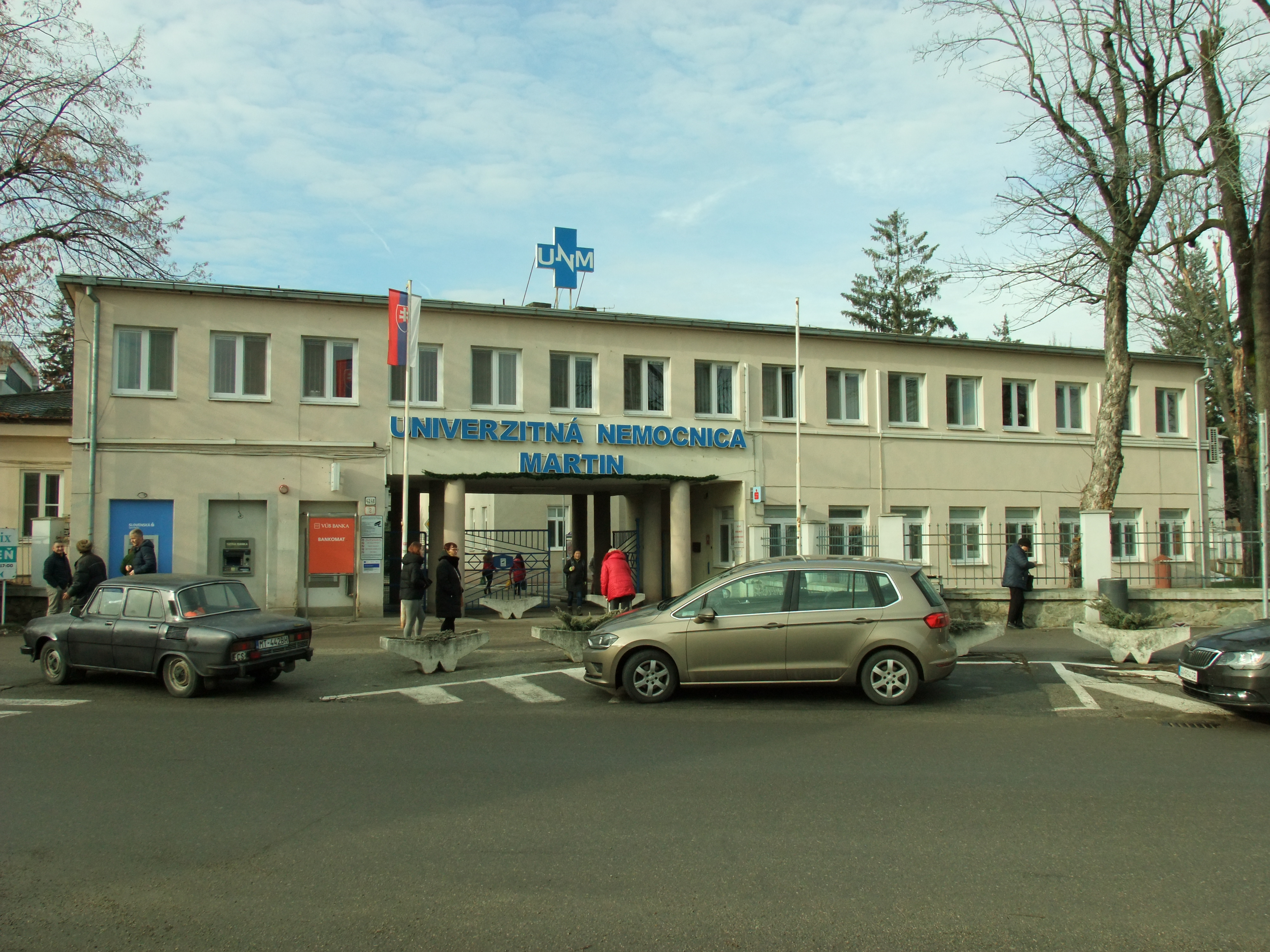

Geography
- Location: Ul. Kollarova 2, Martin, Slovakia
- Coordinates: 49.06038°N 18.91946°E

Organisation
- Care system: Public
- Type: Teaching
- Affiliated university: Jessenius School of Medicine

Services
- Emergency department: Yes, accident and emergency
- Beds: 900

History
- Founded: 1889

Links
- Website: http://www.mfn.sk
- Lists: Hospitals in Slovakia

The Martin University Hospital (Slovak: Univerzitná nemocnica Martin, abbreviated to UNM) is a Slovak public university hospital located in the Martin municipality, in the county of Zilina, north-east of the Slovak capital Bratislava. It is a teaching hospital and it is the main university hospital affiliated with the Jessenius School of Medicine. The hospital has over 1,700 employees. Martin University Hospital has 900 beds in total including all sectors. The current director of the hospital is Dušan Krkoška.

== History ==
Long known for its curative thermal springs, the region of Turiec (German: Turz) has a history as a destination for people with various illnesses. King Ladislaus IV of Hungary wrote of its healing effects in 1281 as did King Sigismund of Luxembourg in 1423. In 1532 Johannes Barbierus of Mosovce became the first permanent doctor to settle here, and later in 1680 the Jesuits set up a monastic pharmacy at the site.

=== 1888-1945: War and epidemics ===
The present hospital, however, was not completed until 1888; after a lengthy process, operations did not commence until 1889. The hospital suffered from chronic lack of skilled doctors and beds were scarce, yet within a few years over 200 patients per year were treated, most with lung and intestinal disorders. In 1892 a cholera epidemic struck the region, this along with recurrent outbreaks of tuberculosis made sure that new wards for patients with infectious diseases were required to be built.

During World War I Martin Hospital was converted to an auxiliary army hospital and used for treating wounded soldiers. As the war progressed and the number of patients increased, the hospital undertook rapid expansion to accommodate them. After the war, with increasing population the hospital again needed to expand, and in 1923 a new surgical building was constructed. However, as beds were still insufficient, the authorities resorted to buying adjacent private residences to alleviate the shortage. In 1934 the Department of Gynecology was completed.

The World War II years again saw the hospital being used as a military reserve hospital, but also the construction of both pediatric and otolaryngology wards, and despite having to dismiss all Czech and Jewish doctors it remained in service throughout the war years.

=== 1945-present ===
As a result of the war the hospital in Martin had suffered serious damage. The consequences of fighting had taken its toll and buildings were in need of significant structural repair. It had also become necessary to supplement the lack of medical and technical material. Jàn Longauer became the new manager and things started to improve. A new generation of doctors arrived who contributed to the growth of professional and social prestige. One of those doctors was Vladimir Galanda who in Turiec developed a high level of medical care for children. Another was the father of modern Czechoslovak cardiac surgery Pavol Steiner, who performed in Martin the first open cardiac surgery in Slovakia. By the 1960s it had become a teaching hospital serving medical students from the Jessenius School of Medicine, also located in Martin, and new departments were added continuously.

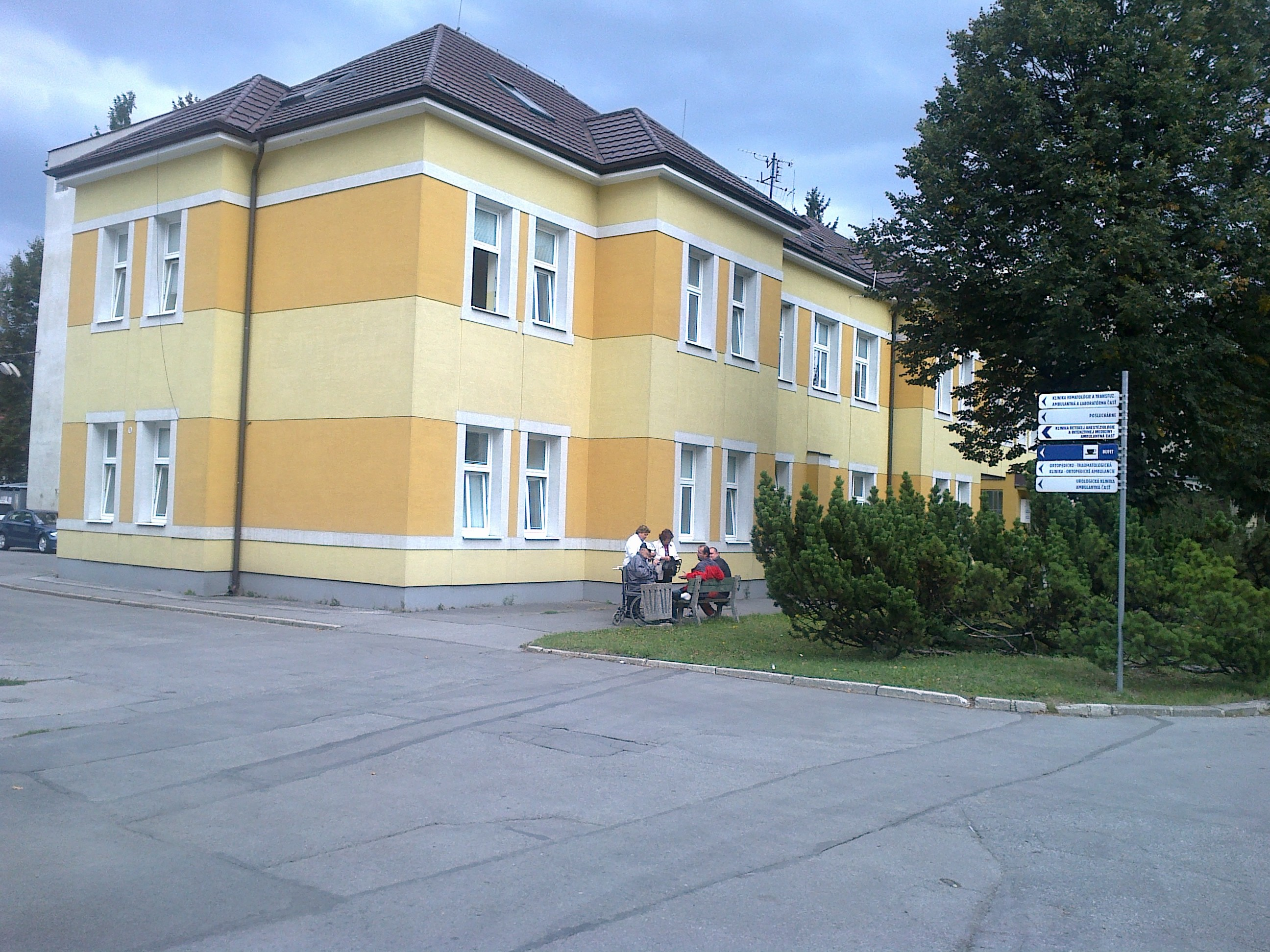
Department of Stomatology

In 1992 several units were created including a separate Neonatal Unit, a Department of tropical disease, a Department of Gastroenterology, a Department of Parasitology and Department of Clinical Oncology. A year later, the ear-nose-throat clinic changed its name to the Department of Otorhinolaryngology as it was no longer part of the Surgical Clinic Department of Pediatric Surgery and Department of Neurosurgery. The Skin Clinic was renamed the Department of Dermatology and the Women's Clinic of Gynaecology and Obstetrics. The Anaesthesiology and Resuscitation Department became the Department of Anesthesiology and Intensive Care Medicine in 1996.

In early 2002, changes occurred in the teaching of basic medicine. Centers for teaching medical students in pediatric surgery, sports medicine, neonatal, and the Department of Clinical Biochemistry became separate clinics. Over the years the hospital has undergone thorough modernization including a new surgical department completed in 2011. In September 2012 the Clinic of Ophthalmology performed Slovakia's first intra-ocular lens implantation, curing two patients with cataracts. In July 2010, the hospital changed its name from Martin Faculty Hospital to its current name, Martin University Hospital.

== Specialties ==
As of 25 October 2013

Department of Children and Adolescents

- Center for children with diabetes mellitus
- Center for children with growth hormone deficiency

Department of Dermatology

- Center for pemphigoid autoimmune diseases in dermatology
- Center for biological treatment of psoriasis and dermatoses

Department of Internal Medicine I

- Center for Invasive and Interventional Cardiology,
- Martin University Hospital Transplantation Center

Department of Medicine II

- Center for diagnosis and treatment of resistant peptic ulcers and gastrointestinal neuroendocrine tumors
- Center for indication and application of biological treatment in gastroenterology

Department of Infectology and Travel Medicine

- Center for Tropical Diseases and travel medicine
- Center for diagnosis and treatment of chronic viral hepatitis
- Center for follow-up and treatment of HIV positive people

Department of Gynecology and Obstetrics

- Perinatology Center

Department of Hematology and Transfusion

- National Center for hemostasis and thrombosis

Department of Pneumology and phtiseology

- Center to provide long-term home oxygen therapy
- Center for diagnosis and treatment of sleep related breathing disorders

Department of Pathology

- Center for centralized diagnosis of rare tumors of GIT
- Center for the detection of HER2 status in malignant tumors of epithelial origin
- Center for diagnostic biopsy of hematopoietic diseases and lymphatic tissue
- Center for diagnostic biopsy of skin diseases

Department of Neurology

- Center for Cerebrovascular disease in Neurology
- Center for Neuromuscular diseases in Neurology
- Center for demyelinating diseases of the central nervous system

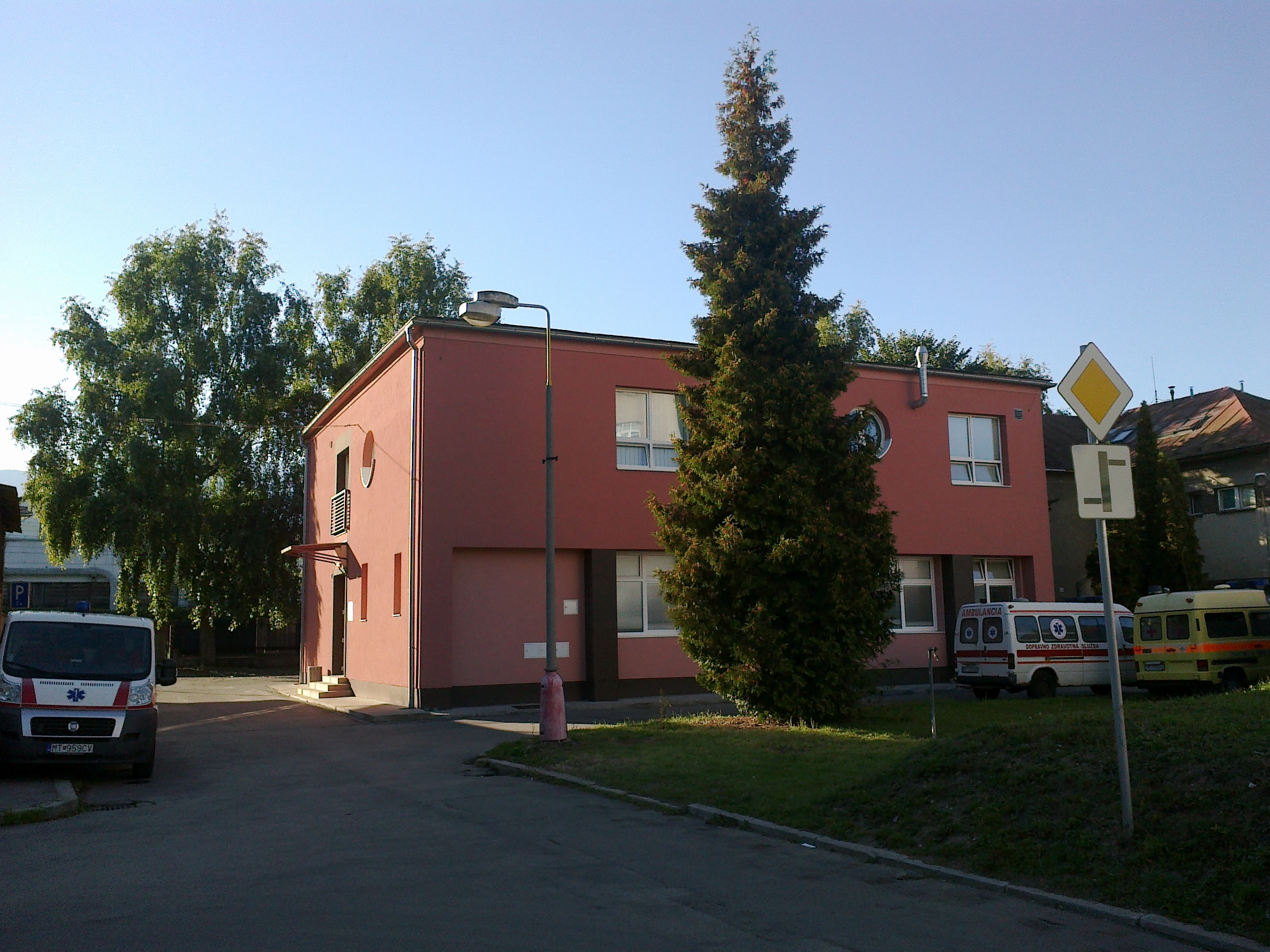
Department of Pathology

== Ministry of Health Experts ==
As of 11 May 2016

- Professor Peter Banovcin, MD., PhD., Paediatrics
- Associate Professor Julian Hamzik, MD. PhD., Thoracic Surgery
- Professor Dušan Meško, MD., PhD., Sports medicine
- Associate Professor Dalibor Murgas, MD., PhD., Paediatric surgery
- Professor Juraj Pec, MD., PhD., Dermatovenerology
- Professor Lukáš Plank, MD., PhD., Pathology
- Professor Mirko Zibolen, MD., PhD., Neonatology
- Associate Professor Ivan Rezňák, MD., PhD., Nuclear Medicine

== Notable doctors ==
- Pavol Steiner (1908–1969), Olympic water polo player, swimmer, and cardiac surgeon

== See also ==
- List of hospitals in Slovakia
