= Mansion in Záturčie =

Manor house in Martin, Slovakia

Coordinates: 49°5′19″N 18°54′58″E

Mansion is a building situated in Záturčie, Slovakia.

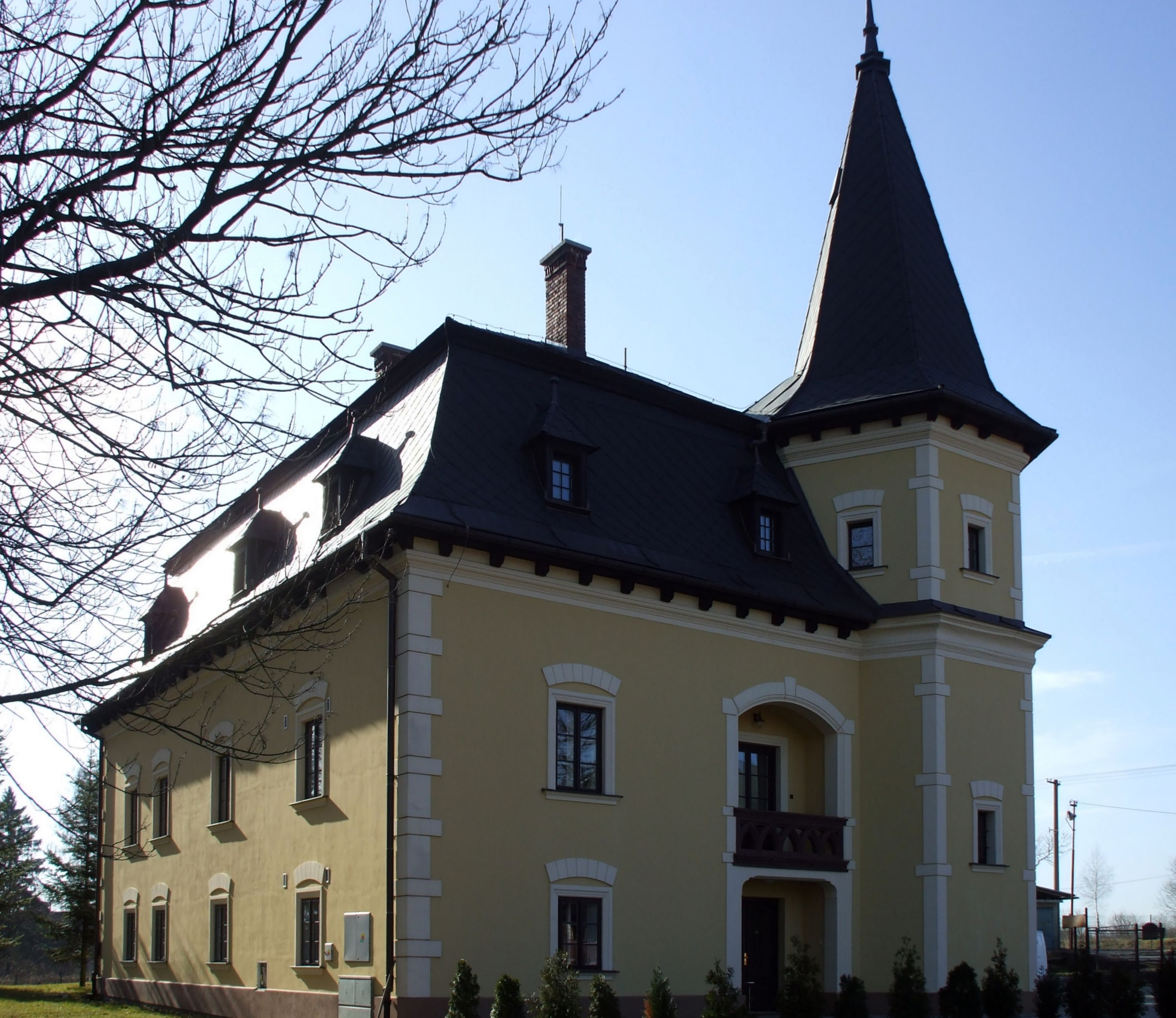
Mansion in Záturčie

== History ==
An evangelical church was founded by Frantisek the V. Revay in the village named Horne Zaturcie in 1640. In 1872, the church was closed due to anti-reformation under the Hungarian monarchy. In 1894, Frantisek the IX of Revay ordered the reconstruction of the building to a mansion. After Frantisek's death, Jan Reichl, a man who served him since he was 14, inherited the mansion. However, in 1921 the building was commissioned to be a school and the first started in the yard of the mansion; this however was later transformed into a state-owned farm. The estate was returned to the Reichel's in 1989, who rebuilt it into a hotel and a restaurant.
