= HK Slovan Gelnica =

- City: Gelnica, Slovakia
- League: 2.Liga
- Founded: 1949
- Home arena: Zimný štadión Petra Bindasa (Capacity 3.500)
- Colors
- General manager: Zoltán Kolbaský
- Website: hkslovangelnica.sk/

Franchise history
- 1949: HK Gelnica
- 1960: TJ Slovan Gelnica
- 1994: HK Slovan Gelnica

HK Slovan Gelnica is an ice hockey team playing in the Slovak 2.Liga. They play in the city of Gelnica, Slovakia at Zimný štadión Petra Bindasa.
