= Comenius University =

Public university in Bratislava, Slovakia

Comenius University Bratislava
- Univerzita Komenského v Bratislave
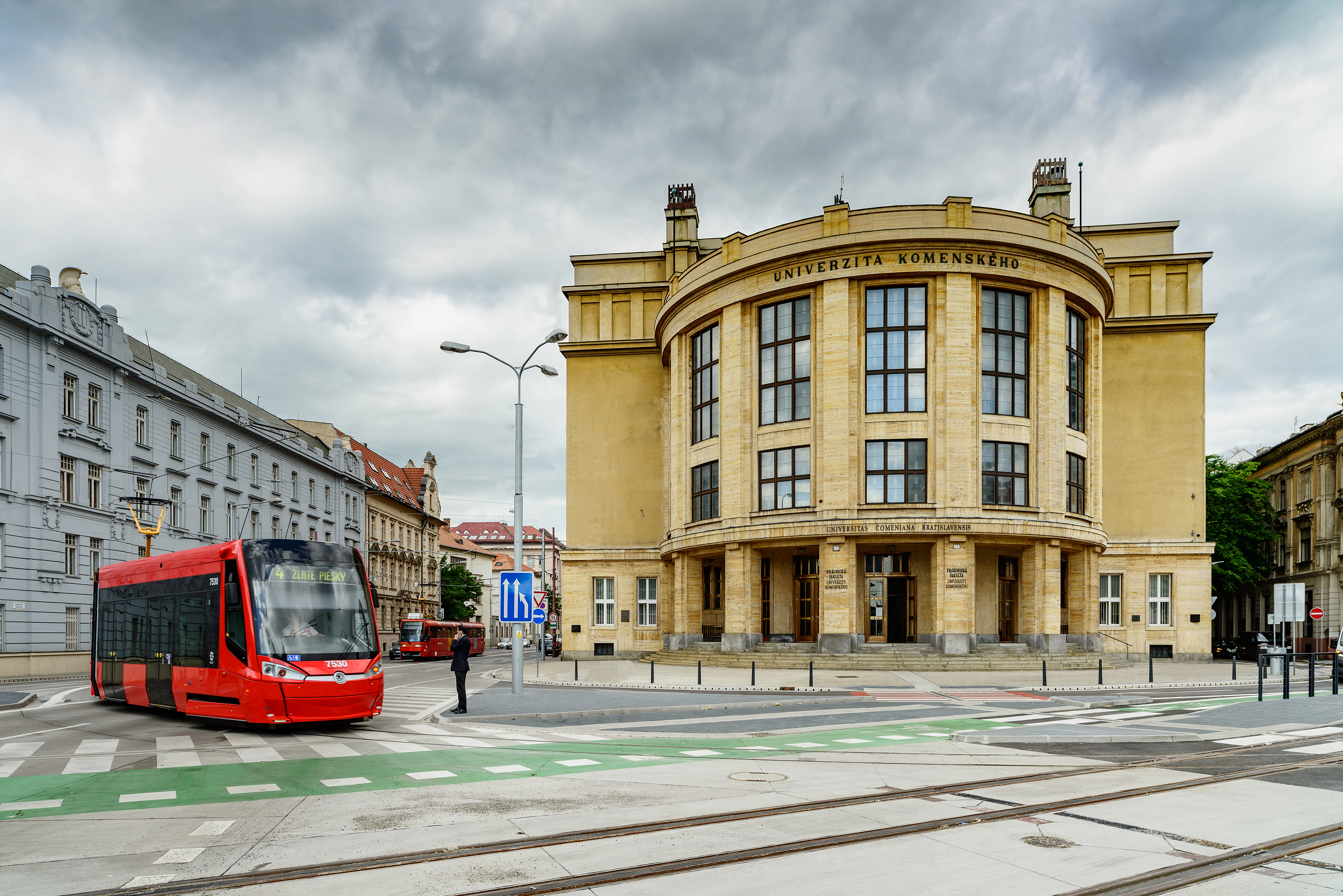
- Comenius University building in central Bratislava
- Latin: Universitas Comeniana Bratislavensis
- Former names: Bratislava University of Czechoslovakia; Slovak University
- Type: Public
- Established: 1919
- Academic affiliations: Erasmus, Utrecht Network
- Budget: € 185 million (2020)
- Rector: Marek Števček
- Faculty: 2,152 (2020–2021)
- Students: 22,817 (2020–2021)
- Undergraduates: 10,198 (2020–2021)
- Doctoral students: 1,884 (2020–2021)
- Location: Bratislava, Slovakia; 48°8′28.4″N 17°6′57.4″E
- Website: www.uniba.sk
- Location within Slovakia

University rankings

Global – Overall
- ARWU World: 901–1000 (2023)
- QS World: 771–780 (2024)
- THE World: 1001–1200 (2024)
- USNWR Global: =639 (2023)

Regional – Overall
- QS Emerging Europe and Central Asia: 58 (2022)

Comenius University Bratislava (Slovak: Univerzita Komenského v Bratislave) is the largest university in Slovakia, with most of its faculties located in Bratislava. It was founded in 1919, shortly after the creation of Czechoslovakia. It is named after Jan Amos Comenius, a 17th-century Czech teacher and philosopher.

In 2020, Comenius University had about 23,000 students and 2,500 faculty members. As are most universities in Slovakia, it is funded mostly by the government.

== History ==
The Comenius University was established in 1919 with assistance from the more established University of Prague. It was meant to replace the former Elisabeth University, which had been located in Bratislava since 1912, as the latter had been forcefully disbanded in 1919 by Samuel Zoch, plenipotentiary župan of Slovakia, after Hungarian professors refused to take an oath of allegiance at that time in the First Czechoslovak Republic. This had caused the majority of the university's professors (and some of the students) to take refuge in Budapest, where the Elisabeth University was re-established. It was later moved to Pécs and renamed to University of Pécs. This persecution of former (predominantly Hungarian) pillars of education in Bratislava necessitated the recruitment of Czech academicians. Therefore, many professors of the newly established university, including its first rector, Prof. MUDr. Kristian Hynek, were Czechs, since Slovakia at that time did not have enough educated Slovak speakers who could serve as faculty members. In spite of personnel, financial, and space difficulties, the university developed research and teaching programs. The Faculty of Medicine opened in 1919, and was quickly followed by the Faculties of Law and Philosophy in 1921. The Faculty of Philosophy, besides offering programs in the humanities and social sciences, also educated much-needed teachers for Slovakia's high schools.

In 1937, a new university building for the Faculties of Law and Philosophy was opened in the centre of Bratislava. The building includes the Aula (hall), used for graduation ceremonies and other formal functions.

During World War II, Slovakia became nominally a republic but was actually under the sway of Nazi Germany. The government reduced academic freedoms at the university, and the Czech professors were forced out. The university was renamed Slovak University in 1939, though the original name was reinstated in 1954. The Faculty of Science opened in 1940 and the Roman Catholic Faculty of Theology was established in 1941. Academic freedom returned after the end of the war in 1945 but was again cancelled in 1948 as the communists took power in Czechoslovakia, enforcing the ideology of Marxism-Leninism at Czechoslovak universities. The Roman Catholic Faculty of Theology was taken under direct control of the Ministry of Education.

However, the university continued to grow, and new faculties were established (mostly by splitting the existing faculties):

- Faculty of Education in 1946,
- Faculty of Pharmacy in 1952,
- Faculty of Physical Education and Sports in 1960,
- Faculty of Medicine in Martin in 1969,
- Faculty of Mathematics and Physics in 1980.

After the Velvet Revolution in 1989, the university created a democratic self-government, and mandatory courses on Marxist ideology were abolished. The Roman Catholic Faculty of Theology and the Evangelical Theological Faculty joined the university.

The transformation of Slovakia into a market economy created a need for professionals in management and financial sciences. As a result, the university established the Faculty of Management (1991) and the Faculty of Social and Economic Sciences (2002). In 2000, the European credit transfer system was implemented to improve student mobility and facilitate more ties with other European universities.

== List of faculties ==
This is a list of faculties of Comenius University in Bratislava with their official English names.

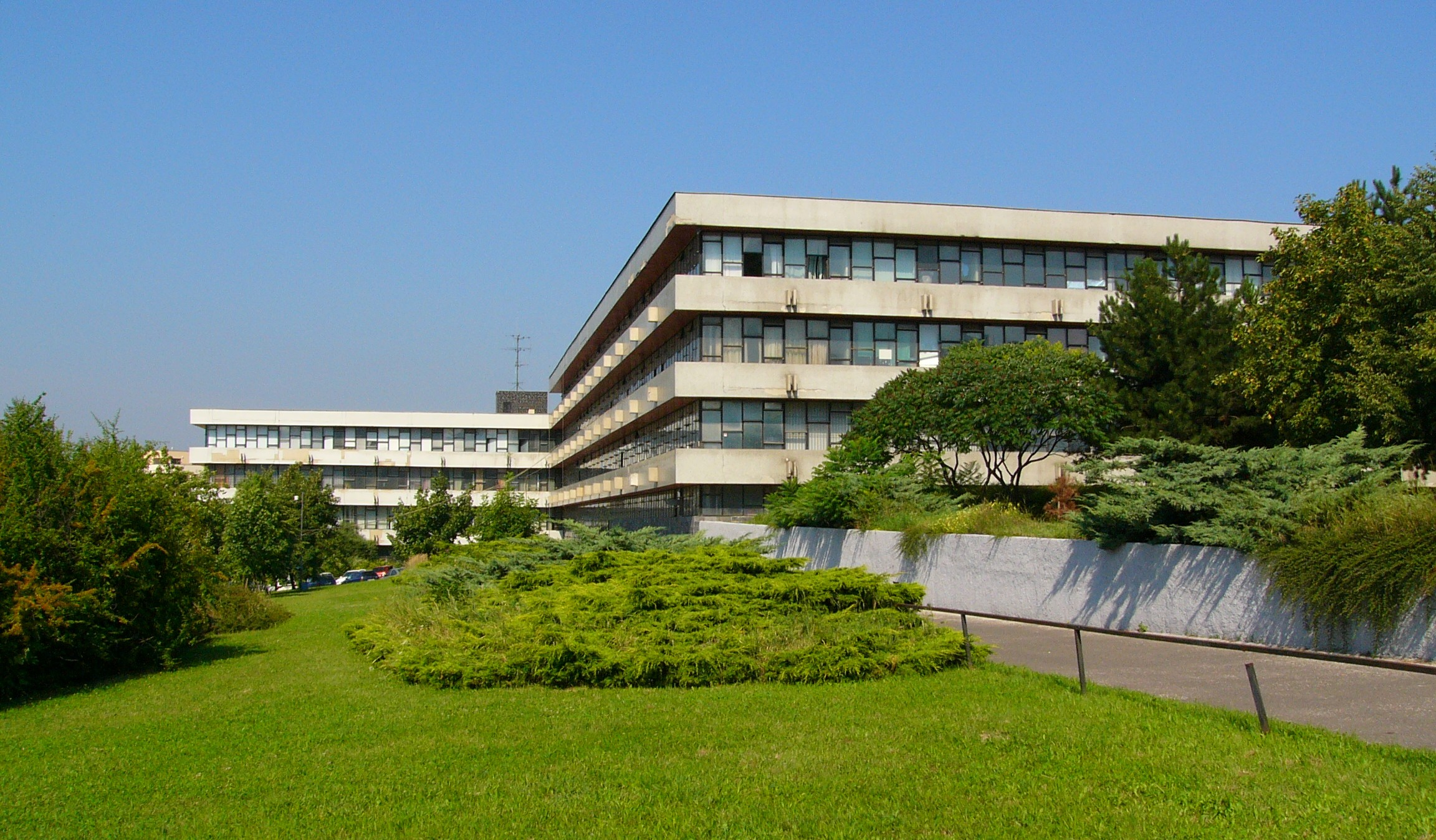
Building of the Faculty of Mathematics, Physics and Informatics, located in western part of Bratislava

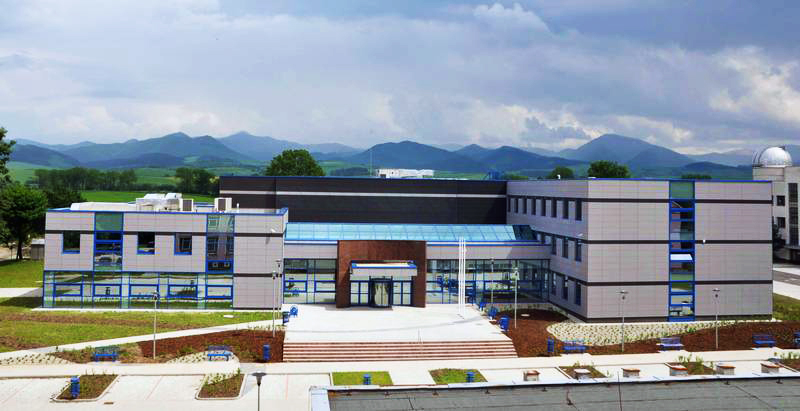
Jessenius Faculty of Medicine in Martin

- Faculty of Medicine
- Faculty of Law
- Faculty of Arts
- Faculty of Natural Sciences
- Faculty of Education
- Faculty of Pharmacy
- Faculty of Physical Education and Sport
- Jessenius Faculty of Medicine in Martin
- Faculty of Mathematics, Physics and Informatics
- Faculty of Roman Catholic Theology of Cyril and Methodius
- Evangelical Lutheran Theological Faculty
- Faculty of Management
- Faculty of Social and Economic Sciences

== Notable alumni ==
- Ľubomír Belák – singer, musician, composer and TV producer
- Emil Benčík – journalist and translator
- Zuzana Beňušková – ethnologist
- József Berényi – Chairman of the Party of the Hungarian Coalition
- Vladimír Fábry – lawyer and diplomat, personal secretary to Dag Hammarskjöld
- Robert Fico – politician, Prime minister of Slovakia
- Miroslav Jenča – diplomat and United Nations official
- Marja Holecyová - mathematician and fantasy writer
- Eva Kolníková – numismatist and archaeologist
- Rudolf Macúch – Protestant theologian and expert on Mandaean language and Samaritan language
- Zora Mintalová – Zubercová – ethnographer, historian and museologist
- Milan Mišík – geologist and university professor
- Vladimír Palko – former interior minister of Slovakia
- Ladislav Pataki – sports scientist, athletics coach, masters athletics champion
- Ester Plicková, ethnographer
- Julián Podoba – endocrinologist
- Tomáš Raček – actor and diplomat
- Iveta Radičová – former Prime minister of Slovakia
- Emire Khidayer – diplomat, entrepreneur and writer
- Ernest Valko – assassinated constitutional lawyer
- Ján Vilček – biomedical scientist, educator, inventor and philanthropist
- Štefan Znám – mathematician, first to ponder Znám's problem in modern mathematics
- Miroslav Lajcak – diplomat, President of the United Nations General Assembly for the 72nd session
- Zuzana Čaputová – politician, President of Slovakia
- Lukáš Plank – award-winning pathologist specializing in hematopathology.

== See also ==
- Utrecht Network
- Universitas Istropolitana
- Jessenius Faculty of Medicine in Martin
