= Martin, Slovakia =

Martin
- City
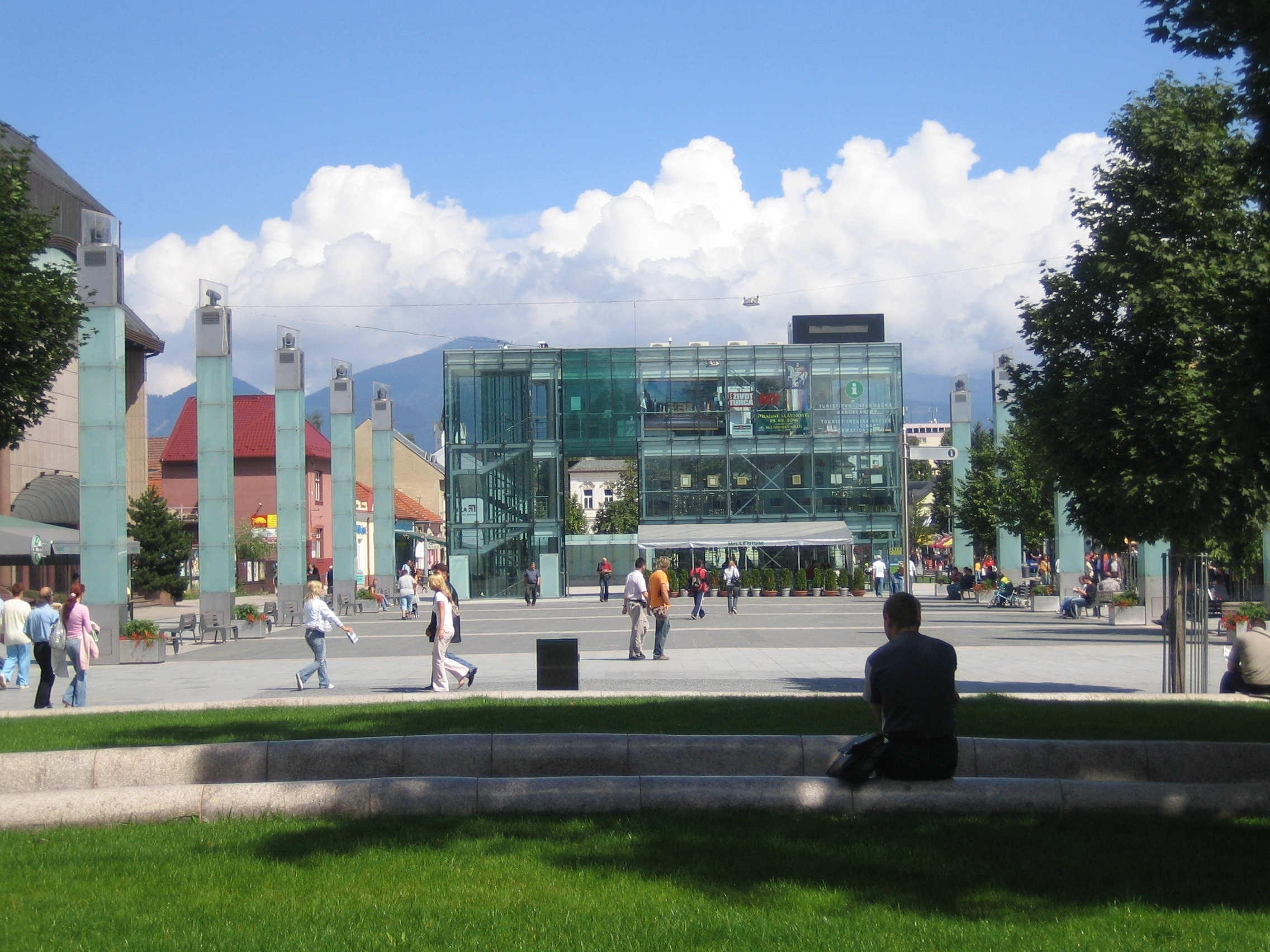
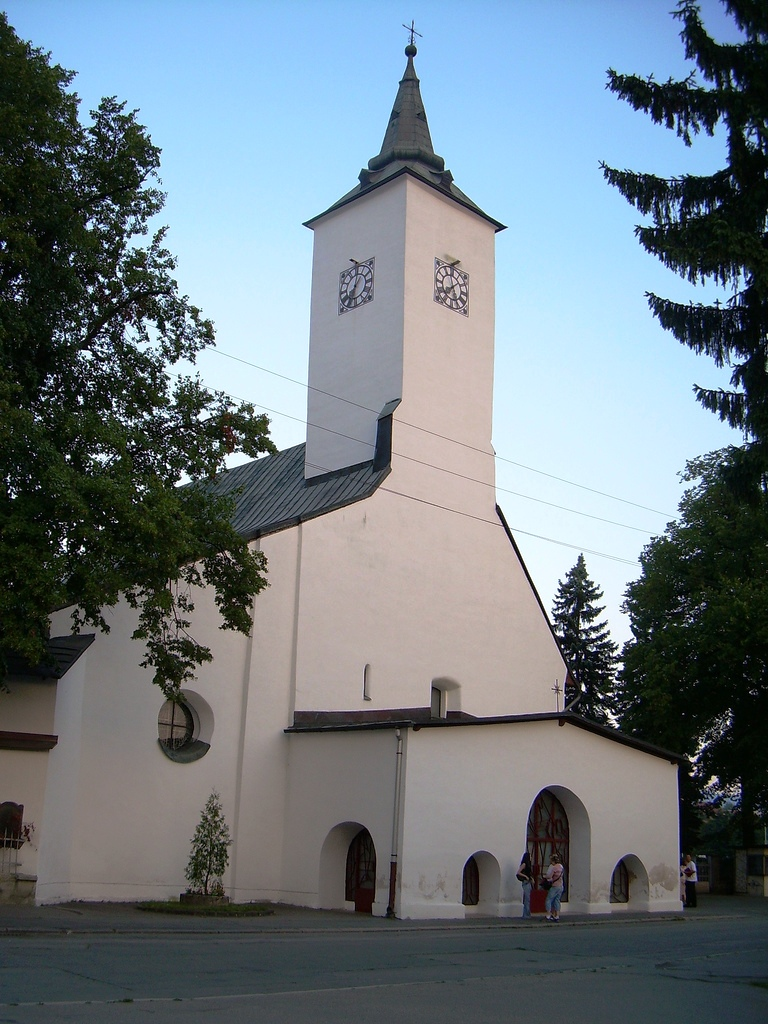
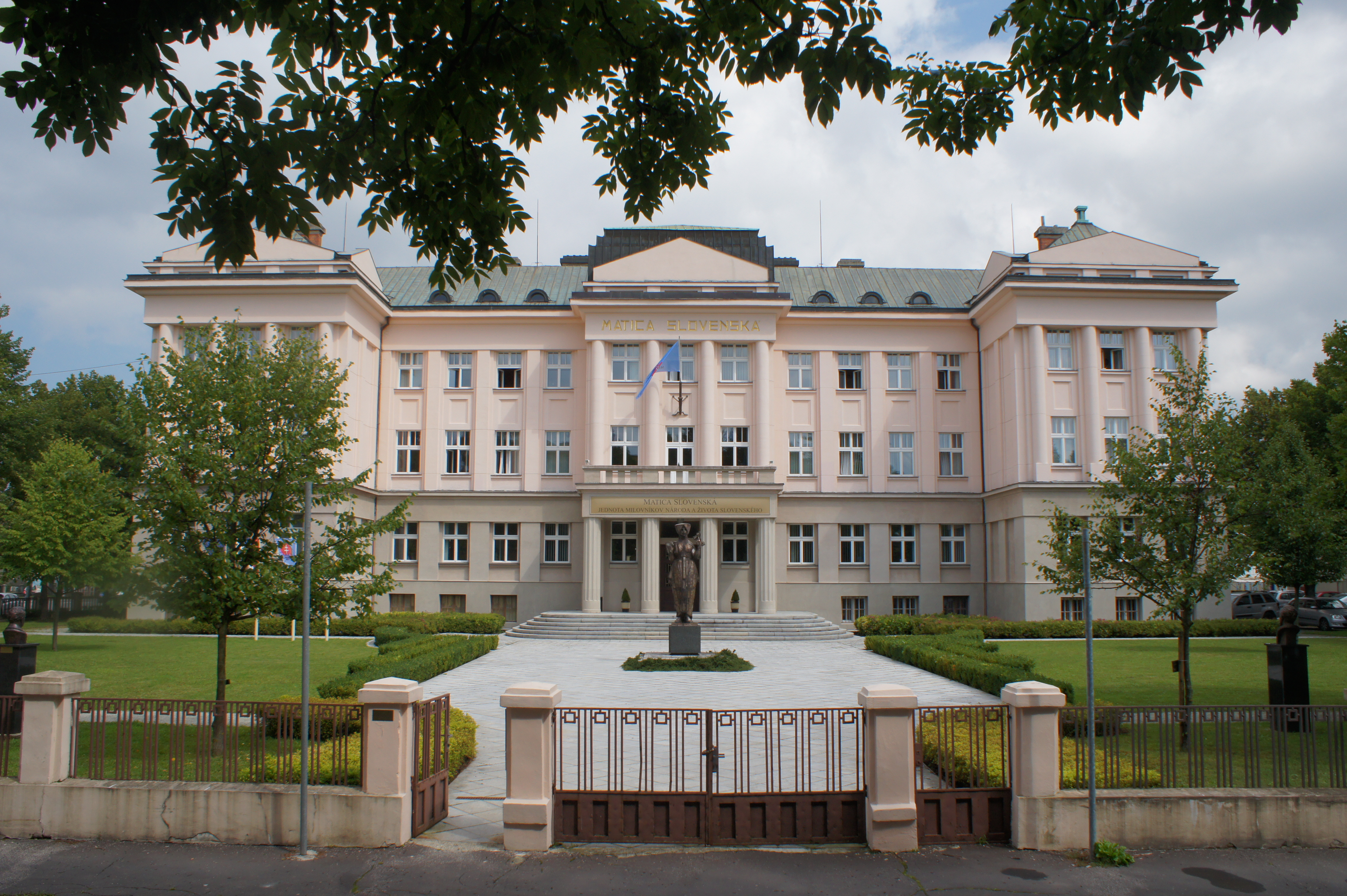
- From the top, City center of Martin, Church of Saint Martin, Matica Slovenská second building

- Flag Coat of arms
- Etymology: church dedicated to St. Martin
- Location in Slovakia Location in Žilina Region
- Coordinates: 49°03′54″N 18°55′19″E
- Country: Slovakia
- Region: Žilina
- District: Martin
- First mentioned: 1264

Government
  - Mayor: Ján Danko

Area
  - Total: 67.73 km^{2} (26.15 sq mi)
- (2022)
- Elevation: 402 m (1,319 ft)

Population (2025)
  - Total: 50,153
- Time zone: UTC+1 (CET)
  - Summer (DST): UTC+2 (CEST)
- Postal code: 036 01
- Area code: +421 43
- Vehicle registration plate (until 2022): MT
- Website: Official website

Martin (Slovak pronunciation: [ˈmartin]; until 1951 Turčiansky Svätý Martin, Hungarian: Turócszentmárton, German: Turz-Sankt Martin, Latin: Sanctus Martinus / Martinopolis) is a city in northern Slovakia, situated on the Turiec river, between the Malá Fatra and Veľká Fatra mountains, near the city of Žilina. The population numbers approximately 54,000, which makes it the ninth-largest city in Slovakia. It is the center of the Turiec region and the District of Martin.

== History ==
From the second half of the 10th century until 1918, it was part of the Kingdom of Hungary. The first recorded reference to Martin in written sources is dated to 1284 under the name of Vila Sancti Martini.

In the turbulent 15th century, Martin suffered from many disasters, for example, from the attack of the Hussites in 1433, when the town was burned down. Just ten years later, it was destroyed again by an earthquake, and Martin started to slowly degrade from royal to the privileged town and under the direct influence of the Révay family.

In the 18th century, Martin became the centre of the Turóc county.

The town became the foremost Slovak cultural center in the 19th century. Several cultural institutions (including Slovak Matica and Slovak National Museum) were founded there. Most political activities leading to the Slovak national emancipation in the 19th and early 20th centuries were organized in or from Martin. The town was also industrialized at this time. The first printing works were established in 1869, the furniture factory Tatra nábytok in 1890, and so on.

The town lost some of its importance after Pressburg (today's Bratislava) became the capital of Slovakia in 1919. Today, it is the seat of the Slovak National Library and Matica slovenská.

The National Council of the Slovak Republic declared the city of Martin the center of national culture of the Slovaks on 24 August 1994.

The city of Martin won the United Nations Public Service Award in 2011 in the category: Preventing and Combating Corruption in the Public Service.

== Geography ==
The municipality lies at an altitude of 402 metres (1,319 ft) and covers an area of 67.73 km^{2} (26.15 sq mi) (2025).

It is located in northern Slovakia, in the Turiec Basin, just south of the confluence of the Turiec river with Váh. Mountain ranges in the proximity of the city are Malá Fatra (Lesser Fatra) and Vel’ká Fatra (Greater Fatra); more to the south are the Žiar and Kremnica Mountains. The nearest major cities are Žilina, 30 kilometres (19 mi) away to the north-west, Banská Bystrica, 60 kilometres (37 mi) away to the south-east and capital Bratislava, 230 kilometres (143 mi) to the south-west (by road). Martin has 10 boroughs: Jahodníky, Ľadoveň, Stred, Sever, Košúty, Podháj, Stráne, Priekopa, Tomčany, and Záturčie.

=== Climate ===
Martin lies in the north temperate zone and has a continental climate with four distinct seasons. It is characterized by a significant variation between hot summers and cold, snowy winters. Average annual temperature is around 7 °C (45 °F) and average annual rainfall is 750–860 mm (29.5–33.9 in); most of the rainfall is in June and in the first half of July. Snow cover lasts from 60 to 80 days per year.

Climate data for Martin
Month	Jan	Feb	Mar	Apr	May	Jun	Jul	Aug	Sep	Oct	Nov	Dec	Year
Mean daily maximum °C (°F)	0 (33)	3 (38)	8 (47)	14 (58)	20 (68)	22 (72)	25 (76)	25 (77)	20 (67)	14 (58)	6 (44)	1 (35)	13 (56)
Mean daily minimum °C (°F)	−5 (22)	−5 (23)	−1 (30)	3 (37)	8 (46)	10 (51)	12 (54)	12 (53)	9 (47)	5 (41)	0 (33)	−4 (26)	4 (39)
Average precipitation cm (inches)	2.85 (1.12)	2.67 (1.05)	3.10 (1.22)	4.08 (1.61)	4.82 (1.90)	6.99 (2.75)	6.84 (2.69)	5.19 (2.04)	4.74 (1.87)	4.19 (1.65)	3.91 (1.54)	3.42 (1.35)	52.8 (20.79)
Source: MSN Weather

== Population ==
Historical population
Year	Pop.	±%
1970	37,415	—
1980	47,475	+26.9%
1991	58,393	+23.0%
2001	60,133	+3.0%
2011	57,428	−4.5%
2021	52,520	−8.5%
Source: Censuses

Population statistic (10 years)
Year	1995	2005	2015	2025
Count	60,772	59,257	55,687	50,153
Difference		−2.49%	−6.02%	−9.93%

Population statistic
Year	2024	2025
Count	50,346	50,153
Difference		−0.38%

Martin has a population of 50,153 (as of 31 December, 2025). Since the end of the 1990s, when the population reached its top (more than 60,000), every year a slight decrease has been observed.

=== Ethnicity ===
Census 2021 (1+ %)
Ethnicity	Number	Fraction
Slovak	48,697	92.72%
Not found out	3118	5.93%
Czech	800	1.52%
Total	52,520	

In year 2021 was 52,520 people by ethnicity 48,697 as Slovak, 3118 as Not found out, 800 as Czech, 283 as Other, 279 as Romani, 144 as Hungarian, 107 as Rusyn, 90 as Russian, 69 as German, 45 as Polish, 36 as Moravian, 29 as Ukrainian, 25 as Vietnamese, 21 as Bulgarian, 18 as Jewish, 17 as Chinese, 17 as Italian, 15 as Serbian, 14 as Iranian, 13 as Irish, 12 as Croatian, 11 as Romanian, 10 as Canadian, 10 as English, 9 as Turkish, 8 as Austrian, 8 as French, 2 as Silesian, 2 as Greek, 2 as Albanian and 1 as Korean.

Note on population: The difference values of population numbers in the table "Population statistic" and in the sections "Ethnicity" & "Religion" is caused by the use of various statistical methods.

=== Religion ===
Census 2021 (1+ %)
Religion	Number	Fraction
None	22,897	43.6%
Roman Catholic Church	16,452	31.33%
Evangelical Church	6574	12.52%
Not found out	4674	8.9%
Total	52,520	

In year 2021 was 52,520 people by religion 22,897 from None, 16,452 from Roman Catholic Church, 6574 from Evangelical Church, 4674 from Not found out, 446 from Greek Catholic Church, 212 from Ad hoc movements, 201 from Other and not ascertained christian church, 196 from Other, 137 from Christian Congregations in Slovakia, 107 from Jehovah's Witnesses, 99 from Eastern Orthodox Church, 84 from Islam, 71 from Buddhism, 69 from Paganism and natural spirituality, 69 from United Methodist Church, 55 from Seventh-day Adventist Church, 49 from Apostolic Church, 32 from Czechoslovak Hussite Church, 30 from Calvinist Church, 25 from Hinduism, 17 from Jewish community, 15 from Old Catholic Church, 6 from Church of the Brethren, 2 from Church of Jesus Christ of Latter-day Saints and 1 from Bahá'i Community.

== Sights ==
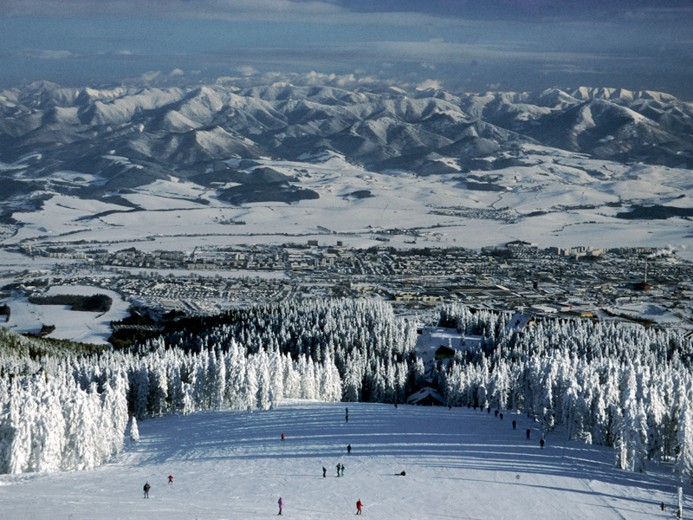
Martin (east view) and Veľká Fatra.

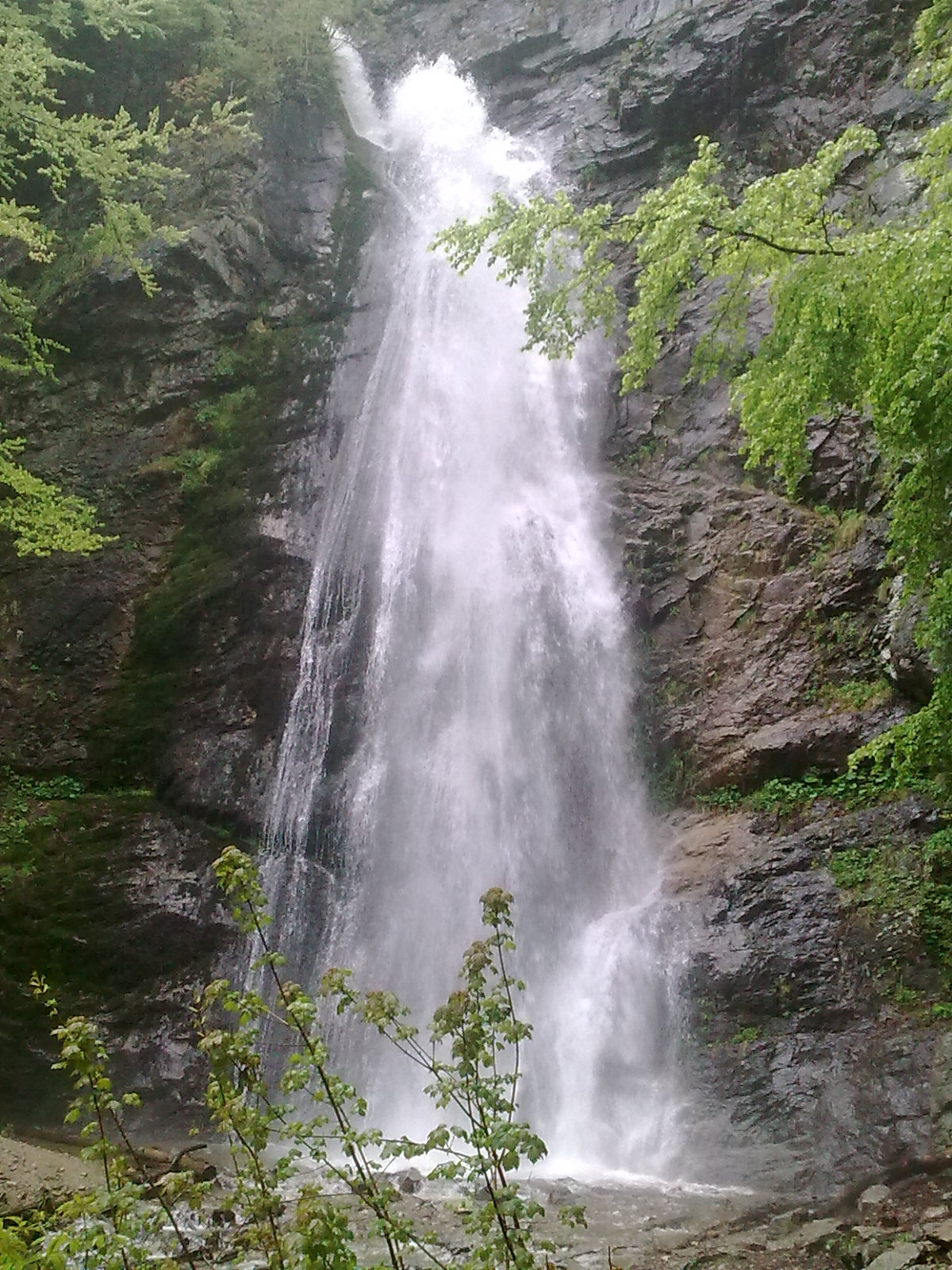
The tallest waterfall (38 m) in Malá Fatra near Martin

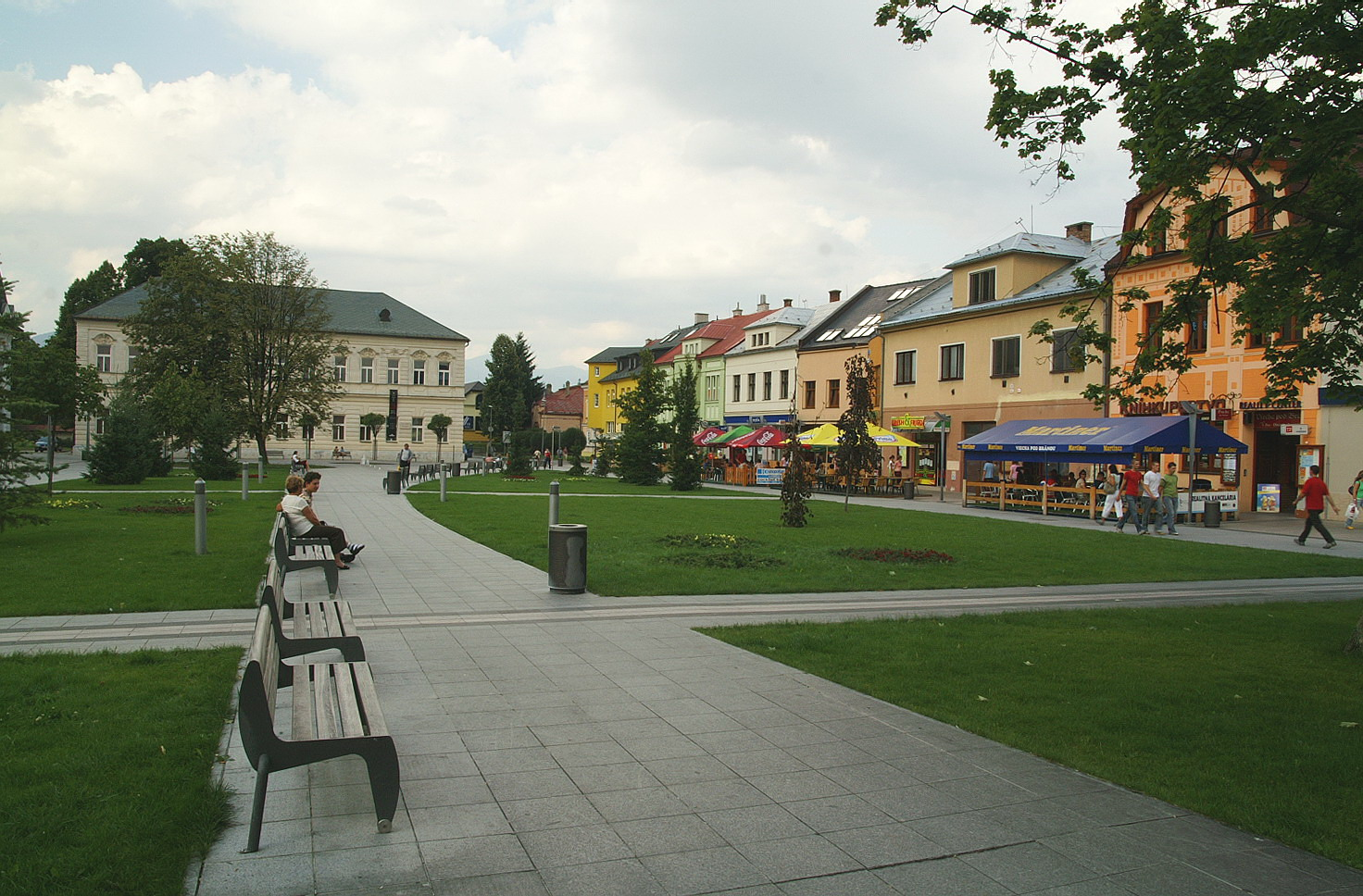
City centre of Martin

The oldest building is a Romanesque church dedicated to Saint Martin of Tours (13th century). The Slovak National Museum placed its ethnographic collection in Martin. An open-air museum in the suburbs, the Museum of the Slovak Village (Jahodnícke háje), exhibits the traditional rural architecture and folk traditions of the region of Turiec. The Slovak National Cemetery is the official Slovak hall of fame, inspired by the Panthéon in Paris. The Slovak Chamber Theatre in Martin was established in 1944 as the second professional theatre company in Slovakia. The theatre building is a landmark of the city center.

Martin is surrounded by Malá Fatra and Veľká Fatra mountains, which in winter offer excellent conditions for skiing.

There is a historic mansion in the town of Záturčie in the Martin district.

== Economy ==
Martin is home to a Volkswagen Group-owned automotive industry production plant, under the Volkswagen Slovakia, a.s. subsidiary. Opened in 2000, it employs approximately 800 people. The city was hit hard in 2008 by the recession, as Volkswagen was forced to lay off over 200 workers. Other major industrial companies include ŽOS Vrútky (rail vehicles industry) or Prefa Sučany (concrete prefabricates).

The Danish shoe company ECCO is located near the Kosuty II borough in an industrial park. This park also hosts other companies such as MAR SK, GGB, and Zinkpower.

The university hospital employs approximately two thousand personnel: doctors, nurses, and other staff. The printing company Neografia has clients in more than 15 European countries, where Neografia exports the decisive part of its production of books. Due to the economic crisis, the unemployment rate rose to 10%, but was still below the national average rate. In March 2018, the unemployment rate was under 4%. Many inhabitants work in the nearby town Žilina, which is an important industrial center and a major city of the region.

== Education ==
Martin is home to the Jessenius Faculty of Medicine, which is one of three medical schools in Slovakia. Among its international students are up to 500 Norwegian and 100 Icelandic medical students.

The city's system of primary education consists of nine public schools, two private primary schools (BellAmos School), and two religious primary schools, enrolling in total of 5,027 pupils. There is a plan to build a five-story high school near the main square. When completed, it will be the largest educational building in Slovakia apart from universities. The school will be named after Andrej Hlinka, a former Slovak politician.

Secondary education is represented by two gymnasia with 828 students, three specialized high schools with 1,050 students (Business Academy Martin), and three vocational schools with 2,501 students (data as of 2007).

== Sport ==
The division, the Handball 1st league.

== Transport ==
Martin lies on the crossroad that interconnects the main road (as well main railway) from Bratislava to Košice with Banská Bystrica. It is connected directly to Žilina, Turčianske Teplice and Ružomberok.

Public transport is not only in Martin itself, but it also extends to the surrounding town of Vrútky and to three villages (Bystrička, Lipovec, Turčianske Kľačany).

Martin is also served by Martin Airport, a small, general aviation airport used for gliding.

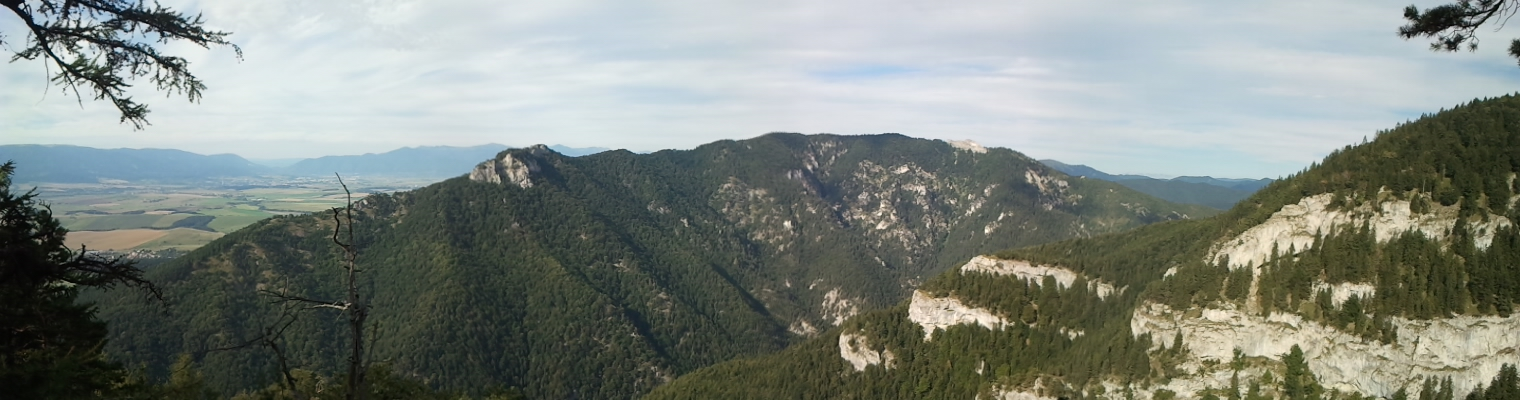
Gader Valley with Martin in the background

== Twin towns – sister cities ==
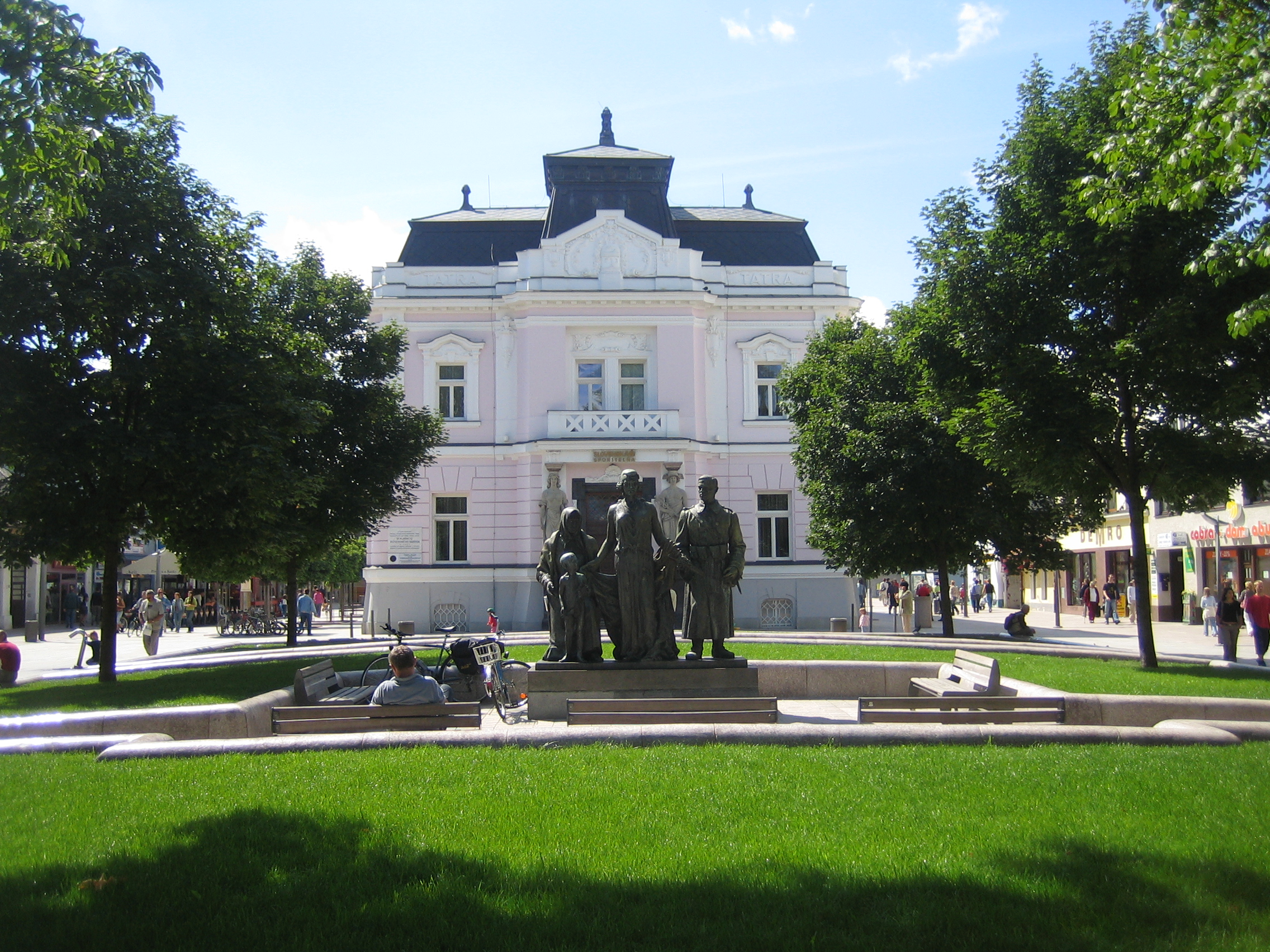
City centre

Martin is twinned with:

- Bački Petrovac, Serbia
- Balashikha, Russia
- Békéscsaba, Hungary
- Fargo, United States
- Gotha, Germany
- Hoogeveen, Netherlands
- Jičín, Czech Republic
- Kalisz, Poland

== Notable people ==
- Janko Alexy (1894–1970), painter
- Miloš Alexander Bazovský (1899–1968), painter
- Peter Bartoš (born 1973), ice hockey player
- Martin Benka (1888–1971), painter
- Barbora Bobuľová (born 1974), actress
- Tomáš Brcko (born 1988), ice hockey player
- Zdeno Cíger (born 1969), ice hockey player
- Oľga Feldeková (1943–2025), writer
- Laura Frličková (born 2007), track and field athlete
- Viera Gašparíková (1928–2023), folklorist and Slavist
- Oto Haščák (born 1964), ice hockey player
- Janko Jesenský, writer
- Jaroslav Katriňák, endurance motorcycle racer
- Dušan Kaprálik (1948–2023), actor
- Jana Kirschner (born 1978), pop singer
- Lucia Klocová (born 1983), middle-distance runner
- Andrej Kmeť (1841–1908), scientist
- Ľuboš Kostelný (born 1981), actor
- Hana Meličková (1900–1978), actress
- Zora Mintalová-Zubercová (born 1950), ethnographer, historian and museologist
- Anton Neuwirth, presidential candidate, ambassador
- Martin Obuch, ice hockey player
- Richard Pánik, ice hockey player
- Lukáš Plank, pathologist
- Miloslav Schmidt, organizer of fire brigades
- Róbert Švehla, ice hockey player
- Radovan Somík, ice hockey player
- Peter Smrek, ice hockey player
- Pavol Steiner (1908–1969), water polo player, swimmer and cardiac surgeon
- Ján Tabaček (born 1980), ice hockey player
- Andrea Turčanová (born 1966), politician
- Petra Vajdová (born 1985), actress
- Ladislav Záborský (1921–2016), painter; lived and died here
