= Jessenius Faculty of Medicine =

Medical school in Slovakia

Jessenius Faculty of Medicine, Comenius University
- Jessenius Med Logo Latin: Facultas Medica Jesseniana
- Motto: Improve health through leadership, discoveries, and innovation
- Type: Public
- Established: 1969
- Parent institution: Comenius University of Bratislava
- Dean: Prof. Andrea Čalkovská, M.D., DSc.
- Academic staff: 247
- Students: 1846
- Doctoral students: 203
- Location: Martin,Slovakia; 49.0667°N 18.9307°E
- Campus: Urban
- Colors: Auburn and Red
- Website: www.jfmed.unika.sk

The Jessenius Faculty of Medicine (Slovak: Jesseniova lekárska fakulta) is a medical school of Comenius University located in Martin, Slovakia. It is one of the thirteen faculties of the university, and is the only faculty that is not located in Bratislava.

Jessenius has consistently been Slovakia's number one medical school according to the Slovak University Ranking and Rating Association and is ranked as one of the top medical schools in Central Europe. Its major teaching hospital, the Martin University Hospital, has constantly been ranked among the best hospitals in Slovakia; as of 2011, it is ranked second. Along with its Slovak-taught programs, the school also offers a 6-year English-language program in medicine leading to the title Doctor of Medicine (M.D., international title), PhD programs in medicine and odontology and several master's degree programs in nursing and public health.

Since 2001, the school has published the scholarly journal Acta Medica Martiniana (AMM) as a successor to Folia Medica Martiniana, which was published intermittently from 1971 to 1996. AMM is published periodically with three issues per year in English and publishes original research papers, as well as review articles in both medical and biomedical sciences as well as nursing.

Jessenius also headquarters three National Centers of Excellence, funded through the Science and Research program of the EU, which are cutting-edge institutions for perinatology and pulmonology research (both basic science and clinical) and emphasizes medical innovation, novel methods, discoveries, and innovations. The current dean of the medical school is Andrea Čalkovská, a professor of physiology, who succeeded gynecologist Ján Danko in 2018.

== History ==
=== Origins ===
The history of graduate training for medical students in Martin dates back as 1962, to the times of Communist Czechoslovakia, when a detached workplace of the Faculty of Medicine of Comenius University in Bratislava was set up at the Martin hospital, which was by then a prominent center of graduate training for doctors. The first group of included 112 4th-year students, mostly from Bratislava and Košice, who began studying in the 1962/1963 academic year. The first graduation ceremony was held in 1965. However, it was not until 1967 that complete training in general medicine started. On 6 June 1969 the Faculty of Medicine with the seat in Martin (Slovak: Lekárska fakulta v Martine) was officially established as the eighth faculty and the second Faculty of Medicine of Comenius University.

=== After 1989 ===
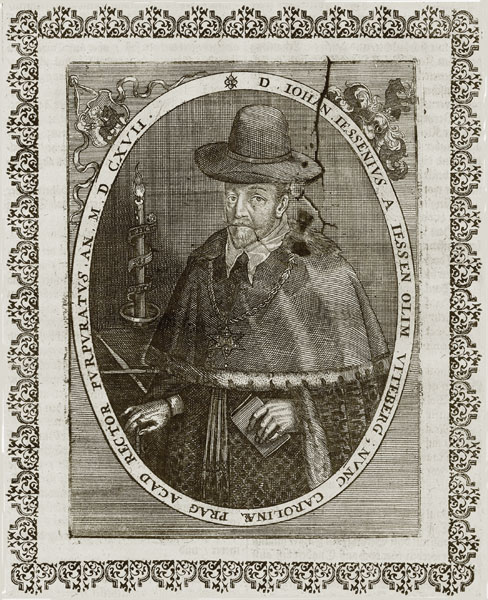
Ján Jessenius (1617)

Another chapter in the school's history started with the Velvet Revolution and the fall of communism (1989), in which the student movement played a major role. The faculty gained democratic self-government, an academic senate was established (today the senate has 35 members, of which 23 are faculty employees and 12 are students), and compulsory classes in Marxist ideology were abolished. Based on a decision by the Academic Senate in 1991, the faculty was renamed the Jessenius Faculty of Medicine in honor of Renaissance physician and humanist Jan Jessenius (1566–1621), the chancellor of the Charles University in Prague, whose ancestors had their roots in the district of Martin.

Around the same time, in 1991, the faculty, as the first medical faculty in Slovakia, opened enrollment to international students (who pay tuition). General medical education for these students is provided in English.

Currently JFM offers education, research, treatment, and prevention at fourteen research and clinical institutes, twenty-seven clinics, and four institutes. The current new assembly hall that houses the dean's office was completed in July 2010. In September 2012, due to an acute shortage of dentists in Slovakia, Jessenius first began offering programs for odontology students, with six students starting that autumn.

Over the last 30 years there have been more than 4,000 graduates, not only from Slovakia but also from across Europe, Africa, Asia, and America. Today, there are students from more than 20 countries, mainly from Scandinavia (especially Norway) and the United States, studying general medicine at the faculty.

== Campus ==
=== Main campus ===
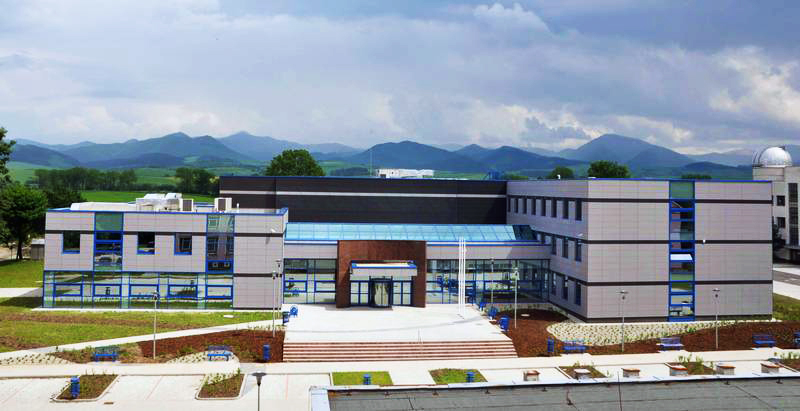
Assembly Hall

The school's campus is located on Small Hill (Slovak: Malá Hora) and consists of four separate buildings. The historical M. R. Štefánik building is home to the three National Centres of Excellence, the school's nursing academy, and is also used for the teaching of Latin for first year medical students.

The main building headquarters many of the pre-clinical medical departments, such as anatomy, histology, embryology, biophysics and medical biology. The assembly hall houses the dean's office and the aula magna, which itself is used for conferences, graduations, inaugurations, matriculation, and other events. The campus houses also the building of the newly constructed Medical Simulation Center, which is part of the schools IKT medical platform. The Medical Simulation Center is also a library, whose reading dorms are heavily frequented by medical students. The school's departments also use other facilities for research; this is enabled through the school's contract with the Martin University Hospital, which serves as its teaching hospital for medical students from the third year upwards.

In 2013 the Jessenius Faculty started its single largest construction project in history, constructing a 27 million euro Center for Biomedical Research called BioMed Martin, which specializes in neurosciences, molecular medicine and pulmonology. The center is located adjacent to the Aula Magna and is mainly a research facility, but also houses many departments with laboratories for the teaching of preclinical and paraclinical subjects such as pathophysiology, medical chemistry, biochemistry, physiology, immunology, microbiology, etc. The center was fully operational by the end of 2015.

There are two main campus residential halls: the Big Hostel (Slovak: Veľký internát), which has historically housed Slovak students, and the Little Hostel (Slovak: Malý internát) which is more associated with foreign students. There are also an on-campus apartment-style residence hall called Faculty House, which is available for both students and faculty.

=== Slovak National Library ===
The Slovak National Library (Slovak: Slovenská národná knižnica) is the national library of Slovakia. It is the oldest, largest, and most prominent national and research library in Slovakia. Nearly 190 years old, it is tasked with documenting the past and present intellectual and material development of the Slovak nation, as well as being the custodian of the treasures of Slovak national culture.

It is located adjacent to the school campus between the Little Hill and the Big Hostel, and its large reading halls are heavily frequented by medical students. It is associated with the Slovak Cultural Institute (Slovak: Matica Slovenská). The institute itself is located in the town center.

== Academics ==
=== Admission ===
The Jessenius Faculty of Medicine maintains a highly selective admission standard for its undergraduate programs. Applicants must have completed their secondary school education with good grades, reached the age of 17 or more, and must show solid knowledge of biology and chemistry through a 160 question entrance examination that can be undergone once a year. In addition to passing the entrance examination, an extensive list of documentation must be submitted for the student to be eligible for admission, including the secondary school certificate, motivational letter, the curriculum vitae, etc. Having recommendation letters is also a good thing. The international students must also show a good comprehension of the English language before applying, and are taught Slovak after admission. The final decision regarding admission to the medical school is based on performance on the entrance examination, high school grades, references, etc. The school's admission rate for medical students in 2013 was 8.03% of all qualified applicants.

=== Academic year ===
The academic year is divided into two semesters, determined by a regulation, with six-week examination periods scheduled at the end of each semester. The fall semester lasts from early September to mid-December, and the spring semester lasts from early February to late May. Within these semesters, undergraduate teaching takes place. After each academic year, usually at the end of August, there is a second exam period for students that failed or otherwise postponed exams during the exam period. The medical students are also expected to study and prepare for the next semester during the holiday periods (Christmas and summer). Failing to pass an exam after three tries results in the student being expelled from the school.

The main examination form is usually oral, but especially during the first three years most subjects end in a final exam composed of either a written or a practical exam that has to be passed to continue to the final oral examination. The most extensive exam is the final anatomy exam which marks the end of three semesters of anatomy. It includes a written exam that has to be passed to continue to the practical dissection exam, which then has to be passed to undertake the final oral examination. The minimum to pass the written exams is usually between 60-70%.

In addition to the exams and especially during the first three years of medical school, the school operates with frequent testing of the student's knowledge in all subjects through credit tests (2-5 per subject per semester) in all subjects and weekly seminar tests in given subjects to ensure that the students are up to speed. During these years, the students typically have 5-6 subjects per semester. The students are given three tries on each test, and failing to pass results in the student being expelled from the school.

=== International co-operation ===
In addition to actively taking part in Europe's leading mobility initiative, the ERASMUS programme; JFM has extensive international cooperation relations with various universities and institutes around the globe (e.g., Taipei Medical University in Taiwan, the University of Florida College of Medicine in the U.S., the Faculty of Medicine at the Norwegian University of Science and Technology, the School of Medical Sciences at the University of Adelaide in Australia, etc.). As of 2013, the school had more than 600 international students from 14 different countries(e.g. Norway, Sweden, Iceland, Portugal, Germany, UK). Among the students there is a sizable community of some 500 Norwegian students, because in recent years the school has emerged as one of the most popular study destinations for international students from Norway.

== Research ==
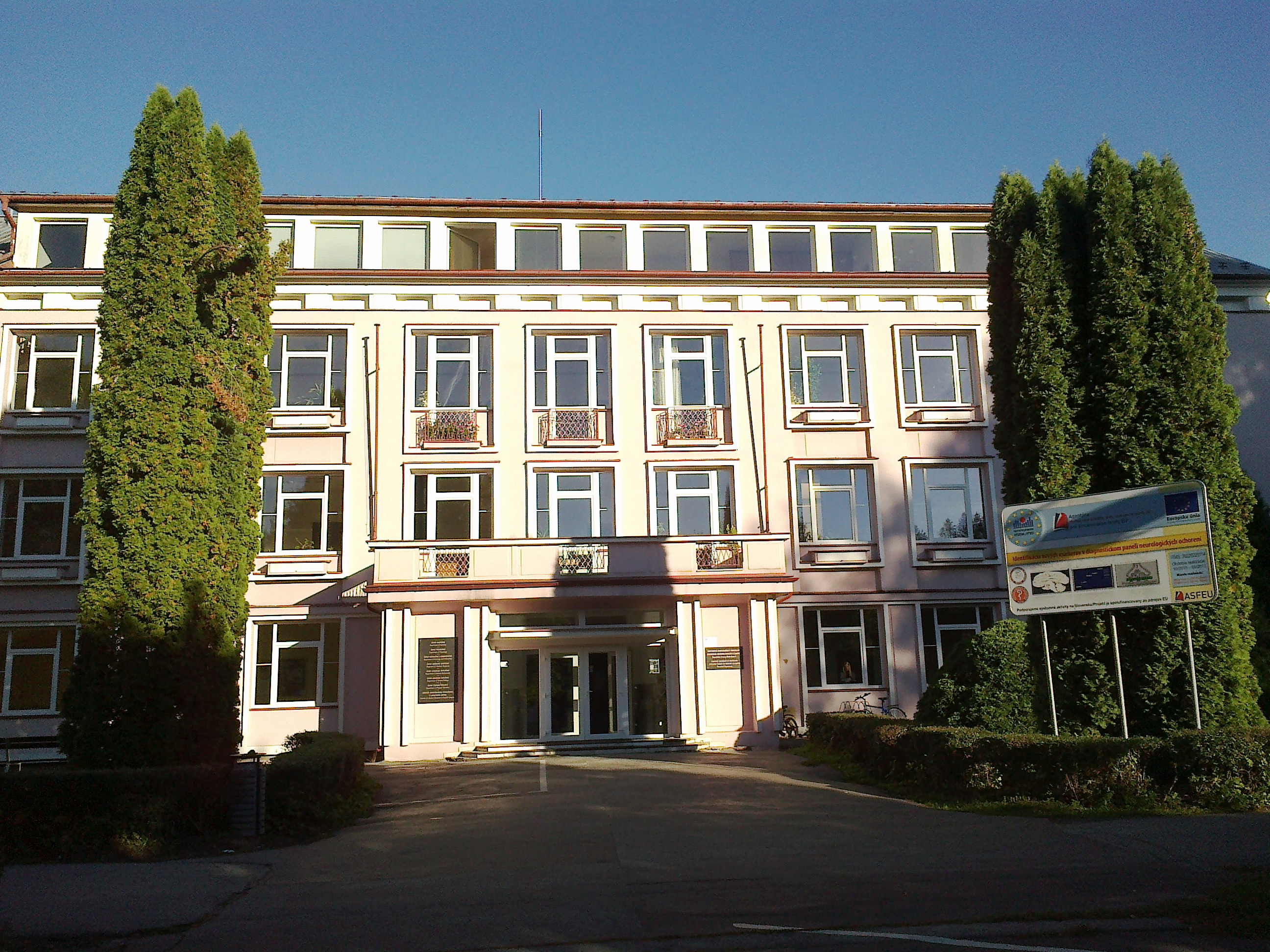
Main Building

Research activities at JFM continue to provide material and technical workstations as well as personal development, improving the quality of the teaching staff and increasing their qualifications, and are therefore crucial for the development of the faculty as a whole. The school is gradually profiling itself through six major research areas: the respiratory system in health and disease, diseases of the central and peripheral nervous system related to care for mothers and children, malignant cancers, selected internal disorders, and the working environments' adverse effect on the human health.

Research in these areas involved a significant portion of the human and economic capacity at JFM and significantly contributes to the results of its research activities. Through the fulfillment of certain criteria, the university clinics and institutes (Obstetrics and Gynaecology, Department for Children and Adolescents, Department of Pharmacology, Institute of Physiology, Institute of Medical Biochemistry, Department of Pathology, and Department of Pathophysiology) have become the leading research institutes of the Comenius University.

=== BioMed Martin ===
In 2013, the Jessenius Faculty started its single largest construction project in history, constructing a 27 million euro Center for Biomedical Research called BioMed Martin, which specializes in neurosciences, molecular medicine and pulmonology, the center was fully operational by the end of 2015.

=== Centers of Excellence ===
At the JFM there are currently three Centers of Excellence. Two arose in early 2009: the Center of Excellence for Perinatology Research (CEPV) and the Center for Experimental and Clinical Respirology (CEKR). A third center was established in September 2010: the Center of Excellence for Research in Personalized Therapy (CEVYPET). Centers of Excellence are focused primarily on basic research in the medical sciences.

=== Centre of Palliative Care of Bjørnstjerne Bjørnson ===
The Centre of Palliative Care of Bjørnstjerne Bjornson was established in 2012 as a joined initiative of Prof. Kjell Erik Strømskag, MD, PhD. from the Faculty of Health Sciences at the Molde University College in Norway and the Institute of Nursing at the Jessenius Faculty of Medicine. It conducts research in the field of palliative care but also offers educational programs and training for nurses, caregivers and volunteers caring for dying patients. The Centre maintains a rich international cooperation wit other Institutions focused on palliative care such as the Centre for Palliative Care at the University of Melbourne in Australia, European Palliative Care Research Centre in Trondheim and others.

=== Publications ===
During the entire existence of the school, the total number of published material stands at 17,400 publications and 17,991 citations (2,913 cited documents). The quality of research, and also the work of the faculty, is reflected by the official Slovak academic rating agency (ARRA), which has continuously rated the Jessenius Faculty of Medicine as the best medical school in Slovakia.

== Student life and traditions ==
Student life and campus culture at Jessenius Faculty of Medicine are highly diverse and are influenced both by the native Slovak student population and also by the large community of foreign students. Annual events celebrate the school's traditions, culture, and sports.

=== Student unions ===
The Martin Group of Medical Students (Slovak: Martinský klub medikov, abbreviated MKM) is the interest association of Slovak students at JFM, which helps ensure a full social life and intellectual development of students on the basis of culture, special interests, sports, and science. Involved in providing lectures, seminars, discussions, cultural, social, and sports events, exhibitions, and so on, MKM organizes professional clinical practice, and domestic and foreign student exchange programs. The group also cooperates with other professional organizations in Slovakia and abroad. The students issue their own magazine called Omphalus Martinensis.

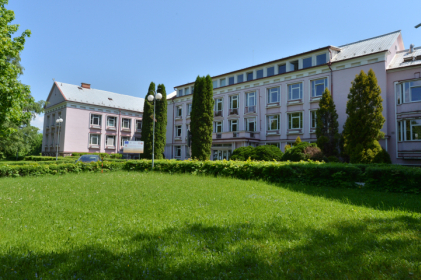
Theoretical departments building

The Norwegian students are organized in the Association of Norwegian Students Abroad, abbreviated ANSA, through their Slovakia chapter (ANSA Slovakia), and their local chapter (ANSA Martin). Additionally all foreign students are represented through the Foreign Student Council, a body that helps represent the interests of international students.

=== Events ===
Every fall semester, a modern variant of the medieval central European tradition of deposition (Slovak: Beánie) is held. During these festivities, both students and faculty celebrate the matriculation of the new first-year students. In September, second-year students also celebrate with a traditional party to mark the end of the second and most challenging "dissection week", a week dedicated to extensive anatomical dissections and tests. Another Slovak tradition is the celebration called Lamavica, which is held every year. The party is a celebration for all fourth-year students to mark that they are halfway through their studies.

Every December, the Association of Norwegian Students hosts a traditional Scandinavian Julebord banquet for all students. This increasingly popular Christmas tradition includes a dinner, speeches, awards, and charity fund-raising. Another important tradition that originates in Slovak folk culture is the raising of the Maypole (Slovak: Máj) before May 1. According to the tradition, a tree with colorful ribbons is put up in front of houses of single young women. In modern times, Slovak students raise the symbolic tree in honor of the female students at the school, sing folksongs, and dance folk dances in traditional costumes.

=== Athletics ===
The Jessenius Faculty of Medicine hosts several private non-affiliated sports teams, including the HK Slávia Medik women's handball team. The club, which was promoted after the 2011/2012 season, currently plays in the 2nd tier of the league system, and consists solely of female students at JFM. In addition, the students have organized teams in football, ultimate, volleyball, field hockey, basketball and road cycling. Every year in late March, there is the traditional ANSA JFMED Indoor Football Tournament, where every year of students forms ad-hoc teams and competes against each other in indoor football.

== See also ==
- Comenius University
