= Kalnik =

Kalnik may refer to:

- Kalnik (mountain), a mountain in Croatia
- Kalnik, Koprivnica-Križevci County, a municipality in Croatia
- Dolný Kalník, a village in Slovakia
- Horný Kalník, a village in Slovakia
- Kalnik (river), a river in Bulgaria, tributary of Vit
- Kalnik, North Macedonia, a village in Bogovinje Municipality, Macedonia
- Kalnik, an alternative name for Kuzmyno, a village in Ukraine
- Kalnik, an evil alien character in Mork & Mindy who claims to be from Neptune
