= Podhradie =

Podhradie is a Slovak language term for a castle town and it may refer to one of the following places in Slovakia:

- Podhradie, Bratislava- former borough of Bratislava
- Podhradie, Martin District- village in Slovakia
- Podhradie, Prievidza District- village in Slovakia
- Podhradie, Topoľčany District- village in Slovakia

Podhradie is also part of the name of the following places in Slovakia:

- Spišské Podhradie, small town in Slovakia
- Hričovské Podhradie, village in Slovakia
- Košecké Podhradie, village in Slovakia
- Krásnohorské Podhradie, village in Slovakia
- Plavecké Podhradie, village in Slovakia
- Uhrovské Podhradie, village in Slovakia
- Vršatské Podhradie, village in Slovakia
- Zemianske Podhradie, village in Slovakia
