= Karlová =

- Municipality
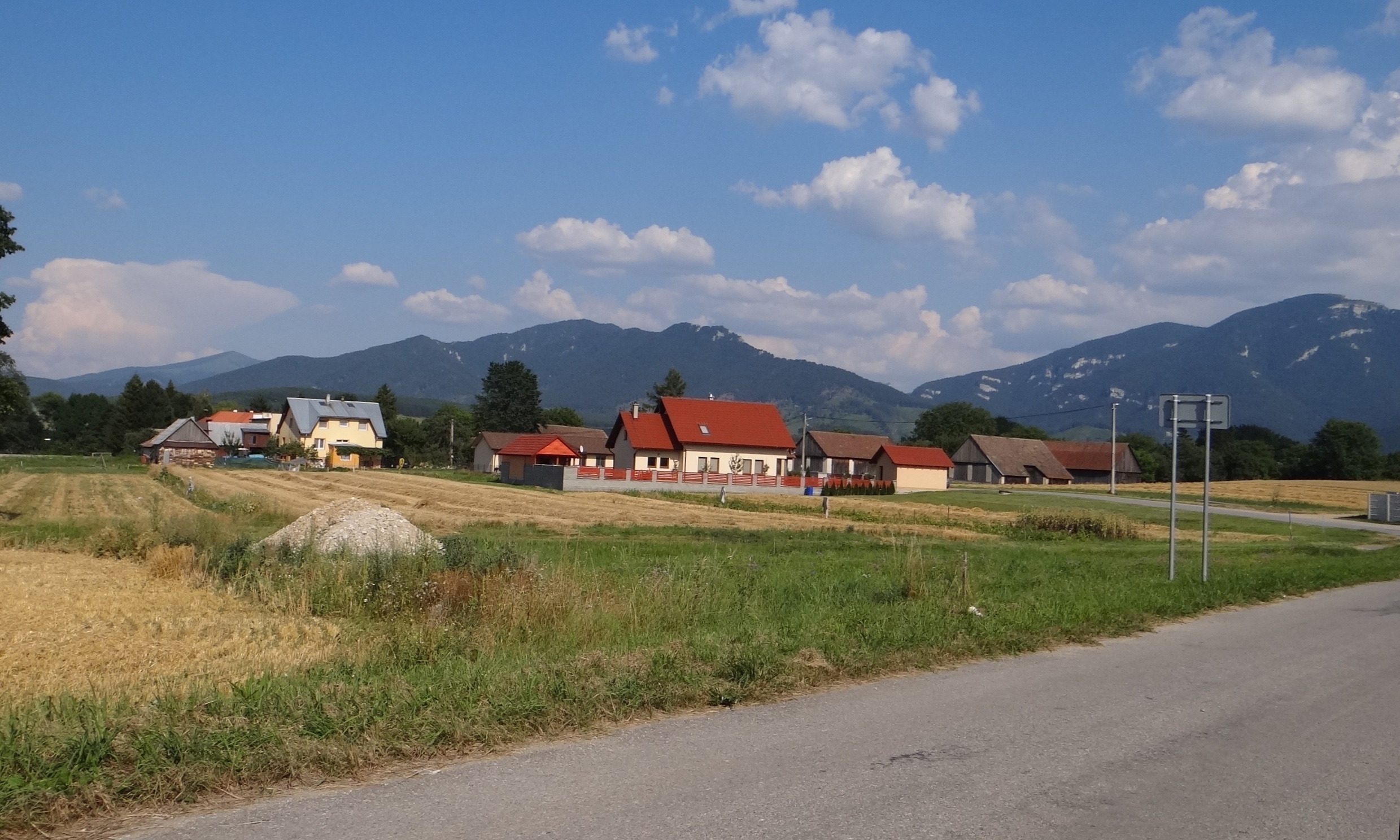

- Flag

- Location of Karlová in the Žilina Region Location of Karlová in Slovakia
- Coordinates: 48.97°N 18.90°E
- Country: Slovakia
- Region: Žilina Region
- District: Martin District
- First mentioned: 1272

Area
  - Total: 1.83 km^{2} (0.71 sq mi)
- Elevation: 471 m (1,545 ft)

Population (2025)
  - Total: 112
- Time zone: UTC+1 (CET)
  - Summer (DST): UTC+2 (CEST)
- Postal code: 381 5
- Area code: +421 43
- Vehicle registration plate (until 2022): MT
- Website: www.karlova.sk

Karlová (Hungarian: Turóckárolyfalva) is a village and municipality in Martin District in the Žilina Region of northern Slovakia.

== History ==
In historical records the village was first mentioned in 1272. Before the establishment of independent Czechoslovakia in 1918, it was part of Turóc County within the Kingdom of Hungary. From 1939 to 1945, it was part of the Slovak Republic.

== Geography ==
The municipality lies at an altitude of 471 metres (1,545 ft) and covers an area of 1.83 km^{2} (0.71 sq mi) (2025).

== Population ==
Population statistic (10 years)
Year	1995	2005	2015	2025
Count	118	116	105	112
Difference		−1.69%	−9.48%	+6.66%

Population statistic
Year	2024	2025
Count	112	112
Difference		−1.42%

It has a population of 112 people (31 December 2025).

=== Ethnicity ===
Census 2021 (1+ %)
Ethnicity	Number	Fraction
Slovak	111	100%
Total	111	

In year 2021 was 111 people by ethnicity 111 as Slovak.

Note on population: The difference values of population numbers in the table "Population statistic" and in the sections "Ethnicity" & "Religion" is caused by the use of various statistical methods.

=== Religion ===
Census 2021 (1+ %)
Religion	Number	Fraction
Roman Catholic Church	51	45.95%
Evangelical Church	30	27.03%
None	24	21.62%
Greek Catholic Church	3	2.7%
Total	111	

In year 2021 was 111 people by religion 51 from Roman Catholic Church, 30 from Evangelical Church, 24 from None, 3 from Greek Catholic Church, 1 from Paganism and natural spirituality, 1 from United Methodist Church and 1 from Ad hoc movements.

== Genealogical resources ==
The records for genealogical research are available at the state archive "Statny Archiv in Bytca, Slovakia"

- Roman Catholic church records (births/marriages/deaths): 1690–1950 (parish B)
- Lutheran church records (births/marriages/deaths): 1785–1929 (parish B)

== See also ==
- List of municipalities and towns in Slovakia
