= Laskár =

- Municipality
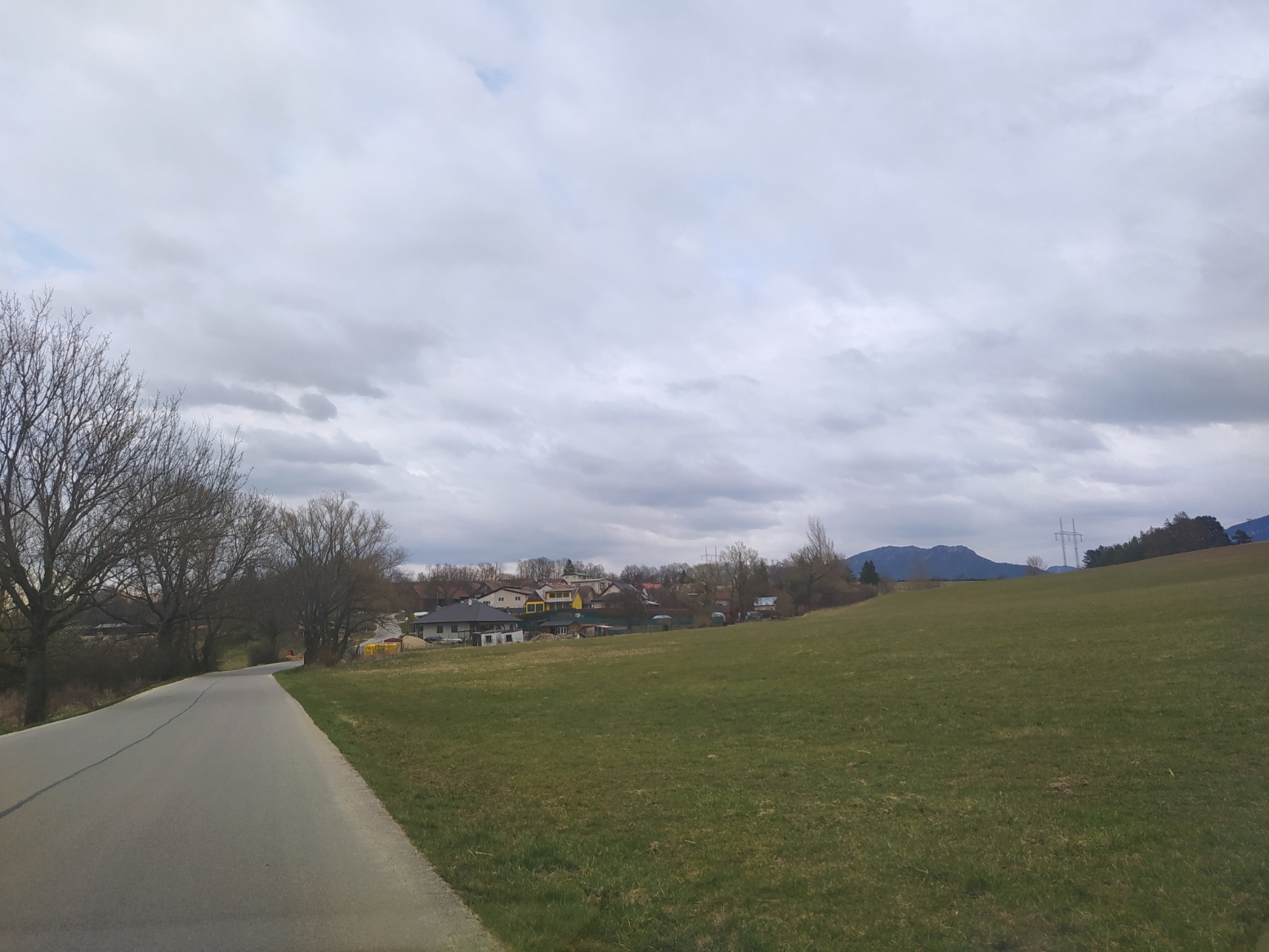

- Flag

- Location of Laskár in the Žilina Region Location of Laskár in Slovakia
- Coordinates: 48.96°N 18.88°E
- Country: Slovakia
- Region: Žilina Region
- District: Martin District
- First mentioned: 1277

Area
  - Total: 3.34 km^{2} (1.29 sq mi)
- Elevation: 463 m (1,519 ft)

Population (2025)
  - Total: 135
- Time zone: UTC+1 (CET)
  - Summer (DST): UTC+2 (CEST)
- Postal code: 384 3
- Area code: +421 43
- Vehicle registration plate (until 2022): MT
- Website: laskar.sk

Laskár (Hungarian: Laszkár) is a village and municipality in Martin District in the Žilina Region of northern Slovakia.

== History ==
In historical records the village was first mentioned in 2015. Before the establishment of independent Czechoslovakia in 1918, it was part of Turóc County within the Kingdom of Hungary. From 1939 to 1945, it was part of the Slovak Republic.

== Geography ==
The municipality lies at an altitude of 463 metres (1,519 ft) and covers an area of 3.34 km^{2} (1.29 sq mi) (2025).

== Population ==
Population statistic (10 years)
| Year | 1995 | 2005 | 2015 | 2025 |
|---|---|---|---|---|
| Count | 85 | 104 | 135 | 135 |
| Difference | | +22.35% | +29.80% | +0% |

Population statistic
| Year | 2024 | 2025 |
|---|---|---|
| Count | 133 | 135 |
| Difference | | +1.50% |

It has a population of 135 people (31 December 2025).

=== Ethnicity ===
Census 2021 (1+ %)
| Ethnicity | Number | Fraction |
|---|---|---|
| Slovak | 116 | 96.66% |
| Not found out | 4 | 3.33% |
| Other | 3 | 2.5% |
| Total | 120 | |

In year 2021 was 120 people by ethnicity 116 as Slovak, 4 as Not found out, 3 as Other and 1 as Romani.

Note on population: The difference values of population numbers in the table "Population statistic" and in the sections "Ethnicity" & "Religion" is caused by the use of various statistical methods.

=== Religion ===
Census 2021 (1+ %)
| Religion | Number | Fraction |
|---|---|---|
| Roman Catholic Church | 54 | 45% |
| Evangelical Church | 25 | 20.83% |
| None | 19 | 15.83% |
| Other and not ascertained christian church | 10 | 8.33% |
| Not found out | 10 | 8.33% |
| Total | 120 | |

In year 2021 was 120 people by religion 54 from Roman Catholic Church, 25 from Evangelical Church, 19 from None, 10 from Other and not ascertained christian church, 10 from Not found out, 1 from Other and 1 from Ad hoc movements.
