= Turčiansky Ďur =

- Municipality
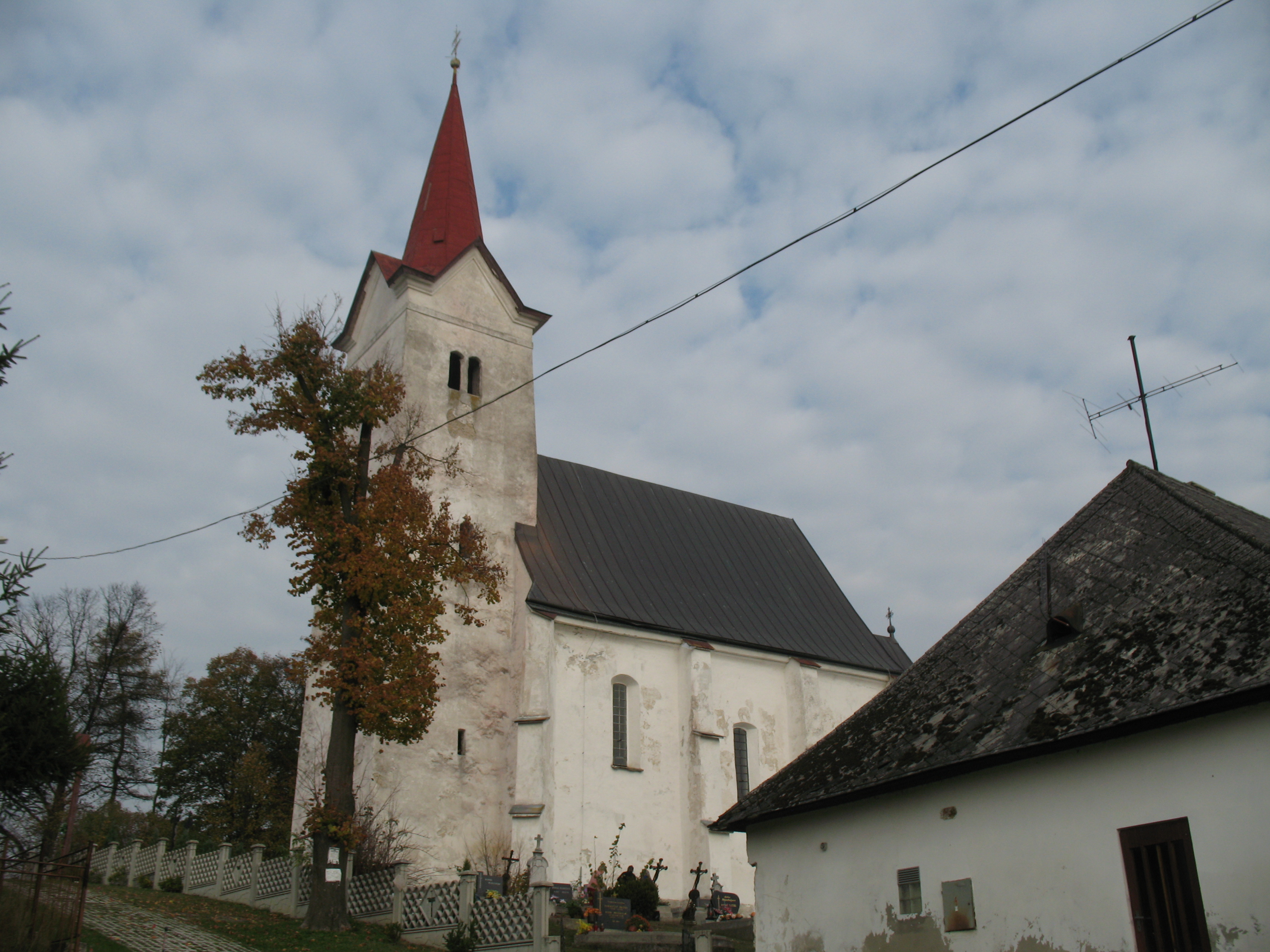
- Saint George Church

- Flag

- Location of Turčiansky Ďur in the Žilina Region Location of Turčiansky Ďur in Slovakia
- Coordinates: 48.95°N 18.84°E
- Country: Slovakia
- Region: Žilina Region
- District: Martin District
- First mentioned: 1352

Area
  - Total: 0.93 km^{2} (0.36 sq mi)
- Elevation: 457 m (1,499 ft)

Population (2025)
  - Total: 153
- Time zone: UTC+1 (CET)
  - Summer (DST): UTC+2 (CEST)
- Postal code: 384 3
- Area code: +421 43
- Vehicle registration plate (until 2022): MT
- Website: www.turcianskydur.sk

Turčiansky Ďur (Hungarian: Turócszentgyörgy, German: Sankt Georg) is a village and municipality in Martin District in the Žilina Region of northern Slovakia.

== History ==
In historical records the village was first mentioned in 1352. Before the establishment of independent Czechoslovakia in 1918, it was part of Turóc County within the Kingdom of Hungary. From 1939 to 1945, it was part of the Slovak Republic.

== Geography ==
The municipality lies at an altitude of 457 metres (1,499 ft) and covers an area of 0.93 km^{2} (0.36 sq mi) (2025).

== Population ==
Population statistic (10 years)
Year	1995	2005	2015	2025
Count	176	193	172	153
Difference		+9.65%	−10.88%	−11.04%

Population statistic
Year	2024	2025
Count	164	153
Difference		−6.70%

It has a population of 153 people (31 December 2025).

=== Ethnicity ===
Census 2021 (1+ %)
Ethnicity	Number	Fraction
Slovak	162	94.73%
Not found out	9	5.26%
Total	171	

In year 2021 was 171 people by ethnicity 162 as Slovak, 9 as Not found out and 1 as Vietnamese.

Note on population: The difference values of population numbers in the table "Population statistic" and in the sections "Ethnicity" & "Religion" is caused by the use of various statistical methods.

=== Religion ===
Census 2021 (1+ %)
Religion	Number	Fraction
Roman Catholic Church	125	73.1%
None	24	14.04%
Evangelical Church	11	6.43%
Not found out	9	5.26%
Total	171	

In year 2021 was 171 people by religion 125 from Roman Catholic Church, 24 from None, 11 from Evangelical Church, 9 from Not found out, 1 from Greek Catholic Church and 1 from Ad hoc movements.
