= Príbovce =

- Municipality
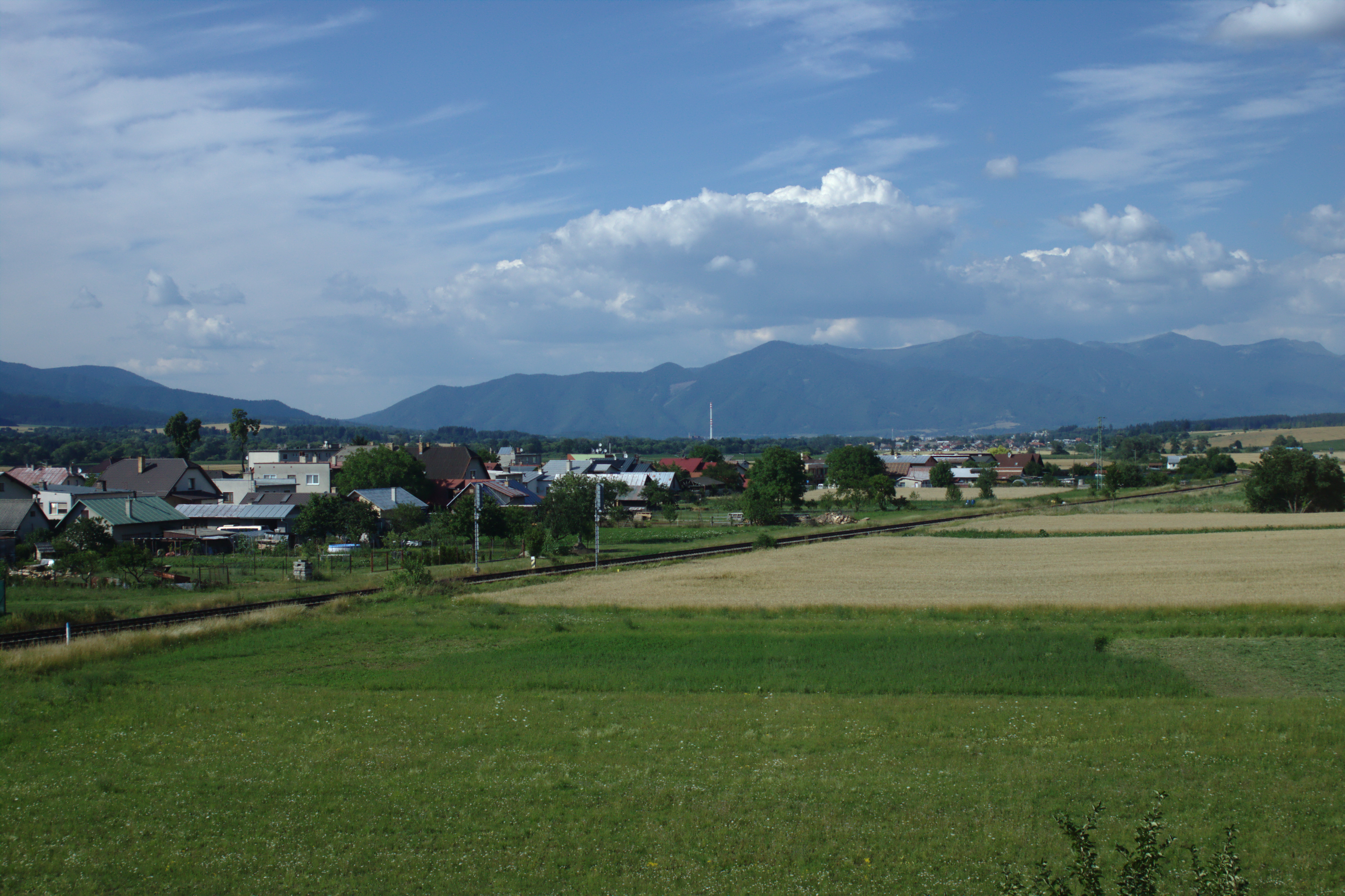

- Flag

- Location of Príbovce in the Žilina Region Location of Príbovce in Slovakia
- Coordinates: 49.00°N 18.88°E
- Country: Slovakia
- Region: Žilina Region
- District: Martin District
- First mentioned: 1230

Area
  - Total: 5.97 km^{2} (2.31 sq mi)
- Elevation: 422 m (1,385 ft)

Population (2025)
  - Total: 1,096
- Time zone: UTC+1 (CET)
  - Summer (DST): UTC+2 (CEST)
- Postal code: 384 2
- Area code: +421 43
- Vehicle registration plate (until 2022): MT
- Website: www.obecpribovce.sk

Príbovce (Hungarian: Pribóc, German: Pribotz) is a village and municipality in Martin District in the Žilina Region of northern Slovakia.

== History ==
In historical records the village was first mentioned in 1230. Before the establishment of independent Czechoslovakia in 1918, it was part of Turóc County within the Kingdom of Hungary. From 1939 to 1945, it was part of the Slovak Republic.

== Geography ==
The municipality lies at an altitude of 422 metres (1,385 ft) and covers an area of 5.97 km^{2} (2.31 sq mi) (2025).

== Population ==
Population statistic (10 years)
Year	1995	2005	2015	2025
Count	976	1057	1093	1096
Difference		+8.29%	+3.40%	+0.27%

Population statistic
Year	2024	2025
Count	1098	1096
Difference		−0.18%

It has a population of 1096 people (31 December 2025).

=== Ethnicity ===
Census 2021 (1+ %)
Ethnicity	Number	Fraction
Slovak	1044	94.73%
Not found out	61	5.53%
Total	1102	

In year 2021 was 1102 people by ethnicity 1044 as Slovak, 61 as Not found out, 5 as Czech, 4 as Russian, 1 as Ukrainian, 1 as Rusyn, 1 as Hungarian, 1 as Other and 1 as Bulgarian.

Note on population: The difference values of population numbers in the table "Population statistic" and in the sections "Ethnicity" & "Religion" is caused by the use of various statistical methods.

=== Religion ===
Census 2021 (1+ %)
Religion	Number	Fraction
Roman Catholic Church	456	41.38%
None	319	28.95%
Evangelical Church	252	22.87%
Not found out	58	5.26%
Total	1102	

In year 2021 was 1102 people by religion 456 from Roman Catholic Church, 319 from None, 252 from Evangelical Church, 58 from Not found out, 7 from Greek Catholic Church, 3 from Buddhism, 3 from Ad hoc movements, 1 from Old Catholic Church, 1 from Eastern Orthodox Church, 1 from Paganism and natural spirituality and 1 from Apostolic Church.
