= Socovce =

Village and municipality in Slovakia

- Municipality
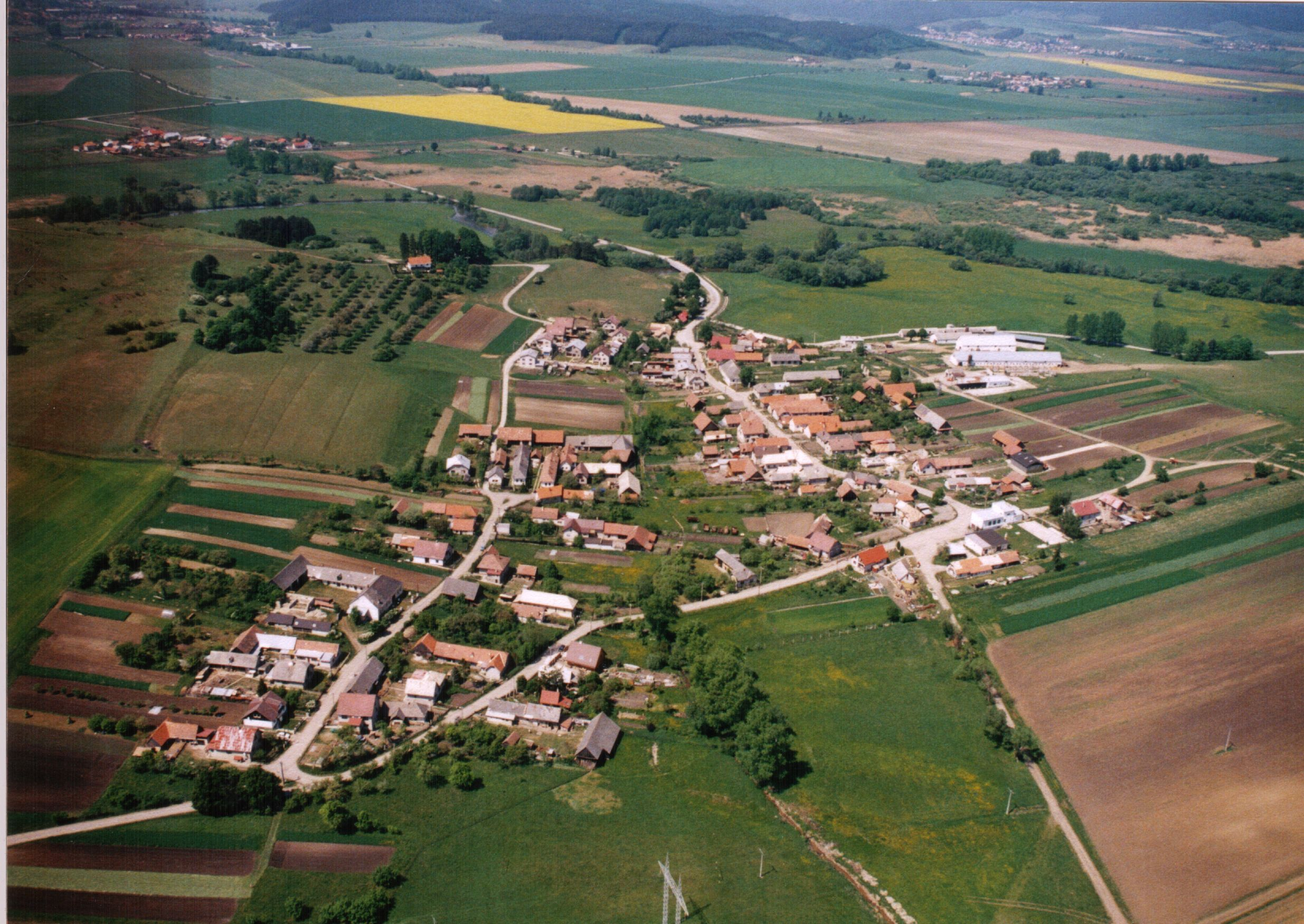

- Flag

- Location of Socovce in the Žilina Region Location of Socovce in Slovakia
- Coordinates: 48.95°N 18.87°E
- Country: Slovakia
- Region: Žilina Region
- District: Martin District
- First mentioned: 1258

Area
  - Total: 5.10 km^{2} (1.97 sq mi)
- Elevation: 444 m (1,457 ft)

Population (2025)
  - Total: 234
- Time zone: UTC+1 (CET)
  - Summer (DST): UTC+2 (CEST)
- Postal code: 384 3
- Area code: +421 43
- Vehicle registration plate (until 2022): MT
- Website: socovce.sk

Socovce (Hungarian: Szocóc) is a village and municipality in Martin District in the Žilina Region of northern Slovakia.

== History ==
In historical records the village was first mentioned in 1258. Before the establishment of independent Czechoslovakia in 1918, it was part of Turóc County within the Kingdom of Hungary. From 1939 to 1945, it was part of the Slovak Republic.

== Geography ==
The municipality lies at an altitude of 444 metres (1,457 ft) and covers an area of 5.10 km^{2} (1.97 sq mi) (2025).

== Population ==
Population statistic (10 years)
Year	1995	2005	2015	2025
Count	236	237	245	234
Difference		+0.42%	+3.37%	−4.48%

Population statistic
Year	2024	2025
Count	227	234
Difference		+3.08%

It has a population of 234 people (31 December 2025).

=== Ethnicity ===
Census 2021 (1+ %)
Ethnicity	Number	Fraction
Slovak	228	95.39%
Not found out	9	3.76%
Total	239	

In year 2021 was 239 people by ethnicity 228 as Slovak, 9 as Not found out, 2 as Other and 1 as Romani.

Note on population: The difference values of population numbers in the table "Population statistic" and in the sections "Ethnicity" & "Religion" is caused by the use of various statistical methods.

=== Religion ===
Census 2021 (1+ %)
Religion	Number	Fraction
Roman Catholic Church	172	71.97%
None	37	15.48%
Evangelical Church	14	5.86%
Not found out	10	4.18%
Greek Catholic Church	4	1.67%
Total	239	

In year 2021 was 239 people by religion 172 from Roman Catholic Church, 37 from None, 14 from Evangelical Church, 10 from Not found out, 4 from Greek Catholic Church and 2 from Other and not ascertained christian church.
