= Nolčovo =

- Municipality
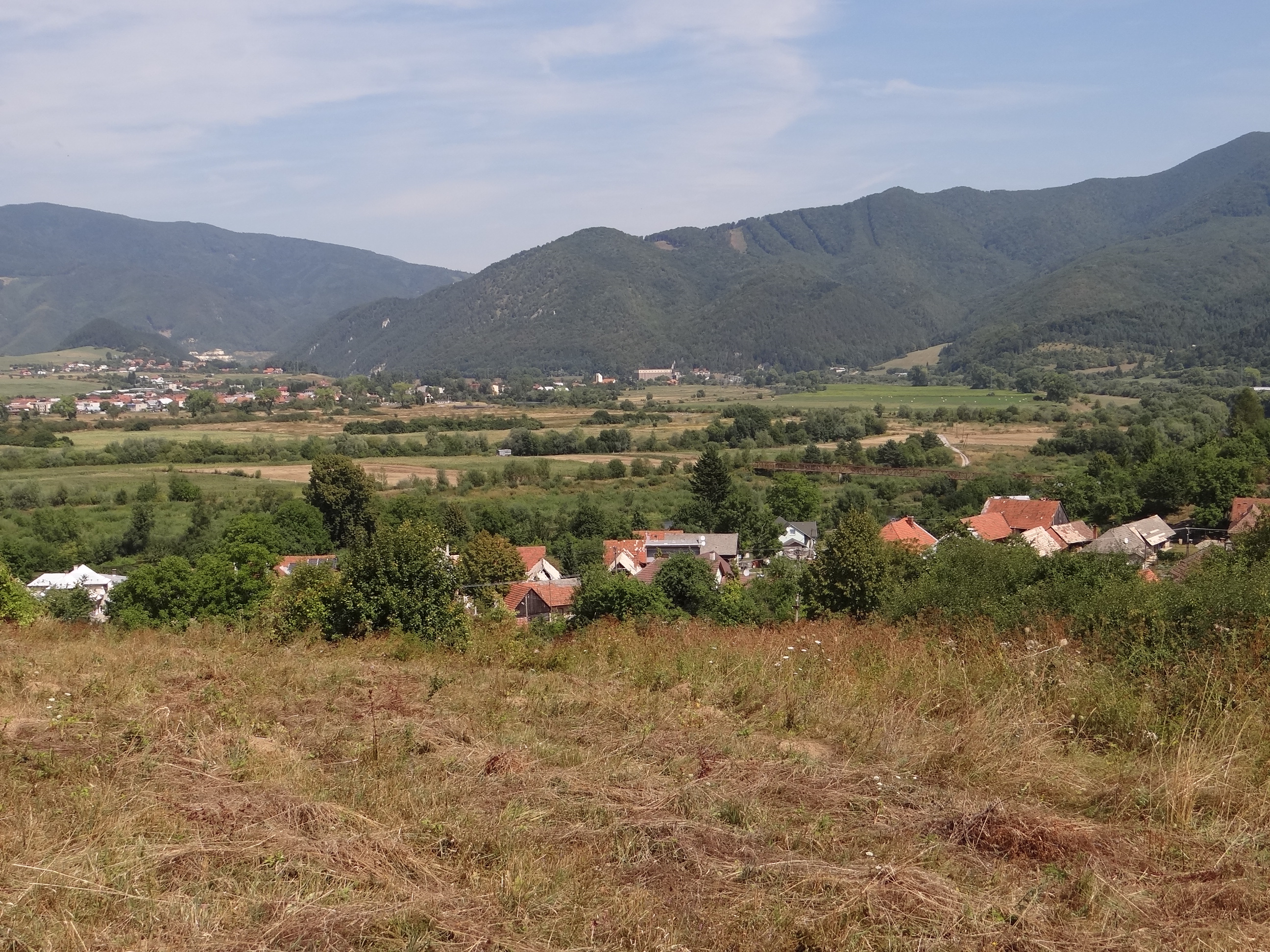

- Flag

- Location of Nolčovo in the Žilina Region Location of Nolčovo in Slovakia
- Coordinates: 49.12°N 19.08°E
- Country: Slovakia
- Region: Žilina Region
- District: Martin District
- First mentioned: 1571

Area
  - Total: 15.01 km^{2} (5.80 sq mi)
- Elevation: 421 m (1,381 ft)

Population (2025)
  - Total: 248
- Time zone: UTC+1 (CET)
  - Summer (DST): UTC+2 (CEST)
- Postal code: 385 4
- Area code: +421 43
- Vehicle registration plate (until 2022): MT
- Website: www.nolcovo.sk

Nolčovo (Hungarian: Nolcsó) is a village and municipality in Martin District in the Žilina Region of northern Slovakia.

== History ==
In historical records the village was first mentioned in 1571. Before the establishment of independent Czechoslovakia in 1918, it was part of Turóc County within the Kingdom of Hungary. From 1939 to 1945, it was part of the Slovak Republic.

== Geography ==
The municipality lies at an altitude of 421 metres (1,381 ft) and covers an area of 15.01 km^{2} (5.80 sq mi) (2025).

== Population ==
Population statistic (10 years)
Year	1995	2005	2015	2025
Count	309	247	244	248
Difference		−20.06%	−1.21%	+1.63%

Population statistic
Year	2024	2025
Count	254	248
Difference		−2.36%

It has a population of 248 people (31 December 2025).

=== Ethnicity ===
Census 2021 (1+ %)
Ethnicity	Number	Fraction
Slovak	246	96.47%
Czech	6	2.35%
Total	255	

In year 2021 was 255 people by ethnicity 246 as Slovak, 6 as Czech, 2 as Russian, 2 as Other, 1 as Polish, 1 as Not found out and 1 as Hungarian.

Note on population: The difference values of population numbers in the table "Population statistic" and in the sections "Ethnicity" & "Religion" is caused by the use of various statistical methods.

=== Religion ===
Census 2021 (1+ %)
Religion	Number	Fraction
Evangelical Church	174	68.24%
None	50	19.61%
Roman Catholic Church	23	9.02%
Not found out	3	1.18%
Total	255	

In year 2021 was 255 people by religion 174 from Evangelical Church, 50 from None, 23 from Roman Catholic Church, 3 from Not found out, 1 from Christian Congregations in Slovakia, 1 from Other, 1 from Greek Catholic Church, 1 from United Methodist Church and 1 from Ad hoc movements.
