= Trebostovo =

- Municipality
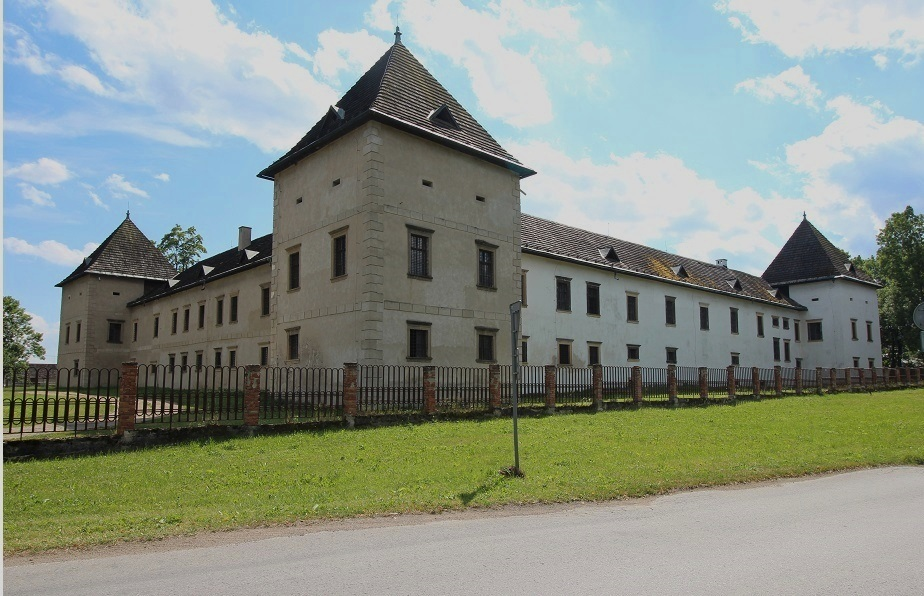
- Révay family Castle

- Flag

- Location of Trebostovo in the Žilina Region Location of Trebostovo in Slovakia
- Coordinates: 49.03°N 18.87°E
- Country: Slovakia
- Region: Žilina Region
- District: Martin District
- First mentioned: 1262

Area
  - Total: 13.12 km^{2} (5.07 sq mi)
- Elevation: 471 m (1,545 ft)

Population (2025)
  - Total: 642
- Time zone: UTC+1 (CET)
  - Summer (DST): UTC+2 (CEST)
- Postal code: 384 1
- Area code: +421 43
- Vehicle registration plate (until 2022): MT
- Website: www.trebostovo.sk/cms/

Trebostovo (Hungarian: Kistorboszló) is a village and municipality in Martin District in the Žilina Region of northern Slovakia.

== History ==
In historical records the village was first mentioned in 1262. Before the establishment of independent Czechoslovakia in 1918, it was part of Turóc County within the Kingdom of Hungary. From 1939 to 1945, it was part of the Slovak Republic.

== Geography ==
The municipality lies at an altitude of 471 metres (1,545 ft) and covers an area of 13.12 km^{2} (5.07 sq mi) (2025).

== Population ==
Population statistic (10 years)
| Year | 1995 | 2005 | 2015 | 2025 |
|---|---|---|---|---|
| Count | 423 | 454 | 546 | 642 |
| Difference | | +7.32% | +20.26% | +17.58% |

Population statistic
| Year | 2024 | 2025 |
|---|---|---|
| Count | 651 | 642 |
| Difference | | −1.38% |

It has a population of 642 people (31 December 2025).

=== Ethnicity ===
Census 2021 (1+ %)
| Ethnicity | Number | Fraction |
|---|---|---|
| Slovak | 594 | 99% |
| Not found out | 8 | 1.33% |
| Total | 600 | |

In year 2021 was 600 people by ethnicity 594 as Slovak, 8 as Not found out, 4 as Czech, 4 as Rusyn, 1 as Austrian, 1 as Moravian and 1 as Other.

Note on population: The difference values of population numbers in the table "Population statistic" and in the sections "Ethnicity" & "Religion" is caused by the use of various statistical methods.

=== Religion ===
Census 2021 (1+ %)
| Religion | Number | Fraction |
|---|---|---|
| Roman Catholic Church | 202 | 33.67% |
| Evangelical Church | 192 | 32% |
| None | 187 | 31.17% |
| Not found out | 7 | 1.17% |
| Total | 600 | |

In year 2021 was 600 people by religion 202 from Roman Catholic Church, 192 from Evangelical Church, 187 from None, 7 from Not found out, 3 from United Methodist Church, 2 from Christian Congregations in Slovakia, 2 from Other, 2 from Hinduism, 2 from Greek Catholic Church and 1 from Other and not ascertained christian church.
