= Sklabinský Podzámok =

Village and municipality in Martin, Žilina, Slovakia

- Municipality
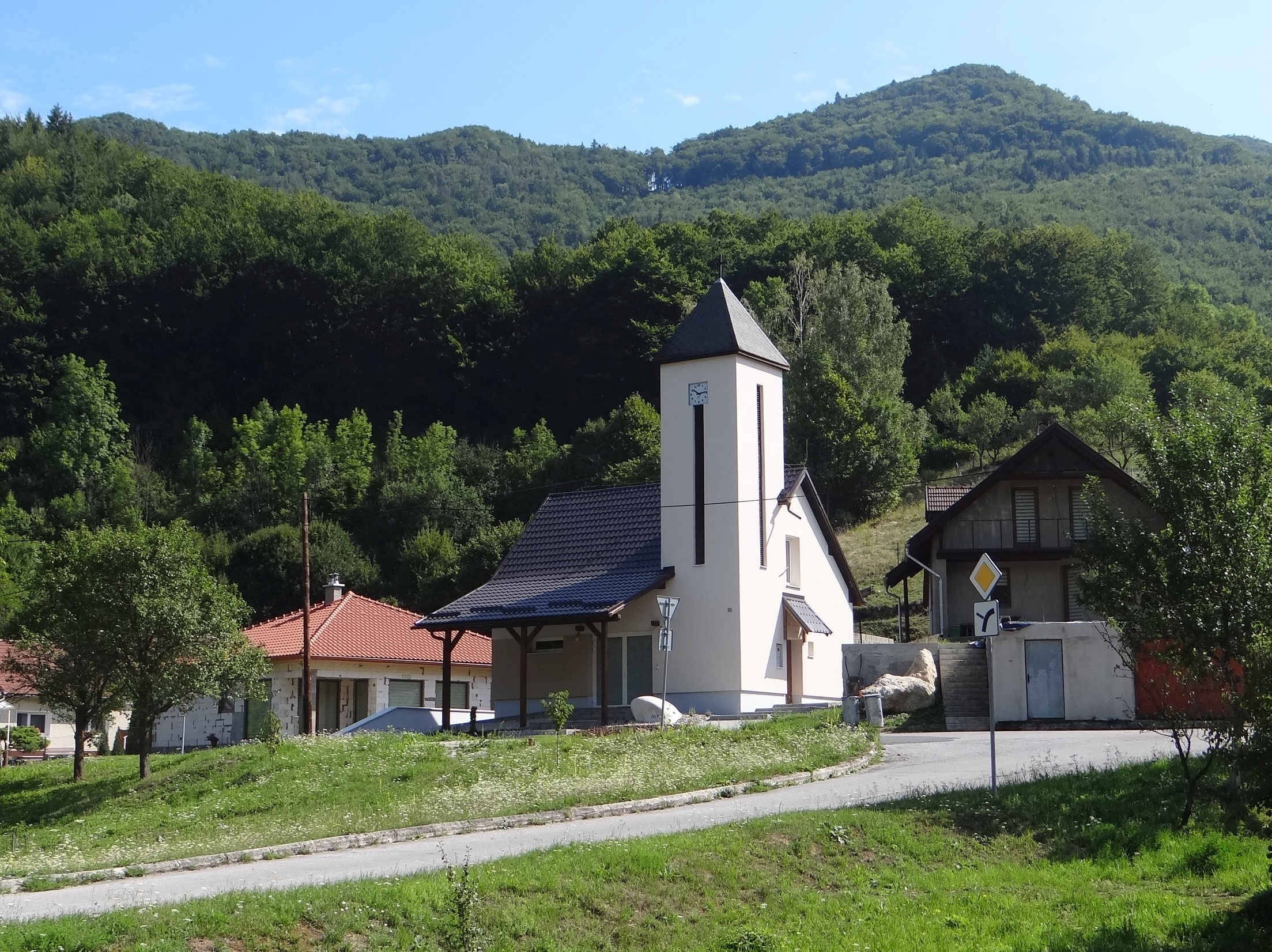

- Flag

- Location of Sklabinský Podzámok in the Žilina Region Location of Sklabinský Podzámok in Slovakia
- Coordinates: 49.05°N 19.03°E
- Country: Slovakia
- Region: Žilina Region
- District: Martin District
- First mentioned: 1678

Area
  - Total: 27.14 km^{2} (10.48 sq mi)
- Elevation: 508 m (1,667 ft)

Population (2025)
  - Total: 179
- Time zone: UTC+1 (CET)
  - Summer (DST): UTC+2 (CEST)
- Postal code: 380 3
- Area code: +421 43
- Vehicle registration plate (until 2022): MT
- Website: www.obecsklabinskypodzamok.sk

Sklabinský Podzámok (Hungarian: Szklabinyaváralja) is a village and municipality in Martin District in the Žilina Region of northern Slovakia.

== History ==
In historical records the village was first mentioned in 1678. Before the establishment of independent Czechoslovakia in 1918, it was part of Turóc County within the Kingdom of Hungary. From 1939 to 1945, it was part of the Slovak Republic.

== Geography ==
The municipality lies at an altitude of 508 metres (1,667 ft) and covers an area of 27.14 km^{2} (10.48 sq mi) (2025).

== Population ==
Population statistic (10 years)
Year	1995	2005	2015	2025
Count	158	171	188	179
Difference		+8.22%	+9.94%	−4.78%

Population statistic
Year	2024	2025
Count	180	179
Difference		−0.55%

It has a population of 179 people (31 December 2025).

=== Ethnicity ===
Census 2021 (1+ %)
Ethnicity	Number	Fraction
Slovak	180	99.44%
Not found out	4	2.2%
Czech	2	1.1%
Total	181	

In year 2021 was 181 people by ethnicity 180 as Slovak, 4 as Not found out, 2 as Czech, 1 as Russian, 1 as Polish and 1 as English.

Note on population: The difference values of population numbers in the table "Population statistic" and in the sections "Ethnicity" & "Religion" is caused by the use of various statistical methods.

=== Religion ===
Census 2021 (1+ %)
Religion	Number	Fraction
Roman Catholic Church	79	43.65%
Evangelical Church	60	33.15%
None	40	22.1%
Total	181	

In year 2021 was 181 people by religion 79 from Roman Catholic Church, 60 from Evangelical Church, 40 from None, 1 from Not found out and 1 from Greek Catholic Church.
