= Lipovec, Martin District =

City in Slovakia

Lipovec
- Municipality
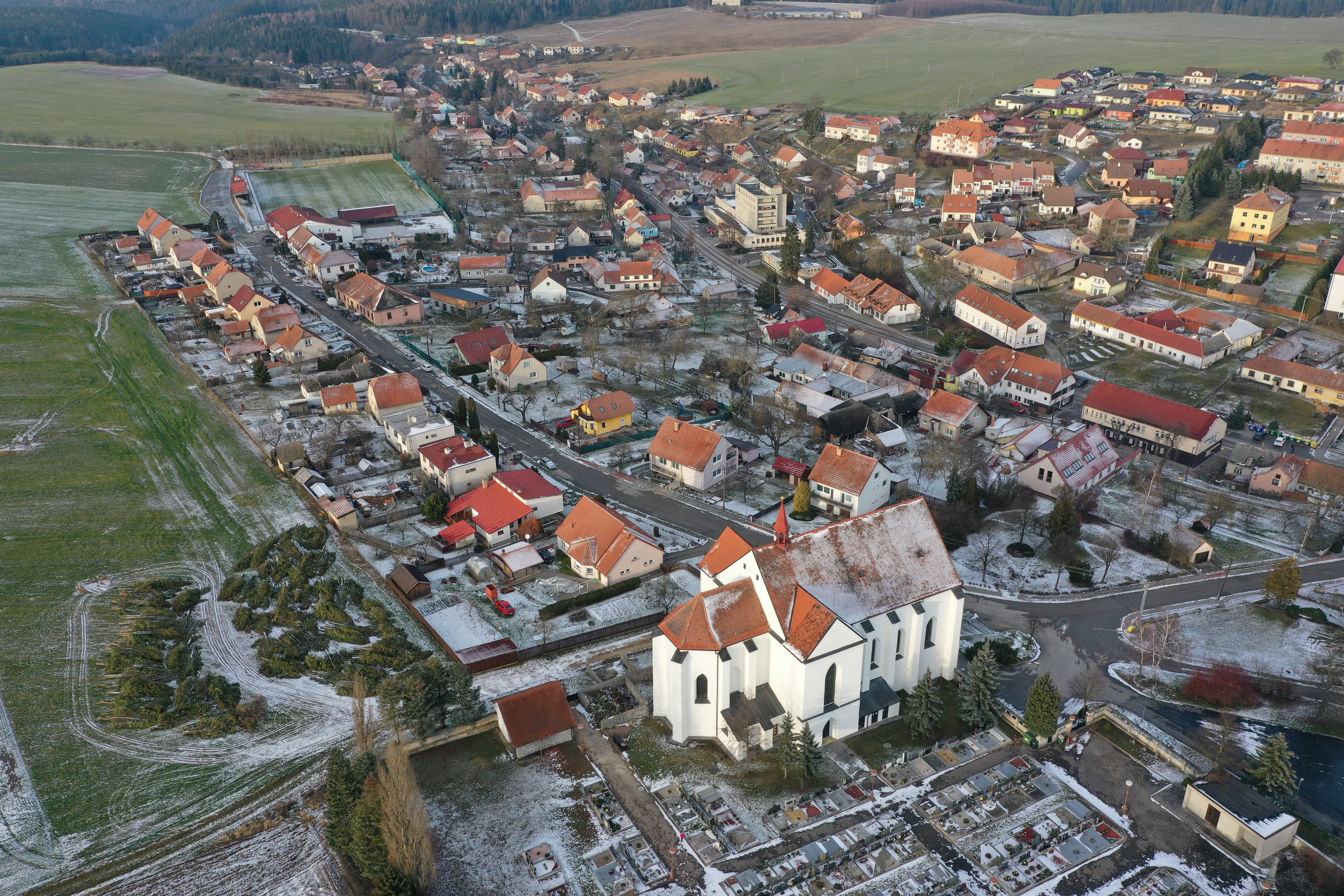

- Flag

- Location of Lipovec in the Žilina Region Location of Lipovec in Slovakia
- Coordinates: 49°07′40″N 18°55′30″E
- Country: Slovakia
- Region: Žilina Region
- District: Martin District
- First mentioned: 1395

Area
  - Total: 12.75 km^{2} (4.92 sq mi)
- Elevation: 400 m (1,300 ft)

Population (2025)
  - Total: 896
- Time zone: UTC+1 (CET)
  - Summer (DST): UTC+2 (CEST)
- Postal code: 386 1
- Area code: +421 43
- Vehicle registration plate (until 2022): MT
- Website: www.lipovec.sk

Lipovec (Hungarian: Lamosfalva) is a village and municipality in Martin District in the Žilina Region of northern Slovakia.

== History ==
In historical records the village was first mentioned in 1395. Before the establishment of independent Czechoslovakia in 1918, it was part of Turóc County within the Kingdom of Hungary. From 1939 to 1945, it was part of the Slovak Republic.

== Geography ==
The municipality lies at an altitude of 400 metres (1,300 ft) and covers an area of 12.75 km^{2} (4.92 sq mi) (2025).

== Population ==
Population statistic (10 years)
Year	1995	2005	2015	2025
Count	708	853	949	896
Difference		+20.48%	+11.25%	−5.58%

Population statistic
Year	2024	2025
Count	912	896
Difference		−1.75%

It has a population of 896 people (31 December 2025).

=== Ethnicity ===
Census 2021 (1+ %)
Ethnicity	Number	Fraction
Slovak	860	95.66%
Not found out	25	2.78%
Czech	22	2.44%
Total	899	

In year 2021 was 899 people by ethnicity 860 as Slovak, 25 as Not found out, 22 as Czech, 7 as Other, 4 as Rusyn, 2 as Russian, 1 as Polish and 1 as German.

Note on population: The difference values of population numbers in the table "Population statistic" and in the sections "Ethnicity" & "Religion" is caused by the use of various statistical methods.

=== Religion ===
Census 2021 (1+ %)
Religion	Number	Fraction
None	369	41.05%
Roman Catholic Church	289	32.15%
Evangelical Church	175	19.47%
Not found out	29	3.23%
Total	899	

In year 2021 was 899 people by religion 369 from None, 289 from Roman Catholic Church, 175 from Evangelical Church, 29 from Not found out, 8 from Other and not ascertained christian church, 8 from Greek Catholic Church, 4 from Buddhism, 3 from Christian Congregations in Slovakia, 3 from Other, 3 from Ad hoc movements, 2 from Old Catholic Church, 2 from Calvinist Church, 1 from Paganism and natural spirituality, 1 from United Methodist Church, 1 from Seventh-day Adventist Church and 1 from Bahá'i Community.
