= Turčianske Kľačany =

- Municipality
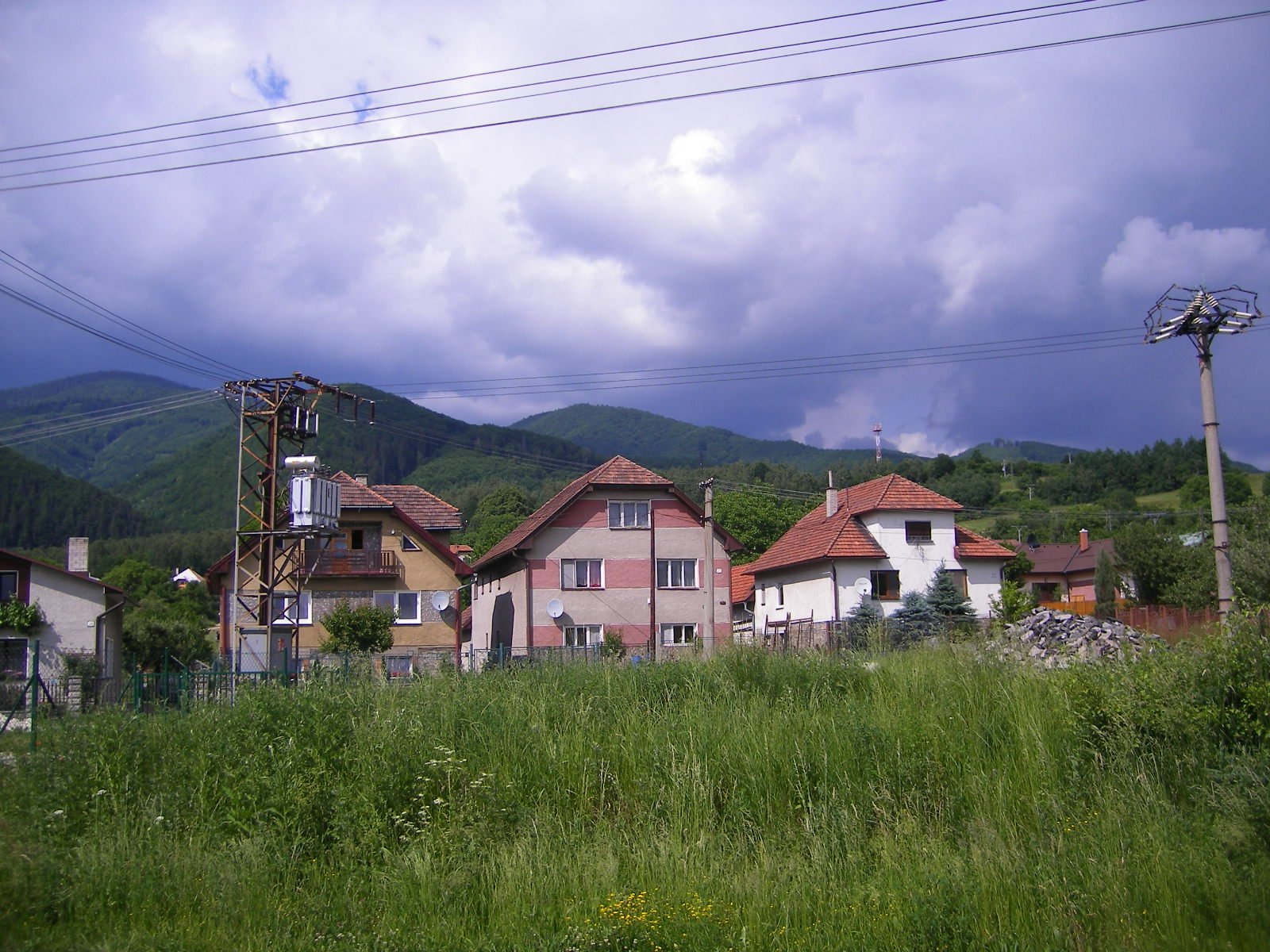

- Flag

- Location of Turčianske Kľačany in the Žilina Region Location of Turčianske Kľačany in Slovakia
- Coordinates: 49.12°N 18.95°E
- Country: Slovakia
- Region: Žilina Region
- District: Martin District
- First mentioned: 1403

Area
  - Total: 12.20 km^{2} (4.71 sq mi)
- Elevation: 410 m (1,350 ft)

Population (2025)
  - Total: 1,050
- Time zone: UTC+1 (CET)
  - Summer (DST): UTC+2 (CEST)
- Postal code: 386 1
- Area code: +421 43
- Vehicle registration plate (until 2022): MT
- Website: www.turcianskeklacany.sk

Turčianske Kľačany (Hungarian: Vágkelecsény) is a village and municipality in Martin District in the Žilina Region of northern Slovakia.

== Etymology ==
Slovak Kľačane, see Kľačany for the details.

== History ==
In historical records the village was first mentioned in 1403. Before the establishment of independent Czechoslovakia in 1918, it was part of Turóc County within the Kingdom of Hungary. From 1939 to 1945, it was part of the Slovak Republic.

== Geography ==
The municipality lies at an altitude of 410 metres (1,350 ft) and covers an area of 12.20 km^{2} (4.71 sq mi) (2025).

== Population ==
Population statistic (10 years)
Year	1995	2005	2015	2025
Count	795	862	926	1050
Difference		+8.42%	+7.42%	+13.39%

Population statistic
Year	2024	2025
Count	1053	1050
Difference		−0.28%

It has a population of 1050 people (31 December 2025).

=== Ethnicity ===
Census 2021 (1+ %)
Ethnicity	Number	Fraction
Slovak	993	96.97%
Not found out	22	2.14%
Czech	11	1.07%
Total	1024	

In year 2021 was 1024 people by ethnicity 993 as Slovak, 22 as Not found out, 11 as Czech, 3 as Other, 2 as Serbian, 2 as Polish, 1 as Irish, 1 as Rusyn, 1 as Russian, 1 as German, 1 as Hungarian and 1 as Bulgarian.

Note on population: The difference values of population numbers in the table "Population statistic" and in the sections "Ethnicity" & "Religion" is caused by the use of various statistical methods.

=== Religion ===
Census 2021 (1+ %)
Religion	Number	Fraction
None	390	38.09%
Evangelical Church	353	34.47%
Roman Catholic Church	214	20.9%
Not found out	41	4%
Total	1024	

In year 2021 was 1024 people by religion 390 from None, 353 from Evangelical Church, 214 from Roman Catholic Church, 41 from Not found out, 9 from Other, 5 from United Methodist Church, 3 from Eastern Orthodox Church, 3 from Other and not ascertained christian church, 2 from Greek Catholic Church, 1 from Old Catholic Church, 1 from Czechoslovak Hussite Church, 1 from Buddhism and 1 from Ad hoc movements.
