= Diaková =

- Municipality
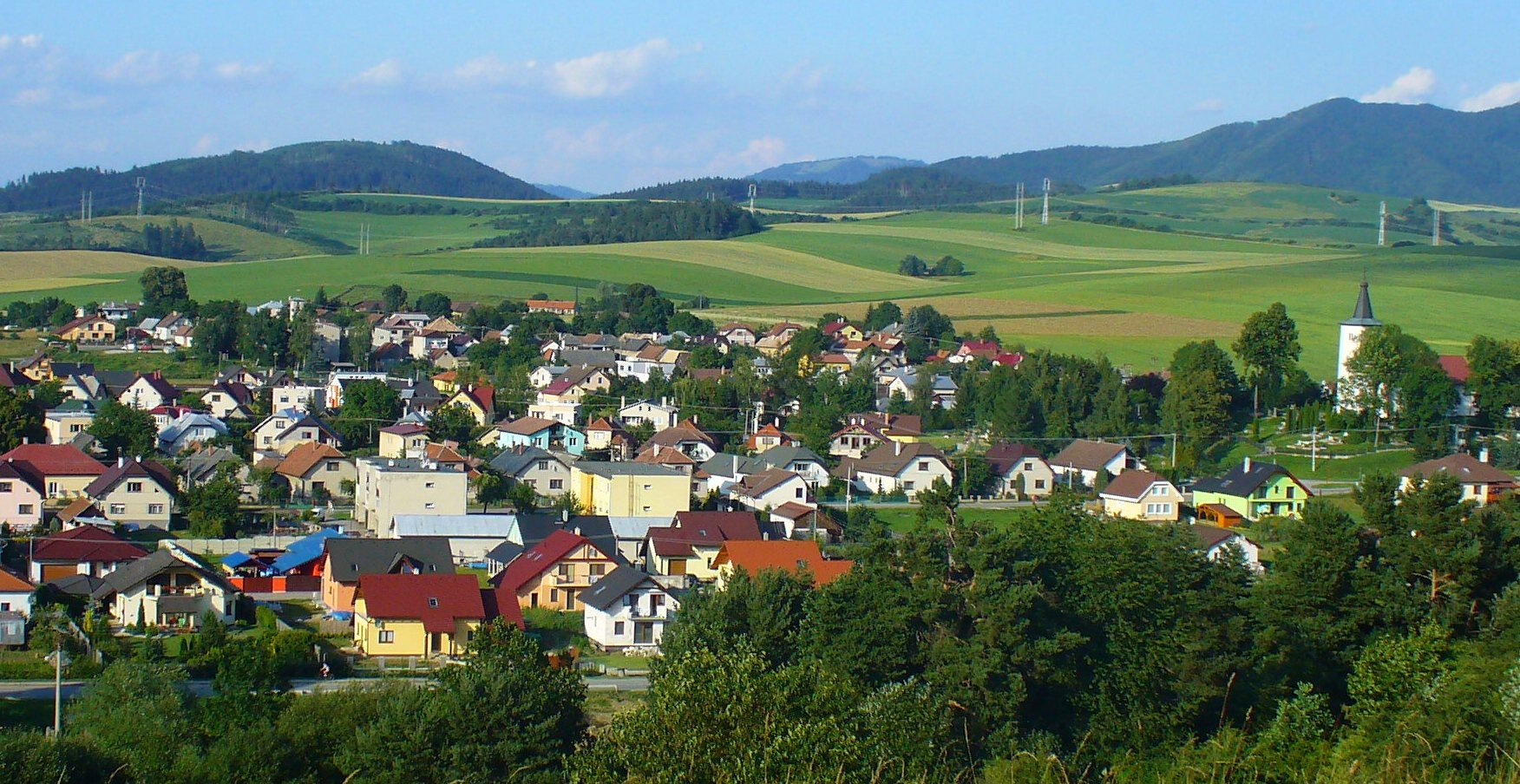

- Flag

- Location of Diaková in the Žilina Region Location of Diaková in Slovakia
- Coordinates: 49.05°N 18.97°E
- Country: Slovakia
- Region: Žilina Region
- District: Martin District
- First mentioned: 1327

Area
  - Total: 2.42 km^{2} (0.93 sq mi)
- Elevation: 436 m (1,430 ft)

Population (2025)
  - Total: 595
- Time zone: UTC+1 (CET)
  - Summer (DST): UTC+2 (CEST)
- Postal code: 380 2
- Area code: +421 43
- Vehicle registration plate (until 2022): MT
- Website: www.diakova.sk

Diaková (Hungarian: Deákfalu) is a village and municipality in Martin District in the Žilina Region of northern Slovakia.

== History ==
In historical records the village was first mentioned in 1327. Before the establishment of independent Czechoslovakia in 1918, it was part of Turóc County within the Kingdom of Hungary. From 1939 to 1945, it was part of the Slovak Republic.

== Geography ==
The municipality lies at an altitude of 436 metres (1,430 ft) and covers an area of 2.42 km^{2} (0.93 sq mi) (2025).

== Population ==
Population statistic (10 years)
Year	1995	2005	2015	2025
Count	223	247	370	595
Difference		+10.76%	+49.79%	+60.81%

Population statistic
Year	2024	2025
Count	595	595
Difference		+0%

It has a population of 595 people (31 December 2025).

=== Ethnicity ===
Census 2021 (1+ %)
Ethnicity	Number	Fraction
Slovak	475	96.74%
Not found out	16	3.25%
Total	491	

In year 2021 was 491 people by ethnicity 475 as Slovak, 16 as Not found out, 4 as Czech, 3 as German, 2 as Polish, 1 as Rusyn and 1 as Hungarian.

Note on population: The difference values of population numbers in the table "Population statistic" and in the sections "Ethnicity" & "Religion" is caused by the use of various statistical methods.

=== Religion ===
Census 2021 (1+ %)
Religion	Number	Fraction
None	186	37.88%
Evangelical Church	165	33.6%
Roman Catholic Church	117	23.83%
Not found out	13	2.65%
Total	491	

In year 2021 was 491 people by religion 186 from None, 165 from Evangelical Church, 117 from Roman Catholic Church, 13 from Not found out, 4 from Paganism and natural spirituality, 2 from Ad hoc movements, 1 from Eastern Orthodox Church, 1 from Greek Catholic Church, 1 from United Methodist Church and 1 from Buddhism.

== Genealogical resources ==
The records for genealogical research are available at the state archive "Statny Archiv in Bytca, Slovakia"

- Lutheran church records (births/marriages/deaths): 1784-1904 (parish B)

== See also ==
- Đakovica in Kosovo (It was once called Diakovitza or Diakova)
- List of municipalities and towns in Slovakia
