= Slovany =

- Municipality
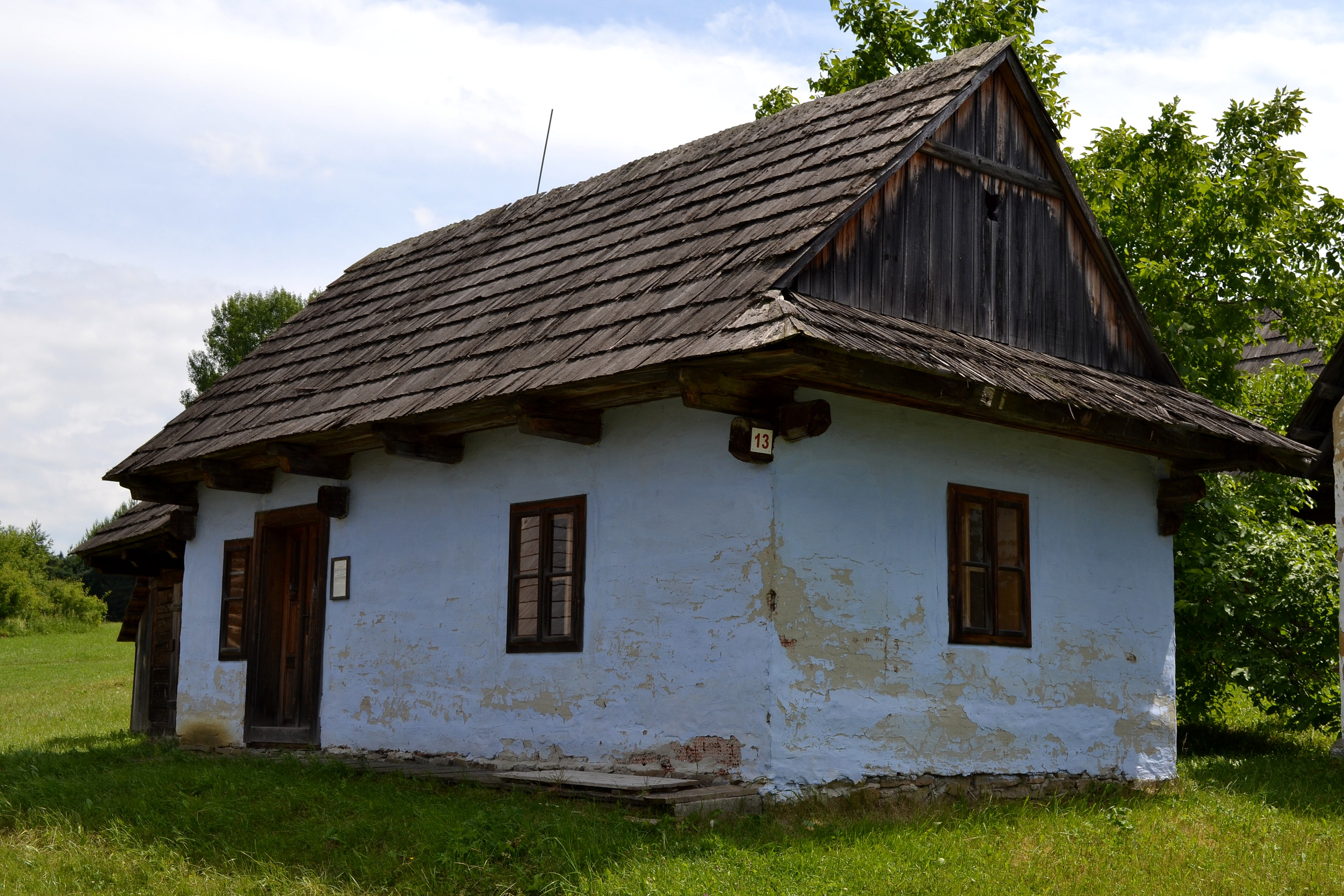

- Flag

- Location of Slovany in the Žilina Region Location of Slovany in Slovakia
- Coordinates: 48.97°N 18.82°E
- Country: Slovakia
- Region: Žilina Region
- District: Martin District
- First mentioned: 1252

Area
  - Total: 14.30 km^{2} (5.52 sq mi)
- Elevation: 471 m (1,545 ft)

Population (2025)
  - Total: 435
- Time zone: UTC+1 (CET)
  - Summer (DST): UTC+2 (CEST)
- Postal code: 384 3
- Area code: +421 43
- Vehicle registration plate (until 2022): MT
- Website: www.obecslovany.sk

Slovany (Hungarian: Turóctótfalu, German: Sloben) is a village and municipality in Martin District in the Žilina Region of northern Slovakia.

== History ==
In historical records the village was first mentioned in 1252. Before the establishment of independent Czechoslovakia in 1918, it was part of Turóc County within the Kingdom of Hungary. From 1939 to 1945, it was part of the Slovak Republic.

== Geography ==
The municipality lies at an altitude of 471 metres (1,545 ft) and covers an area of 14.30 km^{2} (5.52 sq mi) (2025).

== Population ==
Population statistic (10 years)
Year	1995	2005	2015	2025
Count	370	411	451	435
Difference		+11.08%	+9.73%	−3.54%

Population statistic
Year	2024	2025
Count	431	435
Difference		+0.92%

It has a population of 435 people (31 December 2025).

=== Ethnicity ===
Census 2021 (1+ %)
Ethnicity	Number	Fraction
Slovak	431	97.73%
Not found out	8	1.81%
Total	441	

In year 2021 was 441 people by ethnicity 431 as Slovak, 8 as Not found out, 2 as Czech, 2 as Russian, 2 as German, 1 as Moravian and 1 as Canadian.

Note on population: The difference values of population numbers in the table "Population statistic" and in the sections "Ethnicity" & "Religion" is caused by the use of various statistical methods.

=== Religion ===
Census 2021 (1+ %)
Religion	Number	Fraction
Roman Catholic Church	257	58.28%
None	84	19.05%
Evangelical Church	81	18.37%
Not found out	8	1.81%
Christian Congregations in Slovakia	5	1.13%
Buddhism	5	1.13%
Total	441	

In year 2021 was 441 people by religion 257 from Roman Catholic Church, 84 from None, 81 from Evangelical Church, 8 from Not found out, 5 from Christian Congregations in Slovakia, 5 from Buddhism and 1 from Other.
