= Benice, Martin District =

Municipality of Slovakia in Martin district

Benice
- Municipality
- Flag

- Location of Benice in the Žilina Region Location of Benice in Slovakia
- Coordinates: 48.9953°N 18.8711°E
- Country: Slovakia
- Region: Žilina Region
- District: Martin District
- First mentioned: 1267

Area
  - Total: 2.15 km^{2} (0.83 sq mi)
- Elevation: 426 m (1,398 ft)

Population (2025)
  - Total: 336
- Time zone: UTC+1 (CET)
  - Summer (DST): UTC+2 (CEST)
- Postal code: 384 2
- Area code: +421 43
- Vehicle registration plate (until 2022): MT
- Website: www.benice.sk

Benice (Hungarian: Benefalva) is a village and municipality in Martin District in the Žilina Region of northern Slovakia.

== History ==
In historical records the village was first mentioned in 1267. Before the establishment of independent Czechoslovakia in 1918, it was part of Turóc County within the Kingdom of Hungary. From 1939 to 1945, it was part of the Slovak Republic.

== Geography ==
The municipality lies at an altitude of 426 metres (1,398 ft) and covers an area of 2.15 km^{2} (0.83 sq mi) (2025).

== Population ==
Population statistic (10 years)
Year	1995	2005	2015	2025
Count	274	285	355	336
Difference		+4.01%	+24.56%	−5.35%

Population statistic
Year	2024	2025
Count	343	336
Difference		−2.04%

It has a population of 336 people (31 December 2025).

=== Ethnicity ===
Census 2021 (1+ %)
Ethnicity	Number	Fraction
Slovak	348	99.14%
Not found out	9	2.56%
French	4	1.13%
Total	351	

In year 2021 was 351 people by ethnicity 348 as Slovak, 9 as Not found out, 4 as French, 1 as Czech and 1 as Bulgarian.

Note on population: The difference values of population numbers in the table "Population statistic" and in the sections "Ethnicity" & "Religion" is caused by the use of various statistical methods.

=== Religion ===
Census 2021 (1+ %)
Religion	Number	Fraction
Roman Catholic Church	215	61.25%
None	87	24.79%
Evangelical Church	34	9.69%
Not found out	8	2.28%
Total	351	

In year 2021 was 351 people by religion 215 from Roman Catholic Church, 87 from None, 34 from Evangelical Church, 8 from Not found out, 3 from Other and not ascertained christian church, 2 from Greek Catholic Church, 1 from Paganism and natural spirituality and 1 from Ad hoc movements.

== Genealogical resources ==
The records for genealogical research are available at the state archive "Statny Archiv in Bytca, Slovakia"

- Roman Catholic church records (births/marriages/deaths): 1787-1952 (parish B)
- Lutheran church records (births/marriages/deaths): 1783-1928 (parish B)

== See also ==
- List of municipalities and towns in Slovakia
