= Krpeľany =

- Municipality
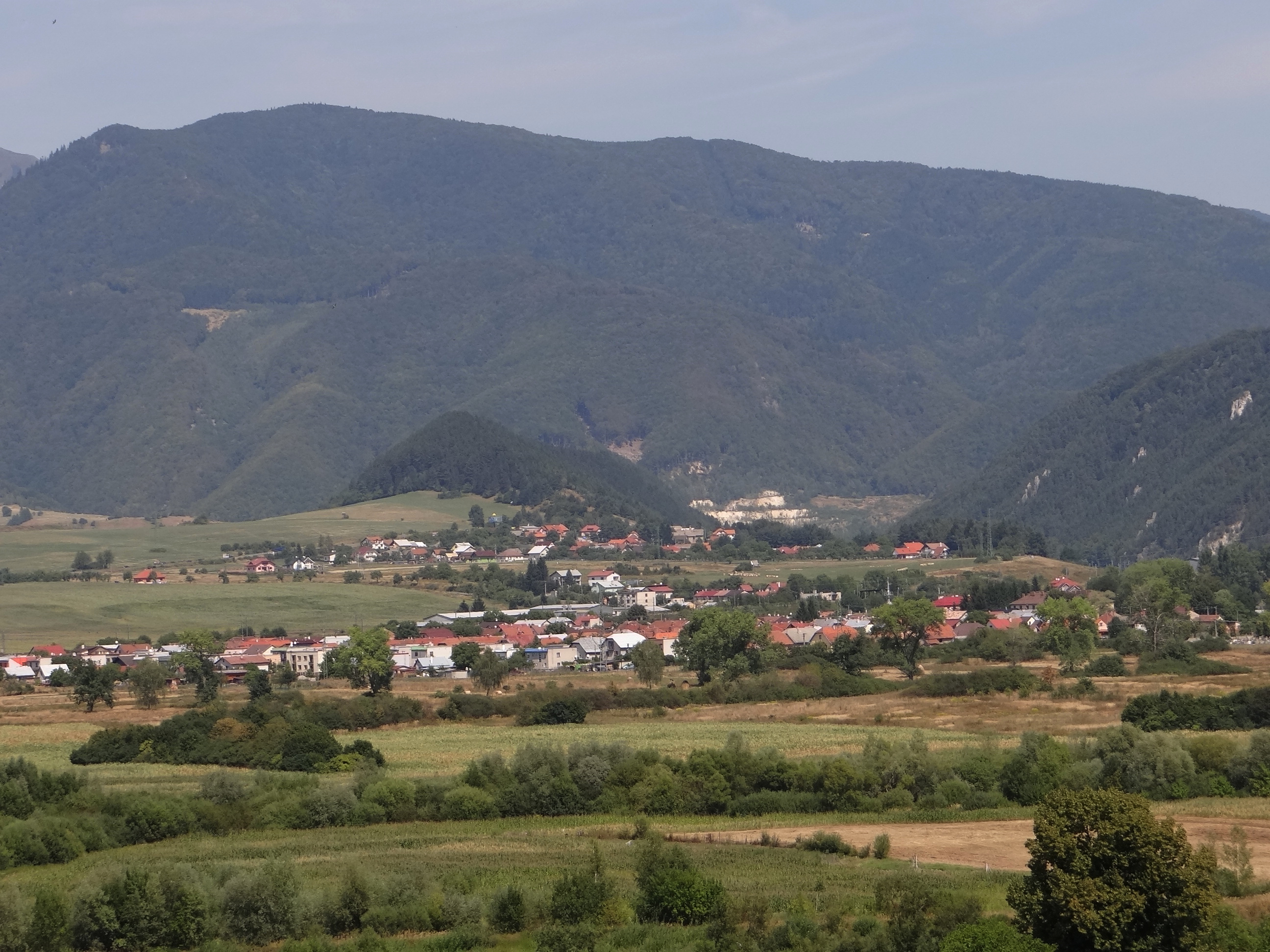

- Flag

- Location of Krpeľany in the Žilina Region Location of Krpeľany in Slovakia
- Coordinates: 49.13°N 19.08°E
- Country: Slovakia
- Region: Žilina Region
- District: Martin District
- First mentioned: 1488

Area
  - Total: 13.88 km^{2} (5.36 sq mi)
- Elevation: 418 m (1,371 ft)

Population (2025)
  - Total: 1,047
- Time zone: UTC+1 (CET)
  - Summer (DST): UTC+2 (CEST)
- Postal code: 385 4
- Area code: +421 43
- Vehicle registration plate (until 2022): MT
- Website: www.krpelany.sk

Krpeľany is a village and municipality in Martin District in the Žilina Region of northern Slovakia.

== History ==
In historical records the village was first mentioned in 1430. Before the establishment of independent Czechoslovakia in 1918, it was part of Turóc County within the Kingdom of Hungary. From 1939 to 1945, it was part of the Slovak Republic.

== Geography ==
The municipality lies at an altitude of 418 metres (1,371 ft) and covers an area of 13.88 km^{2} (5.36 sq mi) (2025).

== Population ==
Population statistic (10 years)
| Year | 1995 | 2005 | 2015 | 2025 |
|---|---|---|---|---|
| Count | 1073 | 1107 | 1101 | 1047 |
| Difference | | +3.16% | −0.54% | −4.90% |

Population statistic
| Year | 2024 | 2025 |
|---|---|---|
| Count | 1059 | 1047 |
| Difference | | −1.13% |

It has a population of 1047 people (31 December 2025).

=== Ethnicity ===
Census 2021 (1+ %)
| Ethnicity | Number | Fraction |
|---|---|---|
| Slovak | 1069 | 98.34% |
| Not found out | 20 | 1.83% |
| Total | 1087 | |

In year 2021 was 1087 people by ethnicity 1069 as Slovak, 20 as Not found out, 4 as German, 3 as Czech, 3 as Other and 1 as Rusyn.

Note on population: The difference values of population numbers in the table "Population statistic" and in the sections "Ethnicity" & "Religion" is caused by the use of various statistical methods.

=== Religion ===
Census 2021 (1+ %)
| Religion | Number | Fraction |
|---|---|---|
| Evangelical Church | 739 | 67.99% |
| None | 138 | 12.7% |
| Roman Catholic Church | 133 | 12.24% |
| Not found out | 39 | 3.59% |
| Christian Congregations in Slovakia | 16 | 1.47% |
| Total | 1087 | |

In year 2021 was 1087 people by religion 739 from Evangelical Church, 138 from None, 133 from Roman Catholic Church, 39 from Not found out, 16 from Christian Congregations in Slovakia, 8 from Greek Catholic Church, 6 from Other and not ascertained christian church, 3 from Calvinist Church, 2 from Other, 2 from Ad hoc movements and 1 from Eastern Orthodox Church.
