= Trnovo, Martin District =

Trnovo
- Municipality
- Flag

- Location of Trnovo in the Žilina Region Location of Trnovo in Slovakia
- Coordinates: 49°01′N 18°52′E
- Country: Slovakia
- Region: Žilina Region
- District: Martin District
- First mentioned: 1256

Area
  - Total: 7.44 km^{2} (2.87 sq mi)
- Elevation: 457 m (1,499 ft)

Population (2025)
  - Total: 261
- Time zone: UTC+1 (CET)
  - Summer (DST): UTC+2 (CEST)
- Postal code: 384 1
- Area code: +421 43
- Vehicle registration plate (until 2022): MT
- Website: www.trnovo.sk

Trnovo (Hungarian: Tarnó) is a village and municipality in Martin District in the Žilina Region of northern Slovakia.

== History ==
In historical records the village was first mentioned in 1256. Before the establishment of independent Czechoslovakia in 1918, it was part of Turóc County within the Kingdom of Hungary. From 1939 to 1945, it was part of the Slovak Republic.

== Geography ==
The municipality lies at an altitude of 457 metres (1,499 ft) and covers an area of 7.44 km^{2} (2.87 sq mi) (2025).

== Population ==
Population statistic (10 years)
Year	1995	2005	2015	2025
Count	183	223	267	261
Difference		+21.85%	+19.73%	−2.24%

Population statistic
Year	2024	2025
Count	269	261
Difference		−2.97%

It has a population of 261 people (31 December 2025).

=== Ethnicity ===
Census 2021 (1+ %)
Ethnicity	Number	Fraction
Slovak	267	95.35%
Not found out	15	5.35%
Total	280	

In year 2021 was 280 people by ethnicity 267 as Slovak, 15 as Not found out, 2 as Czech, 1 as Ukrainian and 1 as Rusyn.

Note on population: The difference values of population numbers in the table "Population statistic" and in the sections "Ethnicity" & "Religion" is caused by the use of various statistical methods.

=== Religion ===
Census 2021 (1+ %)
Religion	Number	Fraction
None	100	35.71%
Roman Catholic Church	86	30.71%
Evangelical Church	78	27.86%
Not found out	14	5%
Total	280	

In year 2021 was 280 people by religion 100 from None, 86 from Roman Catholic Church, 78 from Evangelical Church, 14 from Not found out, 1 from Eastern Orthodox Church and 1 from Christian Congregations in Slovakia.
