= Folkušová =

- Municipality
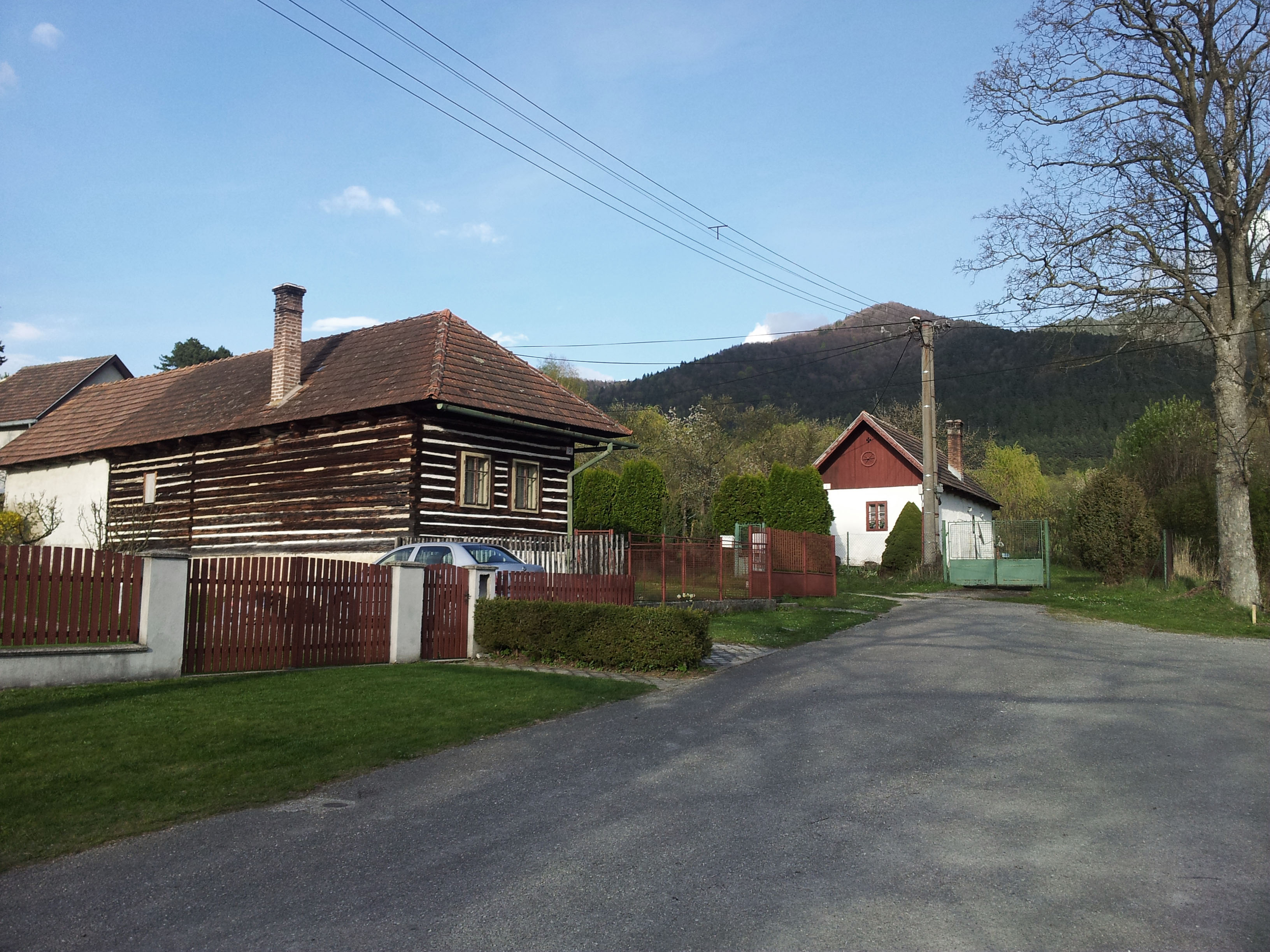

- Flag

- Location of Folkušová in the Žilina Region Location of Folkušová in Slovakia
- Coordinates: 48.97°N 18.95°E
- Country: Slovakia
- Region: Žilina Region
- District: Martin District
- First mentioned: 1331

Area
  - Total: 6.01 km^{2} (2.32 sq mi)
- Elevation: 516 m (1,693 ft)

Population (2025)
  - Total: 156
- Time zone: UTC+1 (CET)
  - Summer (DST): UTC+2 (CEST)
- Postal code: 038 42
- Area code: +421 43
- Vehicle registration plate (until 2022): MT
- Website: www.folkusova.sk

Folkušová (Hungarian: Folkusfalva) is a village and municipality in Martin District in the Žilina Region of northern Slovakia.

== History ==
In historical records the village was first mentioned in 1331, as Villa Folkus. It belonged to a comes named Folkuš and later to several families of the lesser nobility. Before the establishment of independent Czechoslovakia in 1918, it was part of Turóc County within the Kingdom of Hungary. From 1939 to 1945, it was part of the Slovak Republic. The villagers lived from farming, and furriery, basket making and weaving were also practised. During the Slovak National Uprising in 1944, a partisan headquarters was based in the village.

== Geography ==
The municipality lies at an altitude of 516 metres (1,693 ft) and covers an area of 6.01 km^{2} (2.32 sq mi) (2025).

== Population ==
Population statistic (10 years)
Year	1995	2005	2015	2025
Count	129	129	141	156
Difference		+0%	+9.30%	+10.63%

Population statistic
Year	2024	2025
Count	158	156
Difference		−1.26%

It has a population of 156 people (31 December 2025).

=== Ethnicity ===
Census 2021 (1+%)
Ethnicity	Number	Fraction
Slovak	146	97.33%
Not found out	5	3.33%
German	2	1.33%
Total	150	

In year 2021 was 150 people by ethnicity 146 as Slovak, 5 as Not found out, 2 as German, 1 as Czech and 1 as Austrian.

Note on population: The difference values of population numbers in the table "Population statistic" and in the sections "Ethnicity" & "Religion" is caused by the use of various statistical methods.

=== Religion ===
Census 2021 (1+%)
Religion	Number	Fraction
Evangelical Church	69	46%
None	43	28.67%
Roman Catholic Church	32	21.33%
Not found out	6	4%
Total	150	

In year 2021 was 150 people by religion 69 from Evangelical Church, 43 from None, 32 from Roman Catholic Church and 6 from Not found out.

== Genealogical resources ==
The records for genealogical research are available at the state archive "Statny Archiv in Bytca, Slovakia".

- Roman Catholic church records (births/marriages/deaths): 1777–1949 (parish B)
- Lutheran church records (births/marriages/deaths): 1689–1895 (parish B)

== See also ==
- List of municipalities and towns in Slovakia
