= Turčiansky Peter =

- Municipality
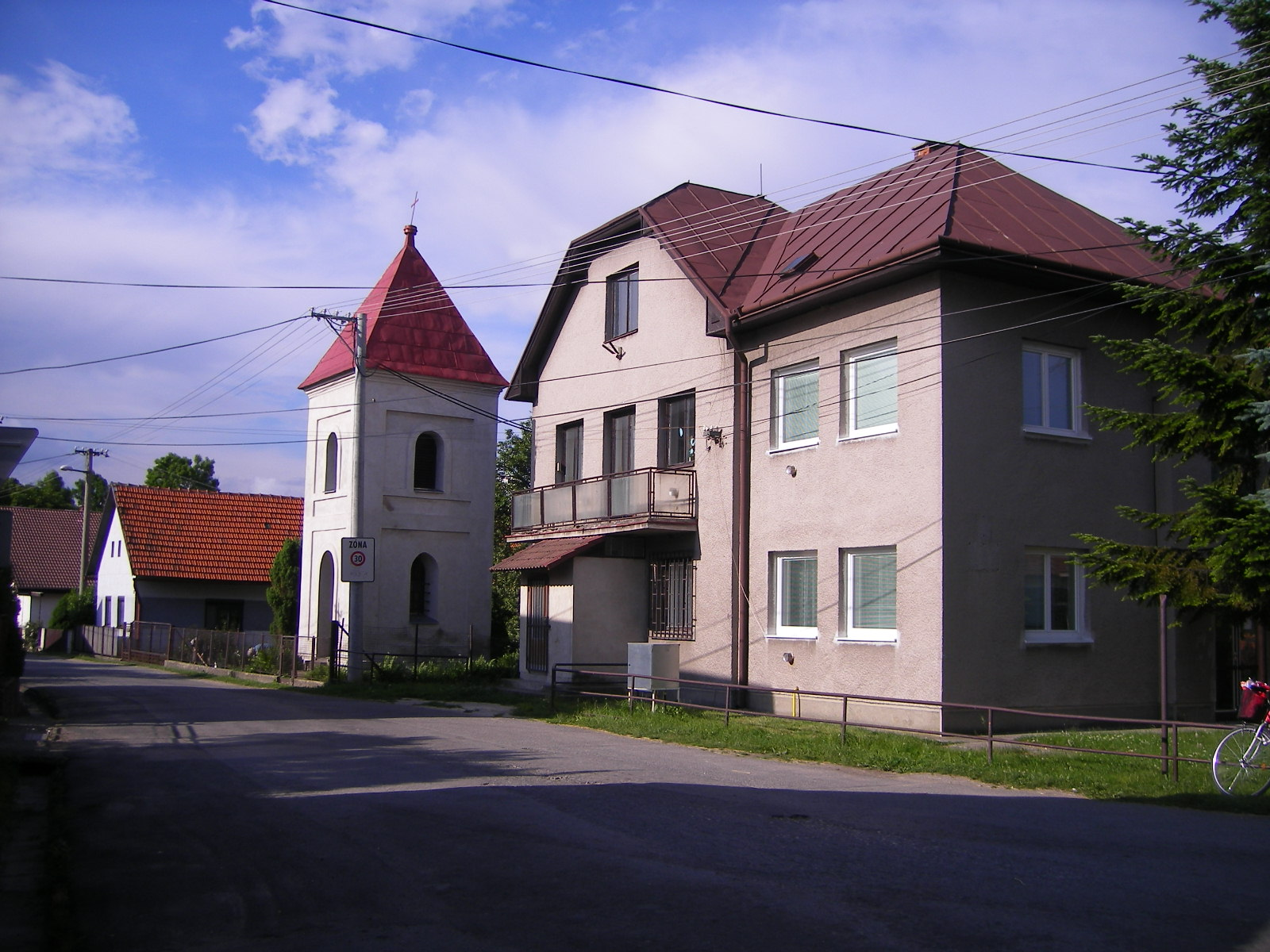

- Flag

- Location of Turčiansky Peter in the Žilina Region Location of Turčiansky Peter in Slovakia
- Coordinates: 49.03°N 18.89°E
- Country: Slovakia
- Region: Žilina Region
- District: Martin District
- First mentioned: 1309

Area
  - Total: 4.61 km^{2} (1.78 sq mi)
- Elevation: 419 m (1,375 ft)

Population (2025)
  - Total: 574
- Time zone: UTC+1 (CET)
  - Summer (DST): UTC+2 (CEST)
- Postal code: 384 1
- Area code: +421 43
- Vehicle registration plate (until 2022): MT
- Website: www.turcianskypeter.sk

Turčiansky Peter is a village and municipality in the Martin District of the Žilina Region in northern Slovakia. Situated in the central Turiec Basin just a few kilometers south of the district capital Martin, it is a quiet rural settlement with a population of roughly 500–600 residents. First mentioned in written records in 1309, the village takes its name from Saint Peter, the patron of its historic local church, and is surrounded by the scenic Lesser and Greater Fatra mountain ranges.

== History ==
In historical records the village was first mentioned in 1309. Before the establishment of independent Czechoslovakia in 1918, it was part of Turóc County within the Kingdom of Hungary. From 1939 to 1945, it was part of the Slovak Republic.

== Geography ==
The municipality lies at an altitude of 419 metres (1,375 ft) and covers an area of 4.61 km^{2} (1.78 sq mi) (2025).

== Population ==
Population statistic (10 years)
Year	1995	2005	2015	2025
Count	250	331	469	574
Difference		+32.4%	+41.69%	+22.38%

Population statistic
Year	2024	2025
Count	587	574
Difference		−2.21%

It has a population of 574 people (31 December 2025).

=== Ethnicity ===
Census 2021 (1+%)
Ethnicity	Number	Fraction
Slovak	489	91.23%
Not found out	42	7.83%
Czech	7	1.3%
Total	536	

In year 2021 was 536 people by ethnicity 489 as Slovak, 42 as Not found out, 7 as Czech, 3 as Austrian, 2 as Rusyn, 2 as Polish, 2 as Other, 1 as Turkish and 1 as German.

Note on population: The difference values of population numbers in the table "Population statistic" and in the sections "Ethnicity" & "Religion" is caused by the use of various statistical methods.

=== Religion ===
Census 2021 (1+%)
Religion	Number	Fraction
Roman Catholic Church	253	47.2%
None	178	33.21%
Evangelical Church	46	8.58%
Not found out	44	8.21%
Ad hoc movements	6	1.12%
Total	536	

In year 2021 was 536 people by religion 253 from Roman Catholic Church, 178 from None, 46 from Evangelical Church, 44 from Not found out, 6 from Ad hoc movements, 5 from Greek Catholic Church, 1 from Islam, 1 from Other, 1 from Hinduism and 1 from United Methodist Church.
