= Turčianske Jaseno =

- Municipality
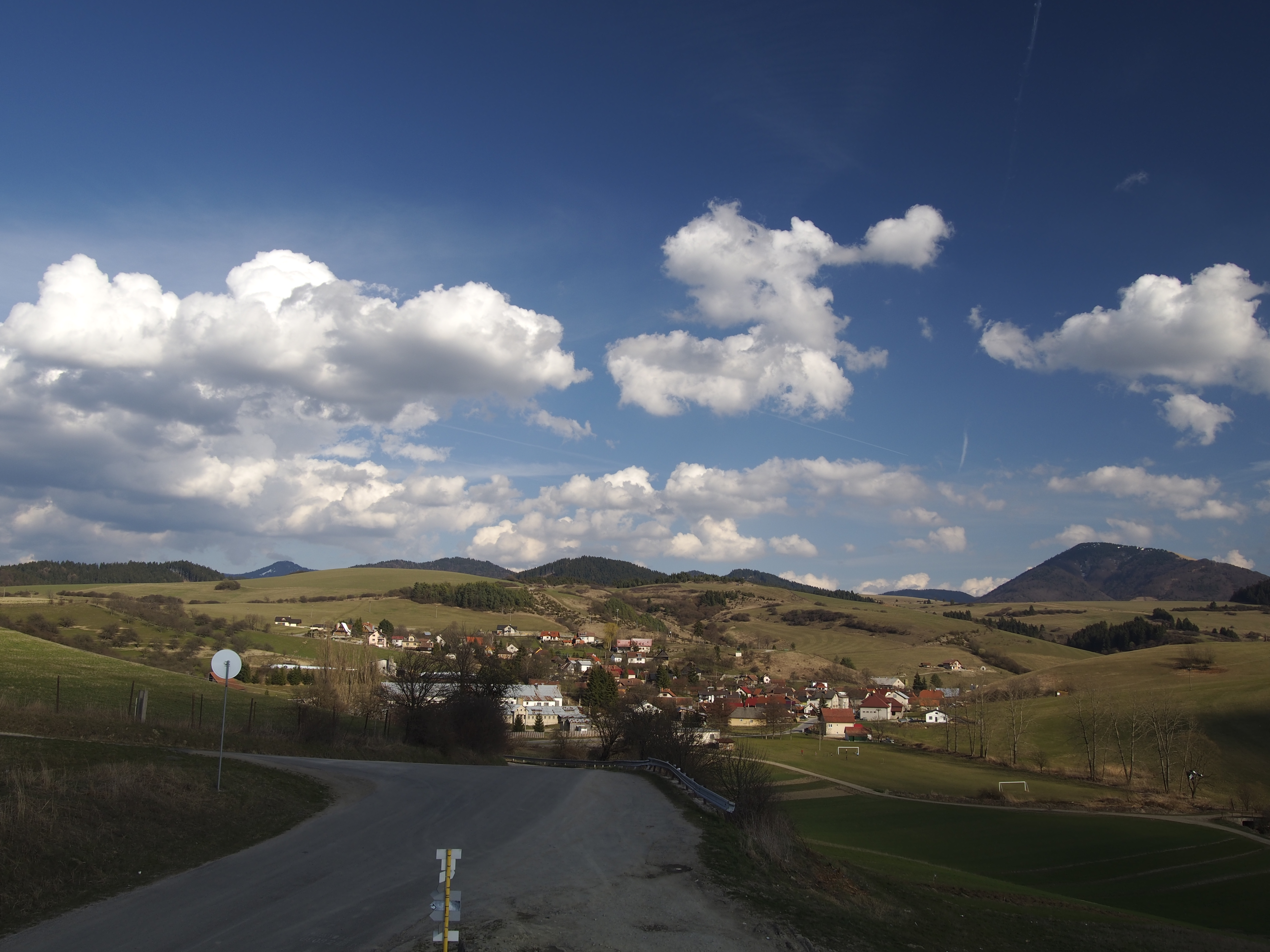

- Flag

- Location of Turčianske Jaseno in the Žilina Region Location of Turčianske Jaseno in Slovakia
- Coordinates: 49.02°N 18.99°E
- Country: Slovakia
- Region: Žilina Region
- District: Martin District
- First mentioned: 1274

Area
  - Total: 20.46 km^{2} (7.90 sq mi)
- Elevation: 508 m (1,667 ft)

Population (2025)
  - Total: 478
- Time zone: UTC+1 (CET)
  - Summer (DST): UTC+2 (CEST)
- Postal code: 380 2
- Area code: +421 43
- Vehicle registration plate (until 2022): MT
- Website: www.turcianskejaseno.sk

Turčianske Jaseno (Hungarian: Turócjeszen) is a village and municipality in Martin District in the Žilina Region of northern Slovakia.

== Etymology ==
The name is derived from Slovak jaseň (ash tree). Jaseno means "place overgrown with ash trees".

== History ==
In historical records the settlement was first mentioned in 1274 as Jezen, Jescen. The original settlement developed into two villages. Horné Jaseno and Dolné Jaseno merged to Turčianske Jaseno in 1973. Before the establishment of independent Czechoslovakia in 1918, it was part of Turóc County within the Kingdom of Hungary. From 1939 to 1945, it was part of the Slovak Republic.

== Geography ==
The municipality lies at an altitude of 508 metres (1,667 ft) and covers an area of 20.46 km^{2} (7.90 sq mi) (2025).

== Population ==
Population statistic (10 years)
Year	1995	2005	2015	2025
Count	338	356	376	478
Difference		+5.32%	+5.61%	+27.12%

Population statistic
Year	2024	2025
Count	478	478
Difference		+0%

It has a population of 478 people (31 December 2025).

=== Ethnicity ===
Census 2021 (1+ %)
Ethnicity	Number	Fraction
Slovak	409	97.61%
Other	11	2.62%
Not found out	5	1.19%
Total	419	

In year 2021 was 419 people by ethnicity 409 as Slovak, 11 as Other, 5 as Not found out, 2 as Czech, 1 as Romani, 1 as Polish and 1 as German.

Note on population: The difference values of population numbers in the table "Population statistic" and in the sections "Ethnicity" & "Religion" is caused by the use of various statistical methods.

=== Religion ===
Census 2021 (1+ %)
Religion	Number	Fraction
Evangelical Church	248	59.19%
None	96	22.91%
Roman Catholic Church	63	15.04%
Total	419	

In year 2021 was 419 people by religion 248 from Evangelical Church, 96 from None, 63 from Roman Catholic Church, 4 from Not found out, 3 from Ad hoc movements, 2 from Other, 1 from Paganism and natural spirituality, 1 from Greek Catholic Church and 1 from Apostolic Church.
