= Ležiachov =

- Municipality
- Flag

- Location of Ležiachov in the Žilina Region Location of Ležiachov in Slovakia
- Coordinates: 48.98°N 18.86°E
- Country: Slovakia
- Region: Žilina Region
- District: Martin District
- First mentioned: 1252

Area
  - Total: 4.23 km^{2} (1.63 sq mi)
- Elevation: 439 m (1,440 ft)

Population (2025)
  - Total: 163
- Time zone: UTC+1 (CET)
  - Summer (DST): UTC+2 (CEST)
- Postal code: 384 2
- Area code: +421 43
- Vehicle registration plate (until 2022): MT
- Website: www.obecleziachov.sk

Ležiachov (Hungarian: Lézsa) is a village and municipality in Martin District in the Žilina Region of northern Slovakia.

== History ==
In historical records the village was first mentioned in 1252. Before the establishment of independent Czechoslovakia in 1918, it was part of Turóc County within the Kingdom of Hungary. From 1939 to 1945, it was part of the Slovak Republic.

== Geography ==
The municipality lies at an altitude of 439 metres (1,440 ft) and covers an area of 4.23 km^{2} (1.63 sq mi) (2025).

== Population ==
Population statistic (10 years)
Year	1995	2005	2015	2025
Count	132	141	160	163
Difference		+6.81%	+13.47%	+1.87%

Population statistic
Year	2024	2025
Count	164	163
Difference		−0.60%

It has a population of 163 people (31 December 2025).

=== Ethnicity ===
Census 2021 (1+ %)
Ethnicity	Number	Fraction
Slovak	154	99.35%
Czech	3	1.93%
Total	155	

In year 2021 was 155 people by ethnicity 154 as Slovak, 3 as Czech and 1 as Not found out.

Note on population: The difference values of population numbers in the table "Population statistic" and in the sections "Ethnicity" & "Religion" is caused by the use of various statistical methods.

=== Religion ===
Census 2021 (1+ %)
Religion	Number	Fraction
Roman Catholic Church	83	53.55%
None	51	32.9%
Evangelical Church	11	7.1%
Ad hoc movements	5	3.23%
Paganism and natural spirituality	3	1.94%
Total	155	

In year 2021 was 155 people by religion 83 from Roman Catholic Church, 51 from None, 11 from Evangelical Church, 5 from Ad hoc movements, 3 from Paganism and natural spirituality, 1 from Other and not ascertained christian church and 1 from Buddhism.
