= Martin District =

Coordinates: 49°3′46″N 18°55′19″E

- District
- Country: Slovakia
- Region (kraj): Žilina Region
- Cultural region: Turiec
- Seat: Martin

Area
  - Total: 735.63 km^{2} (284.03 sq mi)

Population (2025)
  - Total: 92,401
- Time zone: UTC+1 (CET)
  - Summer (DST): UTC+2 (CEST)
- Telephone prefix: 043
- Vehicle registration plate (until 2022): MT
- Municipalities: 43

Martin District (okres Martin) is a district in the Žilina Region of central Slovakia. Its main cultural, economic and administrative seat is the city of Martin. Martin District is one of the most important cultural centers in Slovakia. The city of Martin is the location and seat of the largest Slovak library, the Slovak National Museum, the cultural organisation Matica Slovenská and the Slovak Red Cross. In the district are 16 sport clubs, including ice hockey, football and handball, which all have their separate sport halls. Martin District economy is based foremost on the engineering industry, but also on the wood processing, construction, paper and cellulose industries.

== Population ==
Population statistic (10 years)
Year	1995	2005	2015	2025
Count	97,835	97,608	96,761	92,401
Difference		−0.23%	−0.86%	−4.50%

Population statistic
Year	2024	2025
Count	92,817	92,401
Difference		−0.44%

It has a population of 92,401 people (31 December 2025).

Historical population
Year	Pop.	±%
1970	73,752	—
1980	87,589	+18.8%
1991	95,908	+9.5%
2001	97,813	+2.0%
2011	97,110	−0.7%
2021	94,376	−2.8%
Source: Statistical Office of the Slovak Republic

=== Ethnicity ===
Census 2021 (1+ %)
Ethnicity	Number	Fraction
Slovak	88,733	91.67%
Not found out	4673	4.82%
Czech	1189	1.22%
Total	96,790	

In year 2021 was 96,790 people by ethnicity 88,733 as Slovak, 4673 as Not found out, 1189 as Czech, 631 as Romani, 412 as Other, 213 as Hungarian, 157 as Rusyn, 142 as Russian, 130 as German, 92 as Polish, 52 as Moravian, 43 as Ukrainian, 30 as Bulgarian, 29 as Vietnamese, 28 as Italian, 27 as English, 24 as Jewish, 22 as Serbian, 22 as Romanian, 20 as Chinese, 19 as Irish, 18 as Croatian, 17 as French, 16 as Austrian, 14 as Turkish, 14 as Iranian, 12 as Canadian, 4 as Silesian, 4 as Greek, 2 as Albanian and 1 as Korean.

Note on population: The difference values of population numbers in the table "Population statistic" and in the sections "Ethnicity" & "Religion" is caused by the use of various statistical methods.

=== Religion ===
Census 2021 (1+ %)
Religion	Number	Fraction
None	36,114	38.27%
Roman Catholic Church	31,157	33.01%
Evangelical Church	17,685	18.74%
Not found out	6335	6.71%
Total	94,376	

In year 2021 was 94,376 people by religion 36,114 from None, 31,157 from Roman Catholic Church, 17,685 from Evangelical Church, 6335 from Not found out, 676 from Greek Catholic Church, 367 from Ad hoc movements, 366 from Other and not ascertained christian church, 319 from Other, 273 from Christian Congregations in Slovakia, 135 from Eastern Orthodox Church, 132 from Jehovah's Witnesses, 117 from Buddhism, 114 from Islam, 111 from Paganism and natural spirituality, 109 from United Methodist Church, 89 from Seventh-day Adventist Church, 74 from Apostolic Church, 52 from Calvinist Church, 41 from Hinduism, 41 from Czechoslovak Hussite Church, 23 from Old Catholic Church, 19 from Jewish community, 18 from Church of the Brethren, 5 from Church of Jesus Christ of Latter-day Saints, 2 from Baptists Church and 2 from Bahá'i Community.

== Municipalities ==
Municipality	Area [km^{2}]	Population
Belá-Dulice	51.17	1,246
Benice	2.15	336
Blatnica	86.18	1,065
Bystrička	19.12	1,495
Ďanová	7.66	546
Diaková	2.42	595
Dolný Kalník	1.29	365
Dražkovce	4.42	1,063
Folkušová	6.01	156
Horný Kalník	2.05	204
Karlová	1.83	112
Kláštor pod Znievom	39.02	1,836
Košťany nad Turcom	6.43	1,492
Krpeľany	13.88	1,047
Laskár	3.34	135
Ležiachov	4.23	163
Lipovec	12.75	896
Martin	67.73	50,153
Necpaly	42.17	1,017
Nolčovo	15.01	248
Podhradie	16.39	672
Príbovce	5.97	1,096
Rakovo	5.41	422
Ratkovo	0.90	213
Sklabiňa	11.06	646
Sklabinský Podzámok	27.14	179
Slovany	14.30	435
Socovce	5.10	234
Sučany	33.26	4,702
Šútovo	16.62	498
Trebostovo	13.12	642
Trnovo	7.44	261
Turany	46.74	4,054
Turčianska Štiavnička	14.07	994
Turčianske Jaseno	20.46	478
Turčianske Kľačany	12.20	1,050
Turčiansky Ďur	0.93	153
Turčiansky Peter	4.61	574
Valča	32.23	1,803
Vrícko	29.57	440
Vrútky	18.65	7,333
Záborie	5.19	174
Žabokreky	5.23	1,178

Population and area values are current for year 2025.
