= Ratkovo, Slovakia =

Ratkovo
- Municipality
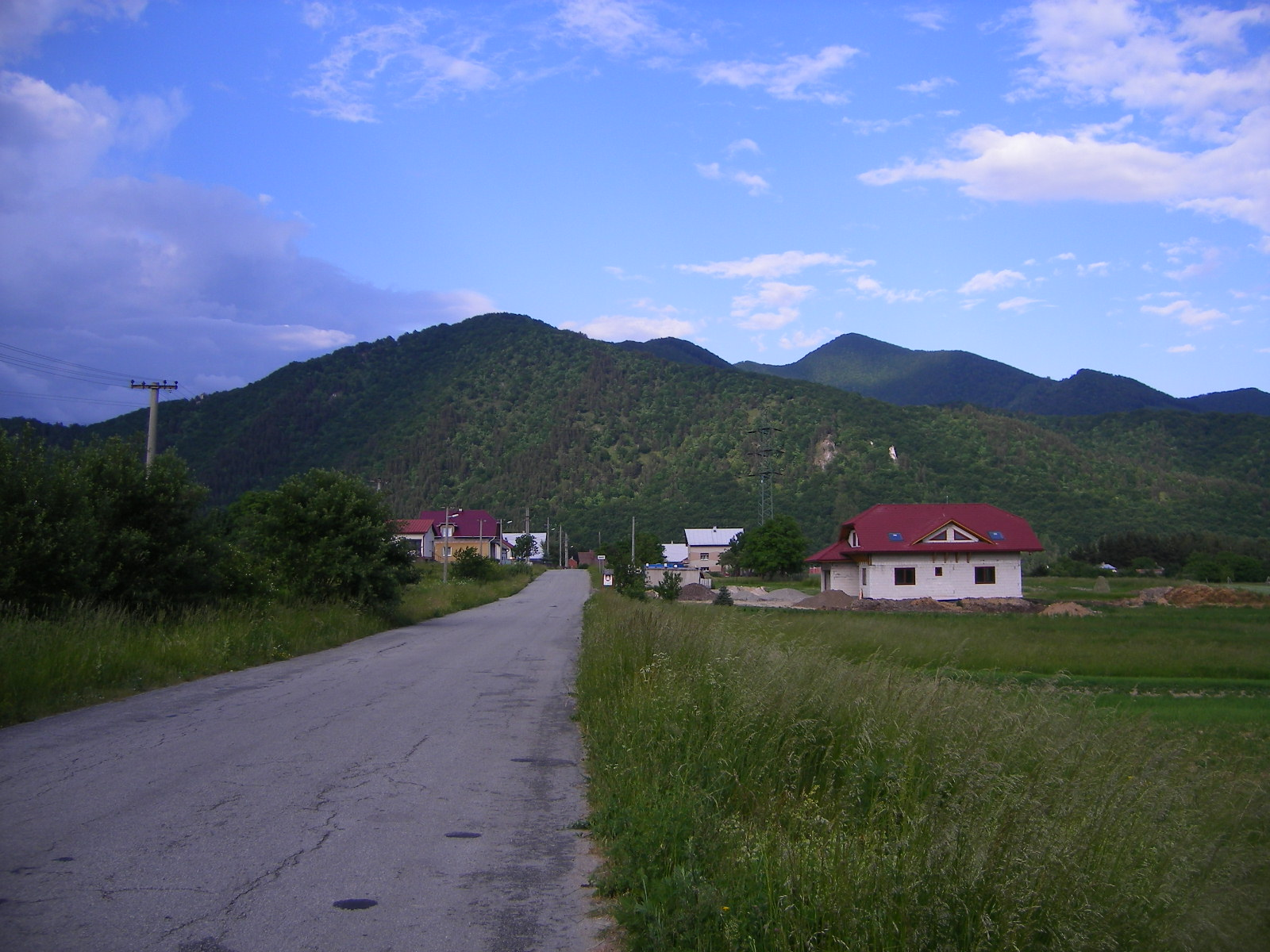

- Flag

- Location of Ratkovo in the Žilina Region Location of Ratkovo in Slovakia
- Coordinates: 49°08′N 19°05′E
- Country: Slovakia
- Region: Žilina Region
- District: Martin District
- First mentioned: 1489

Area
  - Total: 0.90 km^{2} (0.35 sq mi)
- Elevation: 452 m (1,483 ft)

Population (2025)
  - Total: 213
- Time zone: UTC+1 (CET)
  - Summer (DST): UTC+2 (CEST)
- Postal code: 385 4
- Area code: +421 43
- Vehicle registration plate (until 2022): MT
- Website: www.ratkovo.sk

Ratkovo (Hungarian: Vágratkó) is a village and municipality in Martin District in the Žilina Region of northern Slovakia.

== History ==
In historical records the village was first mentioned in 1489. Before the establishment of independent Czechoslovakia in 1918, it was part of Turóc County within the Kingdom of Hungary. From 1939 to 1945, it was part of the Slovak Republic.

== Geography ==
The municipality lies at an altitude of 452 metres (1,483 ft) and covers an area of 0.90 km^{2} (0.35 sq mi) (2025).

== Population ==
Population statistic (10 years)
Year	1995	2005	2015	2025
Count	178	182	185	213
Difference		+2.24%	+1.64%	+15.13%

Population statistic
Year	2024	2025
Count	213	213
Difference		+0%

It has a population of 213 people (31 December 2025).

=== Ethnicity ===
Census 2021 (1+ %)
Ethnicity	Number	Fraction
Slovak	192	98.96%
Total	194	

In year 2021 was 194 people by ethnicity 192 as Slovak, 1 as Not found out and 1 as Hungarian.

Note on population: The difference values of population numbers in the table "Population statistic" and in the sections "Ethnicity" & "Religion" is caused by the use of various statistical methods.

=== Religion ===
Census 2021 (1+ %)
Religion	Number	Fraction
Evangelical Church	131	67.53%
Roman Catholic Church	31	15.98%
None	19	9.79%
Other and not ascertained christian church	5	2.58%
Christian Congregations in Slovakia	4	2.06%
Greek Catholic Church	2	1.03%
Total	194	

In year 2021 was 194 people by religion 131 from Evangelical Church, 31 from Roman Catholic Church, 19 from None, 5 from Other and not ascertained christian church, 4 from Christian Congregations in Slovakia, 2 from Greek Catholic Church, 1 from Not found out and 1 from Buddhism.
