= Valča =

- Municipality
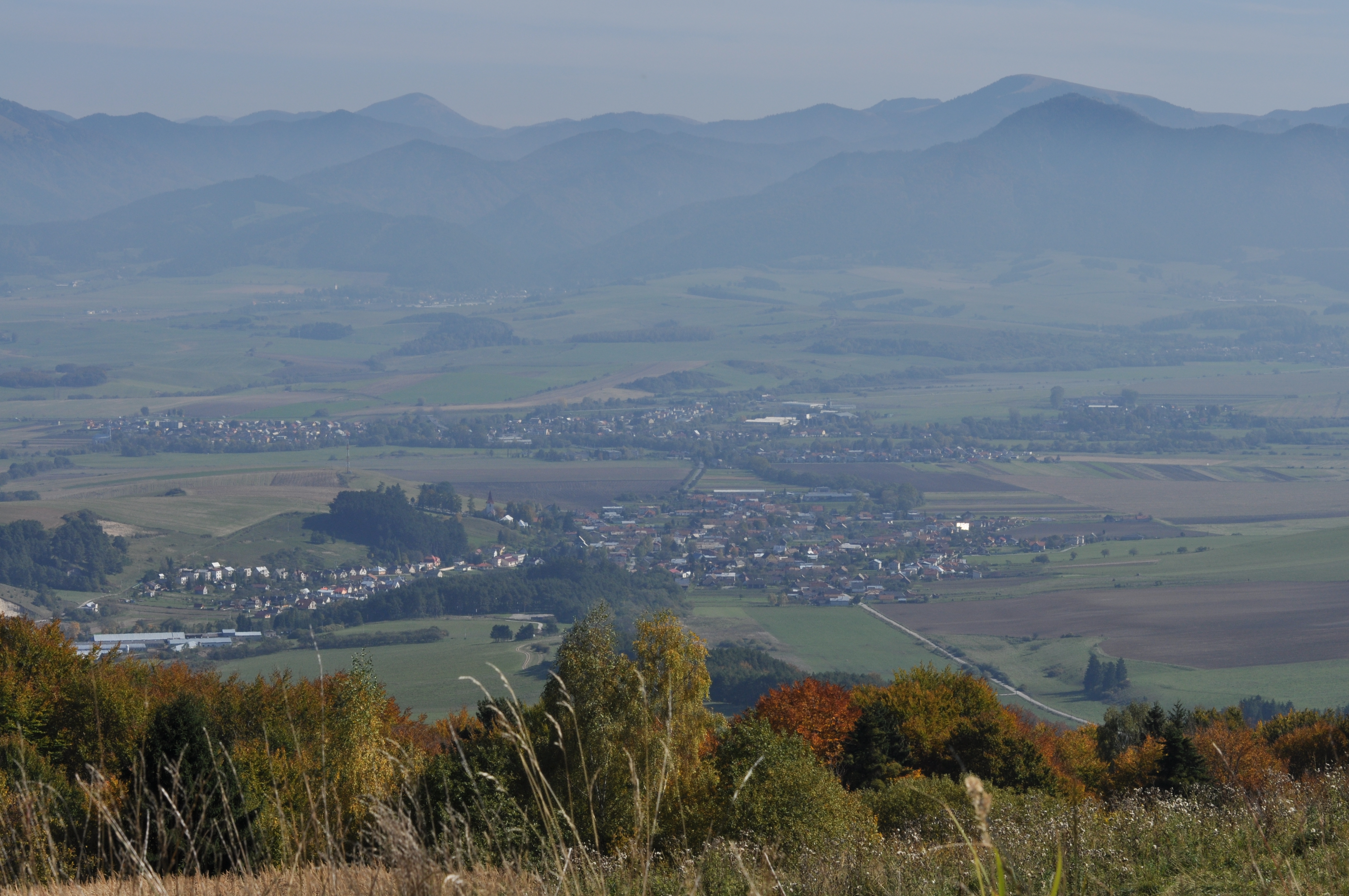

- Flag

- Location of Valča in the Žilina Region Location of Valča in Slovakia
- Coordinates: 49.00°N 18.85°E
- Country: Slovakia
- Region: Žilina Region
- District: Martin District
- First mentioned: 1252

Area
  - Total: 32.23 km^{2} (12.44 sq mi)
- Elevation: 448 m (1,470 ft)

Population (2025)
  - Total: 1,803
- Time zone: UTC+1 (CET)
  - Summer (DST): UTC+2 (CEST)
- Postal code: 383 5
- Area code: +421 43
- Vehicle registration plate (until 2022): MT
- Website: www.obecvalca.sk

Valča (Hungarian: Valcsa) is a village and municipality in Martin District in the Žilina Region of northern Slovakia.

== History ==
In historical records the village was first mentioned in 1252. Before the establishment of independent Czechoslovakia in 1918, it was part of Turóc County within the Kingdom of Hungary. From 1939 to 1945, it was part of the Slovak Republic.

== Geography ==
The municipality lies at an altitude of 448 metres (1,470 ft) and covers an area of 32.23 km^{2} (12.44 sq mi) (2025).

== Population ==
Population statistic (10 years)
Year	1995	2005	2015	2025
Count	1397	1500	1638	1803
Difference		+7.37%	+9.2%	+10.07%

Population statistic
Year	2024	2025
Count	1802	1803
Difference		+0.05%

It has a population of 1803 people (31 December 2025).

=== Ethnicity ===
Census 2021 (1+ %)
Ethnicity	Number	Fraction
Slovak	1694	96.25%
Not found out	52	2.95%
Czech	23	1.3%
Total	1760	

In year 2021 was 1760 people by ethnicity 1694 as Slovak, 52 as Not found out, 23 as Czech, 7 as Other, 6 as Russian, 4 as Polish, 3 as Rusyn, 3 as Hungarian, 1 as Jewish, 1 as Turkish, 1 as Silesian, 1 as Romani, 1 as Moravian, 1 as French, 1 as Bulgarian and 1 as English.

Note on population: The difference values of population numbers in the table "Population statistic" and in the sections "Ethnicity" & "Religion" is caused by the use of various statistical methods.

=== Religion ===
Census 2021 (1+ %)
Religion	Number	Fraction
Roman Catholic Church	1076	61.14%
None	475	26.99%
Evangelical Church	121	6.88%
Not found out	51	2.9%
Total	1760	

In year 2021 was 1760 people by religion 1076 from Roman Catholic Church, 475 from None, 121 from Evangelical Church, 51 from Not found out, 12 from Greek Catholic Church, 11 from Christian Congregations in Slovakia, 5 from Paganism and natural spirituality, 4 from Ad hoc movements, 3 from Buddhism, 1 from Other and 1 from Czechoslovak Hussite Church.
