= Vrícko =

- Municipality
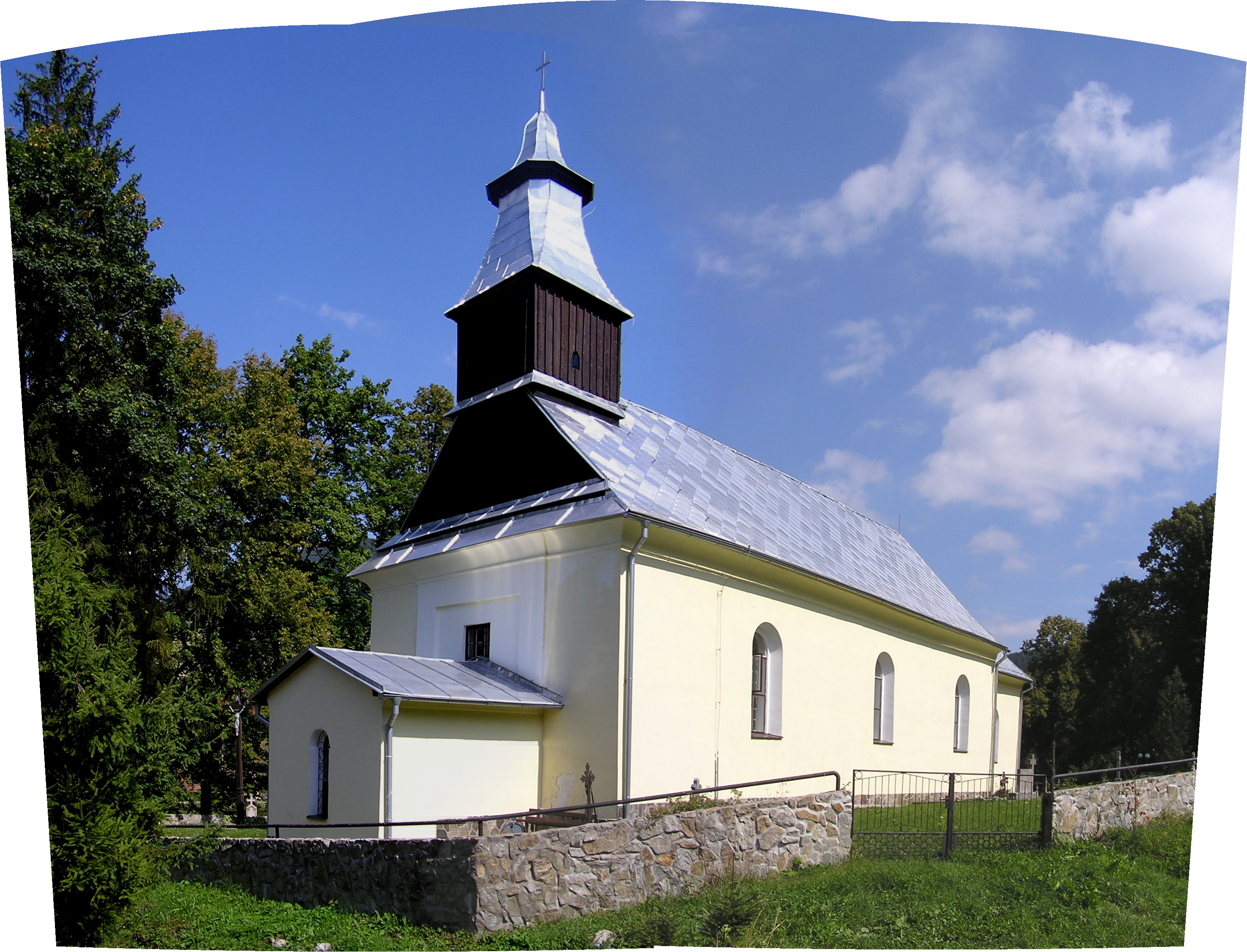

- Flag

- Location of Vrícko in the Žilina Region Location of Vrícko in Slovakia
- Coordinates: 48.97°N 18.70°E
- Country: Slovakia
- Region: Žilina Region
- District: Martin District
- First mentioned: 1594

Area
  - Total: 29.57 km^{2} (11.42 sq mi)
- Elevation: 588 m (1,929 ft)

Population (2025)
  - Total: 440
- Time zone: UTC+1 (CET)
  - Summer (DST): UTC+2 (CEST)
- Postal code: 383 1
- Area code: +421 43
- Vehicle registration plate (until 2022): MT
- Website: www.vricko.sk

Vrícko (German: Münnichwies(en); Hungarian: Turócremete, formerly Vric(z)kó) is a village and municipality in Martin District in the Žilina Region of northern Slovakia.

== History ==
In historical records the village was first mentioned in 1594. Before the establishment of independent Czechoslovakia in 1918, it was part of Turóc County within the Kingdom of Hungary. From 1939 to 1945, it was part of the Slovak Republic.

The village once belonged to the German language island of Hauerland but the majority of the German population was expelled at the end of World War II.

== Geography ==
The municipality lies at an altitude of 588 metres (1,929 ft) and covers an area of 29.57 km^{2} (11.42 sq mi) (2025).

== Population ==
Population statistic (10 years)
Year	1995	2005	2015	2025
Count	380	435	453	440
Difference		+14.47%	+4.13%	−2.86%

Population statistic
Year	2024	2025
Count	433	440
Difference		+1.61%

It has a population of 440 people (31 December 2025).

=== Ethnicity ===
Census 2021 (1+ %)
Ethnicity	Number	Fraction
Slovak	421	95.68%
Not found out	17	3.86%
Total	440	

In year 2021 was 440 people by ethnicity 421 as Slovak, 17 as Not found out, 4 as Hungarian, 2 as Czech, 1 as Polish, 1 as German, 1 as Other and 1 as French.

Note on population: The difference values of population numbers in the table "Population statistic" and in the sections "Ethnicity" & "Religion" is caused by the use of various statistical methods.

=== Religion ===
Census 2021 (1+ %)
Religion	Number	Fraction
Roman Catholic Church	329	74.77%
None	68	15.45%
Evangelical Church	18	4.09%
Not found out	16	3.64%
Total	440	

In year 2021 was 440 people by religion 329 from Roman Catholic Church, 68 from None, 18 from Evangelical Church, 16 from Not found out, 2 from Greek Catholic Church, 2 from United Methodist Church, 1 from Calvinist Church, 1 from Other, 1 from Hinduism, 1 from Czechoslovak Hussite Church and 1 from Ad hoc movements.
