= Horný Kalník =

- Municipality
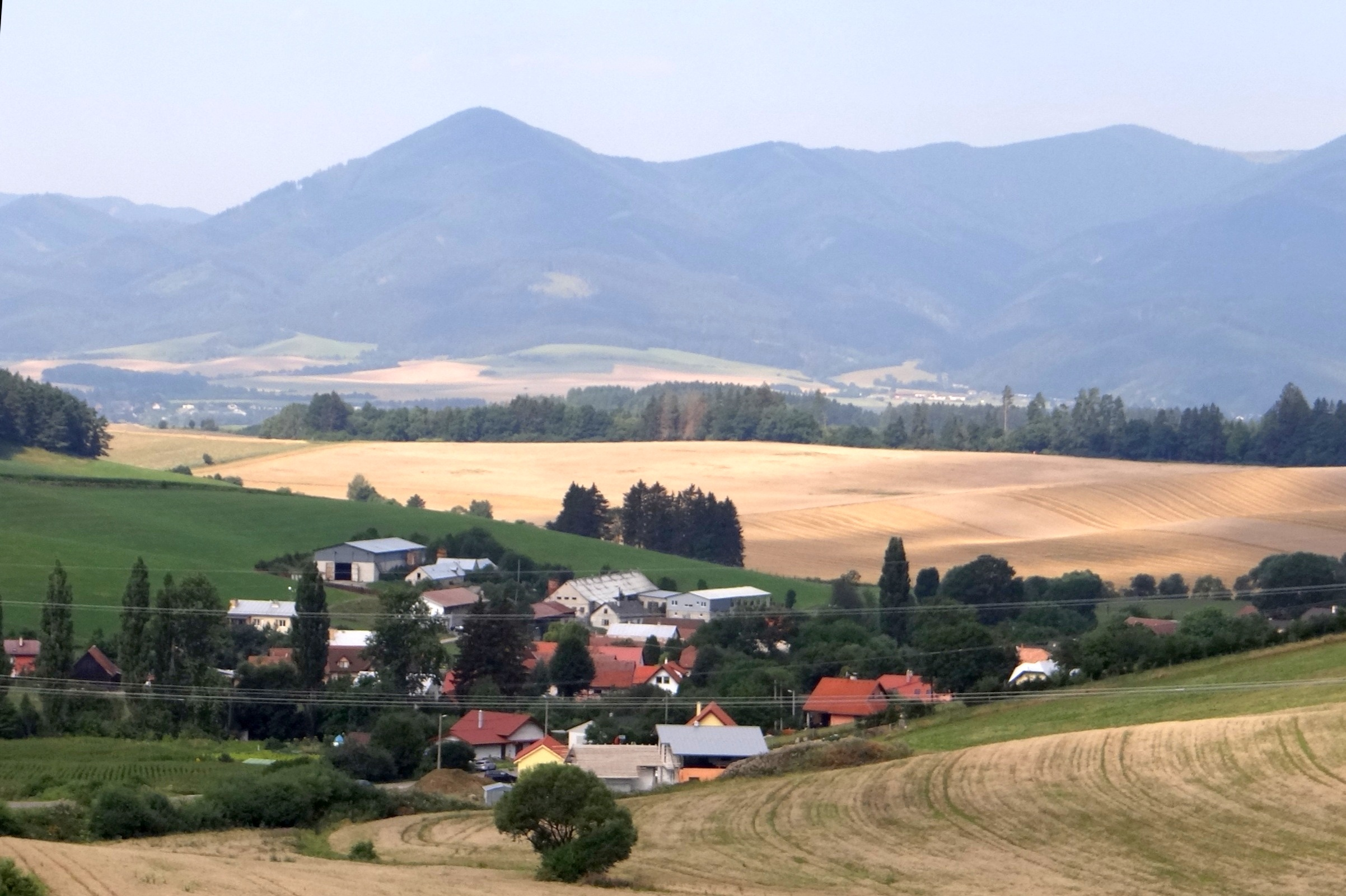

- Flag

- Location of Horný Kalník in the Žilina Region Location of Horný Kalník in Slovakia
- Coordinates: 49.03°N 18.97°E
- Country: Slovakia
- Region: Žilina Region
- District: Martin District
- First mentioned: 1375

Area
  - Total: 2.05 km^{2} (0.79 sq mi)
- Elevation: 445 m (1,460 ft)

Population (2025)
  - Total: 204
- Time zone: UTC+1 (CET)
  - Summer (DST): UTC+2 (CEST)
- Postal code: 380 2
- Area code: +421 43
- Vehicle registration plate (until 2022): MT
- Website: www.hornykalnik.sk

Horný Kalník (Hungarian: Felsőkálnok) is a village and municipality in Martin District in the Žilina Region of northern Slovakia.

== History ==
In historical records the village was first mentioned in 1375. Before the establishment of independent Czechoslovakia in 1918, it was part of Turóc County within the Kingdom of Hungary. From 1939 to 1945, it was part of the Slovak Republic.

== Geography ==
The municipality lies at an altitude of 445 metres (1,460 ft) and covers an area of 2.05 km^{2} (0.79 sq mi) (2025).

== Population ==
Population statistic (10 years)
Year	1995	2005	2015	2025
Count	112	155	180	204
Difference		+38.39%	+16.12%	+13.33%

Population statistic
Year	2024	2025
Count	197	204
Difference		+3.55%

It has a population of 204 people (31 December 2025).

=== Ethnicity ===
Census 2021 (1+ %)
Ethnicity	Number	Fraction
Slovak	185	99.46%
Total	186	

In year 2021 was 186 people by ethnicity 185 as Slovak, 1 as Rusyn and 1 as Not found out.

Note on population: The difference values of population numbers in the table "Population statistic" and in the sections "Ethnicity" & "Religion" is caused by the use of various statistical methods.

=== Religion ===
Census 2021 (1+ %)
Religion	Number	Fraction
Evangelical Church	90	48.39%
Roman Catholic Church	48	25.81%
None	43	23.12%
Greek Catholic Church	2	1.08%
Ad hoc movements	2	1.08%
Total	186	

In year 2021 was 186 people by religion 90 from Evangelical Church, 48 from Roman Catholic Church, 43 from None, 2 from Greek Catholic Church, 2 from Ad hoc movements and 1 from Not found out.

== Genealogical resources ==
The records for genealogical research are available at the state archive "Statny Archiv in Bytca, Slovakia"

- Lutheran church records (births/marriages/deaths): 1783-1896 (parish B)

== See also ==
- List of municipalities and towns in Slovakia
