= Podhradie, Martin District =

Podhradie
- Municipality
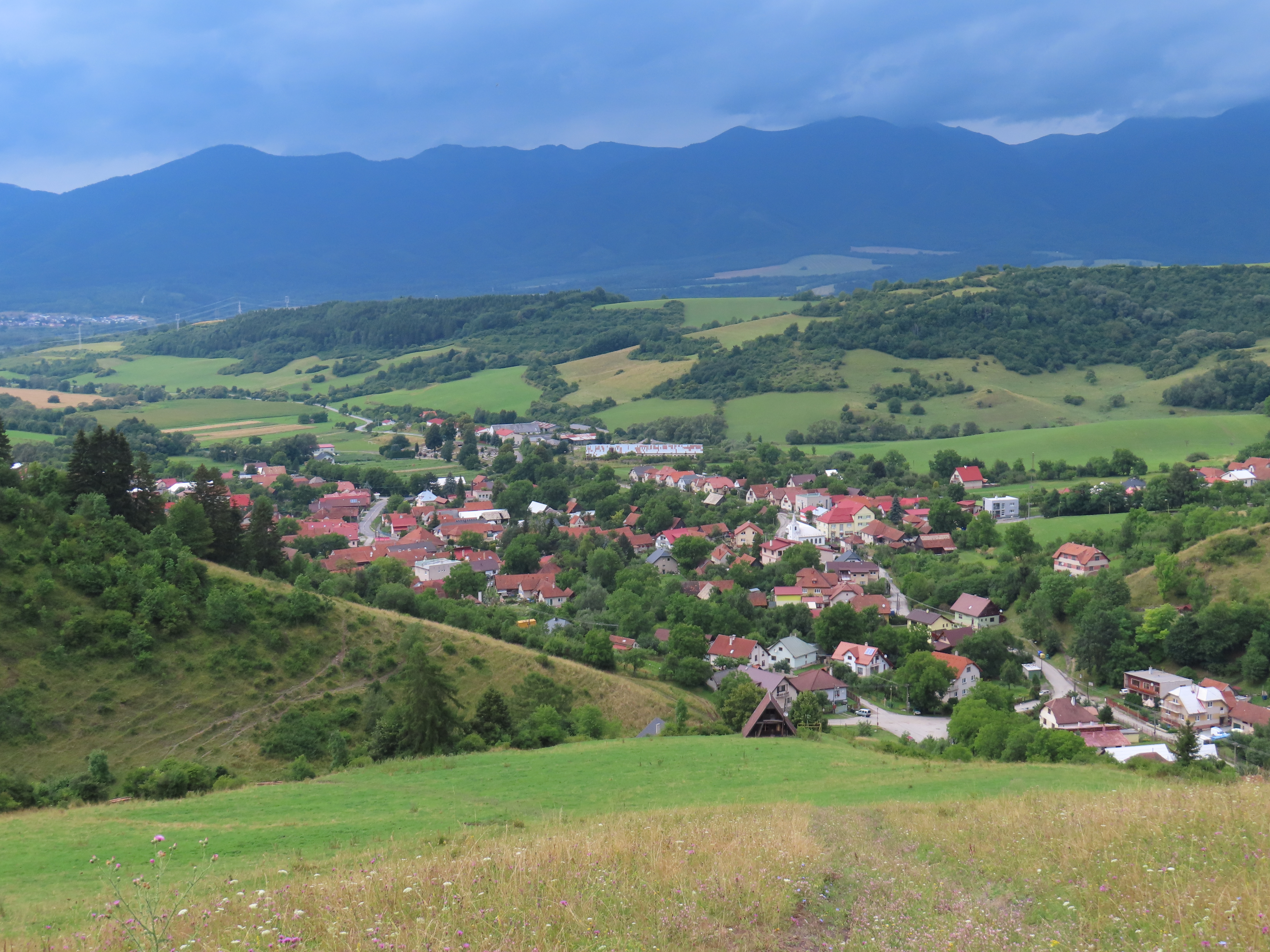

- Flag

- Location of Podhradie in the Žilina Region Location of Podhradie in Slovakia
- Coordinates: 49°05′00″N 19°03′20″E
- Country: Slovakia
- Region: Žilina Region
- District: Martin District
- First mentioned: 1699

Area
  - Total: 16.39 km^{2} (6.33 sq mi)
- Elevation: 464 m (1,522 ft)

Population (2025)
  - Total: 672
- Time zone: UTC+1 (CET)
  - Summer (DST): UTC+2 (CEST)
- Postal code: 385 2
- Area code: +421 43
- Vehicle registration plate (until 2022): MT
- Website: podhradie-martin.sk

Podhradie (Hungarian: Szucsányváralja) is a village and municipality in Martin District in the Žilina Region of northern Slovakia.

== History ==
In historical records the village was first mentioned in 1699. Before the establishment of independent Czechoslovakia in 1918, it was part of Turóc County within the Kingdom of Hungary. From 1939 to 1945, it was part of the Slovak Republic.

== Geography ==
The municipality lies at an altitude of 464 metres (1,522 ft) and covers an area of 16.39 km^{2} (6.33 sq mi) (2025).

== Population ==
Population statistic (10 years)
Year	1995	2005	2015	2025
Count	711	689	676	672
Difference		−3.09%	−1.88%	−0.59%

Population statistic
Year	2024	2025
Count	679	672
Difference		−1.03%

It has a population of 672 people (31 December 2025).

=== Ethnicity ===
Census 2021 (1+ %)
Ethnicity	Number	Fraction
Slovak	670	98.24%
Not found out	15	2.19%
Total	682	

In year 2021 was 682 people by ethnicity 670 as Slovak, 15 as Not found out, 3 as Russian, 3 as Other, 2 as Czech, 2 as Romanian, 1 as Rusyn, 1 as Hungarian and 1 as English.

Note on population: The difference values of population numbers in the table "Population statistic" and in the sections "Ethnicity" & "Religion" is caused by the use of various statistical methods.

=== Religion ===
Census 2021 (1+ %)
Religion	Number	Fraction
Evangelical Church	383	56.16%
None	148	21.7%
Roman Catholic Church	112	16.42%
Not found out	15	2.2%
Total	682	

In year 2021 was 682 people by religion 383 from Evangelical Church, 148 from None, 112 from Roman Catholic Church, 15 from Not found out, 6 from Other and not ascertained christian church, 5 from Ad hoc movements, 4 from Other, 2 from Christian Congregations in Slovakia, 2 from Greek Catholic Church, 2 from Seventh-day Adventist Church, 1 from Calvinist Church, 1 from Czechoslovak Hussite Church and 1 from Apostolic Church.
