= Dolný Kalník =

- Municipality
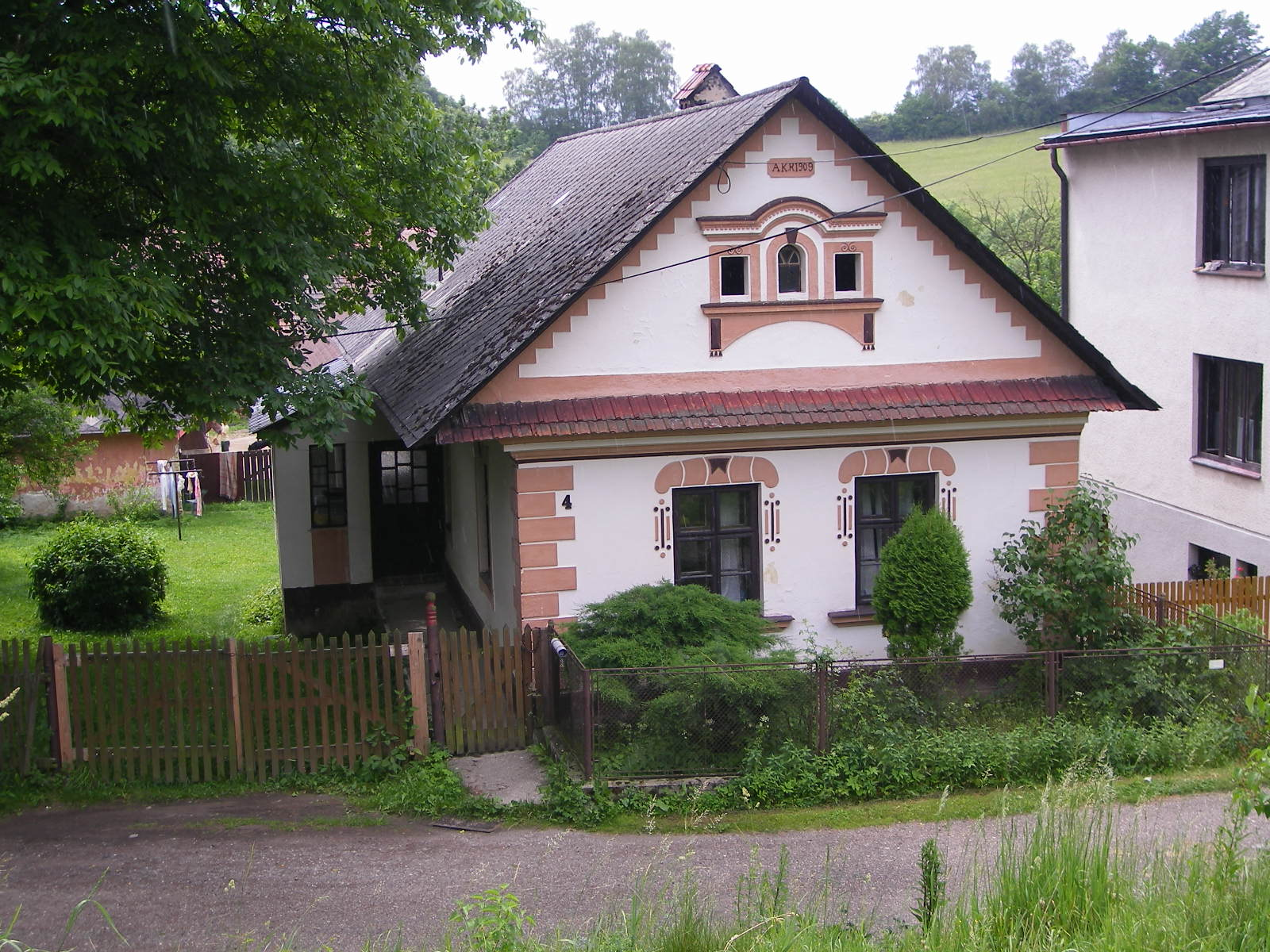

- Flag

- Location of Dolný Kalník in the Žilina Region Location of Dolný Kalník in Slovakia
- Coordinates: 49.03°N 18.95°E
- Country: Slovakia
- Region: Žilina Region
- District: Martin District
- First mentioned: 1355

Area
  - Total: 1.29 km^{2} (0.50 sq mi)
- Elevation: 433 m (1,421 ft)

Population (2025)
  - Total: 365
- Time zone: UTC+1 (CET)
  - Summer (DST): UTC+2 (CEST)
- Postal code: 380 2
- Area code: +421 43
- Vehicle registration plate (until 2022): MT
- Website: www.dolnykalnik.sk

Dolný Kalník (Hungarian: Alsókálnok) is a village and municipality in Martin District in the Žilina Region of northern Slovakia.

== History ==
In historical records the village was first mentioned in 1355. Before the establishment of independent Czechoslovakia in 1918, it was part of Turóc County within the Kingdom of Hungary. From 1939 to 1945, it was part of the Slovak Republic.

== Geography ==
The municipality lies at an altitude of 433 metres (1,421 ft) and covers an area of 1.29 km^{2} (0.50 sq mi) (2025).

== Population ==
Population statistic (10 years)
Year	1995	2005	2015	2025
Count	46	43	206	365
Difference		−6.52%	+379.06%	+77.18%

Population statistic
Year	2024	2025
Count	367	365
Difference		−0.54%

It has a population of 365 people (31 December 2025).

=== Ethnicity ===
Census 2021 (1+ %)
Ethnicity	Number	Fraction
Slovak	296	98.33%
Total	301	

In year 2021 was 301 people by ethnicity 296 as Slovak, 3 as Czech, 2 as Not found out, 1 as German and 1 as Other.

Note on population: The difference values of population numbers in the table "Population statistic" and in the sections "Ethnicity" & "Religion" is caused by the use of various statistical methods.

=== Religion ===
Census 2021 (1+ %)
Religion	Number	Fraction
None	133	44.19%
Roman Catholic Church	95	31.56%
Evangelical Church	62	20.6%
Other	4	1.33%
Total	301	

In year 2021 was 301 people by religion 133 from None, 95 from Roman Catholic Church, 62 from Evangelical Church, 4 from Other, 2 from Not found out, 2 from Greek Catholic Church, 1 from Paganism and natural spirituality, 1 from Islam and 1 from Buddhism.

== Genealogical resources ==
The records for genealogical research are available at the state archive "Statny Archiv in Bytca, Slovakia"

- Lutheran church records (births/marriages/deaths): 1783-1896 (parish B)

== See also ==
- List of municipalities and towns in Slovakia
