= Kaľamenová =

- Municipality
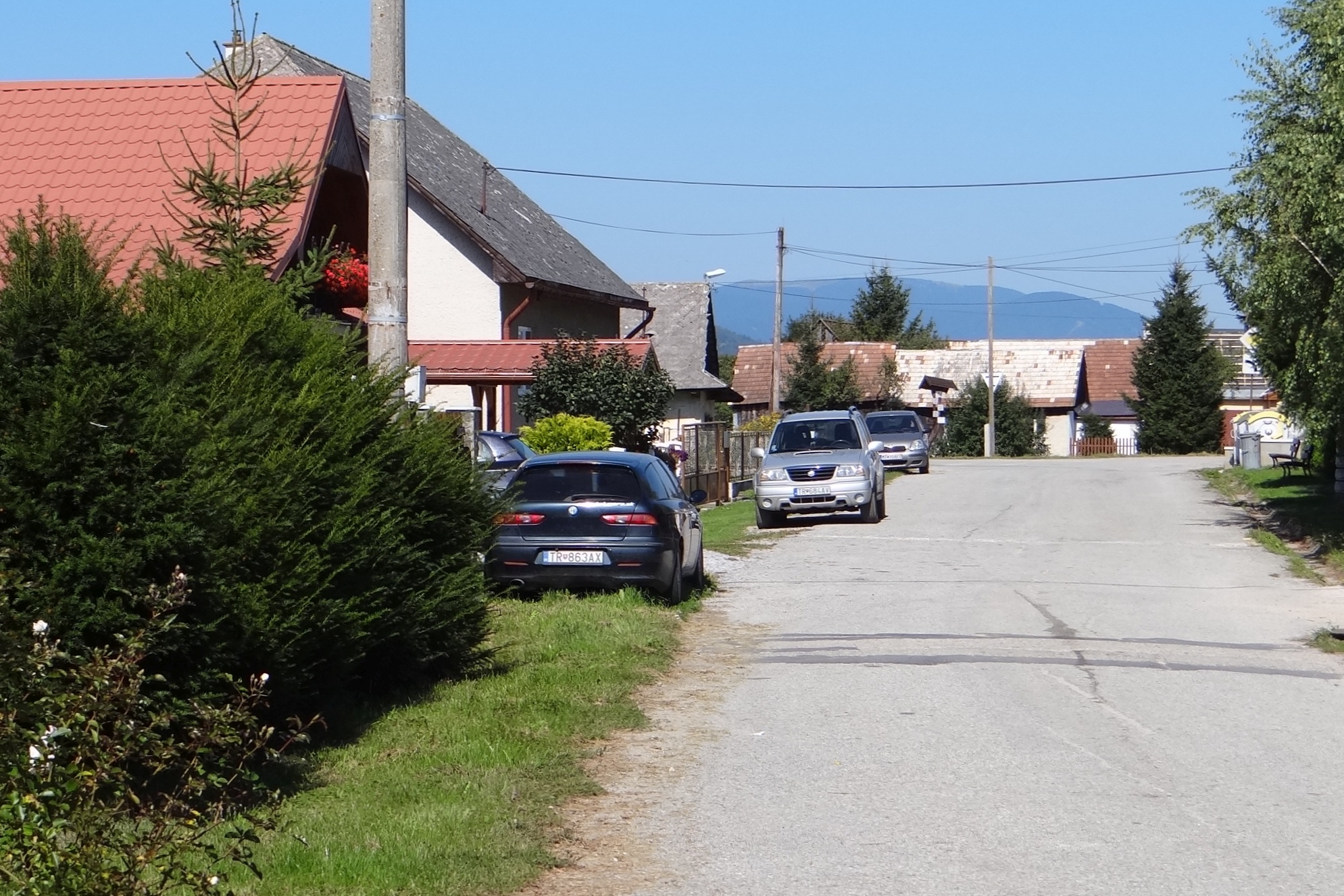

- Flag

- Location of Kaľamenová in the Žilina Region Location of Kaľamenová in Slovakia
- Coordinates: 48.88°N 18.78°E
- Country: Slovakia
- Region: Žilina Region
- District: Turčianske Teplice District
- First mentioned: 1240

Area
  - Total: 5.79 km^{2} (2.24 sq mi)
- Elevation: 463 m (1,519 ft)

Population (2025)
  - Total: 100
- Time zone: UTC+1 (CET)
  - Summer (DST): UTC+2 (CEST)
- Postal code: 382 2
- Area code: +421 43
- Vehicle registration plate (until 2022): RK
- Website: www.kalamenova.sk

Kaľamenová (Hungarian: Turóckelemenfalva, German: Kalmannsdorf) is a village and municipality in Turčianske Teplice District in the Žilina Region of northern central Slovakia.

== History ==
In historical records the village was first mentioned in 1240. Before the establishment of independent Czechoslovakia in 1918, it was part of Turóc County within the Kingdom of Hungary. From 1939 to 1945, it was part of the Slovak Republic.

== Geography ==
The municipality lies at an altitude of 463 metres (1,519 ft) and covers an area of 5.79 km^{2} (2.24 sq mi) (2025).

== Population ==
Population statistic (10 years)
Year	1995	2005	2015	2025
Count	56	66	85	100
Difference		+17.85%	+28.78%	+17.64%

Population statistic
Year	2024	2025
Count	96	100
Difference		+4.16%

It has a population of 100 people (31 December 2025).

=== Ethnicity ===
Census 2021 (1+ %)
Ethnicity	Number	Fraction
Slovak	84	98.82%
Hungarian	2	2.35%
Not found out	1	1.17%
Total	85	

In year 2021 was 85 people by ethnicity 84 as Slovak, 2 as Hungarian and 1 as Not found out.

Note on population: The difference values of population numbers in the table "Population statistic" and in the sections "Ethnicity" & "Religion" is caused by the use of various statistical methods.

=== Religion ===
Census 2021 (1+ %)
Religion	Number	Fraction
Roman Catholic Church	29	34.12%
Evangelical Church	29	34.12%
None	17	20%
Other	6	7.06%
Not found out	3	3.53%
Paganism and natural spirituality	1	1.18%
Total	85	

In year 2021 was 85 people by religion 29 from Roman Catholic Church, 29 from Evangelical Church, 17 from None, 6 from Other, 3 from Not found out and 1 from Paganism and natural spirituality.

== Genealogical resources ==
The records for genealogical research are available at the state archive "Statny Archiv in Bytca, Slovakia"

- Roman Catholic church records (births/marriages/deaths): 1730-1897 (parish B)
- Lutheran church records (births/marriages/deaths): 1784-1896 (parish B)

== See also ==
- List of municipalities and towns in Slovakia
