= Jazernica =

- Municipality
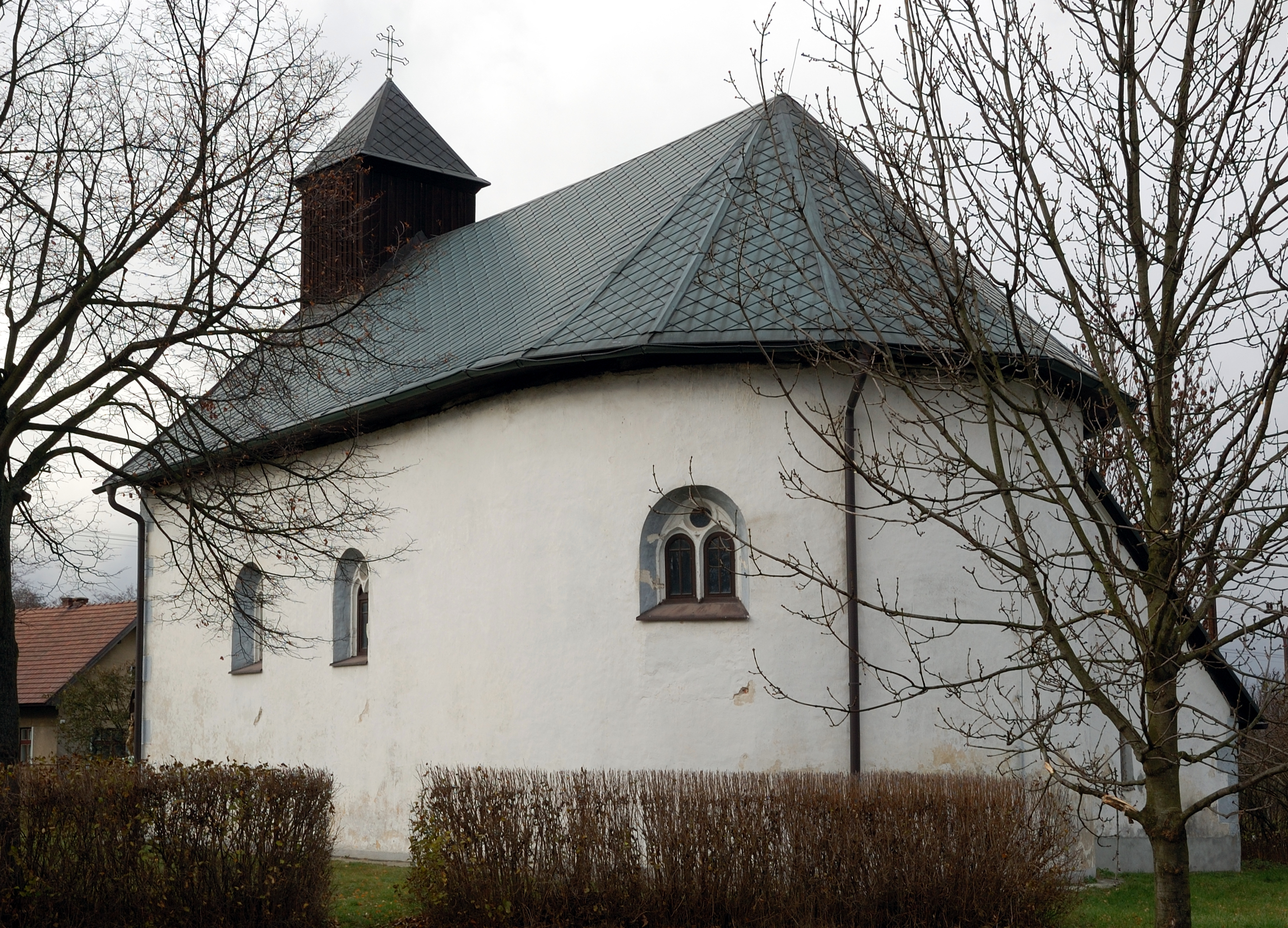

- Flag

- Location of Jazernica in the Žilina Region Location of Jazernica in Slovakia
- Coordinates: 48.93°N 18.83°E
- Country: Slovakia
- Region: Žilina Region
- District: Turčianske Teplice District
- First mentioned: 1361

Area
  - Total: 2.92 km^{2} (1.13 sq mi)
- Elevation: 449 m (1,473 ft)

Population (2025)
  - Total: 371
- Time zone: UTC+1 (CET)
  - Summer (DST): UTC+2 (CEST)
- Postal code: 384 4
- Area code: +421 43
- Vehicle registration plate (until 2022): RK
- Website: www.jazernica.eu

Jazernica (Hungarian: Márkfalva) is a village and municipality in Turčianske Teplice District in the Žilina Region of northern central Slovakia.

== History ==
The village was first mentioned in historical records from 1361. Before the establishment of independent Czechoslovakia in 1918, it was part of Turóc County within the Kingdom of Hungary. From 1939 to 1945, it was part of the Slovak Republic.

== Geography ==
The municipality lies at an altitude of 449 metres (1,473 ft) and covers an area of 2.92 km^{2} (1.13 sq mi) (2025).

== Population ==
Population statistic (10 years)
Year	1995	2005	2015	2025
Count	243	301	321	371
Difference		+23.86%	+6.64%	+15.57%

Population statistic
Year	2024	2025
Count	355	371
Difference		+4.50%

It has a population of 371 people (31 December 2025).

=== Ethnicity ===
Census 2021 (1+ %)
Ethnicity	Number	Fraction
Slovak	329	93.46%
Not found out	21	5.96%
Total	352	

In year 2021 was 352 people by ethnicity 329 as Slovak, 21 as Not found out, 3 as Czech, 2 as Russian and 1 as Italian.

Note on population: The difference values of population numbers in the table "Population statistic" and in the sections "Ethnicity" & "Religion" is caused by the use of various statistical methods.

=== Religion ===
Census 2021 (1+ %)
Religion	Number	Fraction
Roman Catholic Church	152	43.18%
None	119	33.81%
Evangelical Church	45	12.78%
Not found out	24	6.82%
Total	352	

In year 2021 was 352 people by religion 152 from Roman Catholic Church, 119 from None, 45 from Evangelical Church, 24 from Not found out, 3 from Greek Catholic Church, 3 from Ad hoc movements, 2 from Other, 2 from United Methodist Church, 1 from Calvinist Church and 1 from Buddhism.

== Genealogical resources ==
The records for genealogical research are available at the state archive "Statny Archiv in Bytca, Slovakia"

- Roman Catholic church records (births/marriages/deaths): 1690-1950 (parish B)
- Lutheran church records (births/marriages/deaths): 1715-1895 (parish B)

== See also ==
- List of municipalities and towns in Slovakia
