= Čremošné =

- Municipality
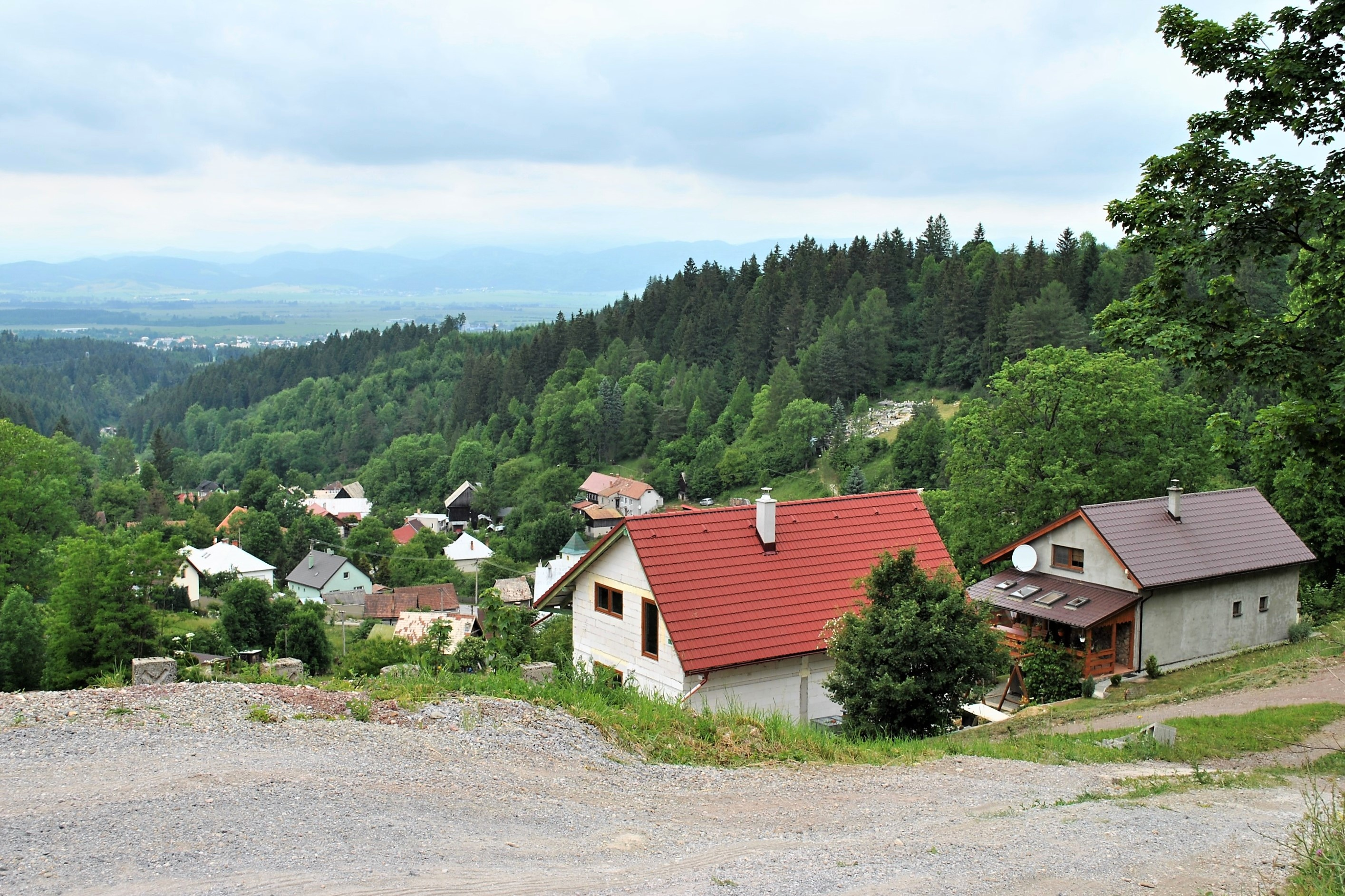

- Flag

- Location of Čremošné in the Žilina Region Location of Čremošné in Slovakia
- Coordinates: 48.85°N 18.90°E
- Country: Slovakia
- Region: Žilina Region
- District: Turčianske Teplice District
- First mentioned: 1340

Area
  - Total: 16.17 km^{2} (6.24 sq mi)
- Elevation: 649 m (2,129 ft)

Population (2025)
  - Total: 85
- Time zone: UTC+1 (CET)
  - Summer (DST): UTC+2 (CEST)
- Postal code: 390 1
- Area code: +421 43
- Vehicle registration plate (until 2022): RK
- Website: www.cremosne.sk

Čremošné (Hungarian: Turócmeggyes) is a village and municipality in Turčianske Teplice District in the Žilina Region of northern central Slovakia.

== History ==
In historical records the village was first mentioned in 1340. Before the establishment of independent Czechoslovakia in 1918, it was part of Turóc County within the Kingdom of Hungary. From 1939 to 1945, it was part of the Slovak Republic.

== Geography ==
The municipality lies at an altitude of 649 metres (2,129 ft) and covers an area of 16.17 km^{2} (6.24 sq mi) (2025).

== Population ==
Population statistic (10 years)
Year	1995	2005	2015	2025
Count	100	92	80	85
Difference		−8%	−13.04%	+6.25%

Population statistic
Year	2024	2025
Count	83	85
Difference		+2.40%

It has a population of 85 people (31 December 2025).

=== Ethnicity ===
Census 2021 (1+ %)
Ethnicity	Number	Fraction
Slovak	77	97.46%
Czech	1	1.26%
Not found out	1	1.26%
Moravian	1	1.26%
Hungarian	1	1.26%
Other	1	1.26%
Total	79	

In year 2021 was 79 people by ethnicity 77 as Slovak, 1 as Czech, 1 as Not found out, 1 as Moravian, 1 as Hungarian and 1 as Other.

Note on population: The difference values of population numbers in the table "Population statistic" and in the sections "Ethnicity" & "Religion" is caused by the use of various statistical methods.

=== Religion ===
Census 2021 (1+ %)
Religion	Number	Fraction
Evangelical Church	48	60.76%
Roman Catholic Church	24	30.38%
None	5	6.33%
Calvinist Church	1	1.27%
Not found out	1	1.27%
Total	79	

In year 2021 was 79 people by religion 48 from Evangelical Church, 24 from Roman Catholic Church, 5 from None, 1 from Calvinist Church and 1 from Not found out.

== Genealogical resources ==
The records for genealogical research are available at the state archive "Statny Archiv in Bytca, Slovakia"

- Roman Catholic church records (births/marriages/deaths): 1674-1896 (parish B)
- Lutheran church records (births/marriages/deaths): 1820-1923 (parish B)

== See also ==
- List of municipalities and towns in Slovakia
