= Bodorová =

- Municipality
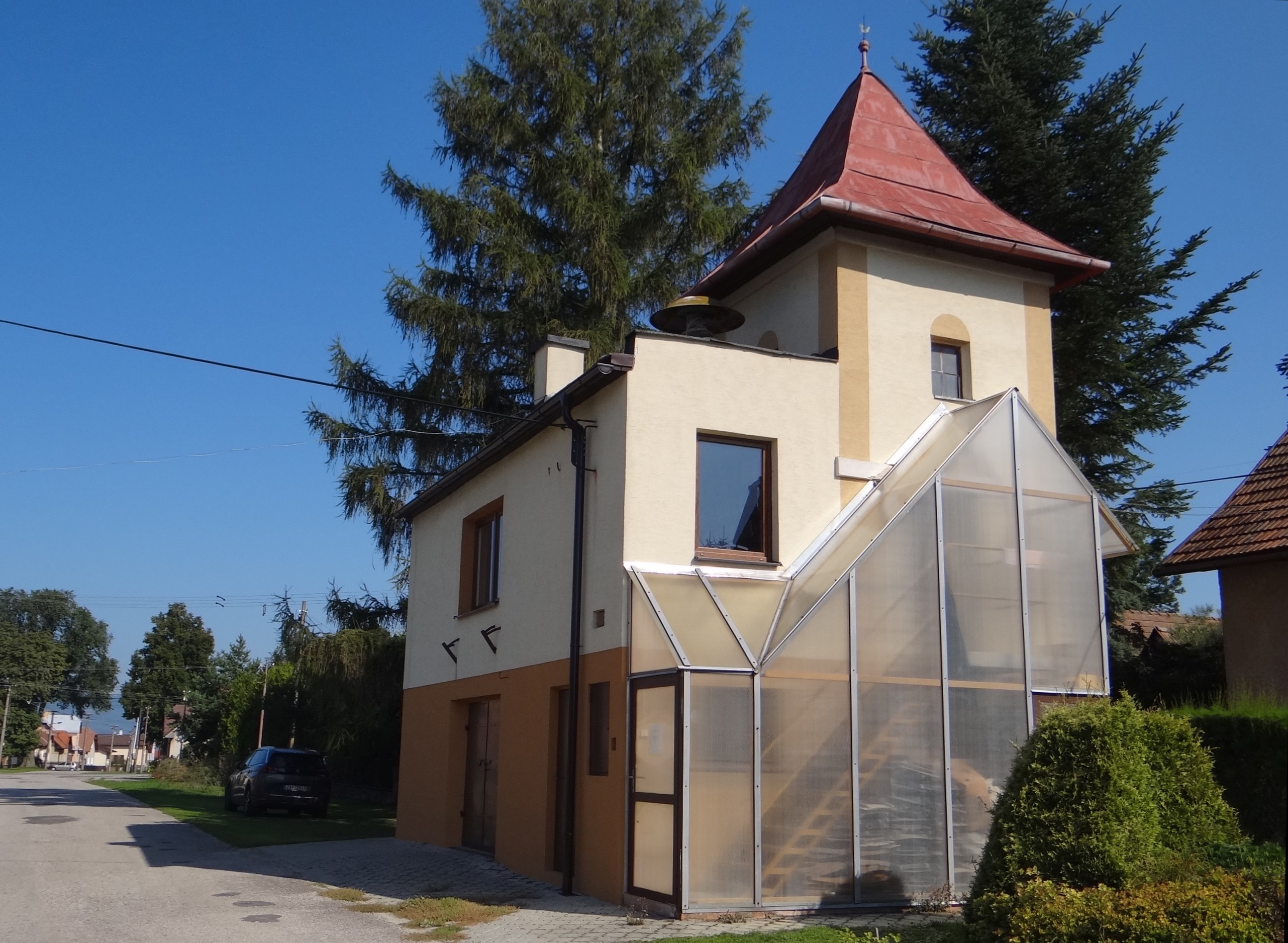

- Flag

- Location of Bodorová in the Žilina Region Location of Bodorová in Slovakia
- Coordinates: 48.90°N 18.83°E
- Country: Slovakia
- Region: Žilina Region
- District: Turčianske Teplice District
- First mentioned: 1265

Government
  - Mayor: Jana Pagáčová

Area
  - Total: 5.11 km^{2} (1.97 sq mi)
- Elevation: 464 m (1,522 ft)

Population (2025)
  - Total: 235
- Time zone: UTC+1 (CET)
  - Summer (DST): UTC+2 (CEST)
- Postal code: 384 5
- Area code: +421 43
- Vehicle registration plate (until 2022): RK
- Website: www.bodorova.sk

Bodorová (Hungarian: Bodorfalva) is a village and municipality in Turčianske Teplice District in the Žilina Region of northern central Slovakia.

== History ==
In historical records the village was first mentioned in 1265. Before the establishment of independent Czechoslovakia in 1918, it was part of Turóc County within the Kingdom of Hungary. From 1939 to 1945, it was part of the Slovak Republic.

== Geography ==
The municipality lies at an altitude of 464 metres (1,522 ft) and covers an area of 5.11 km^{2} (1.97 sq mi) (2025).

== Population ==
Population statistic (10 years)
Year	1995	2005	2015	2025
Count	215	261	245	235
Difference		+21.39%	−6.13%	−4.08%

Population statistic
Year	2024	2025
Count	240	235
Difference		−2.08%

It has a population of 235 people (31 December 2025).

=== Ethnicity ===
Census 2021 (1+ %)
Ethnicity	Number	Fraction
Slovak	234	97.5%
Czech	6	2.5%
Hungarian	4	1.66%
Total	240	

In year 2021 was 240 people by ethnicity 234 as Slovak, 6 as Czech, 4 as Hungarian, 2 as Not found out, 2 as Other and 1 as German.

Note on population: The difference values of population numbers in the table "Population statistic" and in the sections "Ethnicity" & "Religion" is caused by the use of various statistical methods.

=== Religion ===
Census 2021 (1+ %)
Religion	Number	Fraction
Roman Catholic Church	86	35.83%
None	80	33.33%
Evangelical Church	69	28.75%
Not found out	4	1.67%
Total	240	

In year 2021 was 240 people by religion 86 from Roman Catholic Church, 80 from None, 69 from Evangelical Church, 4 from Not found out and 1 from Paganism and natural spirituality.

== Genealogical resources ==
The records for genealogical research are available at the state archive "Statny Archiv in Bytca, Slovakia"

- Roman Catholic church records (births/marriages/deaths): 1690-1896 (parish B)
- Lutheran church records (births/marriages/deaths): 1715-1895 (parish B)

== See also ==
- List of municipalities and towns in Slovakia
