= Budiš =

- Municipality
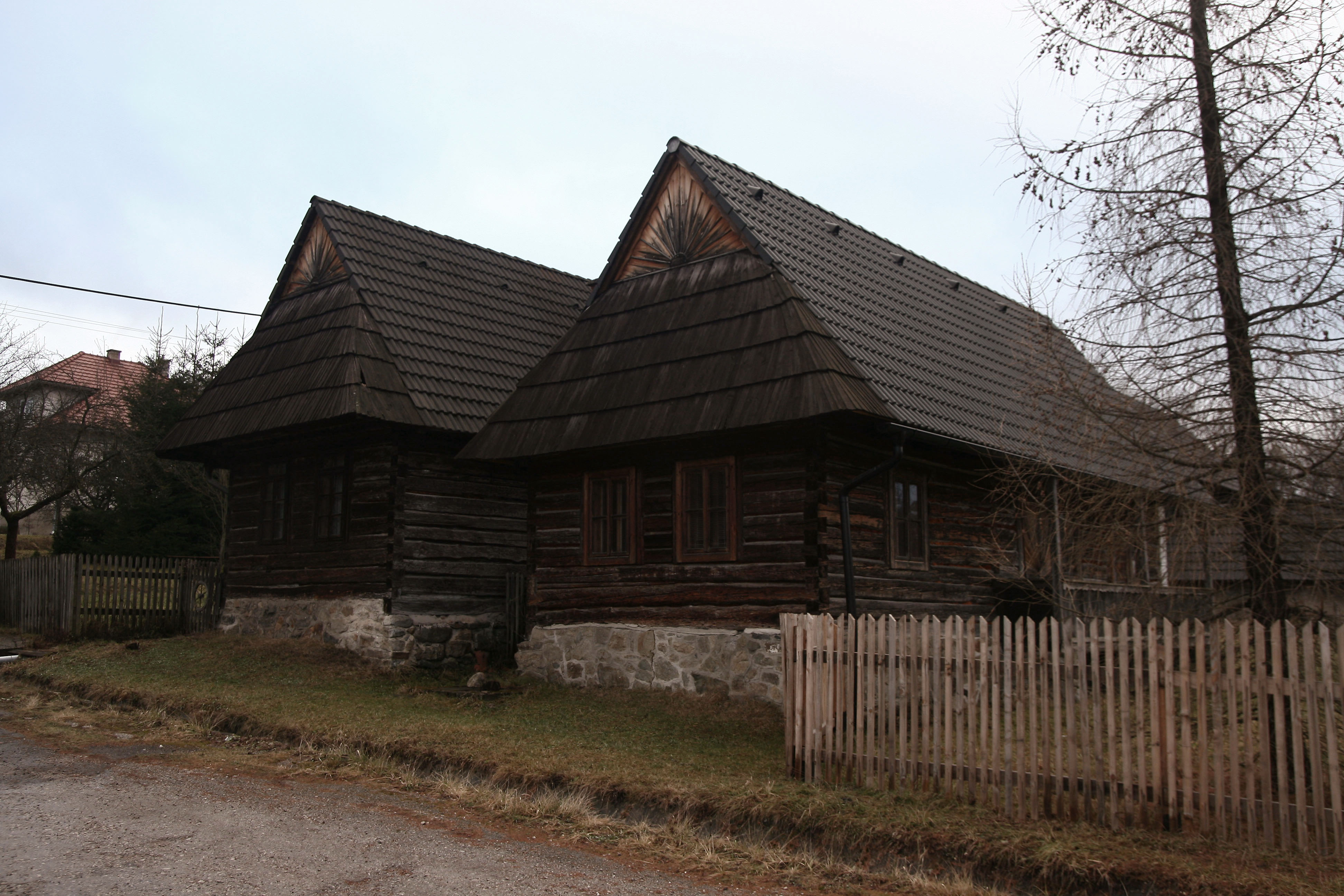

- Flag Coat of arms

- Location of Budiš in the Žilina Region Location of Budiš in Slovakia
- Coordinates: 48.87°N 18.77°E
- Country: Slovakia
- Region: Žilina Region
- District: Turčianske Teplice District
- First mentioned: 1573

Government
  - Mayor: Svetozár Ďurica

Area
  - Total: 10.27 km^{2} (3.97 sq mi)
- Elevation: 478 m (1,568 ft)

Population (2025)
  - Total: 193
- Time zone: UTC+1 (CET)
  - Summer (DST): UTC+2 (CEST)
- Postal code: 382 3
- Area code: +421 43
- Vehicle registration plate (until 2022): RK
- Website: www.obecbudis.sk

Budiš (Hungarian: Turócborkút) is a village and municipality in Turčianske Teplice District in the Žilina Region of northern central Slovakia.

== History ==
In historical records, the village was first mentioned in 1573. Before the establishment of independent Czechoslovakia in 1918, it was part of Turóc County within the Kingdom of Hungary. From 1939 to 1945, it was part of the Slovak Republic.

== Geography ==
The municipality lies at an altitude of 478 metres (1,568 ft) and covers an area of 10.27 km^{2} (3.97 sq mi) (2025).

== Population ==
Population statistic (10 years)
Year	1995	2005	2015	2025
Count	194	212	200	193
Difference		+9.27%	−5.66%	−3.5%

Population statistic
Year	2024	2025
Count	197	193
Difference		−2.03%

It has a population of 193 people (31 December 2025).

=== Ethnicity ===
Census 2021 (1+ %)
Ethnicity	Number	Fraction
Slovak	192	97.95%
Czech	2	1.02%
Not found out	2	1.02%
Total	196	

In year 2021 was 196 people by ethnicity 192 as Slovak, 2 as Czech, 2 as Not found out, 1 as Rusyn, 1 as German and 1 as Other.

Note on population: The difference values of population numbers in the table "Population statistic" and in the sections "Ethnicity" & "Religion" is caused by the use of various statistical methods.

=== Religion ===
Census 2021 (1+ %)
Religion	Number	Fraction
Evangelical Church	89	45.41%
None	61	31.12%
Roman Catholic Church	34	17.35%
Not found out	4	2.04%
United Methodist Church	3	1.53%
Total	196	

In year 2021 was 196 people by religion 89 from Evangelical Church, 61 from None, 34 from Roman Catholic Church, 4 from Not found out, 3 from United Methodist Church, 1 from Paganism and natural spirituality, 1 from Other, 1 from Greek Catholic Church, 1 from Baptists Church and 1 from Apostolic Church.

== Genealogical resources ==
The records for genealogical research are available at the state archive "Statny Archiv in Bytca, Slovakia."

- Lutheran church records (births/marriages/deaths): 1784–1896 (parish B)

== See also ==
- List of municipalities and towns in Slovakia
