= Moškovec =

- Municipality
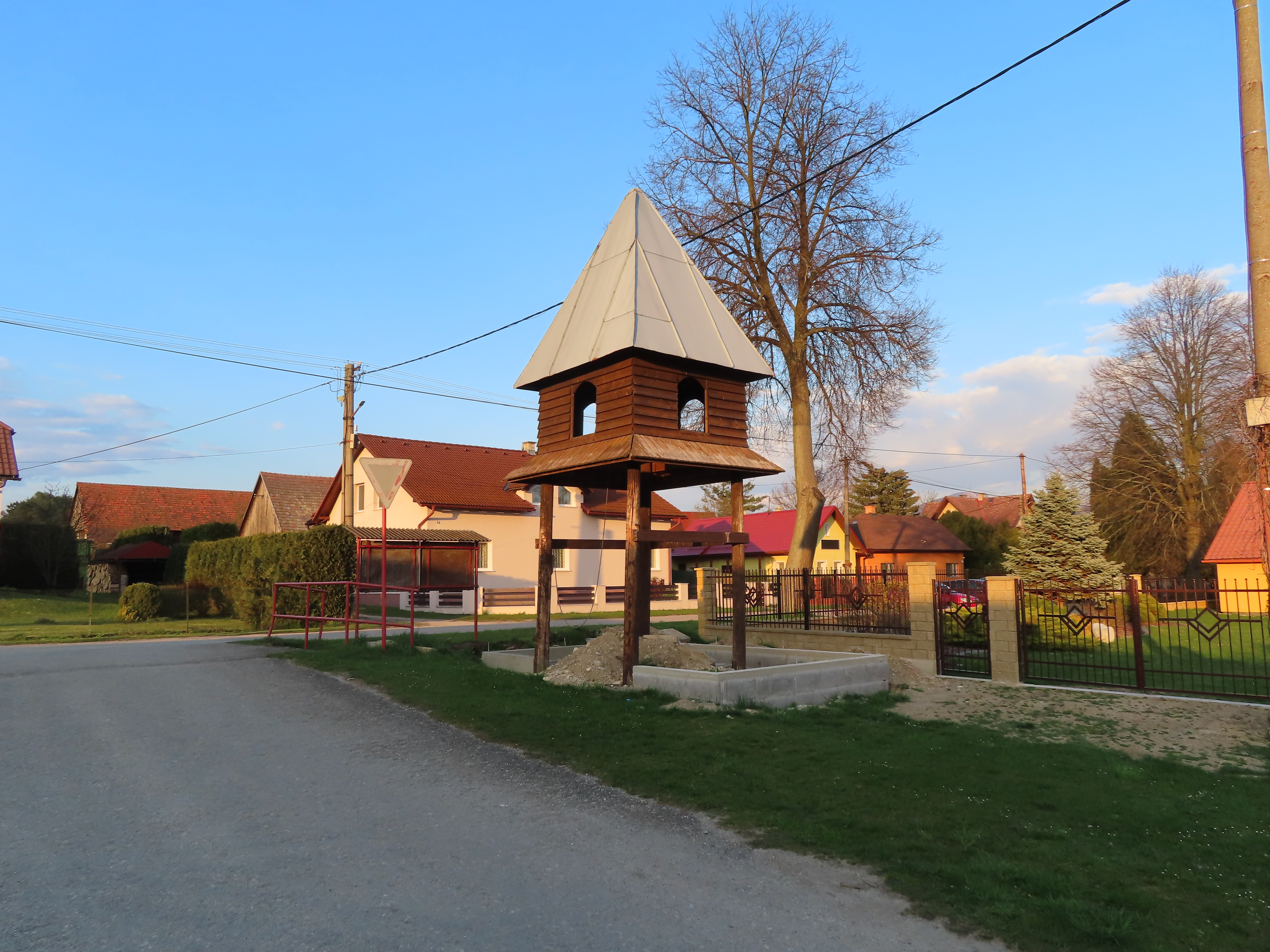

- Flag

- Location of Moškovec in the Žilina Region Location of Moškovec in Slovakia
- Coordinates: 48.95°N 18.83°E
- Country: Slovakia
- Region: Žilina Region
- District: Turčianske Teplice District
- First mentioned: 1258

Area
  - Total: 2.10 km^{2} (0.81 sq mi)
- Elevation: 448 m (1,470 ft)

Population (2025)
  - Total: 84
- Time zone: UTC+1 (CET)
  - Summer (DST): UTC+2 (CEST)
- Postal code: 384 4
- Area code: +421 43
- Vehicle registration plate (until 2022): RK
- Website: www.moskovec.sk

Moškovec (Hungarian: Moskóc, German: Moschendorf) is a village and municipality in Turčianske Teplice District in the Žilina Region of northern central Slovakia.

== History ==
In historical records the village was first mentioned in 1258. Before the establishment of independent Czechoslovakia in 1918, it was part of Turóc County within the Kingdom of Hungary. From 1939 to 1945, it was part of the Slovak Republic.

== Geography ==
The municipality lies at an altitude of 448 metres (1,470 ft) and covers an area of 2.10 km^{2} (0.81 sq mi) (2025).

== Population ==
Population statistic (10 years)
Year	1995	2005	2015	2025
Count	53	62	65	84
Difference		+16.98%	+4.83%	+29.23%

Population statistic
Year	2024	2025
Count	83	84
Difference		+1.20%

It has a population of 84 people (31 December 2025).

=== Ethnicity ===
Census 2021 (1+ %)
Ethnicity	Number	Fraction
Slovak	69	98.57%
German	1	1.42%
English	1	1.42%
Total	70	

In year 2021 was 70 people by ethnicity 69 as Slovak, 1 as German and 1 as English.

Note on population: The difference values of population numbers in the table "Population statistic" and in the sections "Ethnicity" & "Religion" is caused by the use of various statistical methods.

=== Religion ===
Census 2021 (1+ %)
Religion	Number	Fraction
None	30	42.86%
Roman Catholic Church	25	35.71%
Evangelical Church	15	21.43%
Total	70	

In year 2021 was 70 people by religion 30 from None, 25 from Roman Catholic Church and 15 from Evangelical Church.
