= Jasenovo, Slovakia =

Jasenovo
- Municipality
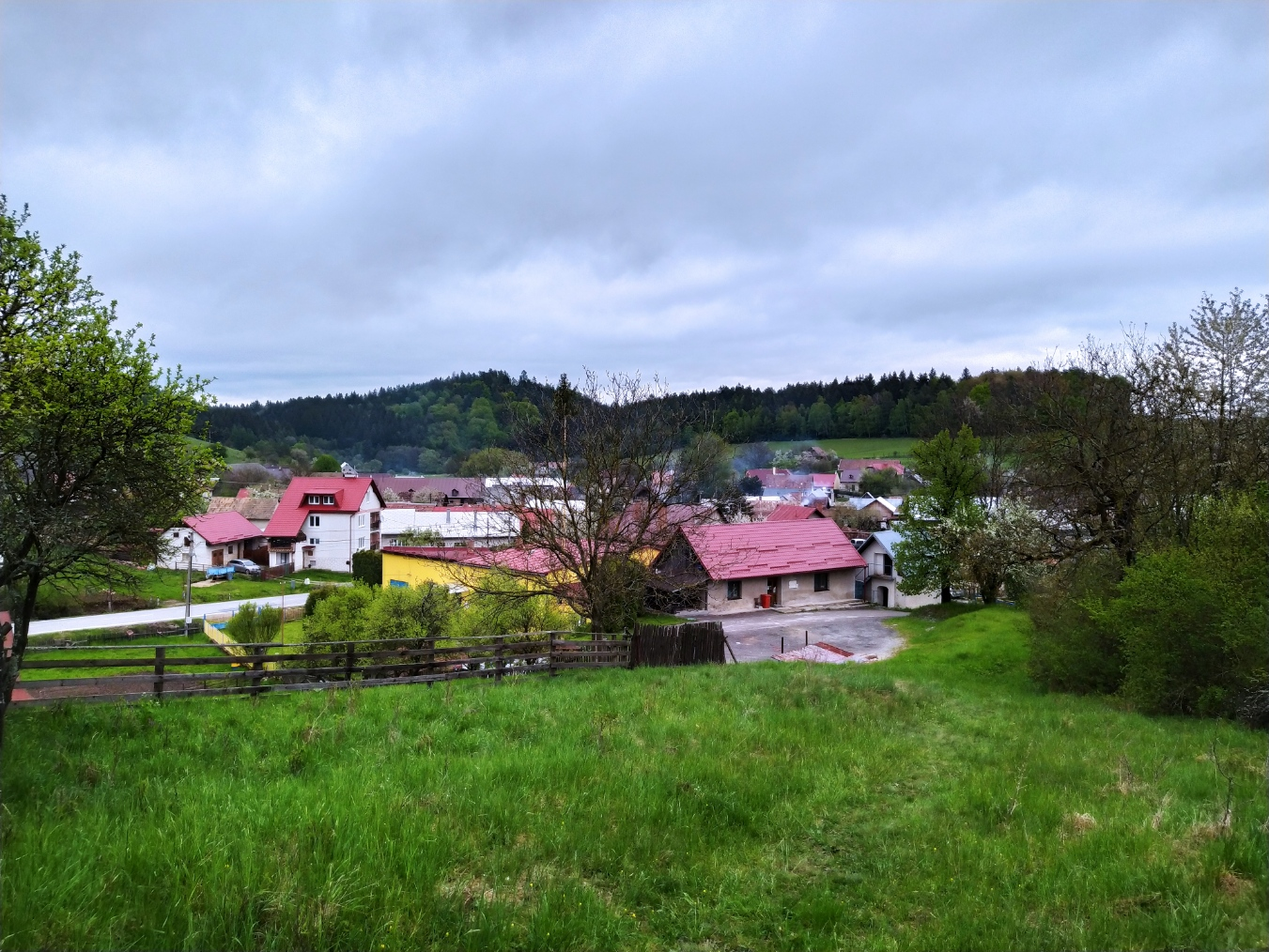

- Flag

- Location of Jasenovo in the Žilina Region Location of Jasenovo in Slovakia
- Coordinates: 48°53′N 18°43′E
- Country: Slovakia
- Region: Žilina Region
- District: Turčianske Teplice District
- First mentioned: 1495

Area
  - Total: 8.33 km^{2} (3.22 sq mi)
- Elevation: 503 m (1,650 ft)

Population (2025)
  - Total: 123
- Time zone: UTC+1 (CET)
  - Summer (DST): UTC+2 (CEST)
- Postal code: 382 2
- Area code: +421 45
- Vehicle registration plate (until 2022): RK
- Website: www.jasenovo.sk

Jasenovo (Hungarian: Turócjeszenő, until 1899 Jaszenova) is a village and municipality in Turčianske Teplice District in the Žilina Region of northern central Slovakia.

== History ==
In historical records the village was first mentioned in 1495. Before the establishment of independent Czechoslovakia in 1918, it was part of Turóc County within the Kingdom of Hungary. From 1939 to 1945, it was part of the Slovak Republic.

== Geography ==
The municipality lies at an altitude of 503 metres (1,650 ft) and covers an area of 8.33 km^{2} (3.22 sq mi) (2025).

== Population ==
Population statistic (10 years)
Year	1995	2005	2015	2025
Count	183	164	141	123
Difference		−10.38%	−14.02%	−12.76%

Population statistic
Year	2024	2025
Count	125	123
Difference		−1.6%

It has a population of 123 people (31 December 2025).

=== Ethnicity ===
Census 2021 (1+ %)
Ethnicity	Number	Fraction
Slovak	119	96.74%
Czech	3	2.43%
Polish	3	2.43%
Not found out	2	1.62%
Total	123	

In year 2021 was 123 people by ethnicity 119 as Slovak, 3 as Czech, 3 as Polish, 2 as Not found out, 1 as Rusyn and 1 as English.

Note on population: The difference values of population numbers in the table "Population statistic" and in the sections "Ethnicity" & "Religion" is caused by the use of various statistical methods.

=== Religion ===
Census 2021 (1+ %)
Religion	Number	Fraction
Roman Catholic Church	60	48.78%
Evangelical Church	40	32.52%
None	18	14.63%
Not found out	2	1.63%
Christian Congregations in Slovakia	2	1.63%
Total	123	

In year 2021 was 123 people by religion 60 from Roman Catholic Church, 40 from Evangelical Church, 18 from None, 2 from Not found out, 2 from Christian Congregations in Slovakia and 1 from Islam.

== Genealogical resources ==
The records for genealogical research are available at the state archive "Statny Archiv in Bytca, Slovakia"

- Lutheran church records (births/marriages/deaths): 1647-1895 (parish B)

== See also ==
- List of municipalities and towns in Slovakia
