= Rudno, Slovakia =

Rudno
- Municipality
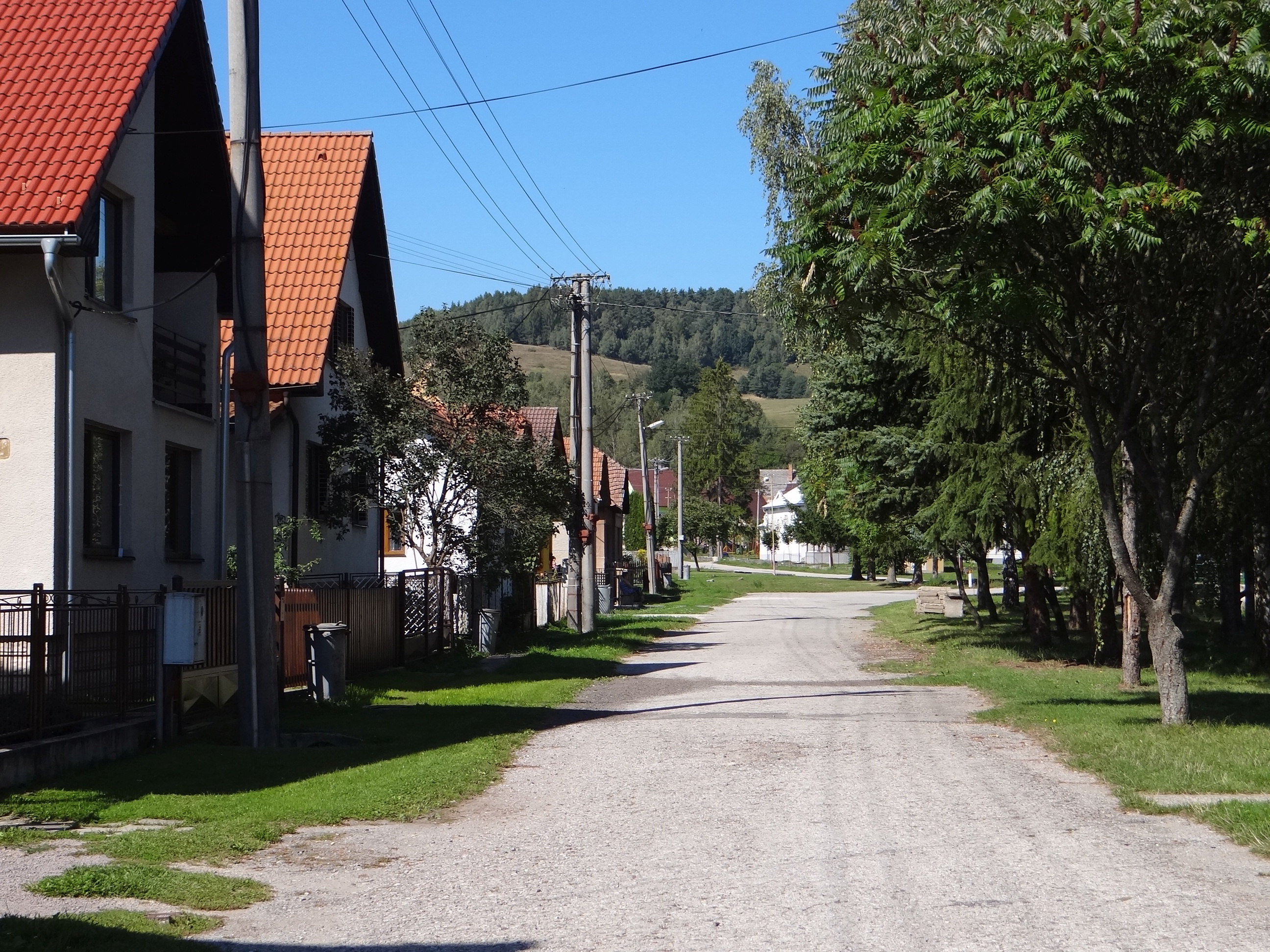

- Flag

- Location of Rudno in the Žilina Region Location of Rudno in Slovakia
- Coordinates: 48°53′N 18°45′E
- Country: Slovakia
- Region: Žilina Region
- District: Turčianske Teplice District
- First mentioned: 1343

Area
  - Total: 7.27 km^{2} (2.81 sq mi)
- Elevation: 489 m (1,604 ft)

Population (2025)
  - Total: 218
- Time zone: UTC+1 (CET)
  - Summer (DST): UTC+2 (CEST)
- Postal code: 385 2
- Area code: +421 43
- Vehicle registration plate (until 2022): RK
- Website: www.obecrudno.sk

Rudno (Hungarian: Turócrudnó, German: Rauden) is a village and municipality in Turčianske Teplice District in the Žilina Region of northern central Slovakia.

== History ==
In historical records, the village was first mentioned in 1343. Before the establishment of independent Czechoslovakia in 1918, it was part of Turóc County within the Kingdom of Hungary. From 1939 to 1945, it was part of the Slovak Republic.

== Geography ==
The municipality lies at an altitude of 489 metres (1,604 ft) and covers an area of 7.27 km^{2} (2.81 sq mi) (2025).

== Population ==
Population statistic (10 years)
Year	1995	2005	2015	2025
Count	225	225	210	218
Difference		+0%	−6.66%	+3.80%

Population statistic
Year	2024	2025
Count	210	218
Difference		+3.80%

It has a population of 218 people (31 December 2025).

=== Ethnicity ===
Census 2021 (1+ %)
Ethnicity	Number	Fraction
Slovak	196	98%
Czech	3	1.5%
Total	200	

In year 2021 was 200 people by ethnicity 196 as Slovak, 3 as Czech, 1 as Not found out, 1 as German and 1 as Bulgarian.

Note on population: The difference values of population numbers in the table "Population statistic" and in the sections "Ethnicity" & "Religion" is caused by the use of various statistical methods.

=== Religion ===
Census 2021 (1+ %)
Religion	Number	Fraction
Evangelical Church	81	40.5%
None	64	32%
Roman Catholic Church	46	23%
Greek Catholic Church	3	1.5%
Not found out	2	1%
Ad hoc movements	2	1%
Total	200	

In year 2021 was 200 people by religion 81 from Evangelical Church, 64 from None, 46 from Roman Catholic Church, 3 from Greek Catholic Church, 2 from Not found out, 2 from Ad hoc movements, 1 from Eastern Orthodox Church and 1 from United Methodist Church.
