= Ondrašová =

- Municipality
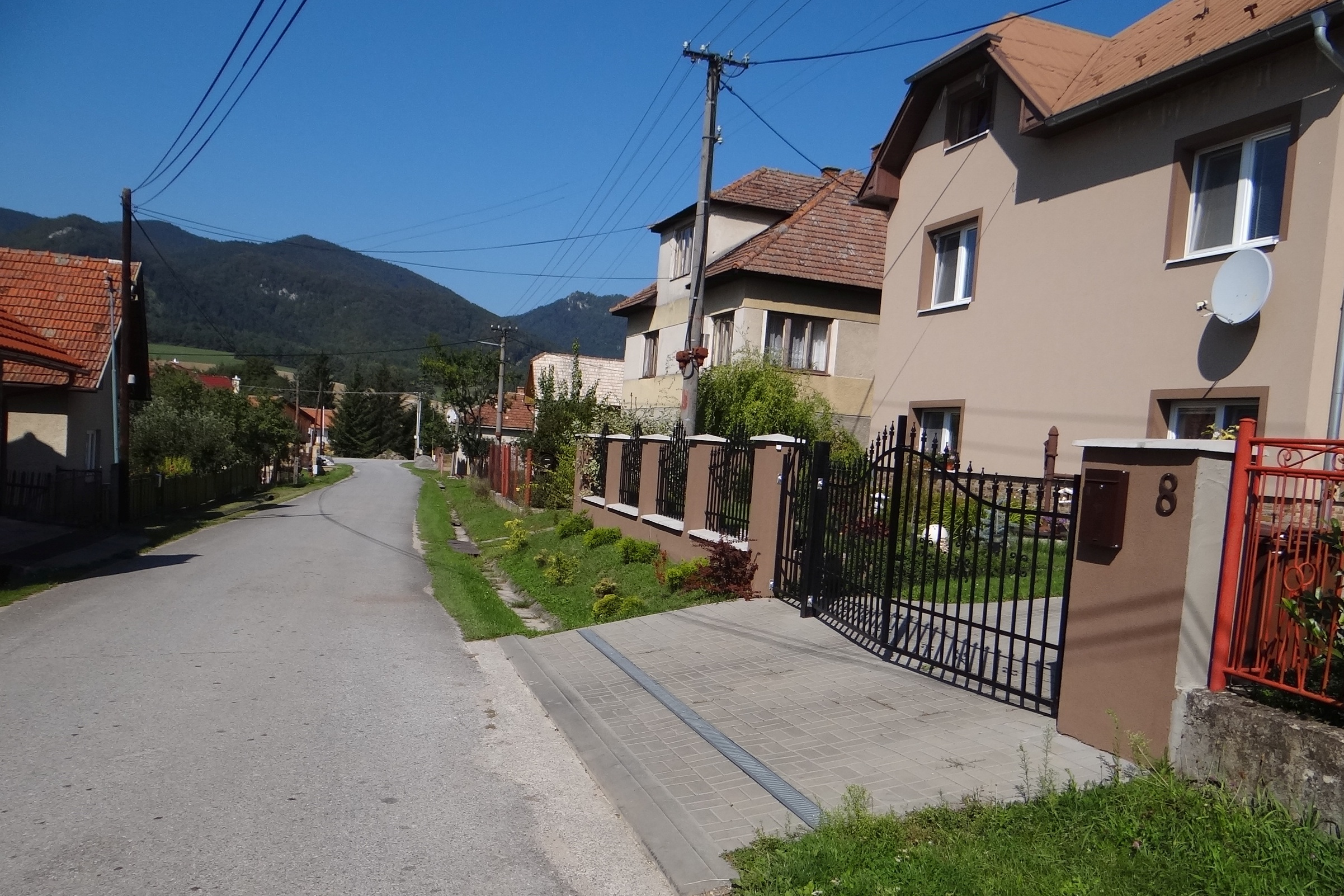

- Flag

- Location of Ondrašová in the Žilina Region Location of Ondrašová in Slovakia
- Coordinates: 48.94°N 18.81°E
- Country: Slovakia
- Region: Žilina Region
- District: Turčianske Teplice District
- First mentioned: 1252

Area
  - Total: 6.98 km^{2} (2.69 sq mi)
- Elevation: 464 m (1,522 ft)

Population (2025)
  - Total: 89
- Time zone: UTC+1 (CET)
  - Summer (DST): UTC+2 (CEST)
- Postal code: 382 2
- Area code: +421 43
- Vehicle registration plate (until 2022): RK
- Website: www.obecondrasova.sk

Ondrašová (German: Andreasdorf; Hungarian: Turócandrásfalva) is a village and municipality in Turčianske Teplice District in the Žilina Region of northern central Slovakia.

== History ==
In historical records the village was first mentioned in 1252. Before the establishment of independent Czechoslovakia in 1918, it was part of Turóc County within the Kingdom of Hungary. From 1939 to 1945, it was part of the Slovak Republic.

== Geography ==
The municipality lies at an altitude of 464 metres (1,522 ft) and covers an area of 6.98 km^{2} (2.69 sq mi) (2025).

== Population ==
Population statistic (10 years)
Year	1995	2005	2015	2025
Count	61	52	79	89
Difference		−14.75%	+51.92%	+12.65%

Population statistic
Year	2024	2025
Count	90	89
Difference		−1.11%

It has a population of 89 people (31 December 2025).

=== Ethnicity ===
Census 2021 (1+ %)
Ethnicity	Number	Fraction
Slovak	82	89.13%
Not found out	10	10.86%
Moravian	1	1.08%
Total	92	

In year 2021 was 92 people by ethnicity 82 as Slovak, 10 as Not found out and 1 as Moravian.

Note on population: The difference values of population numbers in the table "Population statistic" and in the sections "Ethnicity" & "Religion" is caused by the use of various statistical methods.

=== Religion ===
Census 2021 (1+ %)
Religion	Number	Fraction
None	36	39.13%
Roman Catholic Church	34	36.96%
Evangelical Church	12	13.04%
Not found out	9	9.78%
Old Catholic Church	1	1.09%
Total	92	

In year 2021 was 92 people by religion 36 from None, 34 from Roman Catholic Church, 12 from Evangelical Church, 9 from Not found out and 1 from Old Catholic Church.
