= Abramová =

Abramová Turócábrahámfalva
- Municipality
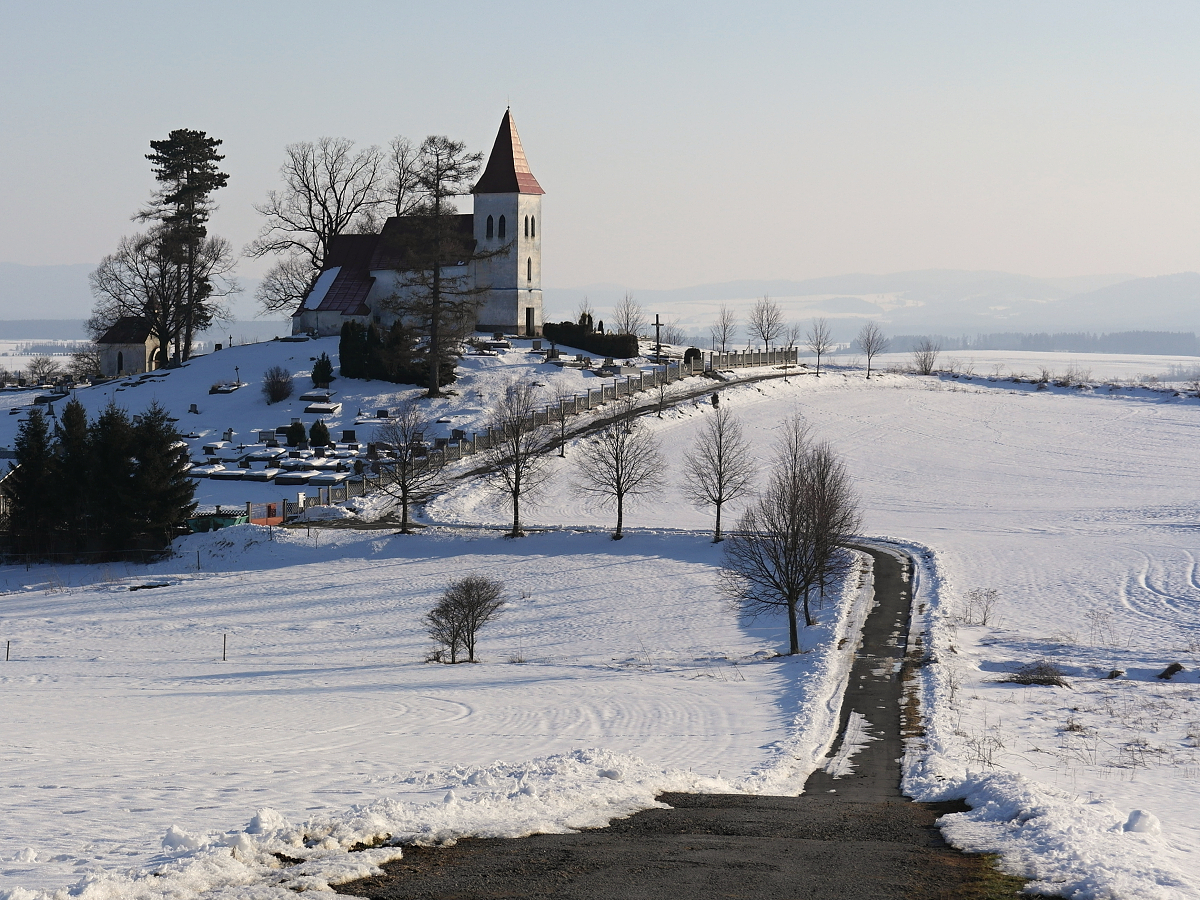

- Flag

- Location of Abramová in the Žilina Region Location of Abramová in Slovakia
- Coordinates: 48.93°N 18.80°E
- Country: Slovakia
- Region: Žilina Region
- District: Turčianske Teplice District
- First mentioned: 1400

Government
  - Mayor: Milan Černák

Area
  - Total: 12.63 km^{2} (4.88 sq mi)
- Elevation: 478 m (1,568 ft)

Population (2025)
  - Total: 199
- Time zone: UTC+1 (CET)
  - Summer (DST): UTC+2 (CEST)
- Postal code: 382 2
- Area code: +421 43
- Vehicle registration plate (until 2022): RK
- Website: www.abramova.sk

Abramová (Hungarian: Turócábrahámfalva, German: Abrahamsdorf) is a village and municipality in Turčianske Teplice District in the Žilina Region of northern central Slovakia.

== History ==
In historical records the village was first mentioned in 1400. Traditionally, it is a small village. Around year 1900, it had between 70 and 100 inhabitants, with the lowest state reaching during the 1980s, when it had only 29 people. Before the establishment of independent Czechoslovakia in 1918, it was part of Turóc County within the Kingdom of Hungary. From 1939 to 1945, it was part of the Slovak Republic.

== Geography ==
The municipality lies at an altitude of 478 metres (1,568 ft) and covers an area of 12.63 km^{2} (4.88 sq mi) (2025).

== Population ==
Population statistic (10 years)
Year	1995	2005	2015	2025
Count	156	155	178	199
Difference		−0.64%	+14.83%	+11.79%

Population statistic
Year	2024	2025
Count	194	199
Difference		+2.57%

It has a population of 199 people (31 December 2025).

=== Ethnicity ===
Census 2021 (1+ %)
Ethnicity	Number	Fraction
Slovak	148	83.14%
Not found out	29	16.29%
Czech	4	2.24%
Total	178	

In year 2021 was 178 people by ethnicity 148 as Slovak, 29 as Not found out, 4 as Czech and 1 as Other.

Note on population: The difference values of population numbers in the table "Population statistic" and in the sections "Ethnicity" & "Religion" is caused by the use of various statistical methods.

=== Religion ===
Census 2021 (1+ %)
Religion	Number	Fraction
Roman Catholic Church	68	38.2%
None	58	32.58%
Not found out	29	16.29%
Evangelical Church	20	11.24%
Total	178	

In year 2021 was 178 people by religion 68 from Roman Catholic Church, 58 from None, 29 from Not found out, 20 from Evangelical Church, 1 from Christian Congregations in Slovakia, 1 from Greek Catholic Church and 1 from Ad hoc movements.

== Genealogical resources ==
The records for genealogical research are available at the state archive in Žilina branch in Bytča (Slovak: Štátny archív v Žiline so sídlom v Bytči).

- Roman Catholic church records (births/marriages/deaths): 1679-1895
- Lutheran church records (births/marriages/deaths): 1715-1895
- Census records 1869 of Abramova are not available at the state archive.

== See also ==
- List of municipalities and towns in Slovakia
