= Veľký Čepčín =

- Municipality
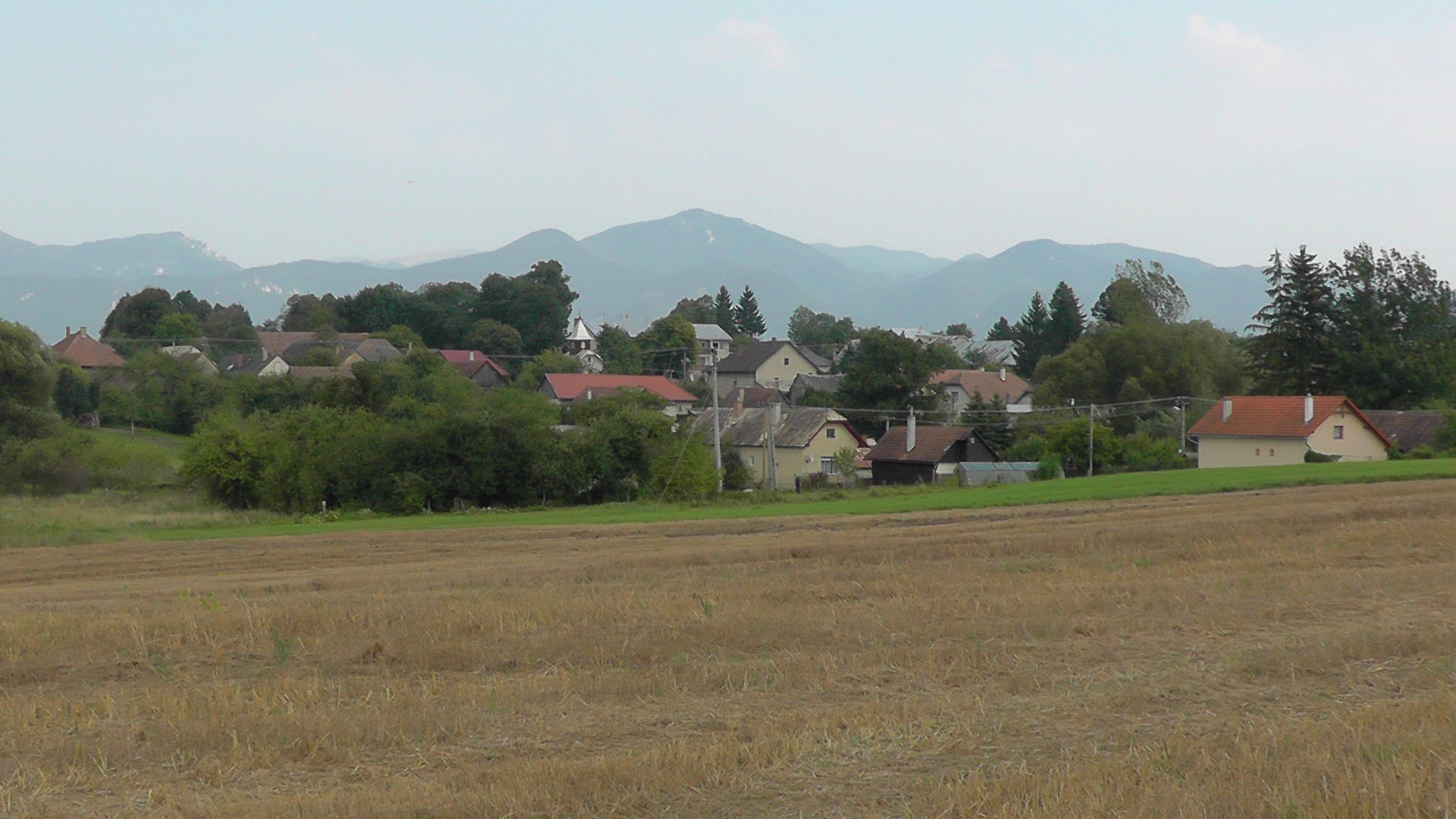

- Flag

- Location of Veľký Čepčín in the Žilina Region Location of Veľký Čepčín in Slovakia
- Coordinates: 48.90°N 18.82°E
- Country: Slovakia
- Region: Žilina Region
- District: Turčianske Teplice District
- First mentioned: 1262

Area
  - Total: 6.78 km^{2} (2.62 sq mi)
- Elevation: 473 m (1,552 ft)

Population (2025)
  - Total: 249
- Time zone: UTC+1 (CET)
  - Summer (DST): UTC+2 (CEST)
- Postal code: 384 5
- Area code: +421 43
- Vehicle registration plate (until 2022): RK

Veľký Čepčín (Hungarian: Nagycsepcsény) is a village and municipality in Turčianske Teplice District in the Žilina Region of northern central Slovakia.

== History ==
In historical records the village was first mentioned in 1262. Before the establishment of independent Czechoslovakia in 1918, it was part of Turóc County within the Kingdom of Hungary. From 1939 to 1945, it was part of the Slovak Republic.

== Geography ==
The municipality lies at an altitude of 473 metres (1,552 ft) and covers an area of 6.78 km^{2} (2.62 sq mi) (2025).

== Population ==
Population statistic (10 years)
Year	1995	2005	2015	2025
Count	211	224	249	249
Difference		+6.16%	+11.16%	−1.42%

Population statistic
Year	2024	2025
Count	258	249
Difference		−3.48%

It has a population of 249 people (31 December 2025).

=== Ethnicity ===
Census 2021 (1+ %)
Ethnicity	Number	Fraction
Slovak	239	97.95%
Not found out	4	1.63%
Total	244	

In year 2021 was 244 people by ethnicity 239 as Slovak, 4 as Not found out, 1 as Czech, 1 as Canadian and 1 as Other.

Note on population: The difference values of population numbers in the table "Population statistic" and in the sections "Ethnicity" & "Religion" is caused by the use of various statistical methods.

=== Religion ===
Census 2021 (1+ %)
Religion	Number	Fraction
Evangelical Church	87	35.66%
Roman Catholic Church	74	30.33%
None	68	27.87%
Greek Catholic Church	5	2.05%
Not found out	4	1.64%
Islam	3	1.23%
Total	244	

In year 2021 was 244 people by religion 87 from Evangelical Church, 74 from Roman Catholic Church, 68 from None, 5 from Greek Catholic Church, 4 from Not found out, 3 from Islam, 1 from Calvinist Church, 1 from Christian Congregations in Slovakia and 1 from United Methodist Church.
