= Turček =

- Municipality
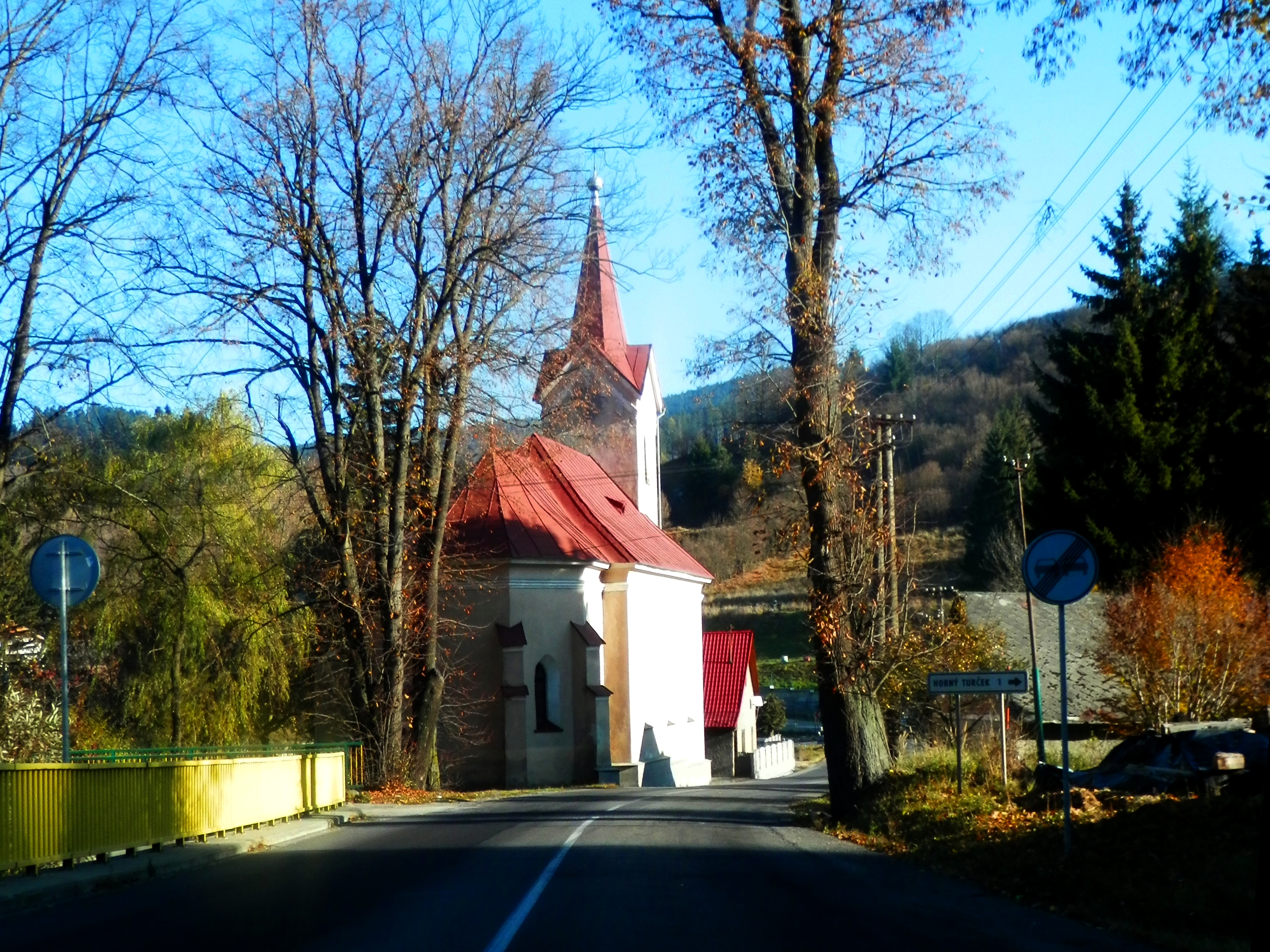

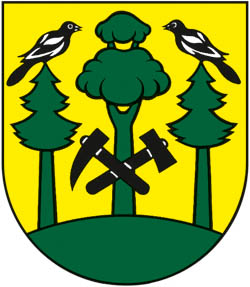
- Flag Coat of arms

- Location of Turček in the Žilina Region Location of Turček in Slovakia
- Coordinates: 48.76°N 18.91°E
- Country: Slovakia
- Region: Žilina Region
- District: Turčianske Teplice District
- First mentioned: 1371

Area
  - Total: 53.00 km^{2} (20.46 sq mi)
- Elevation: 674 m (2,211 ft)

Population (2025)
  - Total: 621
- Time zone: UTC+1 (CET)
  - Summer (DST): UTC+2 (CEST)
- Postal code: 384 8
- Area code: +421 43
- Vehicle registration plate (until 2022): RK
- Website: www.obecturcek.sk

Turček (German: Turz; Hungarian: Turcsek) is a village and municipality in Turčianske Teplice District in the Žilina Region of northern central Slovakia.

== History ==
In historical records, the village was first mentioned in 1371. Before the establishment of independent Czechoslovakia in 1918, it was part of Turóc County within the Kingdom of Hungary. From 1939 to 1945, it was part of the Slovak Republic. The village belonged to a German language island. The German population was expelled in 1945.

== Geography ==
The municipality lies at an altitude of 674 metres (2,211 ft) and covers an area of 53.00 km^{2} (20.46 sq mi) (2025).

== Population ==
Population statistic (10 years)
Year	1995	2005	2015	2025
Count	679	693	634	621
Difference		+2.06%	−8.51%	−2.05%

Population statistic
Year	2024	2025
Count	621	621
Difference		+0%

It has a population of 621 people (31 December 2025).

=== Ethnicity ===
Census 2021 (1+ %)
Ethnicity	Number	Fraction
Slovak	575	92.89%
German	41	6.62%
Not found out	31	5%
Total	619	

In year 2021 was 619 people by ethnicity 575 as Slovak, 41 as German, 31 as Not found out, 4 as Czech and 1 as Romani.

Note on population: The difference values of population numbers in the table "Population statistic" and in the sections "Ethnicity" & "Religion" is caused by the use of various statistical methods.

=== Religion ===
Census 2021 (1+ %)
Religion	Number	Fraction
Roman Catholic Church	370	59.77%
None	165	26.66%
Evangelical Church	39	6.3%
Not found out	30	4.85%
Christian Congregations in Slovakia	7	1.13%
Total	619	

In year 2021 was 619 people by religion 370 from Roman Catholic Church, 165 from None, 39 from Evangelical Church, 30 from Not found out, 7 from Christian Congregations in Slovakia, 3 from Calvinist Church, 2 from Greek Catholic Church, 1 from Old Catholic Church, 1 from Jehovah's Witnesses and 1 from Ad hoc movements.
