= Dubové, Turčianske Teplice District =

Dubové
- Municipality
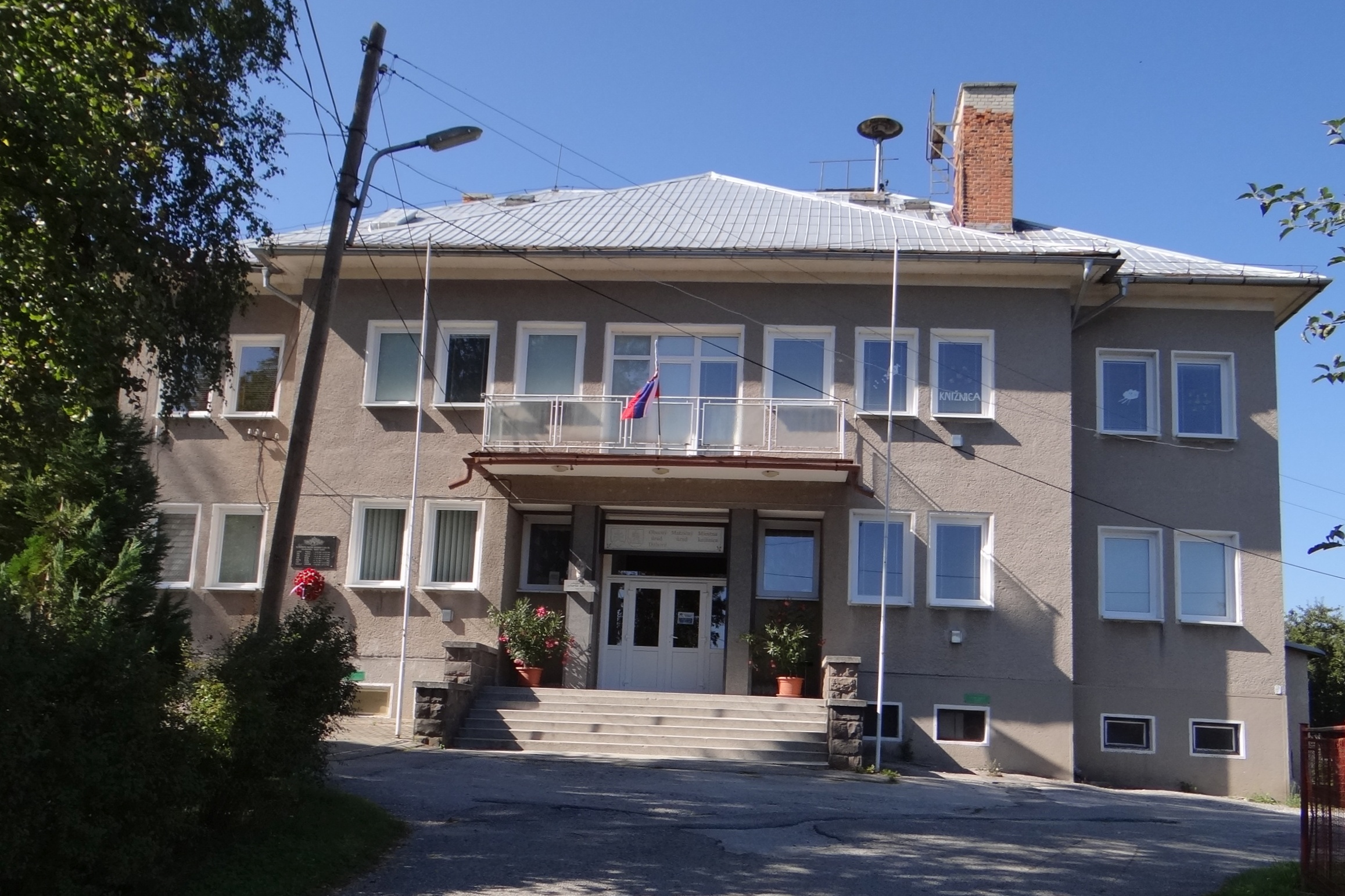

- Flag

- Location of Dubové in the Žilina Region Location of Dubové in Slovakia
- Coordinates: 48.8546°N 18.79548°E
- Country: Slovakia
- Region: Žilina Region
- District: Turčianske Teplice District
- First mentioned: 1262

Area
  - Total: 28.29 km^{2} (10.92 sq mi)
- Elevation: 484 m (1,588 ft)

Population (2025)
  - Total: 691
- Time zone: UTC+1 (CET)
  - Summer (DST): UTC+2 (CEST)
- Postal code: 382 3
- Area code: +421 43
- Vehicle registration plate (until 2022): RK
- Website: www.dubove.sk

Dubové (Hungarian: Turóctölgyes, until 1899 Dubovó, German: Daun) is a village and municipality in Turčianske Teplice District in the Žilina Region of northern central Slovakia.

== History ==
In historical records the village was first mentioned in 1262. Before the establishment of independent Czechoslovakia in 1918, it was part of Turóc County within the Kingdom of Hungary. From 1939 to 1945, it was part of the Slovak Republic.

== Geography ==
The municipality lies at an altitude of 484 metres (1,588 ft) and covers an area of 28.29 km^{2} (10.92 sq mi) (2025).

== Population ==
Population statistic (10 years)
Year	1995	2005	2015	2025
Count	750	753	718	691
Difference		+0.40%	−4.64%	−3.76%

Population statistic
Year	2024	2025
Count	688	691
Difference		+0.43%

It has a population of 691 people (31 December 2025).

=== Ethnicity ===
Census 2021 (1+ %)
Ethnicity	Number	Fraction
Slovak	678	97.13%
Not found out	20	2.86%
Total	698	

In year 2021 was 698 people by ethnicity 678 as Slovak, 20 as Not found out, 2 as Czech, 1 as Hungarian and 1 as Albanian.

Note on population: The difference values of population numbers in the table "Population statistic" and in the sections "Ethnicity" & "Religion" is caused by the use of various statistical methods.

=== Religion ===
Census 2021 (1+ %)
Religion	Number	Fraction
Evangelical Church	322	46.13%
None	178	25.5%
Roman Catholic Church	156	22.35%
Not found out	22	3.15%
Total	698	

In year 2021 was 698 people by religion 322 from Evangelical Church, 178 from None, 156 from Roman Catholic Church, 22 from Not found out, 6 from United Methodist Church, 4 from Paganism and natural spirituality, 4 from Greek Catholic Church, 2 from Other, 2 from Ad hoc movements, 1 from Eastern Orthodox Church and 1 from Buddhism.

== Genealogical resources ==
The records for genealogical research are available at the state archive "Statny Archiv in Bytca, Slovakia"

- Roman Catholic church records (births/marriages/deaths): 1690-1896 (parish B)
- Lutheran church records (births/marriages/deaths): 1715-1895 (parish B)

== See also ==
- List of municipalities and towns in Slovakia
