= Blažovce =

- Municipality
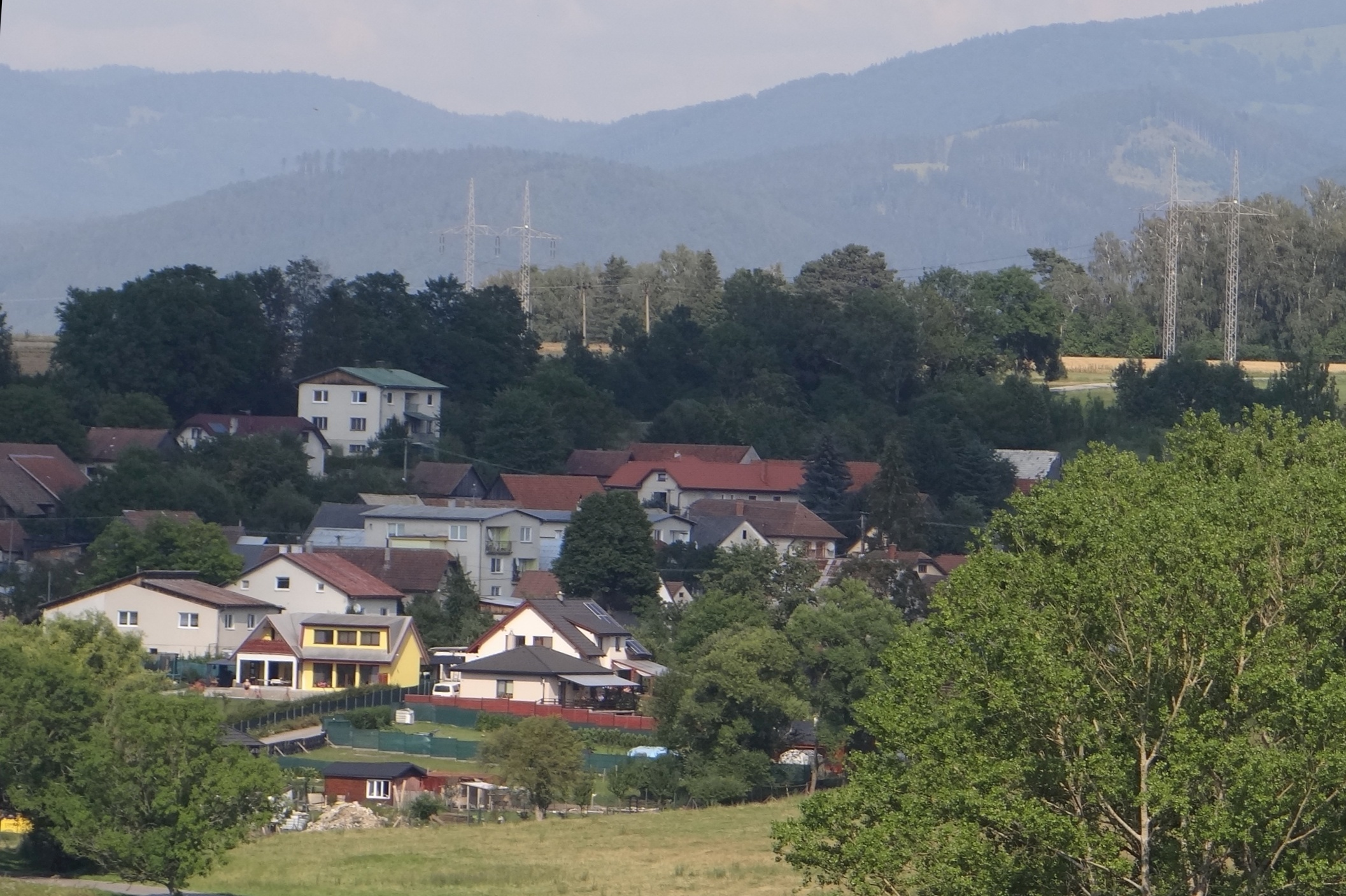

- Flag

- Location of Blažovce in the Žilina Region Location of Blažovce in Slovakia
- Coordinates: 48.94°N 18.84°E
- Country: Slovakia
- Region: Žilina Region
- District: Turčianske Teplice District
- First mentioned: 1343

Government
  - Mayor: Milan Michalka

Area
  - Total: 3.60 km^{2} (1.39 sq mi)
- Elevation: 452 m (1,483 ft)

Population (2025)
  - Total: 163
- Time zone: UTC+1 (CET)
  - Summer (DST): UTC+2 (CEST)
- Postal code: 384 4
- Area code: +421 43
- Vehicle registration plate (until 2022): RK
- Website: www.blazovce.sk

Blažovce (Hungarian: Turócbalázsfalva) is a village and municipality in Turčianske Teplice District in the Žilina Region of northern central Slovakia.

== History ==
In historical records the village was first mentioned in 1343. Before the establishment of independent Czechoslovakia in 1918, it was part of Turóc County within the Kingdom of Hungary. From 1939 to 1945, it was part of the Slovak Republic.

== Geography ==
The municipality lies at an altitude of 452 metres (1,483 ft) and covers an area of 3.60 km^{2} (1.39 sq mi) (2025).

== Population ==
Population statistic (10 years)
Year	1995	2005	2015	2025
Count	165	167	162	163
Difference		+1.21%	−2.99%	+0.61%

Population statistic
Year	2024	2025
Count	165	163
Difference		−1.21%

It has a population of 163 people (31 December 2025).

=== Ethnicity ===
Census 2021 (1+ %)
Ethnicity	Number	Fraction
Slovak	158	97.53%
Czech	3	1.85%
Not found out	2	1.23%
Total	162	

In year 2021 was 162 people by ethnicity 158 as Slovak, 3 as Czech, 2 as Not found out and 1 as Jewish.

Note on population: The difference values of population numbers in the table "Population statistic" and in the sections "Ethnicity" & "Religion" is caused by the use of various statistical methods.

=== Religion ===
Census 2021 (1+ %)
Religion	Number	Fraction
Roman Catholic Church	54	33.33%
None	54	33.33%
Evangelical Church	46	28.4%
Not found out	7	4.32%
Total	162	

In year 2021 was 162 people by religion 54 from Roman Catholic Church, 54 from None, 46 from Evangelical Church, 7 from Not found out and 1 from Jewish community.

== Genealogical resources ==
The records for genealogical research are available at the state archive "Statny Archiv in Bytca, Slovakia"

- Roman Catholic church records (births/marriages/deaths): 1690-1950 (parish B)
- Lutheran church records (births/marriages/deaths): 1715-1895 (parish B)

== See also ==
- List of municipalities and towns in Slovakia
