= Ivančiná =

- Municipality
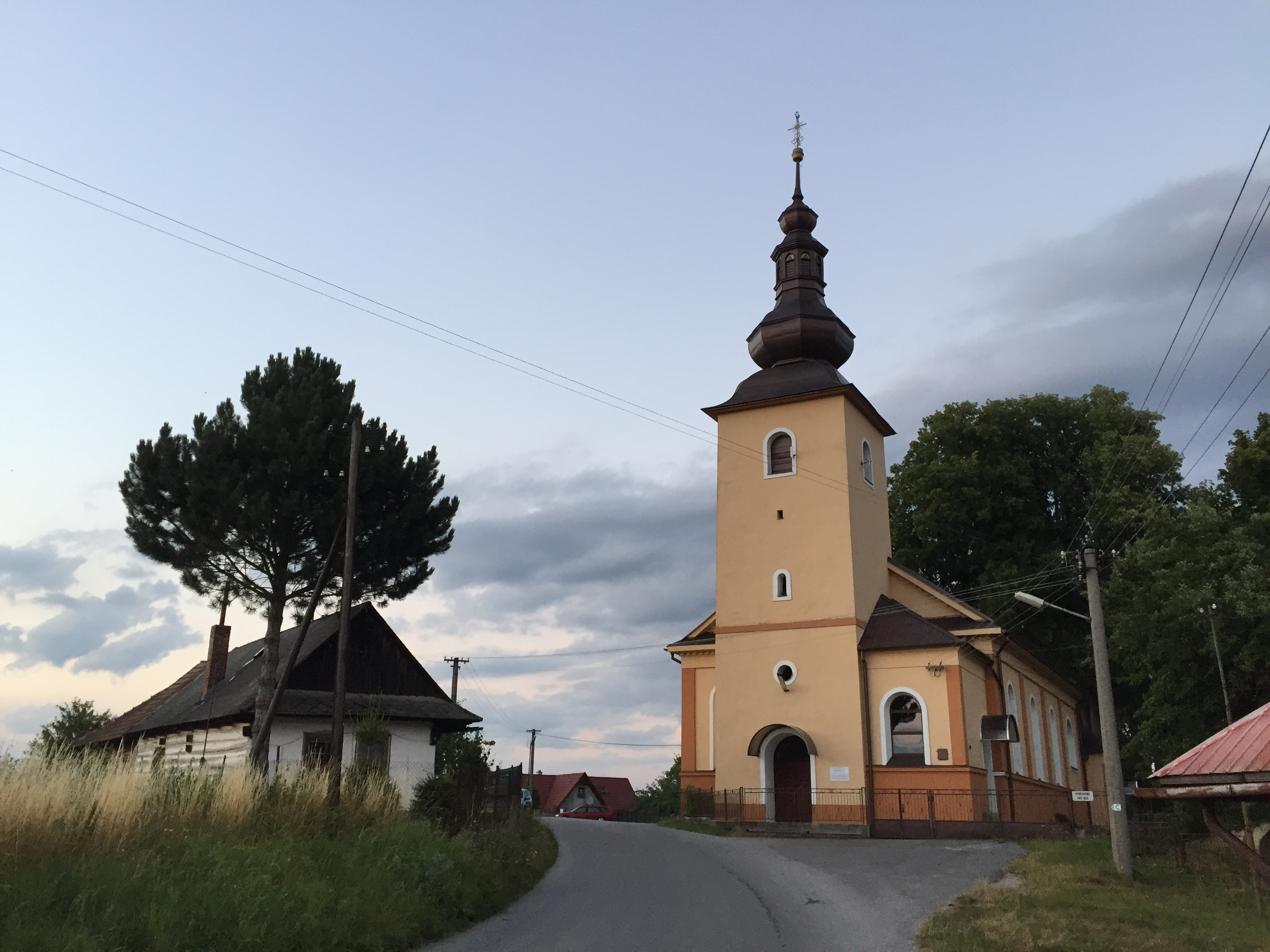

- Flag

- Location of Ivančiná in the Žilina Region Location of Ivančiná in Slovakia
- Coordinates: 48.91°N 18.81°E
- Country: Slovakia
- Region: Žilina Region
- District: Turčianske Teplice District
- First mentioned: 1248

Area
  - Total: 3.54 km^{2} (1.37 sq mi)
- Elevation: 455 m (1,493 ft)

Population (2025)
  - Total: 94
- Time zone: UTC+1 (CET)
  - Summer (DST): UTC+2 (CEST)
- Postal code: 384 5
- Area code: +421 43
- Vehicle registration plate (until 2022): RK
- Website: www.obecivancina.sk

Ivančiná (Hungarian: Ivánkafalva) is a village and municipality in Turčianske Teplice District in the Žilina Region of northern central Slovakia.

== History ==
In historical records the village was first mentioned in 1248. Before the establishment of independent Czechoslovakia in 1918, it was part of Turóc County within the Kingdom of Hungary. From 1939 to 1945, it was part of the Slovak Republic.

== Geography ==
The municipality lies at an altitude of 455 metres (1,493 ft) and covers an area of 3.54 km^{2} (1.37 sq mi) (2025).

== Population ==
Population statistic (10 years)
Year	1995	2005	2015	2025
Count	90	98	86	94
Difference		+8.88%	−12.24%	+9.30%

Population statistic
Year	2024	2025
Count	93	94
Difference		+1.07%

It has a population of 94 people (31 December 2025).

=== Ethnicity ===
Census 2021 (1+ %)
Ethnicity	Number	Fraction
Slovak	85	94.44%
Not found out	3	3.33%
Other	2	2.22%
Czech	1	1.11%
Moravian	1	1.11%
Hungarian	1	1.11%
Total	90	

In year 2021 was 90 people by ethnicity 85 as Slovak, 3 as Not found out, 2 as Other, 1 as Czech, 1 as Moravian and 1 as Hungarian.

Note on population: The difference values of population numbers in the table "Population statistic" and in the sections "Ethnicity" & "Religion" is caused by the use of various statistical methods.

=== Religion ===
Census 2021 (1+ %)
Religion	Number	Fraction
Evangelical Church	32	35.56%
None	32	35.56%
Roman Catholic Church	21	23.33%
Other and not ascertained christian church	1	1.11%
Not found out	1	1.11%
Czechoslovak Hussite Church	1	1.11%
Buddhism	1	1.11%
Ad hoc movements	1	1.11%
Total	90	

In year 2021 was 90 people by religion 32 from Evangelical Church, 32 from None, 21 from Roman Catholic Church, 1 from Other and not ascertained christian church, 1 from Not found out, 1 from Czechoslovak Hussite Church, 1 from Buddhism and 1 from Ad hoc movements.

== Genealogical resources ==
The records for genealogical research are available at the state archive "Statny Archiv in Bytca, Slovakia"

- Roman Catholic church records (births/marriages/deaths): 1690-1896 (parish B)
- Lutheran church records (births/marriages/deaths): 1715-1895 (parish A)

== See also ==
- List of municipalities and towns in Slovakia
