= Háj, Turčianske Teplice District =

Háj
- Municipality
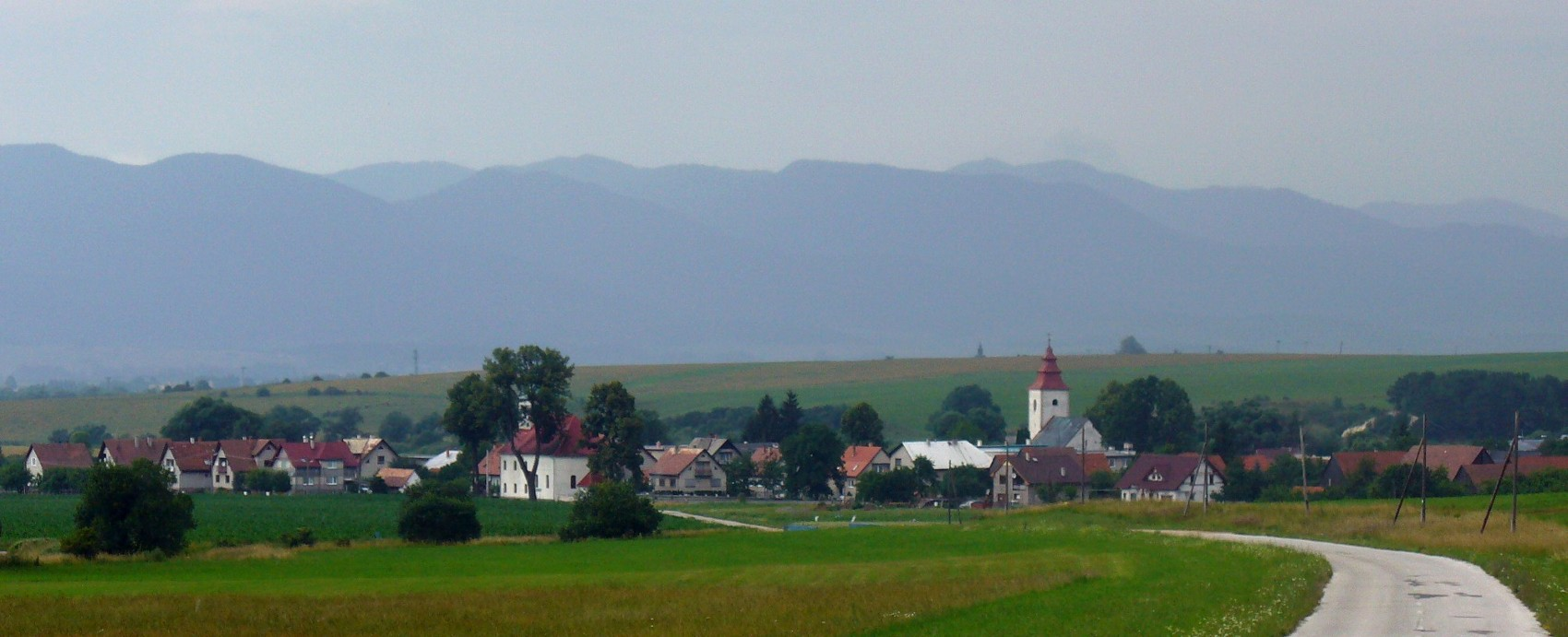

- Flag

- Location of Háj in the Žilina Region Location of Háj in Slovakia
- Coordinates: 48°52′N 18°53′E
- Country: Slovakia
- Region: Žilina Region
- District: Turčianske Teplice District
- First mentioned: 1264

Area
  - Total: 9.33 km^{2} (3.60 sq mi)
- Elevation: 509 m (1,670 ft)

Population (2025)
  - Total: 455
- Time zone: UTC+1 (CET)
  - Summer (DST): UTC+2 (CEST)
- Postal code: 390 1
- Area code: +421 43
- Vehicle registration plate (until 2022): RK
- Website: www.obechaj.sk

Háj (Hungarian: Turócliget, German: Häu) is a village and municipality in Turčianske Teplice District in the Žilina Region of northern central Slovakia.

== History ==
In historical records, the village was first mentioned in 1264. In 1281 King Ladislaus IV gave Háj to Peter, son of Nicholas, as a hereditary estate. In 1535 King Ferdinand I granted the Háj estate, which included the thermal baths of Turčianske Teplice, to the town of Kremnica. Before the establishment of independent Czechoslovakia in 1918, it was part of Turóc County within the Kingdom of Hungary. From 1939 to 1945, it was part of the Slovak Republic.

== Geography ==
The municipality lies at an altitude of 509 metres (1,670 ft) and covers an area of 9.33 km^{2} (3.60 sq mi) (2025).

== Population ==
Population statistic (10 years)
Year	1995	2005	2015	2025
Count	440	484	454	455
Difference		+10%	−6.19%	+0.22%

Population statistic
Year	2024	2025
Count	469	455
Difference		−2.98%

It has a population of 455 people (31 December 2025).

=== Ethnicity ===
Census 2021 (1+%)
Ethnicity	Number	Fraction
Slovak	454	98.26%
Not found out	7	1.51%
Total	462	

In year 2021 was 462 people by ethnicity 454 as Slovak, 7 as Not found out, 4 as Czech, 1 as Serbian, 1 as German and 1 as Hungarian.

Note on population: The difference values of population numbers in the table "Population statistic" and in the sections "Ethnicity" & "Religion" is caused by the use of various statistical methods.

=== Religion ===
Census 2021 (1+%)
Religion	Number	Fraction
Evangelical Church	230	49.78%
Roman Catholic Church	126	27.27%
None	86	18.61%
Not found out	12	2.6%
Total	462	

In year 2021 was 462 people by religion 230 from Evangelical Church, 126 from Roman Catholic Church, 86 from None, 12 from Not found out, 2 from Calvinist Church, 2 from Eastern Orthodox Church, 2 from Ad hoc movements, 1 from Other and 1 from Greek Catholic Church.

== Genealogical resources ==
The records for genealogical research are available at the state archive "Statny Archiv in Bytca, Slovakia".

- Roman Catholic church records (births/marriages/deaths): 1674–1896 (parish A)
- Lutheran church records (births/marriages/deaths): 1820–1923 (parish A)

== See also ==
- List of municipalities and towns in Slovakia
