= Borcová =

- Municipality
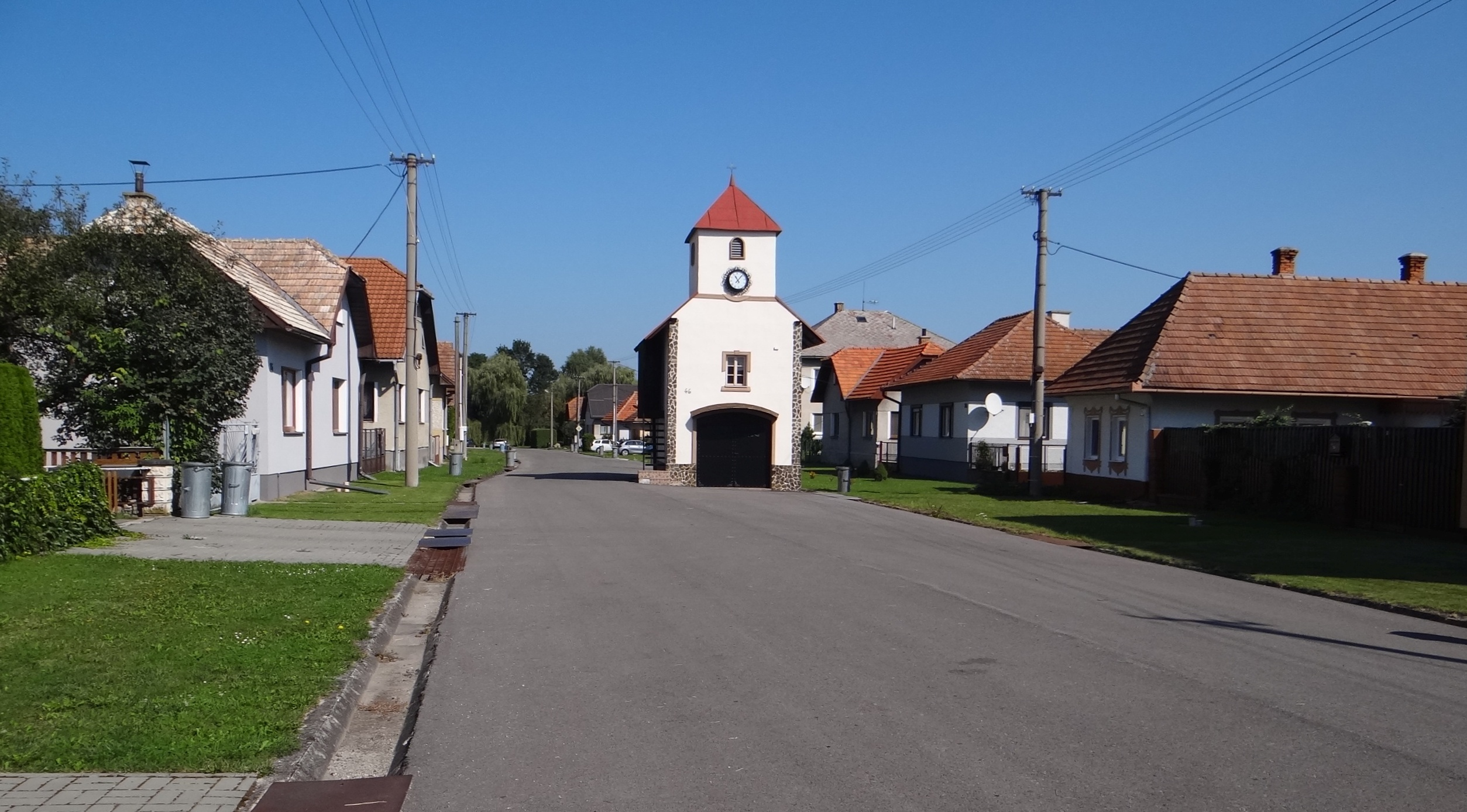

- Flag

- Location of Borcová in the Žilina Region Location of Borcová in Slovakia
- Coordinates: 48.93°N 18.85°E
- Country: Slovakia
- Region: Žilina Region
- District: Turčianske Teplice District
- First mentioned: 1302

Government
  - Mayor: Mgr. Marcela Pavlaskova

Area
  - Total: 2.09 km^{2} (0.81 sq mi)
- Elevation: 449 m (1,473 ft)

Population (2025)
  - Total: 146
- Time zone: UTC+1 (CET)
  - Summer (DST): UTC+2 (CEST)
- Postal code: 384 4
- Area code: +421 43
- Vehicle registration plate (until 2022): RK

Borcová (Hungarian: Borcfalu) is a village and municipality in Turčianske Teplice District in the Žilina Region of northern central Slovakia.

== History ==
In historical records the village was first mentioned in 1302. Before the establishment of independent Czechoslovakia in 1918, it was part of Turóc County within the Kingdom of Hungary. From 1939 to 1945, it was part of the Slovak Republic.

== Geography ==
The municipality lies at an altitude of 449 metres (1,473 ft) and covers an area of 2.09 km^{2} (0.81 sq mi) (2025).

== Population ==
Population statistic (10 years)
| Year | 1995 | 2005 | 2015 | 2025 |
|---|---|---|---|---|
| Count | 109 | 121 | 150 | 146 |
| Difference | | +11.00% | +23.96% | −2.66% |

Population statistic
| Year | 2024 | 2025 |
|---|---|---|
| Count | 153 | 146 |
| Difference | | −4.57% |

It has a population of 146 people (31 December 2025).

=== Ethnicity ===
Census 2021 (1+ %)
| Ethnicity | Number | Fraction |
|---|---|---|
| Slovak | 146 | 100% |
| Other | 3 | 2.05% |
| Total | 146 | |

In year 2021 was 146 people by ethnicity 146 as Slovak and 3 as Other.

Note on population: The difference values of population numbers in the table "Population statistic" and in the sections "Ethnicity" & "Religion" is caused by the use of various statistical methods.

=== Religion ===
Census 2021 (1+ %)
| Religion | Number | Fraction |
|---|---|---|
| Roman Catholic Church | 67 | 45.89% |
| Evangelical Church | 40 | 27.4% |
| None | 27 | 18.49% |
| Christian Congregations in Slovakia | 7 | 4.79% |
| Greek Catholic Church | 3 | 2.05% |
| Total | 146 | |

In year 2021 was 146 people by religion 67 from Roman Catholic Church, 40 from Evangelical Church, 27 from None, 7 from Christian Congregations in Slovakia, 3 from Greek Catholic Church, 1 from United Methodist Church and 1 from Ad hoc movements.

== Genealogical resources ==
The records for genealogical research are available at the state archive "Statny Archiv in Bytca, Slovakia"

- Roman Catholic church records (births/marriages/deaths): 1690-1950 (parish B)

== See also ==
- List of municipalities and towns in Slovakia
