= Sklené, Turčianske Teplice District =

Sklené
- Municipality
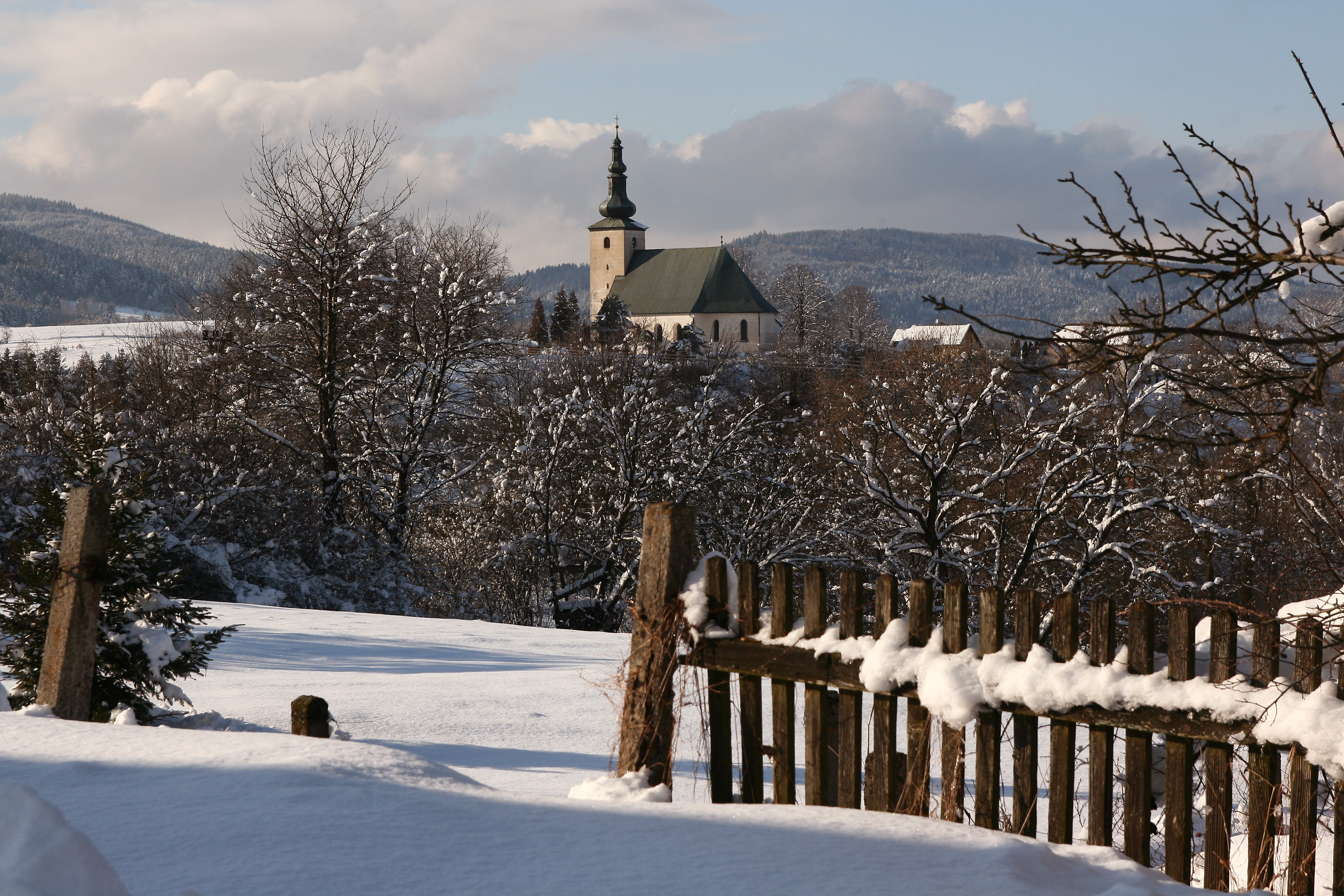

- Location of Sklené in the Žilina Region Location of Sklené in Slovakia
- Coordinates: 48°47′N 18°50′E
- Country: Slovakia
- Region: Žilina Region
- District: Turčianske Teplice District
- First mentioned: 1360

Area
  - Total: 40.50 km^{2} (15.64 sq mi)
- Elevation: 580 m (1,900 ft)

Population (2025)
  - Total: 673
- Time zone: UTC+1 (CET)
  - Summer (DST): UTC+2 (CEST)
- Postal code: 384 7
- Area code: +421 43
- Vehicle registration plate (until 2022): RK
- Website: www.sklene.eu

Sklené (German: Glaserhau; Hungarian: Turócnémeti) is a village and municipality in Turčianske Teplice District in the Žilina Region of northern central Slovakia.

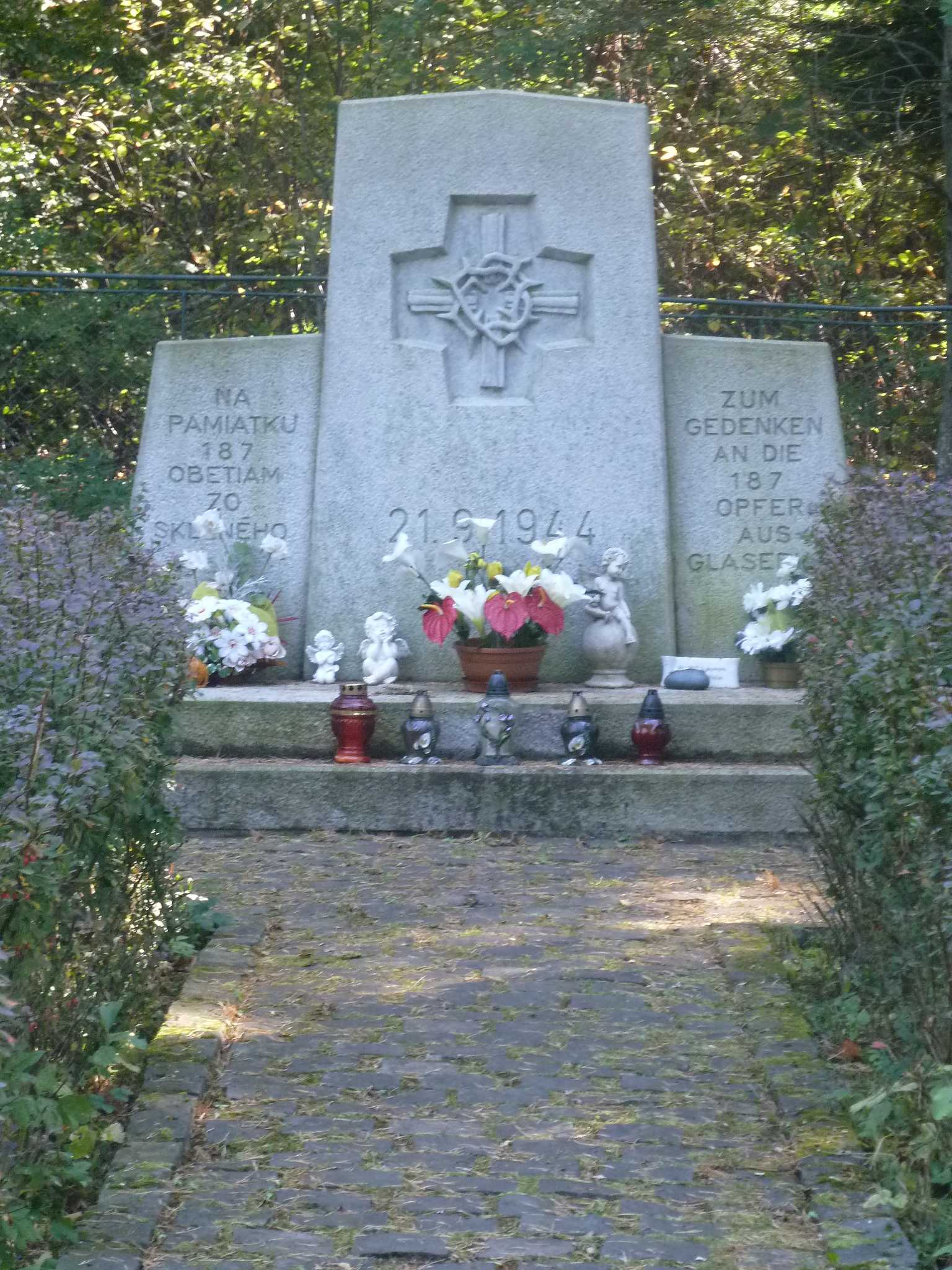
Mass grave and memorial

== History ==
In historical records the village was first mentioned in 1360. Before the establishment of independent Czechoslovakia in 1918, it was part of Turóc County within the Kingdom of Hungary. From 1939 to 1945, it was part of the Slovak Republic. Until the end of World War II his village was called Glaserhau and populated mostly by German Catholic farmers who had originally migrated here in the 1400 as gold miners. During the Slovak National Uprising Slovak partisans committed a massacre on 21 September 1944 among the German population of the village, killing 186 inhabitants. Since 1994 a memorial commemorates the victims.

== Geography ==
The municipality lies at an altitude of 580 metres (1,900 ft) and covers an area of 40.50 km^{2} (15.64 sq mi) (2025).

== Population ==
Population statistic (10 years)
Year	1995	2005	2015	2025
Count	859	782	733	673
Difference		−8.96%	−6.26%	−8.18%

Population statistic
Year	2024	2025
Count	666	673
Difference		+1.05%

It has a population of 673 people (31 December 2025).

=== Ethnicity ===
Census 2021 (1+ %)
Ethnicity	Number	Fraction
Slovak	655	95.48%
Not found out	26	3.79%
German	7	1.02%
Total	686	

In year 2021 was 686 people by ethnicity 655 as Slovak, 26 as Not found out, 7 as German, 6 as Czech, 2 as Hungarian, 1 as Polish, 1 as Greek and 1 as Bulgarian.

Note on population: The difference values of population numbers in the table "Population statistic" and in the sections "Ethnicity" & "Religion" is caused by the use of various statistical methods.

=== Religion ===
Census 2021 (1+ %)
Religion	Number	Fraction
Roman Catholic Church	402	58.6%
None	200	29.15%
Evangelical Church	31	4.52%
Not found out	23	3.35%
Greek Catholic Church	12	1.75%
Total	686	

In year 2021 was 686 people by religion 402 from Roman Catholic Church, 200 from None, 31 from Evangelical Church, 23 from Not found out, 12 from Greek Catholic Church, 4 from Christian Congregations in Slovakia, 4 from Ad hoc movements, 3 from Other, 2 from Other and not ascertained christian church, 2 from United Methodist Church, 1 from Paganism and natural spirituality, 1 from Jehovah's Witnesses and 1 from Seventh-day Adventist Church.
