= Liešno =

- Municipality
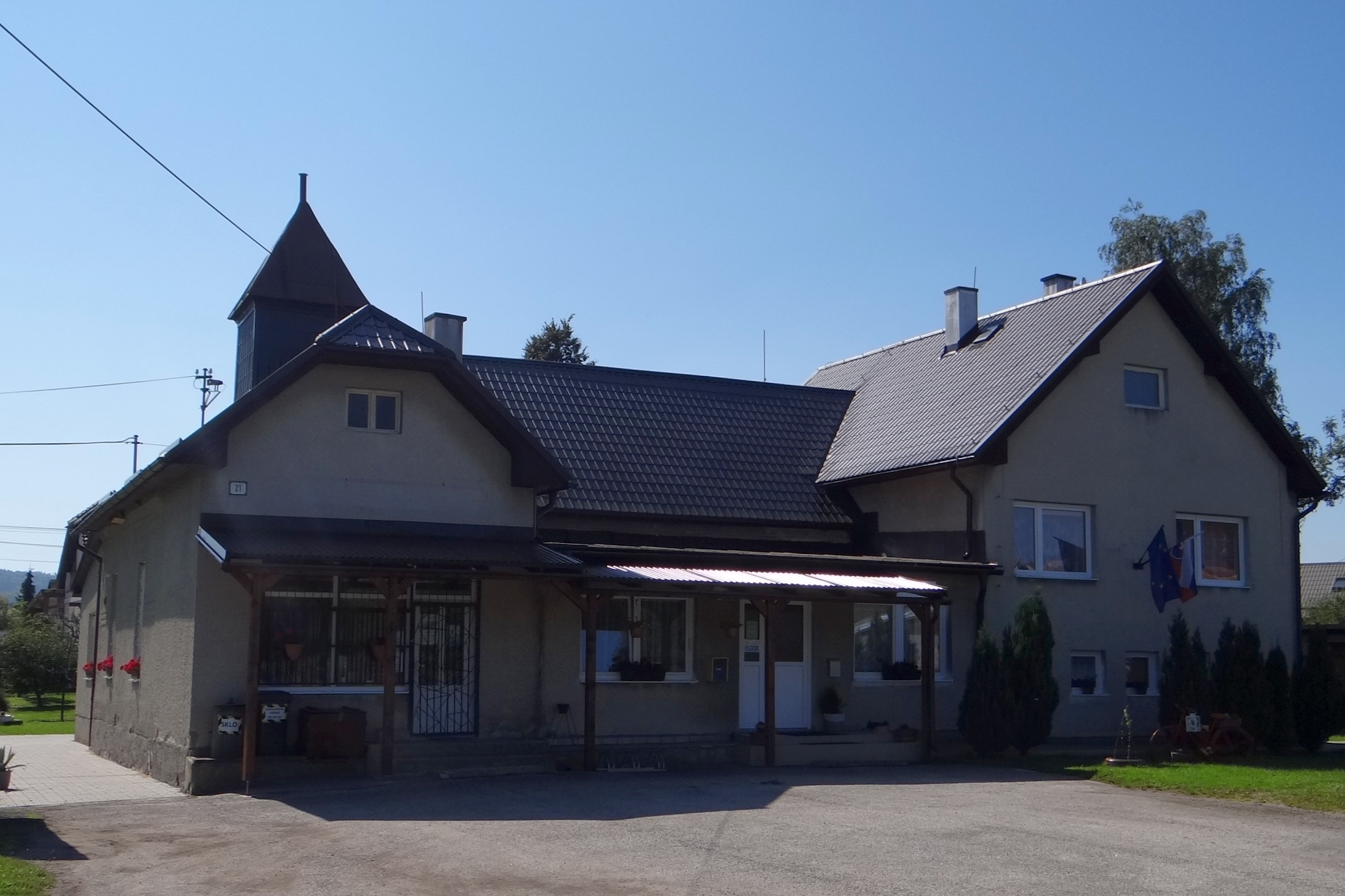

- Flag

- Location of Liešno in the Žilina Region Location of Liešno in Slovakia
- Coordinates: 48.88°N 18.77°E
- Country: Slovakia
- Region: Žilina Region
- District: Turčianske Teplice District
- First mentioned: 1322

Area
  - Total: 1.94 km^{2} (0.75 sq mi)
- Elevation: 470 m (1,540 ft)

Population (2025)
  - Total: 48
- Time zone: UTC+1 (CET)
  - Summer (DST): UTC+2 (CEST)
- Postal code: 382 2
- Area code: +421 43
- Vehicle registration plate (until 2022): RK
- Website: www.liesno.sk

Liešno (Hungarian: Turócerdőd; until 1899 Liesznó, German: Liexen) is a village and municipality in Turčianske Teplice District in the Žilina Region of northern central Slovakia.

== History ==
In historical records the village was first mentioned in 1322. Before the establishment of independent Czechoslovakia in 1918, it was part of Turóc County within the Kingdom of Hungary. From 1939 to 1945, it was part of the Slovak Republic.

== Geography ==
The municipality lies at an altitude of 470 metres (1,540 ft) and covers an area of 1.94 km^{2} (0.75 sq mi) (2025).

== Population ==
Population statistic (10 years)
Year	1995	2005	2015	2025
Count	67	54	57	48
Difference		−19.40%	+5.55%	−15.78%

Population statistic
Year	2024	2025
Count	52	48
Difference		−7.69%

It has a population of 48 people (31 December 2025).

=== Ethnicity ===
Census 2021 (1+ %)
Ethnicity	Number	Fraction
Slovak	56	100%
Russian	2	3.57%
Total	56	

In year 2021 was 56 people by ethnicity 56 as Slovak and 2 as Russian.

Note on population: The difference values of population numbers in the table "Population statistic" and in the sections "Ethnicity" & "Religion" is caused by the use of various statistical methods.

=== Religion ===
Census 2021 (1+ %)
Religion	Number	Fraction
Evangelical Church	27	48.21%
Roman Catholic Church	17	30.36%
None	9	16.07%
Eastern Orthodox Church	1	1.79%
Other	1	1.79%
United Methodist Church	1	1.79%
Total	56	

In year 2021 was 56 people by religion 27 from Evangelical Church, 17 from Roman Catholic Church, 9 from None, 1 from Eastern Orthodox Church, 1 from Other and 1 from United Methodist Church.
