= Turčianske Teplice District =

District of Slovakia

- District
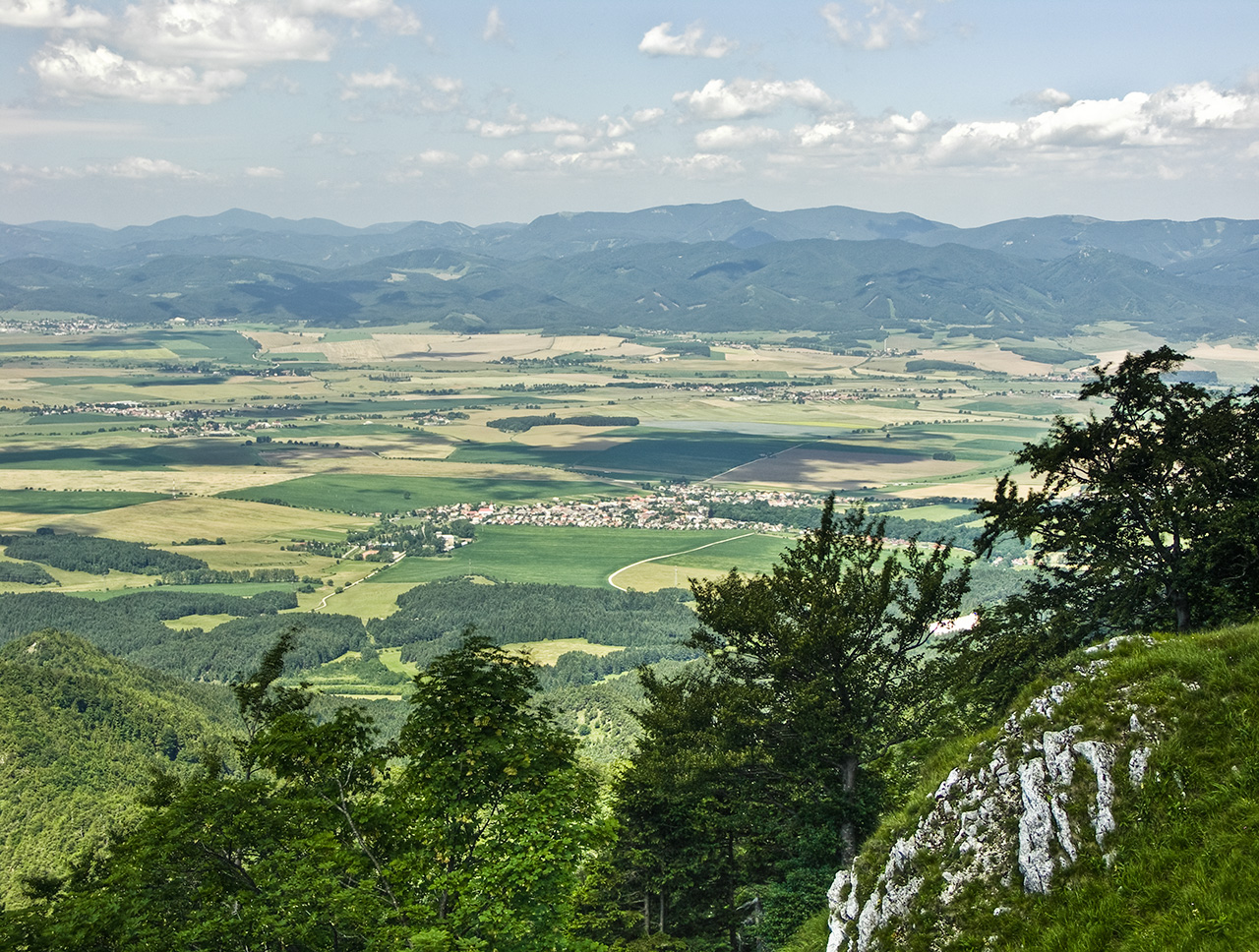
- The Turiec Basin from Drieňok Mountain
- Country: Slovakia
- Region: Žilina Region
- Cultural region: Turiec
- Seat: Turčianske Teplice

Area
  - Total: 392.86 km^{2} (151.68 sq mi)

Population (2025)
  - Total: 15,580
- Time zone: UTC+1 (CET)
  - Summer (DST): UTC+2 (CEST)
- Telephone prefix: 43
- Vehicle registration plate (until 2022): TR
- Municipalities: 26

Turčianske Teplice District (okres Turčianske Teplice) is a district in the Žilina Region of central Slovakia. Until 1920, the district was part of Turóc County, Kingdom of Hungary.

== Population ==
Population statistic (10 years)
Year	1995	2005	2015	2025
Count	16,905	16,720	16,118	15,580
Difference		−1.09%	−3.60%	−3.33%

Population statistic
Year	2024	2025
Count	15,646	15,580
Difference		−0.42%

It has a population of 15,580 people (31 December 2025).

Historical population
Year	Pop.	±%
1970	18,211	—
1980	17,639	−3.1%
1991	17,078	−3.2%
2001	16,866	−1.2%
2011	16,379	−2.9%
2021	15,956	−2.6%
Source: Statistical Office of the Slovak Republic

=== Ethnicity ===
Census 2021 (1+ %)
Ethnicity	Number	Fraction
Slovak	15,173	93.03%
Not found out	670	4.1%
Total	16,309	

In year 2021 was 16,309 people by ethnicity 15,173 as Slovak, 670 as Not found out, 151 as German, 126 as Czech, 39 as Other, 28 as Hungarian, 22 as Romani, 22 as Russian, 17 as Rusyn, 14 as Polish, 10 as Ukrainian, 7 as Chinese, 4 as Italian, 4 as Moravian, 4 as Greek, 4 as English, 3 as Serbian, 3 as Romanian, 3 as Bulgarian, 1 as Jewish, 1 as Turkish, 1 as Canadian, 1 as Croatian and 1 as Albanian.

Note on population: The difference values of population numbers in the table "Population statistic" and in the sections "Ethnicity" & "Religion" is caused by the use of various statistical methods.

=== Religion ===
Census 2021 (1+ %)
Religion	Number	Fraction
Roman Catholic Church	6082	38.12%
None	4629	29.01%
Evangelical Church	4018	25.18%
Not found out	770	4.83%
Total	15,956	

In year 2021 was 15,956 people by religion 6082 from Roman Catholic Church, 4629 from None, 4018 from Evangelical Church, 770 from Not found out, 119 from Greek Catholic Church, 47 from Apostolic Church, 45 from Other, 45 from Ad hoc movements, 43 from United Methodist Church, 32 from Christian Congregations in Slovakia, 19 from Other and not ascertained christian church, 16 from Eastern Orthodox Church, 14 from Paganism and natural spirituality, 14 from Islam, 14 from Buddhism, 12 from Calvinist Church, 10 from Jehovah's Witnesses, 6 from Church of the Brethren, 5 from Old Catholic Church, 5 from Hinduism, 4 from Seventh-day Adventist Church, 2 from Jewish community, 2 from Czechoslovak Hussite Church, 2 from Church of Jesus Christ of Latter-day Saints and 1 from Baptists Church.

== Municipalities ==
Municipality	Area [km^{2}]	Population
Abramová	12.63	199
Blažovce	3.60	163
Bodorová	5.11	235
Borcová	2.09	146
Brieštie	11.17	125
Budiš	10.27	193
Čremošné	16.17	85
Dubové	28.29	691
Háj	9.33	455
Horná Štubňa	31.38	1,621
Ivančiná	3.54	94
Jasenovo	8.33	123
Jazernica	2.92	371
Kaľamenová	5.79	100
Liešno	1.94	48
Malý Čepčín	3.09	532
Moškovec	2.10	84
Mošovce	57.97	1,364
Ondrašová	6.98	89
Rakša	11.73	225
Rudno	7.27	218
Sklené	40.50	673
Slovenské Pravno	17.16	880
Turček	53.00	621
Turčianske Teplice	33.48	5,996
Veľký Čepčín	6.78	249

Population and area values are current for year 2025.
