= Turóc County =

County of the Kingdom of Hungary

Turóc County Comitatus Thurociensis (Latin) Túróc vármegye (Hungarian) Komitat Turz (German) Turčianska župa (Slovak)
- County of the Kingdom of Hungary
- 14th century–1920
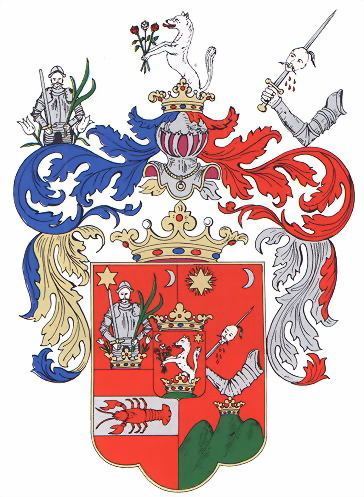
- Coat of arms

- Capital: Turócszentmárton
- Area
  - Coordinates: 49°4′N 18°55′E
  - 1910: 1,123 km^{2} (434 sq mi)
- Population
  - 1910: 55,703
- History
  - Established: 14th century
  - Treaty of Trianon: 4 June 1920
- Today part of: Slovakia
- Martin is the current name of the capital

Turóc (Hungarian, historically also spelled Túrócz), Slovak: Turiec, Latin: Thurotzium/comitatus Thurociensis, German: Turz) was an administrative county (comitatus) of the Kingdom of Hungary. Its territory is now in north-western Slovakia, where the corresponding Slovak name Turiec is only an informal designation of the corresponding territory.

== Geography ==
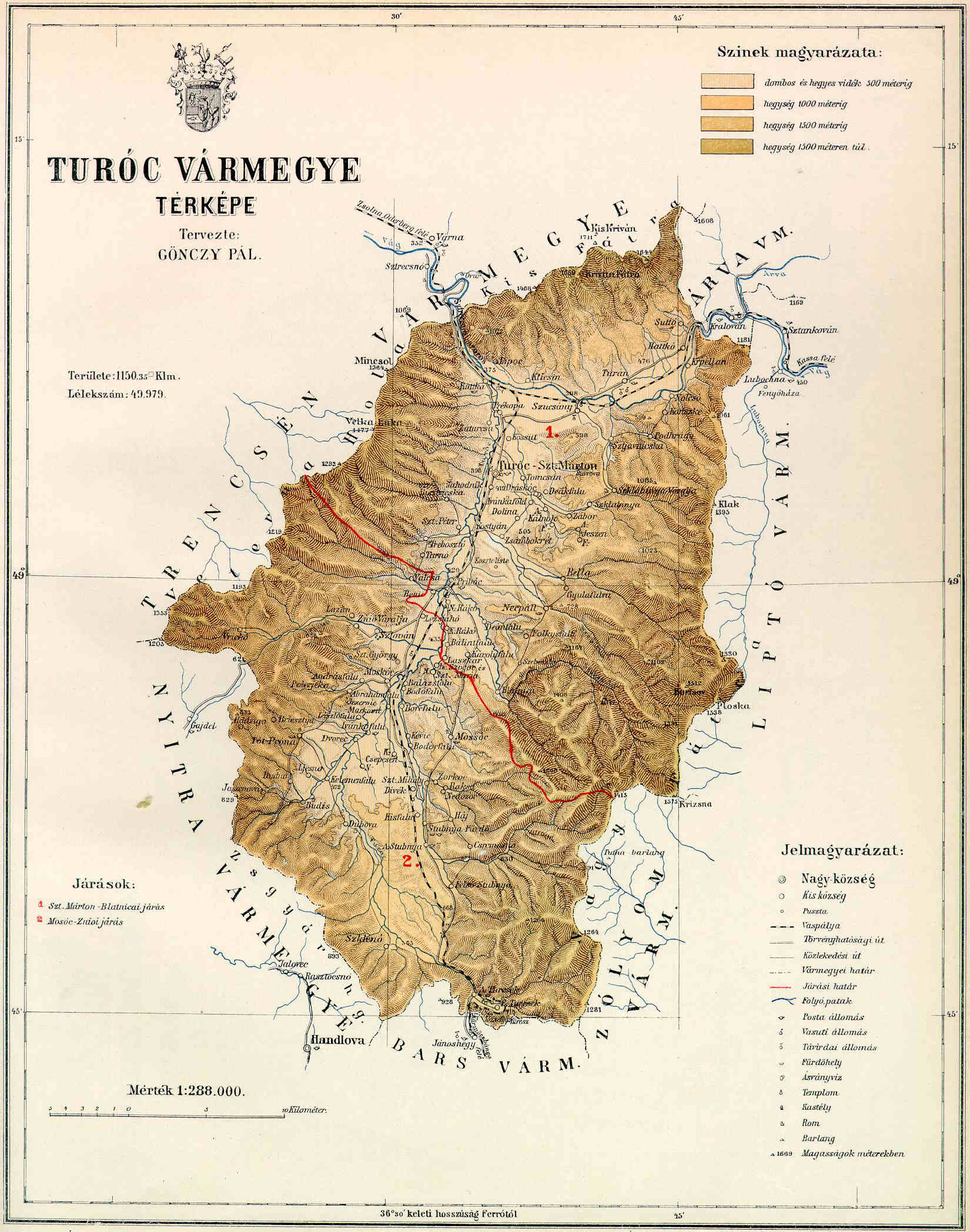
Map of Túróc, 1891.

Turóc county shared borders with the counties of Nyitra, Trencsén, Árva, Liptó, Zólyom and Bars, situated between the Lesser Fatra (Kis-Fátra) and Greater Fatra (Nagy-Fátra) Mountains. The river Turóc flowed through the county. Its area was 1123 km^{2} around 1910.

== Capitals ==
The capitals of the Turóc county were the Szklabinya Castle and Turócszentmárton (present-day Martin; Slovak name until 1950: Turčiansky Svätý Martin); from 1772 only Turócszentmárton was the capital.

== History ==
Turóc county as a Hungarian comitatus arose in the 14th century. In the aftermath of World War I, the area of the now defunct Turóc county became part of newly formed Czechoslovakia, as recognized by the concerned states in 1920 by the Treaty of Trianon. The territory of the county is now part of Slovakia.

== Demographics ==
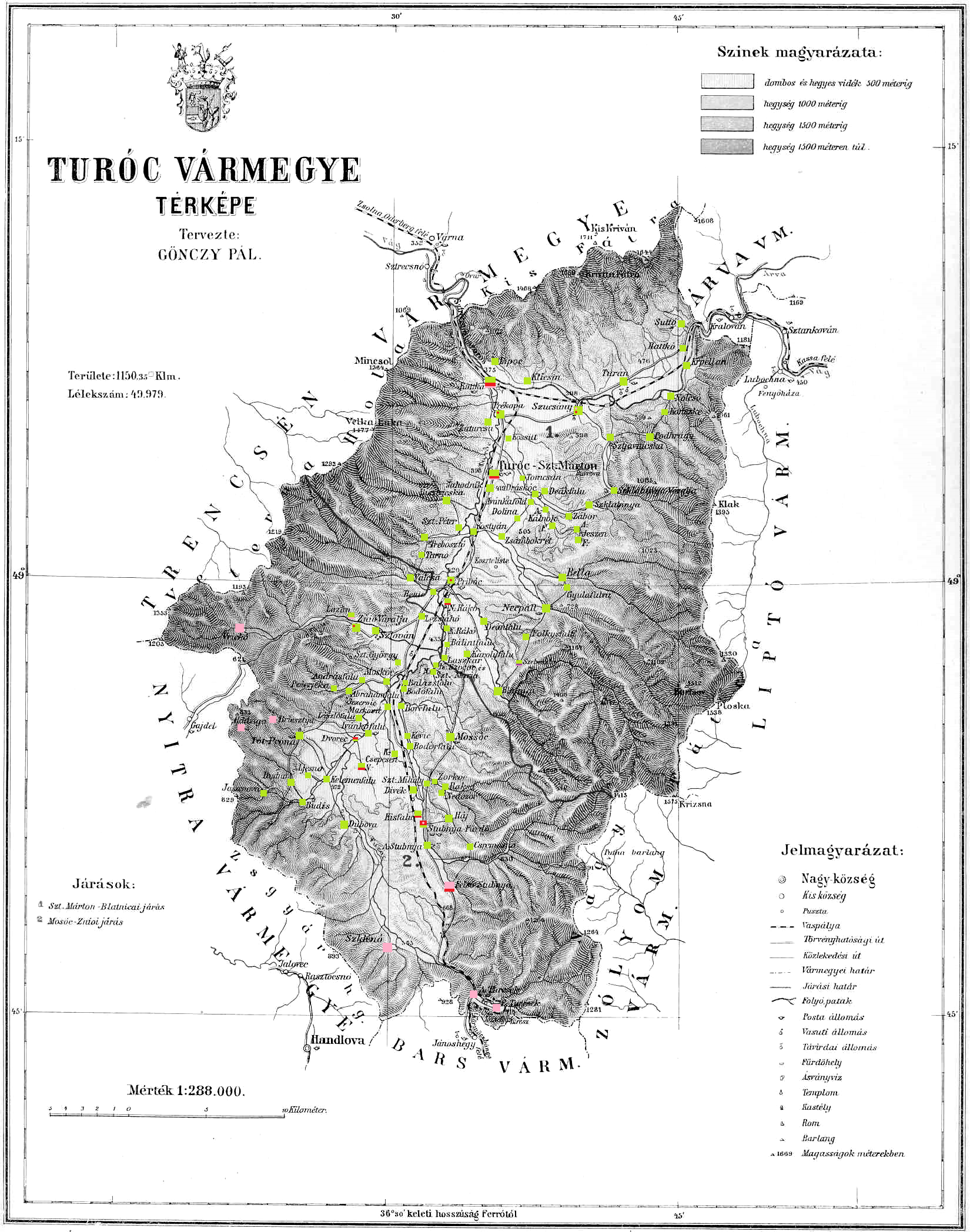
Ethnic map of the county with data of the 1910 census (see the key in the description).

Population by mother tongue (Note: Only linguistic communities > 1% are displayed.)
Census	Total	Slovak	German	Hungarian	Other or unknown
1880	45,933	33,951 (76.58%)	8,988 (20.27%)	1,066 (2.40%)	330 (0.74%)
1890	49,979	37,954 (75.94%)	10,180 (20.37%)	1,358 (2.72%)	487 (0.97%)
1900	51,956	38,233 (73.59%)	11,039 (21.25%)	2,185 (4.21%)	499 (0.96%)
1910	55,703	38,432 (68.99%)	10,993 (19.74%)	5,560 (9.98%)	718 (1.29%)

Population by religion (Note: Only religious communities > 1% are displayed.)
Census	Total	Lutheran	Roman Catholic	Jewish	Other or unknown
1880	45,933	25,279 (55.03%)	18,413 (40.09%)	2,188 (4.76%)	53 (0.12%)
1890	49,979	26,834 (53.69%)	20,853 (41.72%)	2,214 (4.43%)	78 (0.16%)
1900	51,956	27,075 (52.11%)	22,677 (43.65%)	2,022 (3.89%)	182 (0.35%)
1910	55,703	27,651 (49.64%)	25,607 (45.97%)	1,981 (3.56%)	464 (0.83%)

== Subdivisions ==
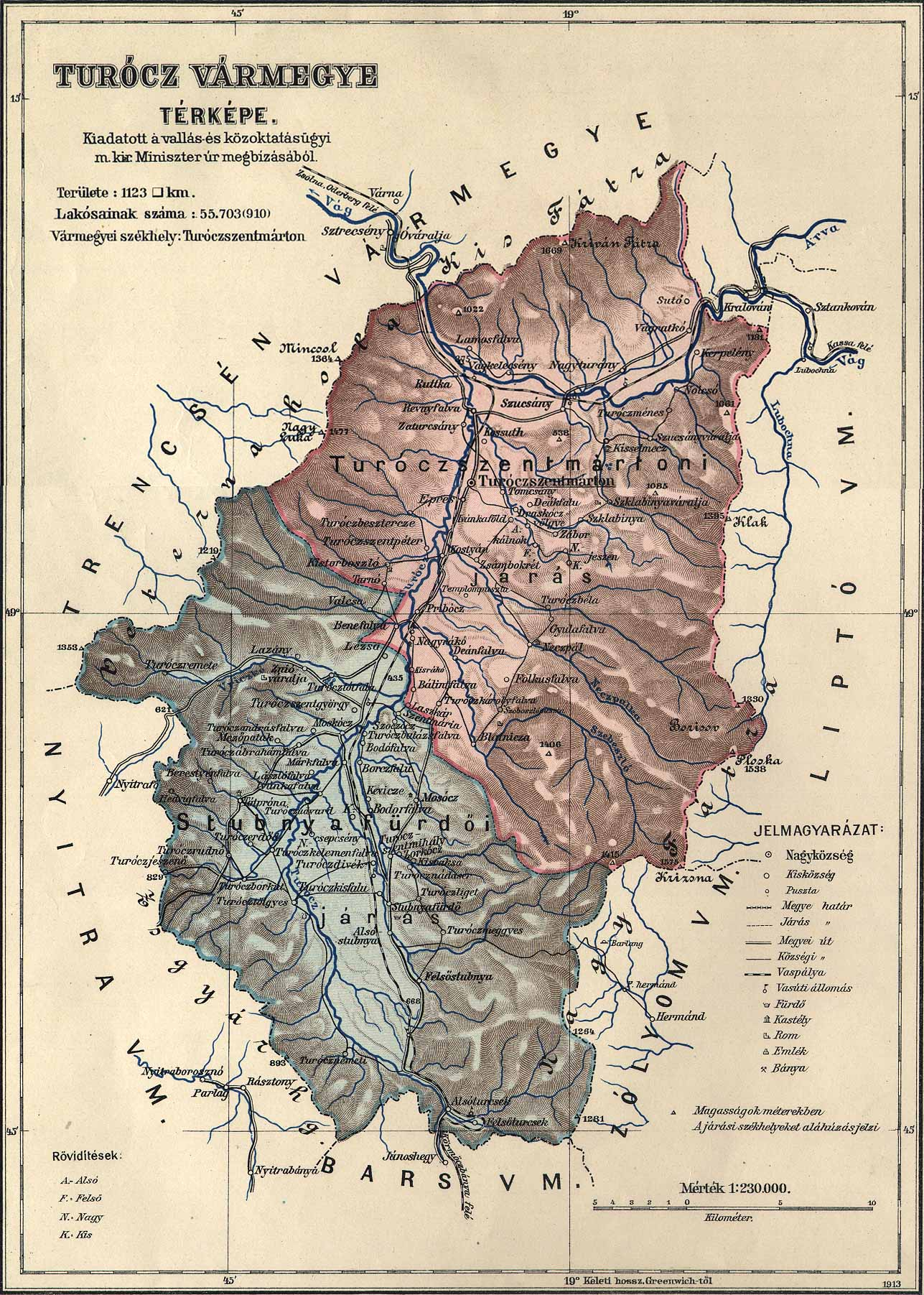

In the early 20th century, the subdivisions of Turóc county were:

- Lower Turóc – its center was Turócszentmárton and the subregion roughly corresponds to the present-day District of Martin
- Upper Turóc – its center was Stubnyafürdő and the subregion roughly corresponds to the present-day District of Turčianske Teplice

Districts (járás)
District	Capital
Stubnyafürdő	Stubnyafürdő (now Turčianske Teplice)
Turócszentmárton	Turócszentmárton (now Martin)

== Governors ==
- Michael Reway de Rewa, comes (fl. 1569).
- Franciscus Revay (fl. 1638).
- Andrea Czeromanka de Tarno.
- Petrus de Reva, comes (fl. 1767).
