= Kriváň =

Kriváň can refer to:

- Kriváň (peak), peak in the High Tatras, Slovakia
- Veľký Kriváň, the highest peak in Malá Fatra, Slovakia
- Kriváň (village), village in Slovakia in the Detva District

== See also ==
- Crivina (disambiguation) (Romanian toponym)
