= Šútovský vodopád =

Waterfall in Slovakia

Coordinates: 49.187°N 19.083°E

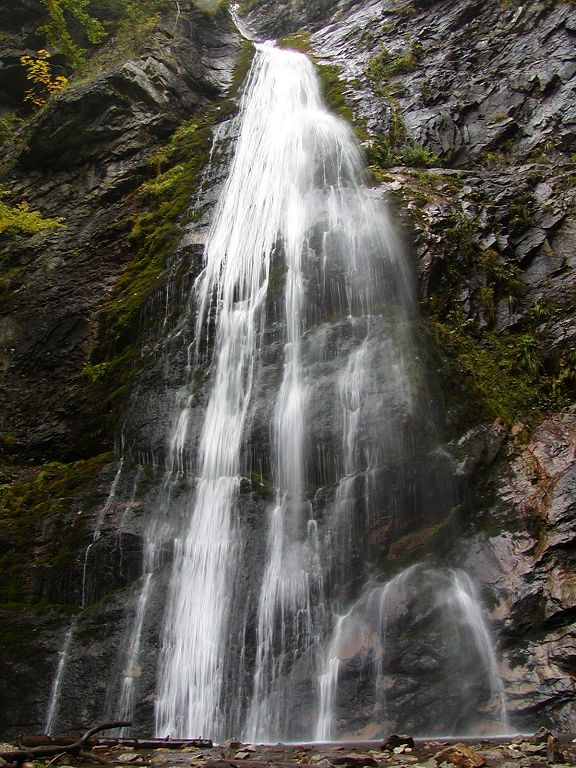
- Šútovský vodopád in Malá Fatra
- Location: Malá Fatra Mountains, near Šútovo, Žilina Region, Slovakia
- Type: Plunge
- Elevation: 830 m (2,720 ft)
- Total height: 38 m (125 ft)
- Number of drops: 1
- Total width: 2.5 m (8 ft 2 in)
- Watercourse: Šútovský stream

Šútovský vodopad is a waterfall in Slovakia located in the Malá Fatra mountains, 4 kilometres (2.5 mi) north of the town of Šútovo.

The waterfall is situated in Malá Fatra at an elevation of 830 meters, approximately 4 kilometers from the village of Šútovo. It has a height of 38 meters, making it the tallest waterfall in the area. It is fed by the Šútovský stream, which originates from the Mojžišove pramene rock formation about 1 kilometer upstream. The stream is around 2.5 meters wide above the waterfall.

== See also ==
- List of waterfalls
