= Malá Fatra National Park =

National park in Slovakia

Malá Fatra National Park Národný park Malá Fatra
- IUCN category II (national park)
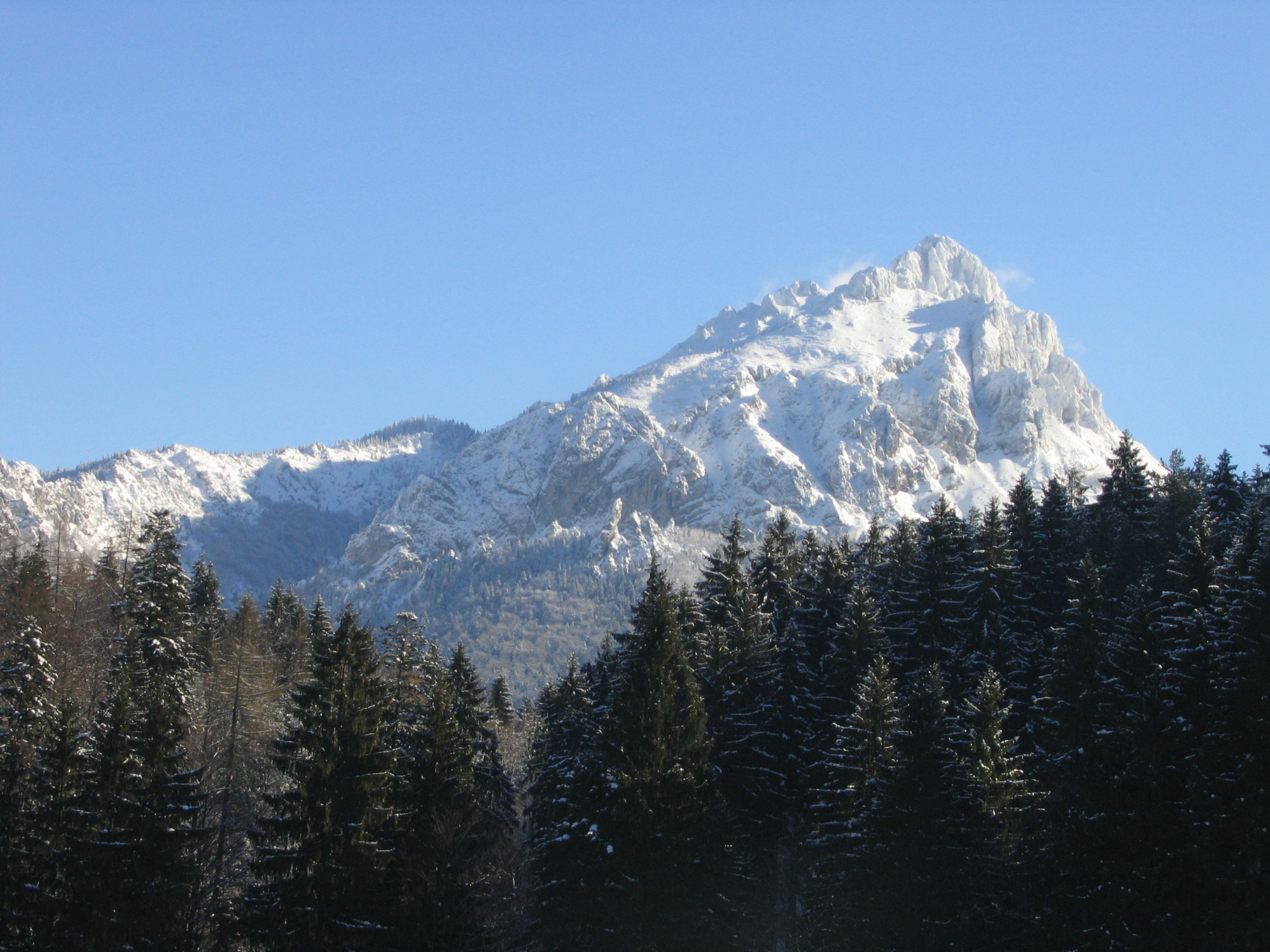
- Veľký Rozsutec (1,610 m)
- Interactive map of Malá Fatra National Park; Národný park Malá Fatra
- Location: West Slovakia
- Coordinates: 49.213969°N 19.080785°E
- Area: 226.3 km^{2} (87.4 sq mi)
- Established: 1 April 1988
- Governing body: Správa Národného parku Malá Fatra (Malá Fatra National Park administration)

The Malá Fatra National Park (Slovak: Národný park Malá Fatra) is a national park in the northern part of the Malá Fatra mountains called Krivánska Malá Fatra.

It has an area of 226.3 km^{2} (87.37 mi^{2}) and a 232.62 km^{2} (89.81 mi^{2}) buffer zone. The park was declared in 1988. Between 1967 and 1988 it was a protected landscape area. Its highest peak is Veľký Kriváň, with an altitude of 1,708m amsl.

For a geological and geographical description see Malá Fatra.

== Flora ==
The mountain is covered mainly with mixed beech forests, at higher elevations with fir and spruce. Pine woods and meadows occur at higher altitudes. About 83% of the area is covered in forest.

In the variety and beauty of flora species, the following examples stand out as the most remarkable:

- gentian (Gentiana clusii)
- auricula (Primula auricula)
- Dianthus nitidus
- round-leaved sundew (Drosera rotundifolia)
- lady's slipper orchid (Cypripedium calceolus)

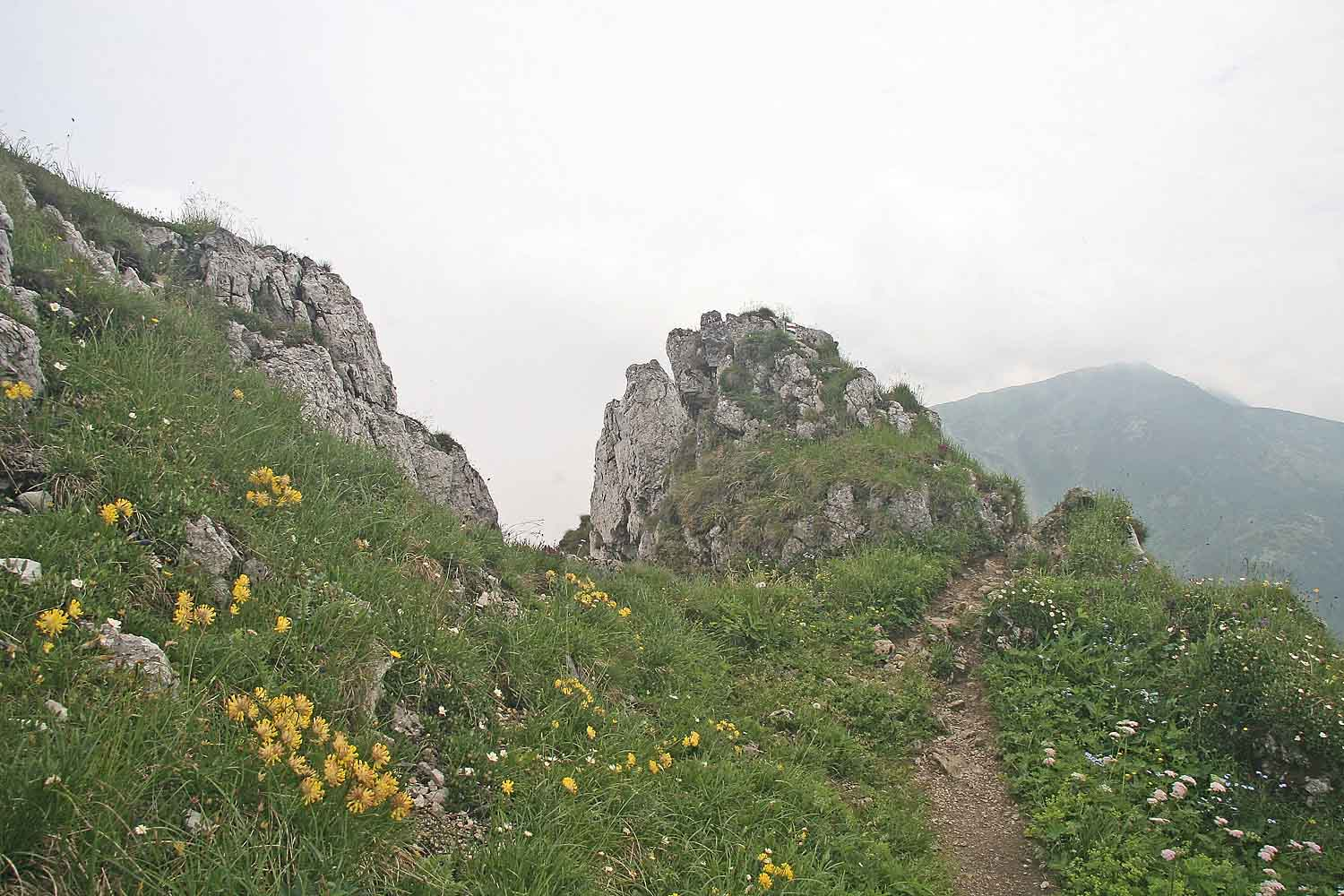
The summit of Malý Kriváň (1,671 m) in the foreground

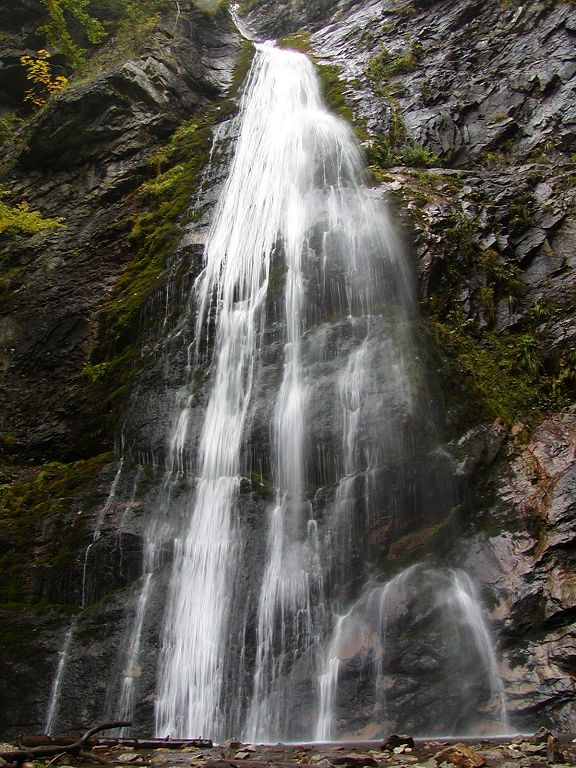
Šútovo Waterfall

== Fauna ==
The fauna includes:

- golden eagle (Aquila chrysaetos)
- eagle-owl (Bubo bubo)
- black stork (Ciconia nigra)
- brown bear (Ursus arctos)
- lynx (Lynx lynx)
- beech marten (Martes foina)
- European otter (Lutra lutra)
- wildcat (Felis silvestris)
- grey wolf (Canis lupus)

== Remarkable places ==
- Kryštálová jaskyňa (Crystal Cave) with calcite decoration, located in the Malý Rozsutec Mountain
- the 38 metres high Šútovo Waterfall
- castles, such as the Strečno Castle and Starhrad
- traditional architecture: Štefanová and Podšíp settlements
- Slovak folklore centres, such as the village of Terchová
- Jánošíkove diery (trans: Janosik holes) - system of gorges and canyons

== See also ==
- Protected areas of Slovakia
