= Veľký Rozsutec =

Mountain in Slovakia

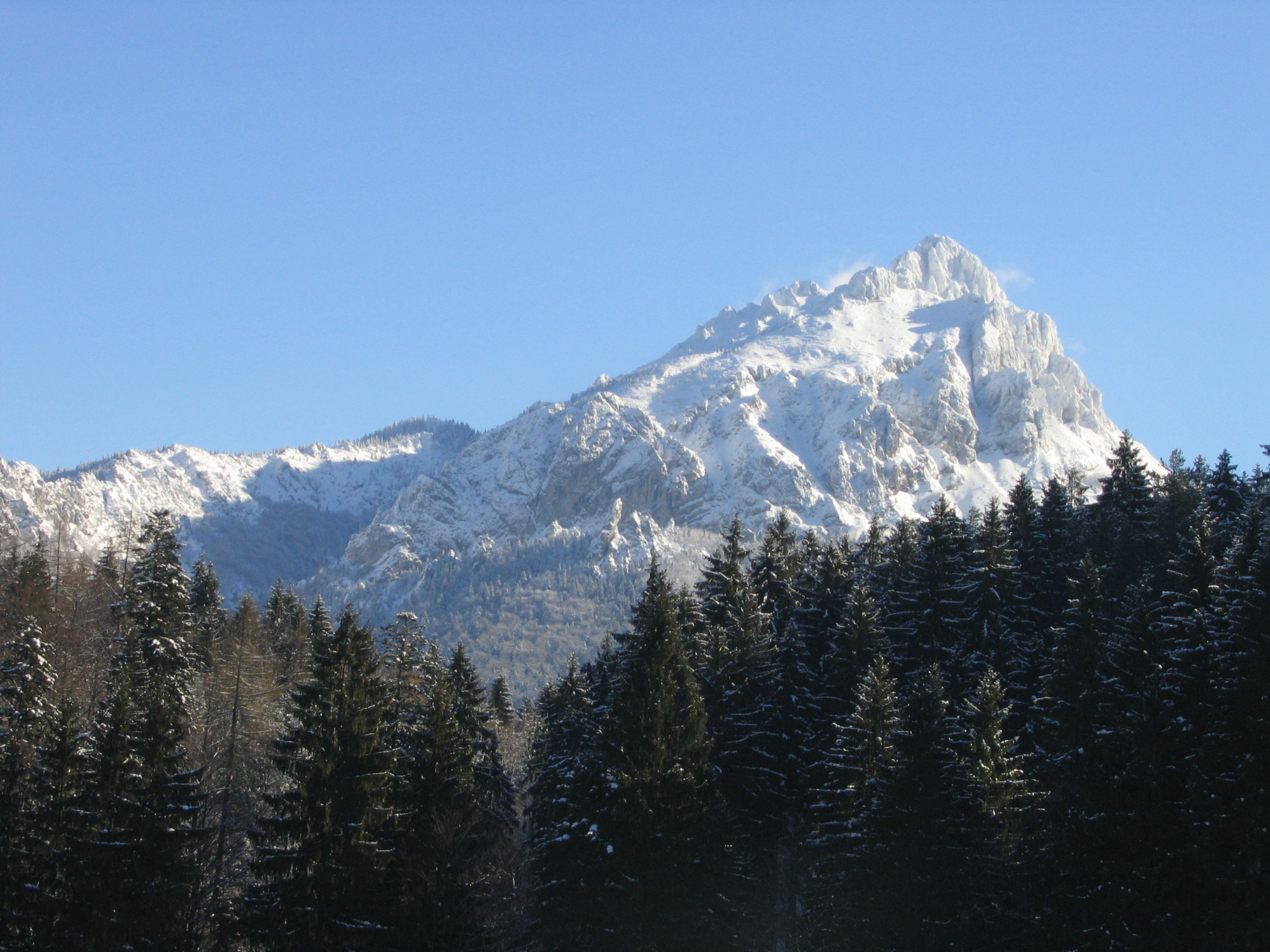
- Veľký Rozsutec as seen from the Poludňový Grúň (1,460 m) Mountain

Highest point
- Elevation: 1,609.7 m (5,281 ft)
- Coordinates: 49°13′52″N 19°06′00″E

Geography
- Location within Slovakia
- Location: Žilina Region, Slovakia
- Parent range: Malá Fatra

Climbing
- Easiest route: Start from the settlement of Štefanová (625 m), go through the pass of Medziholie (1,185 m) and follow the green trail (green blazes) to the summit. The ascent takes about two and a half hours.

Veľký Rozsutec (1,609.7 m; 5,281.17 ft AMSL) is a mountain situated in the Malá Fatra mountain range in the Žilina Region, Slovakia. The peak is situated in the north part of Malá Fatra called Krivánska Malá Fatra and is part of the Malá Fatra National Park and Rozsutec National Nature Reserve (since 1967).

Veľký Rozsutec and the surrounding area are home to many endangered species of plants and animals, some of which are endemic, as well as rare karst terrain.

== Photogallery ==
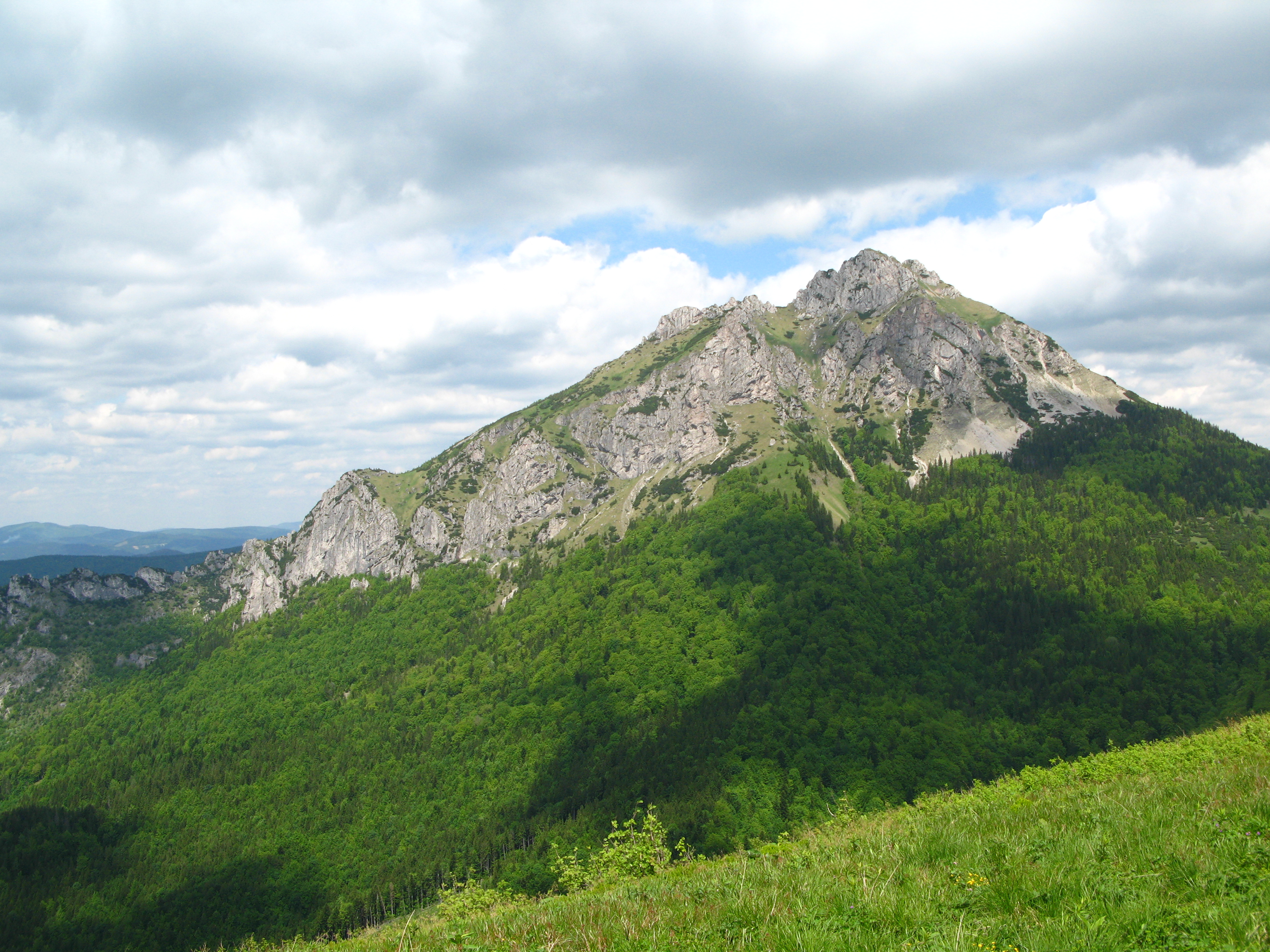
Veľký Rozsutec from Stoh hillside

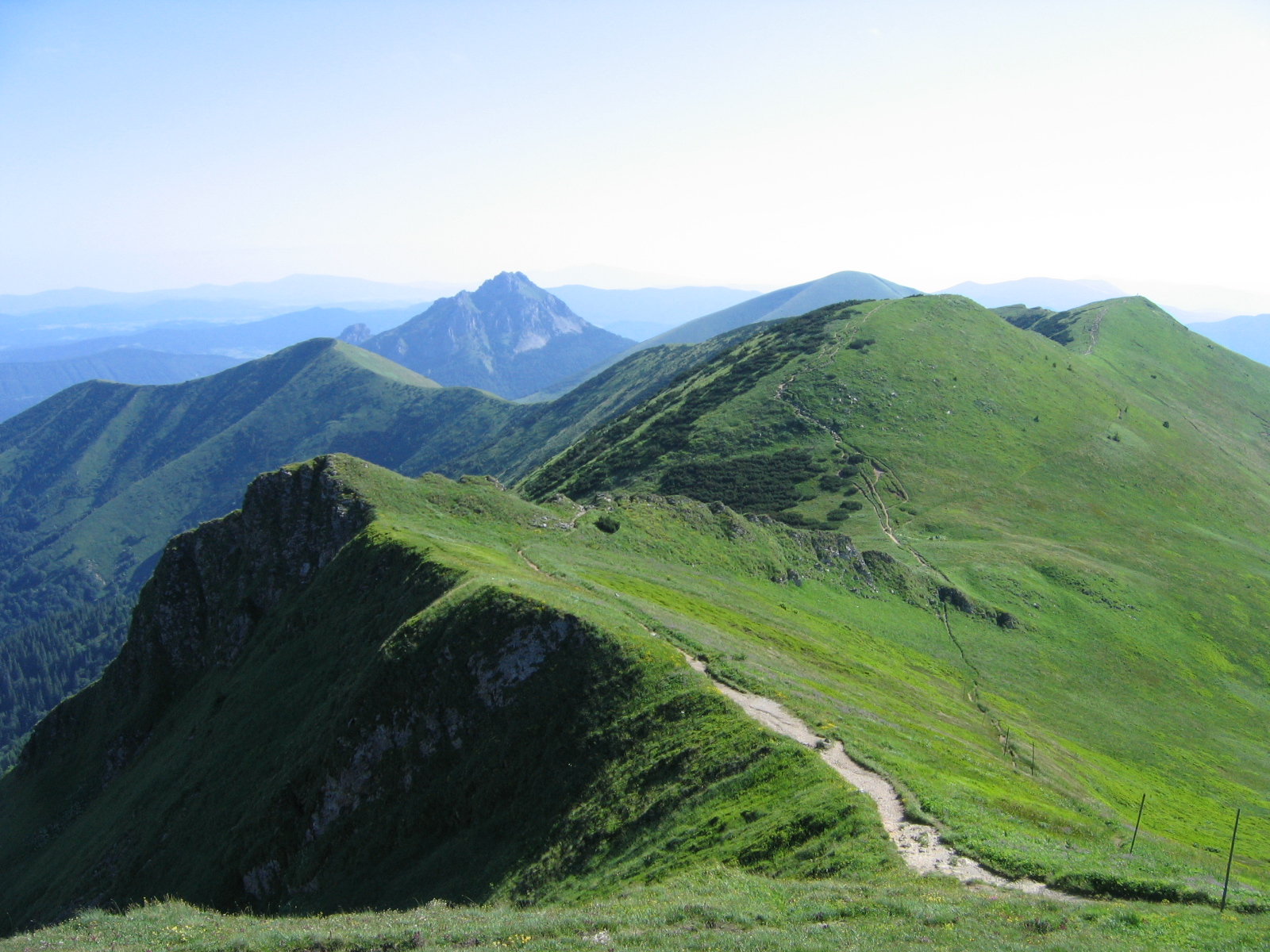
Crest of Malá Fatra with Veľký Rozsutec in the end

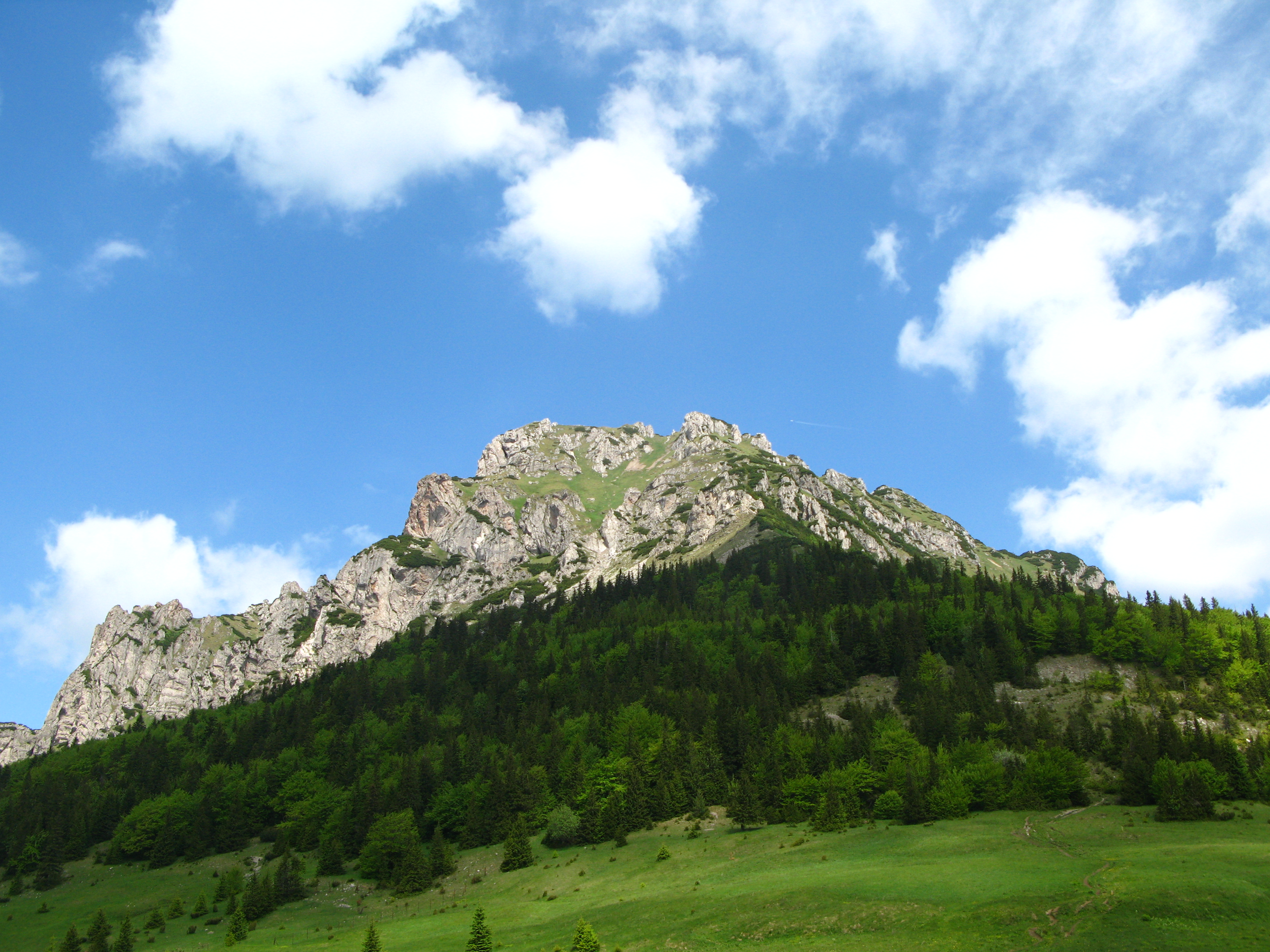
Veľký Rozsutec from Medziholie

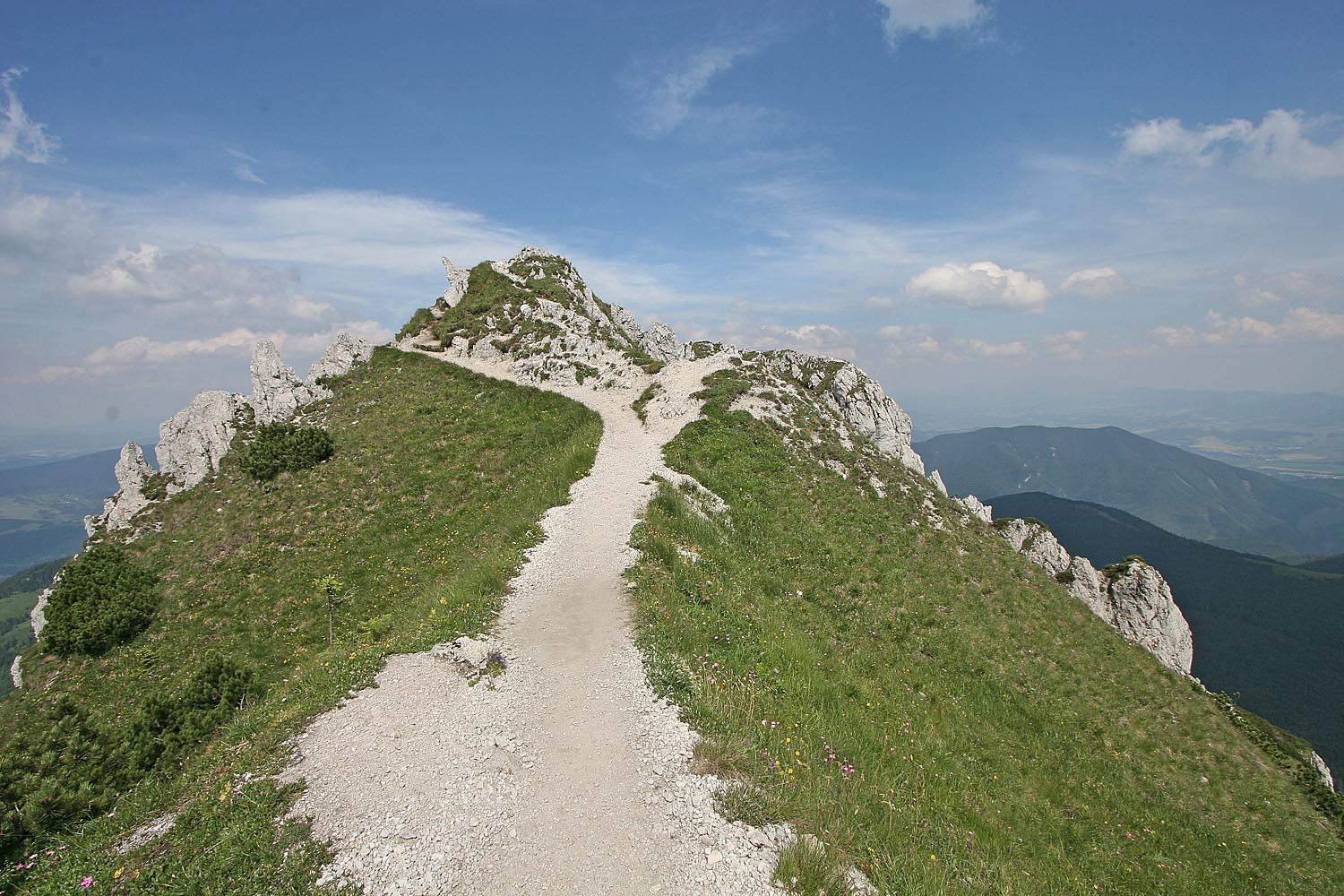
Peak of Veľký Rozsutec

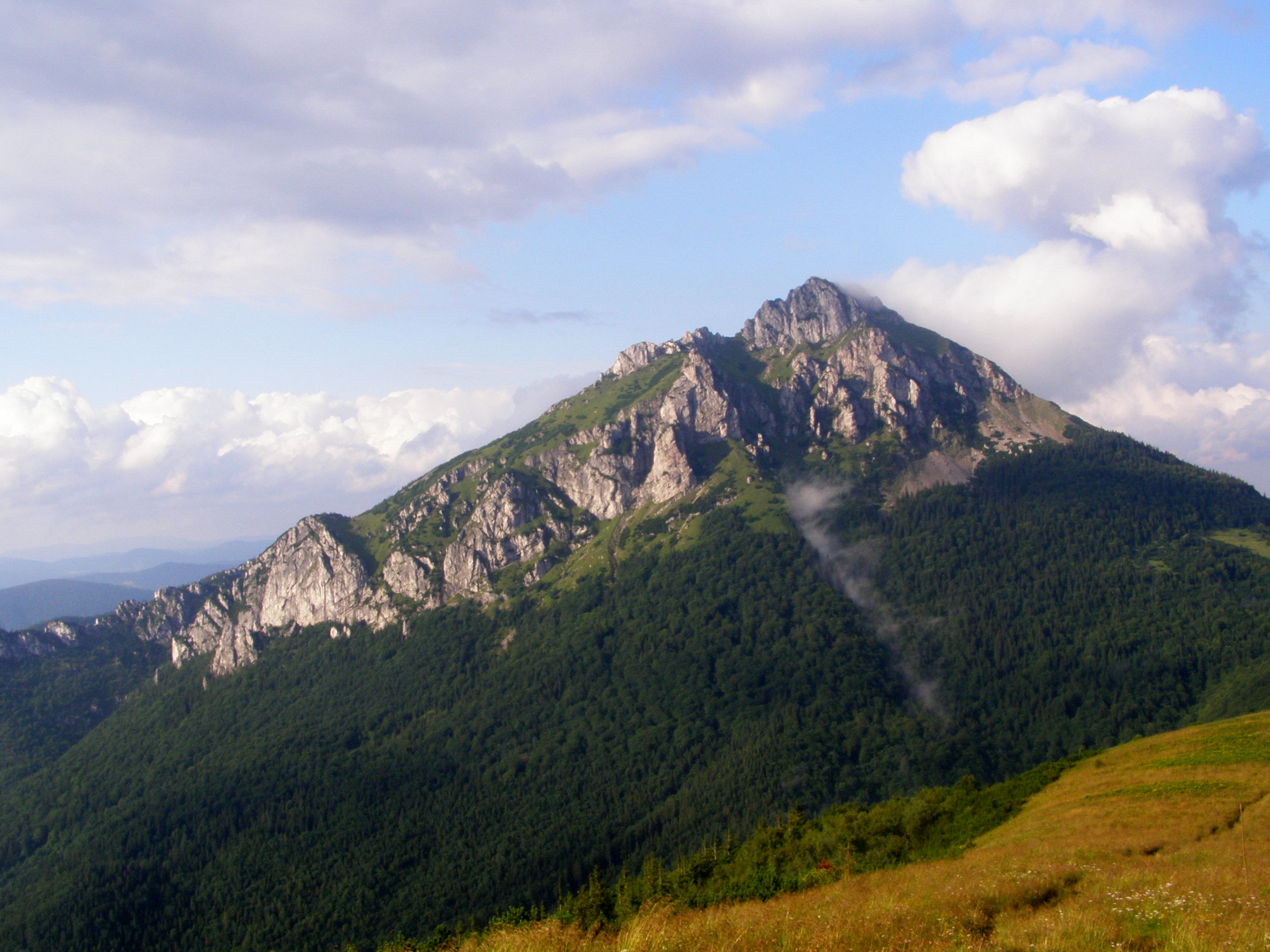
Veľký Rozsutec from Poludňový grúň
