= Sučany =

- Municipality
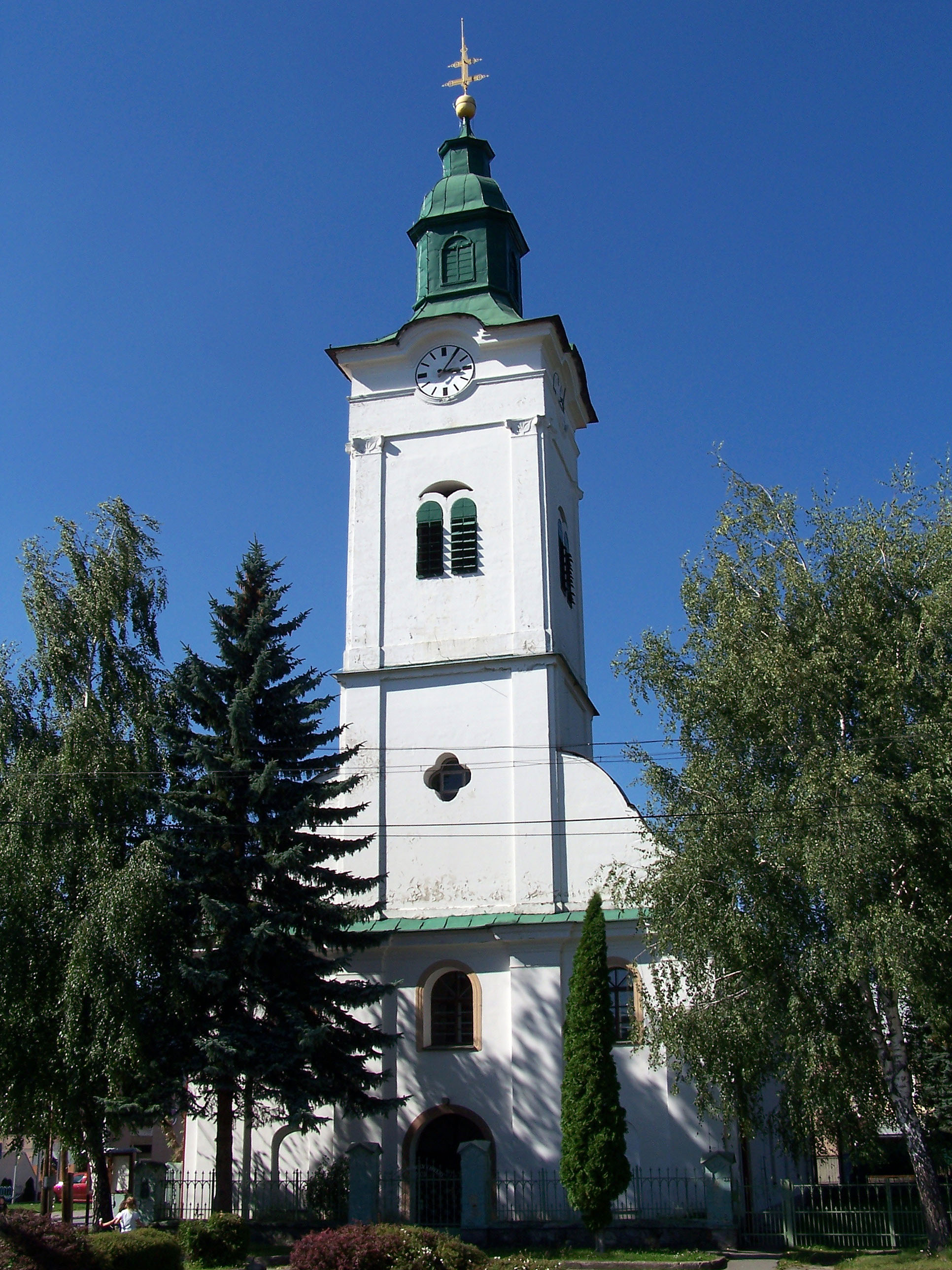

- Flag Coat of arms

- Location of Sučany in the Žilina Region Location of Sučany in Slovakia
- Coordinates: 49.10°N 18.99°E
- Country: Slovakia
- Region: Žilina Region
- District: Martin District
- First mentioned: 1258

Area
  - Total: 33.26 km^{2} (12.84 sq mi)
- Elevation: 392 m (1,286 ft)

Population (2025)
  - Total: 4,702
- Time zone: UTC+1 (CET)
  - Summer (DST): UTC+2 (CEST)
- Postal code: 385 2
- Area code: +421 43
- Vehicle registration plate (until 2022): MT
- Website: www.sucany.sk

Sučany (Hungarian: Szucsány, (til 1895) Szucsán) is a village and municipality in Martin District in the Žilina Region of northern Slovakia. It is located around 5 km northeast of Martin, in the Váh river valley.

== History ==
In historical records the village was first mentioned in 1258. Before the establishment of independent Czechoslovakia in 1918, it was part of Turóc County within the Kingdom of Hungary. From 1939 to 1945, it was part of the Slovak Republic.

== Geography ==
The municipality lies at an altitude of 392 metres (1,286 ft) and covers an area of 33.26 km^{2} (12.84 sq mi) (2025). 9 kilometres (5.6 mi) to the north is the 1,509.3-metre (4,952 ft) high peak of Stratenec, part of the Krivánska Malá Fatra mountain range.

== Population ==
Population statistic (10 years)
Year	1995	2005	2015	2025
Count	4419	4659	4696	4702
Difference		+5.43%	+0.79%	+0.12%

Population statistic
Year	2024	2025
Count	4749	4702
Difference		−0.98%

It has a population of 4702 people (31 December 2025).

=== Ethnicity ===
Census 2021 (1+ %)
Ethnicity	Number	Fraction
Slovak	4486	95.22%
Not found out	200	4.24%
Romani	128	2.71%
Total	4711	

In year 2021 was 4711 people by ethnicity 4486 as Slovak, 200 as Not found out, 128 as Romani, 46 as Czech, 10 as German, 9 as Hungarian, 8 as Polish, 8 as Other, 6 as Italian, 4 as Romanian, 3 as Moravian, 2 as Rusyn, 2 as Russian, 2 as Croatian, 1 as Jewish, 1 as Vietnamese, 1 as Greek, 1 as French and 1 as English.

Note on population: The difference values of population numbers in the table "Population statistic" and in the sections "Ethnicity" & "Religion" is caused by the use of various statistical methods.

=== Religion ===
Census 2021 (1+ %)
Religion	Number	Fraction
Roman Catholic Church	2057	43.66%
None	1309	27.79%
Evangelical Church	967	20.53%
Not found out	212	4.5%
Total	4711	

In year 2021 was 4711 people by religion 2057 from Roman Catholic Church, 1309 from None, 967 from Evangelical Church, 212 from Not found out, 38 from Other and not ascertained christian church, 28 from Greek Catholic Church, 22 from Christian Congregations in Slovakia, 17 from Other, 14 from Ad hoc movements, 8 from Apostolic Church, 6 from Paganism and natural spirituality, 6 from Church of the Brethren, 5 from Eastern Orthodox Church, 5 from United Methodist Church, 5 from Seventh-day Adventist Church, 4 from Calvinist Church, 3 from Buddhism, 2 from Jehovah's Witnesses, 1 from Old Catholic Church, 1 from Islam and 1 from Czechoslovak Hussite Church.

== Notable people ==
- Daniel Sinapius-Horčička (1640–1688), writer, poet and composer
- Milan Hodža (1878–1944), politician, statesman and publicist, Prime Minister of Czechoslovakia (1935–1938)
- Jozef Turanec (1892–1957), General of the Slovak Army during World War II

== Twin towns – sister cities ==
Sučany is twinned with:

- Fulnek, Czech Republic

== Gallery ==
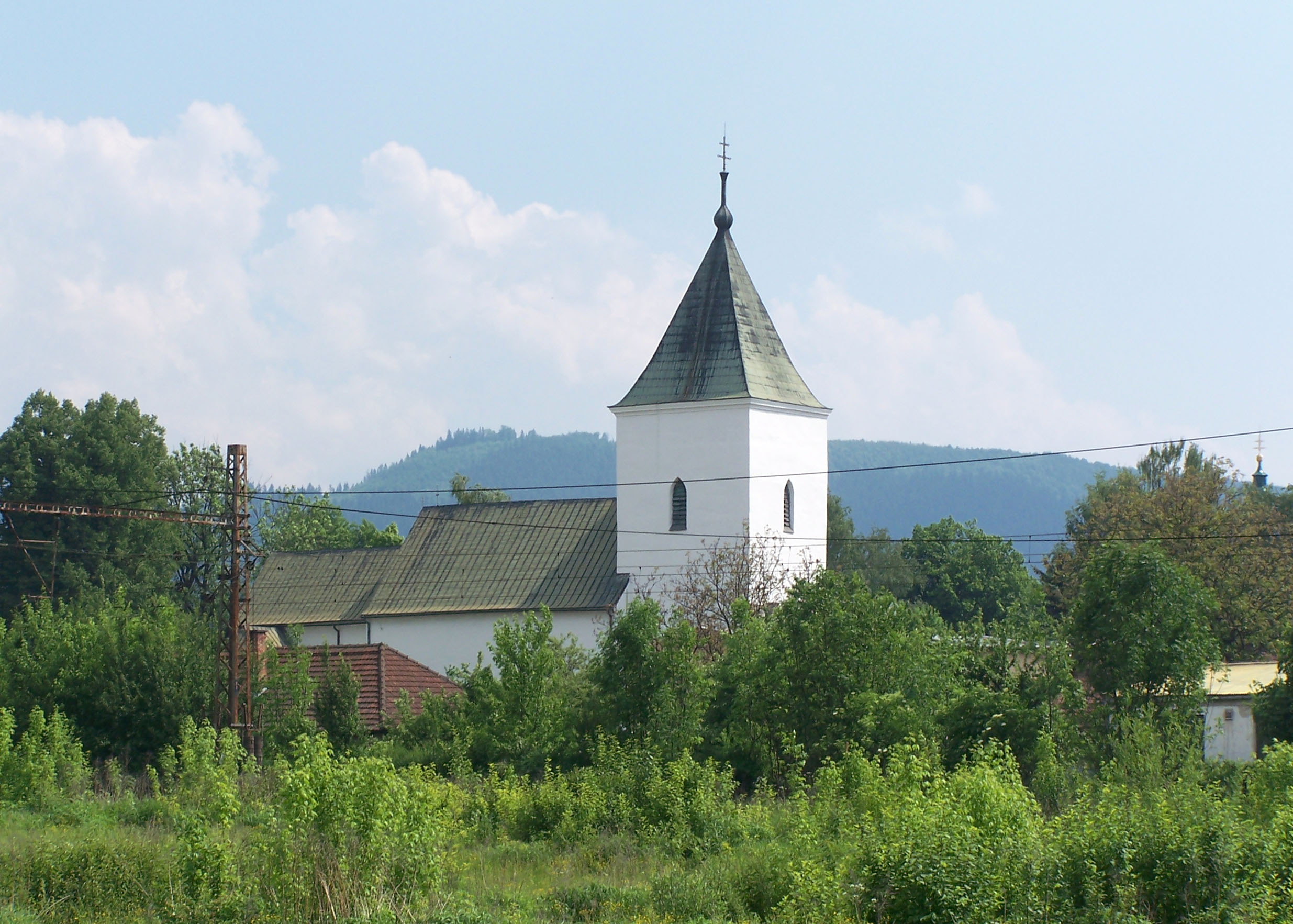
Assumption of Virgin Mary Church

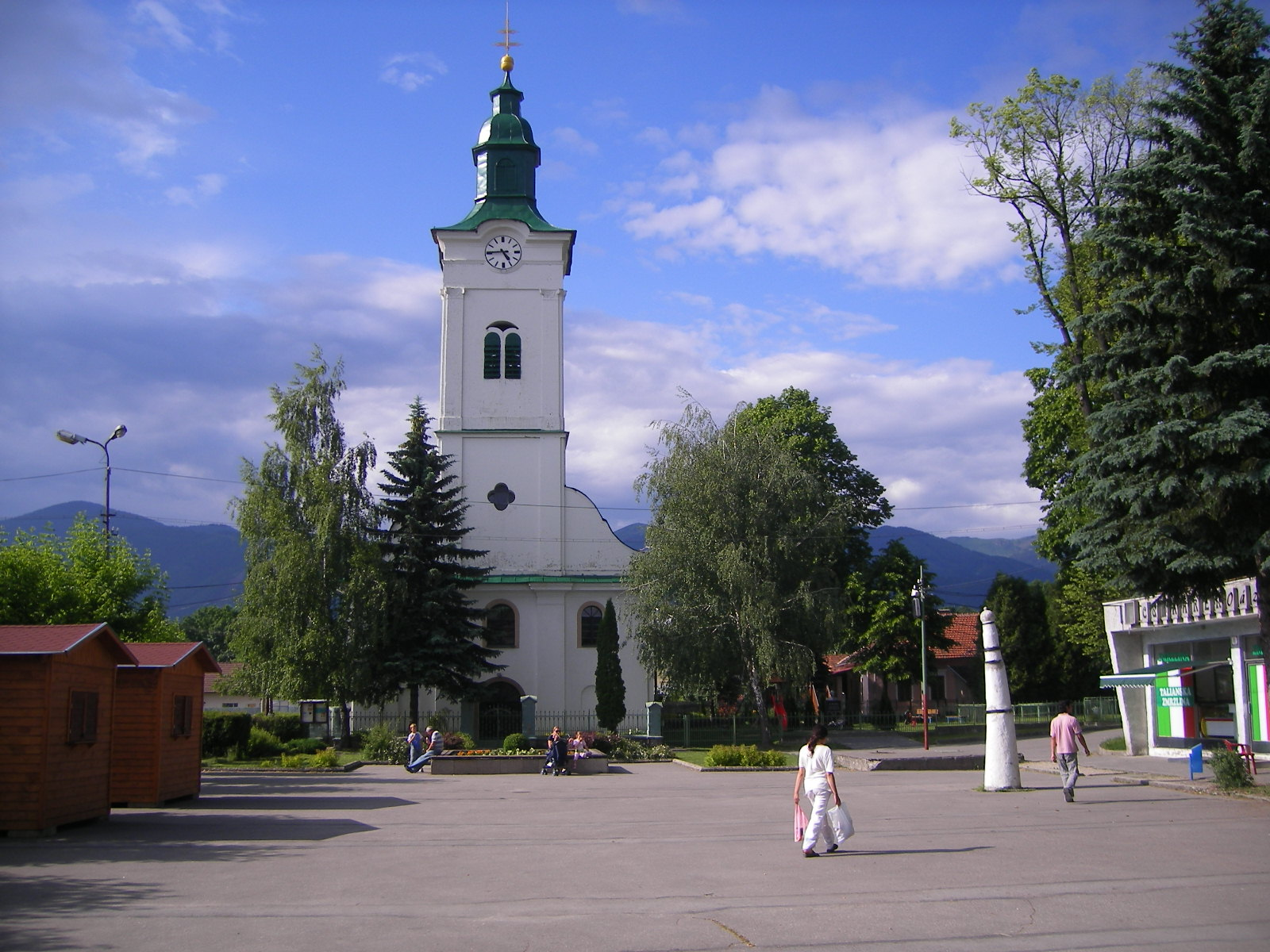
Protestant church

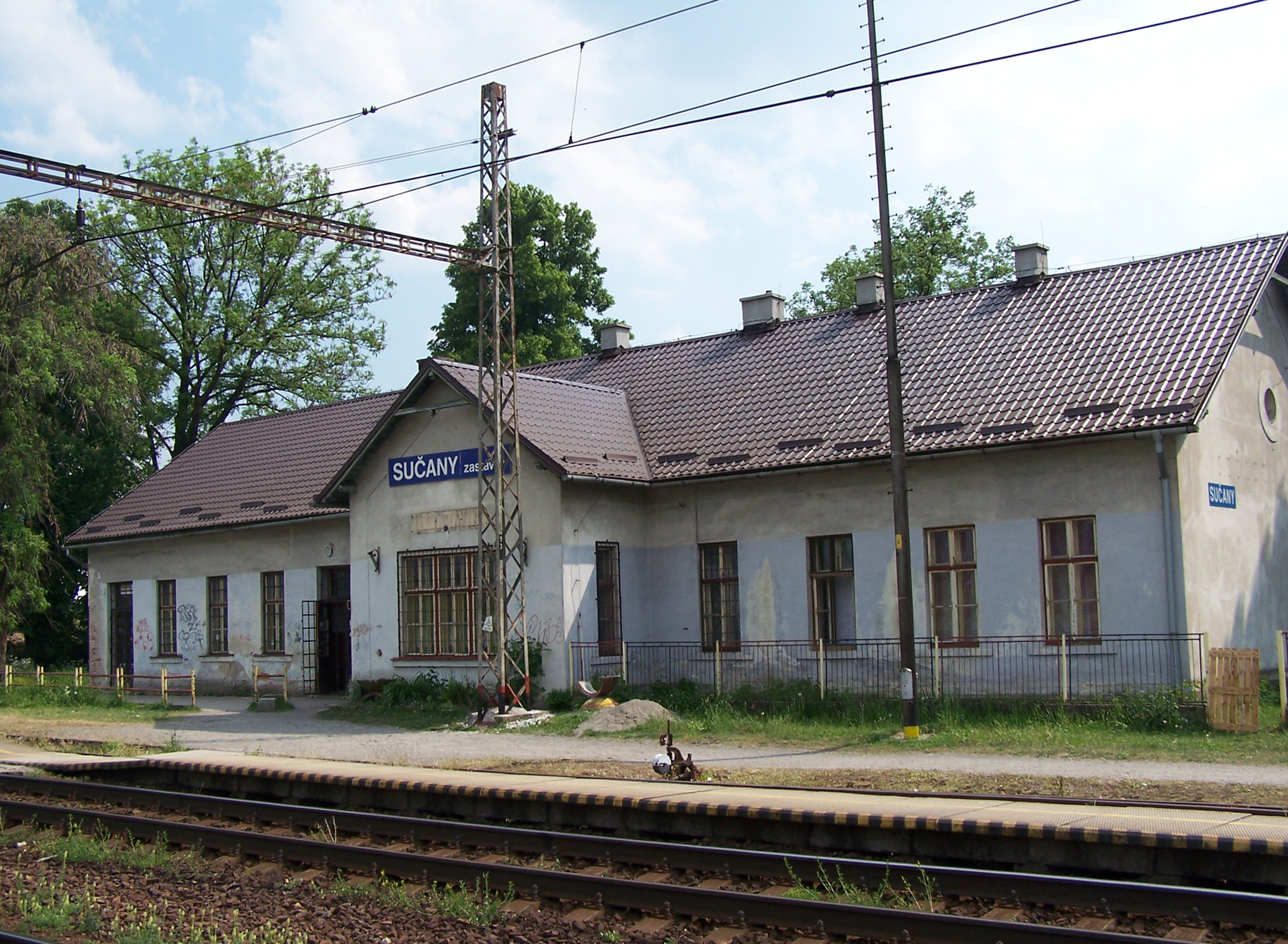
Train station

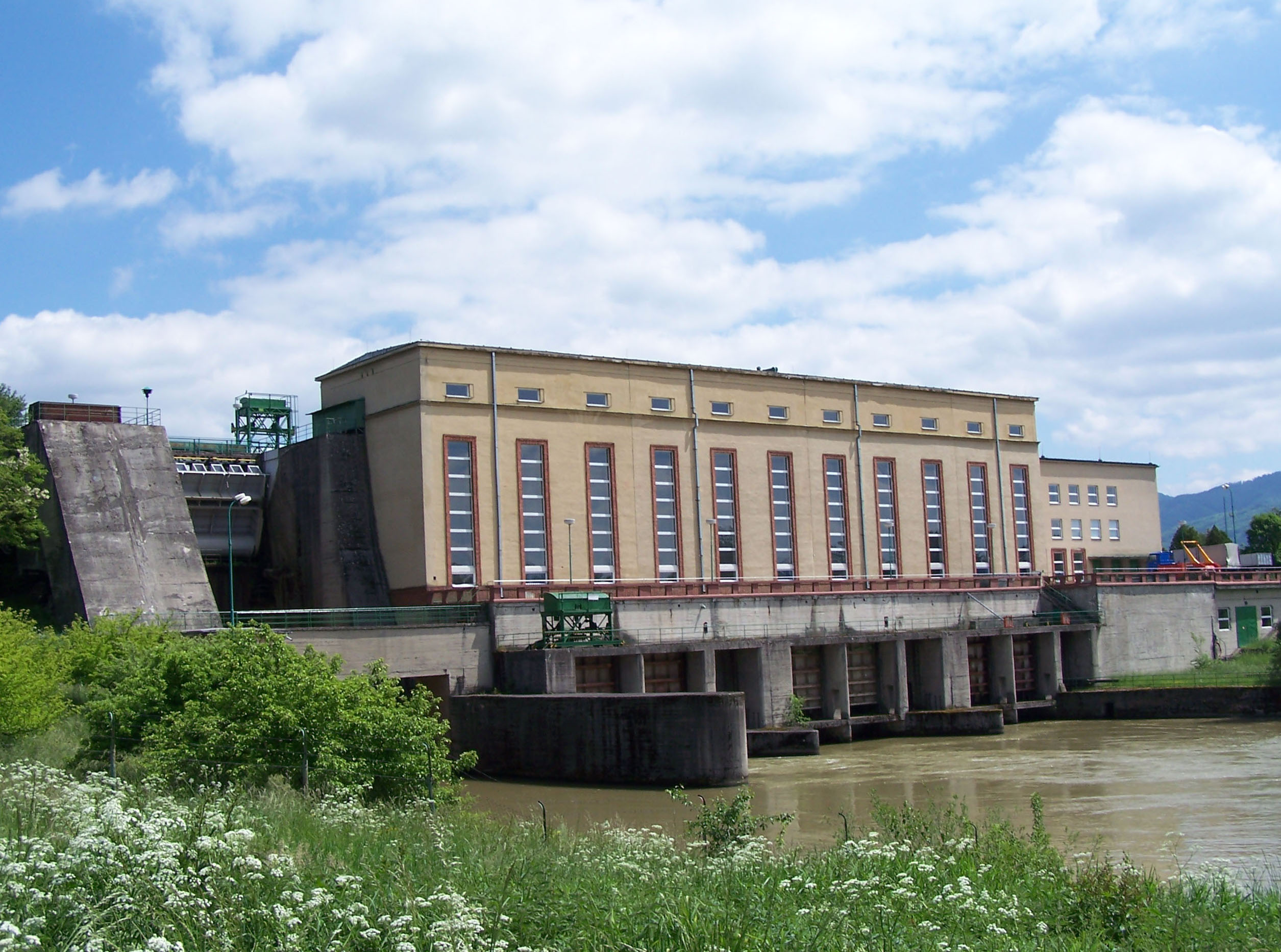
Hydroelectric power plant
