= Daniel Sinapius-Horčička =

- Born: August 3, 1640; Sučany, Upper Hungary
- Died: January 27, 1688 (aged 47); Levoča, Upper Hungary
- Occupations: Dramatist, poet, composer and preacher
- Movement: Baroque

Daniel Sinapius-Horčička (August 3, 1640 – January 27, 1688) was a Slovak baroque writer, poet, dramatist, composer of hymns and evangelical Protestant preacher who lived during the mid 17th century in what is modern Slovakia.

== Life ==
Daniel Sinapius-Horčička was born on August 3, 1640, in the village of Sučany, in the present day Martin District of the Žilina Region of northern Slovakia, though at the time the village was part of Upper Hungary in the Kingdom of Hungary. He was born into a family of preachers and after studies in Levoča and Wittenberg, Germany he worked as a preacher and rector of, successively, Jelšava, Kameňanoch, Liptovská Teplička and finally Radvaň. In 1673, during the persecution of Protestants, Sinapius-Horčička was exiled from Hungarian lands. He travelled with his family first to Silesia and then to Nového Bojanova, both of which fell outside of Hungarian jurisdiction but still within the realm of the Habsburgs. After returning from exile in 1683, he worked briefly in Radvan before moving on to Levoča. While in Levoča, Sinapius-Horčička served as a rector, evangelical priest, school inspector, and editor and proofreader of books published in Slovak. Sinapius-Horčička died on January 27, 1688, in Levoča aged 47.

== Work ==
Daniel Sinapius-Horčička was involved in the writing of Latin poems and school dramas. However, a large part of his work was devoted to religious baroque prose, proverbs and select Slovak spiritual poetry. Despite devoting much effort to his Latin works, his Slovak ones have maintained and sustained his reputation more into the modern era. His prose is considered to reflect that national consciousness- lauding the Slovak language and criticizing the lack of patriotism among his fellow Slovaks. He touches on the antiquity of the Slovak nation and on Slovak youth. What is very noteworthy in addition to these proto-nationalistic verses, Sinapius-Horčička wrote exclusively in Slovak when many of his Slovak contemporaries were using the more common Slavic literary language of Czech.

== List of Works ==
(Titles in Slovak)

- 1660 – Plesanie neba a zeme (Plausus poli et soli)
- 1676 – Zahradka dušičky pobožné (Hortulus animae piae), prayer books
- 1678 – Nový trh latinsko-slovenský (Neo-forum Latino-Slavonicum), 534 proverbs and sayings from the Bible along with others from the ancient and humanistic periods.
- 1679 – Osud verný vo svete duše (Sors fidelis in mundo animae)
- 1681 – Nestálosť vidiečanovej forúny (Fortunae inconstantia in rustico)
- 1681 – Trojnásobný bič božieho hnevu (Flagellum irae divinae triplex)
- 1682 – Pocta Bojanovu (Coelum Bojanoviense)
- 1683 – Perlička dítek božích, a Slovak catechism
- 1684 – Cithara sanctorum, contributed to the new edition, which appeared in many German translations. For example:
  - Těžká búrka již povstává
  - Smrt jest nestydatá obluda
  - O milá nevinnosť, jak si potupená
- 1685 – Orbis pictus
- 1686 – Hainov dom – zarmútený Nain (Domus Hain – moesta Nain)
- 1703 – Jádro všech modliteb v nemnohých slovích obsažené…, A posthumously published prayer book
