= Stratenec =

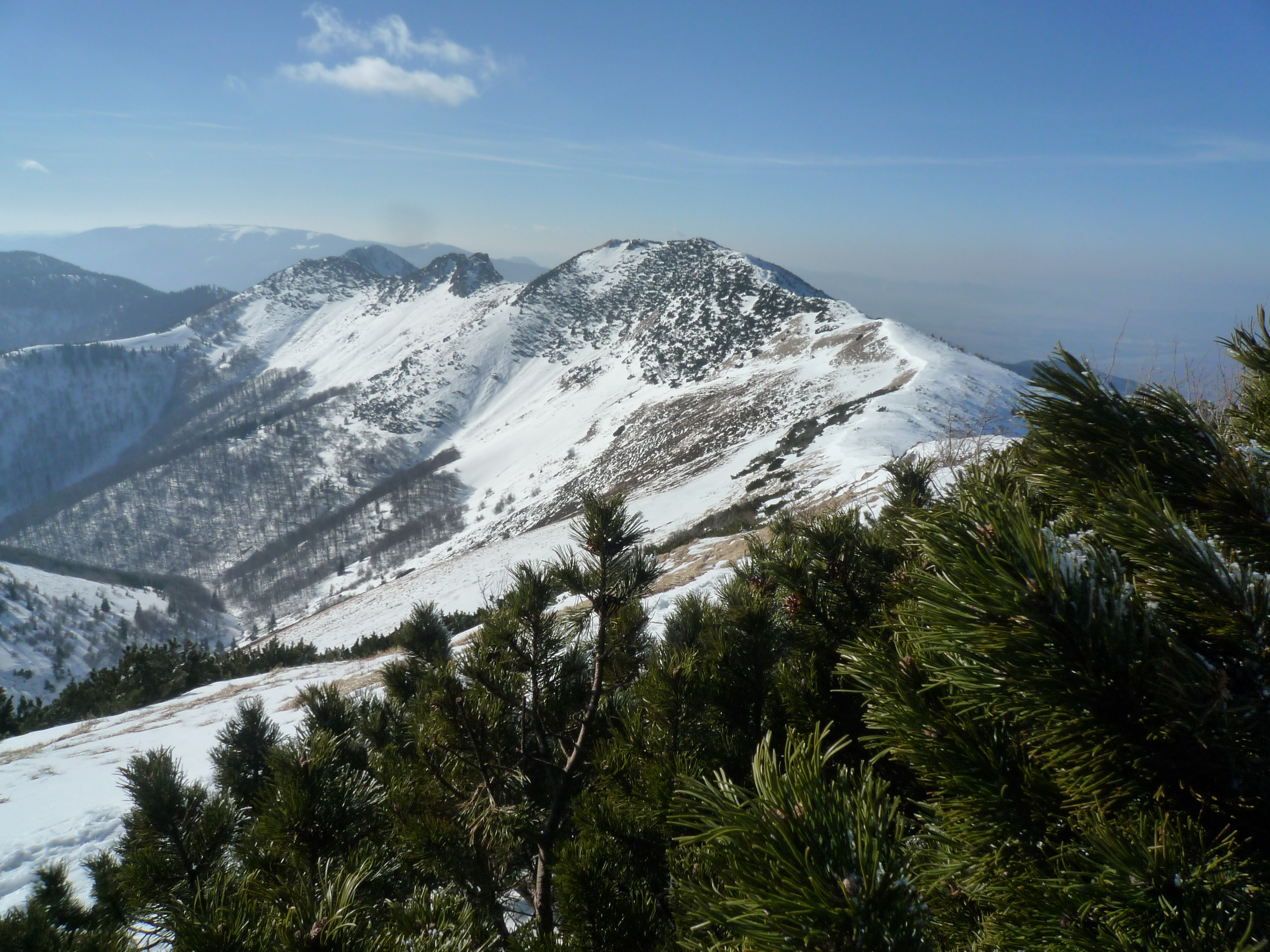

Highest point
- Elevation: 1,509.3 m (4,952 ft)
- Coordinates: 49°10′49″N 18°58′4″E

Geography
- Location within Slovakia
- Location: Slovakia
- Parent range: Malá Fatra

Stratenec is a 1,509.3-metre (4,952-foot) high mountain of the Lesser Fatra range in Slovakia.

This limestone mountain covered with dwarf-pines is situated in the west part of the main crest of Krivanska Mala Fatra mountain range.

It is accessible directly on the red marked trail between Maly Krivan and Biele skaly. From the mountain Maly Krivan it is divided by saddleback Priehyb and from Biele Skala by the saddleback Vrata.

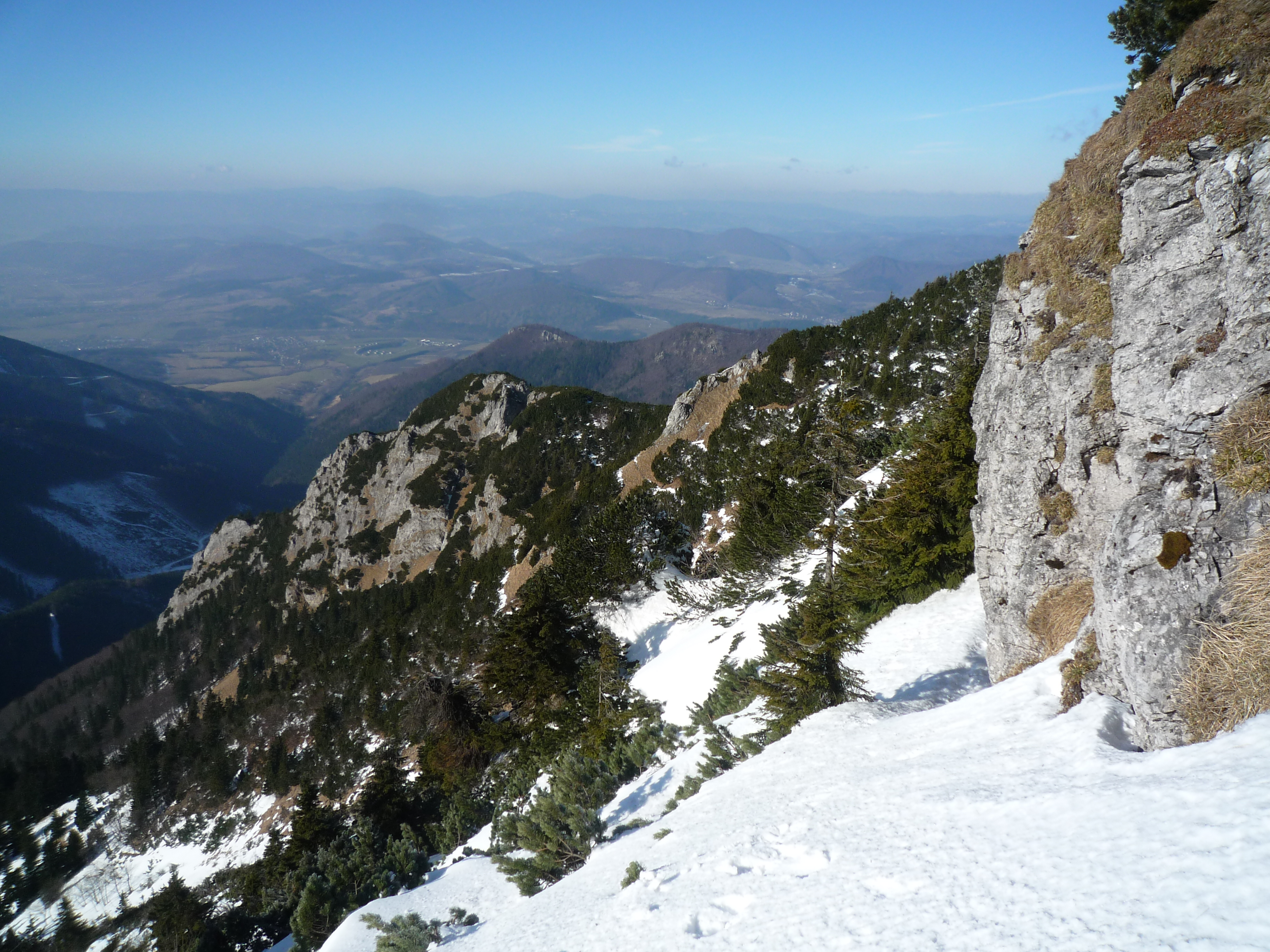
Rocky part of Stratenec - Valley Kúr

It can also be reached by the blue marked trail from Krasnany via the valley Kur. The northern rocky part of the hill hides 443 feet (135 m) long Old cave of Stratenec and 207 feet (63 m) long Kukurisova cave. There is also 115 feet (35 m) deep chasm. There is no marked trail to the rocky part and the access is restricted to the tourists. The area of the peak and the northern slopes are part of protected area Suchy.

The opposite southeastern slopes of Stratenec lead to the sucanska valley. Stratenec can be reached from that side by the yellow marked trail from Lipovec or by the green trail from Turcianske Klacany via Suchy. It stands 9 kilometres (5.6 mi) north of the village of Sučany.
