= Vrátna dolina =

Coordinates: 49°13′38″N 19°02′00″E

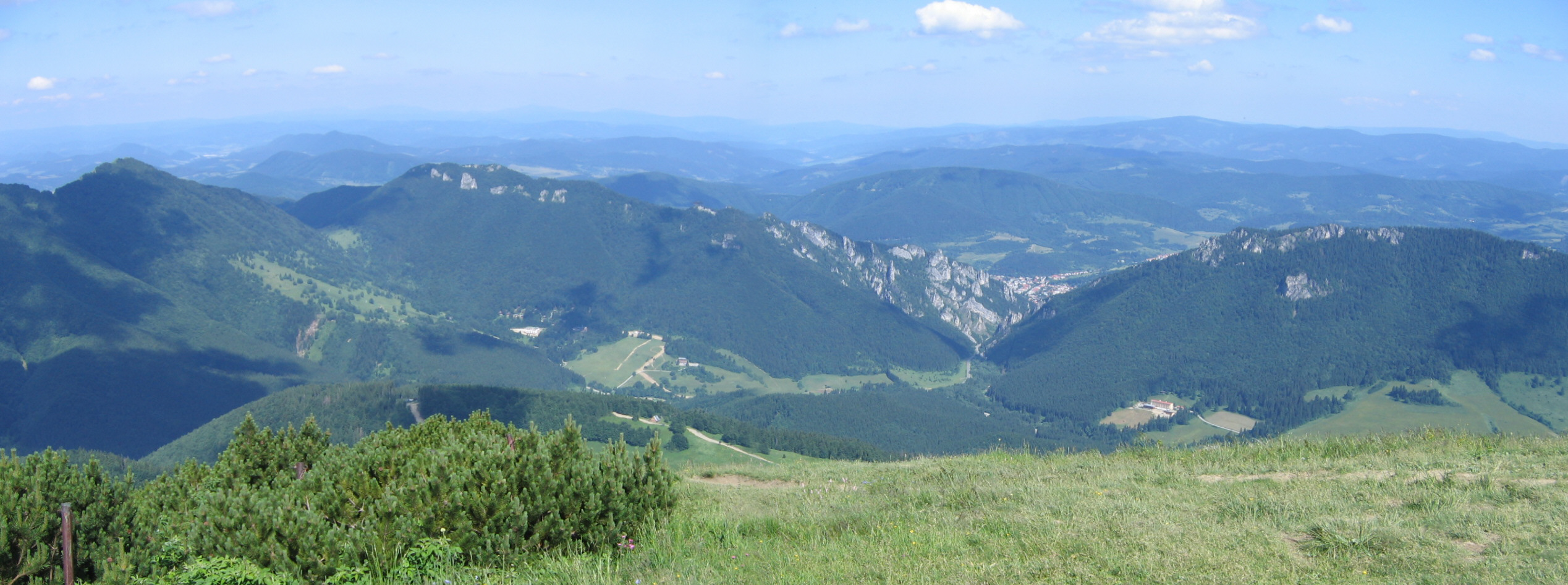
- Vrátna dolina (Vrátna Valley) as seen from the Poludňový Grúň (1,460 m) mountain
- Floor elevation: 600–1,550 m (1,970–5,090 ft)
- Area: 36 km^{2} (14 mi^{2})

Geography
- Location: Malá Fatra, Slovakia
- Interactive map of Vrátna dolina

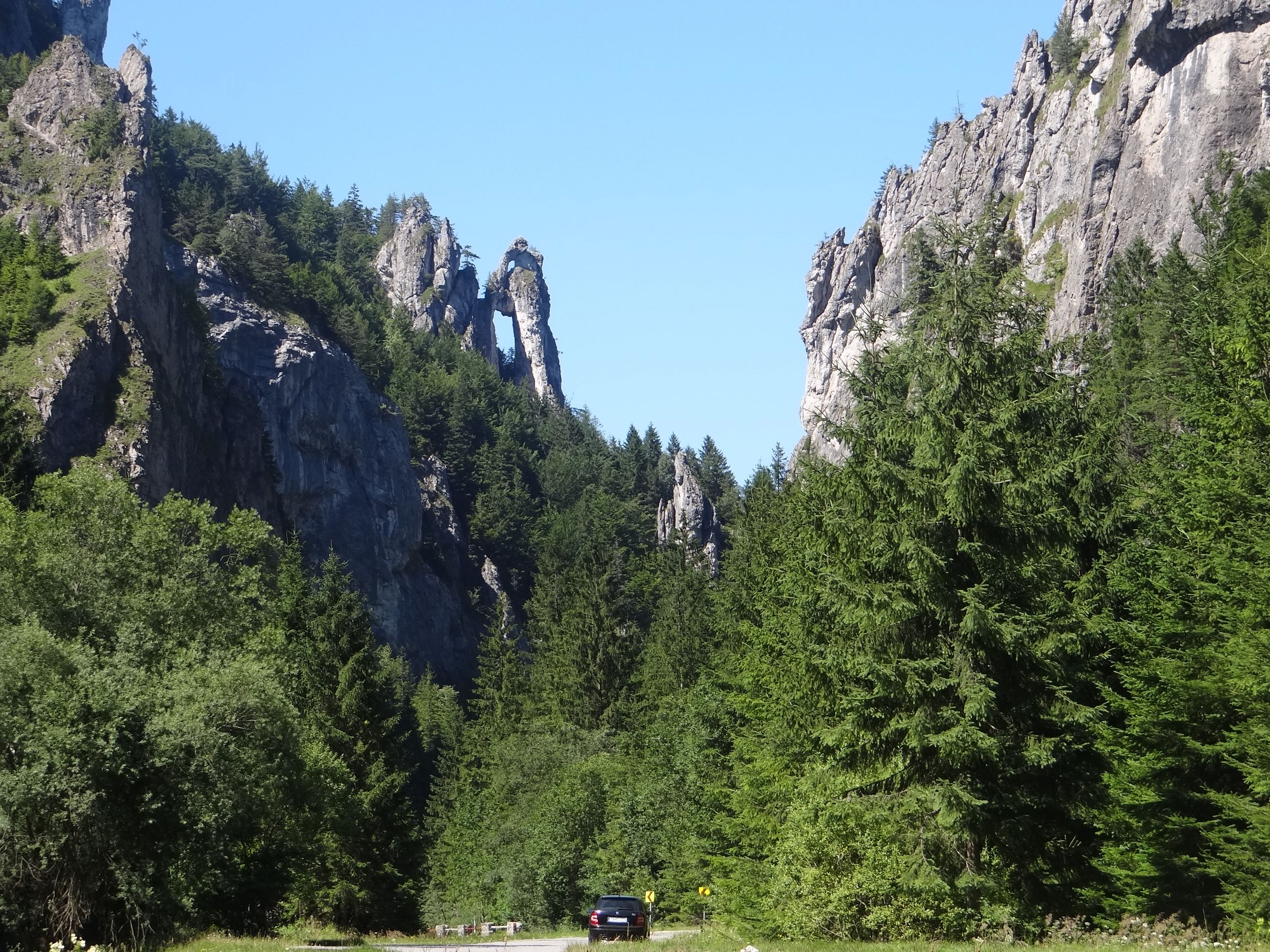
Vrátna dolina

Vrátna dolina or Vrátna Valley is a valley in the Malá Fatra mountain range in Slovakia. It is situated 3 kilometers from the village of Terchová in the Žilina Region. Vrátna dolina covers an area of approximately 36 km^{2} (13,9 mi^{2}). There are four access points into the valley: Tiesňavy, Stará dolina, Nová dolina, and Starý dvor.

== Tourism ==
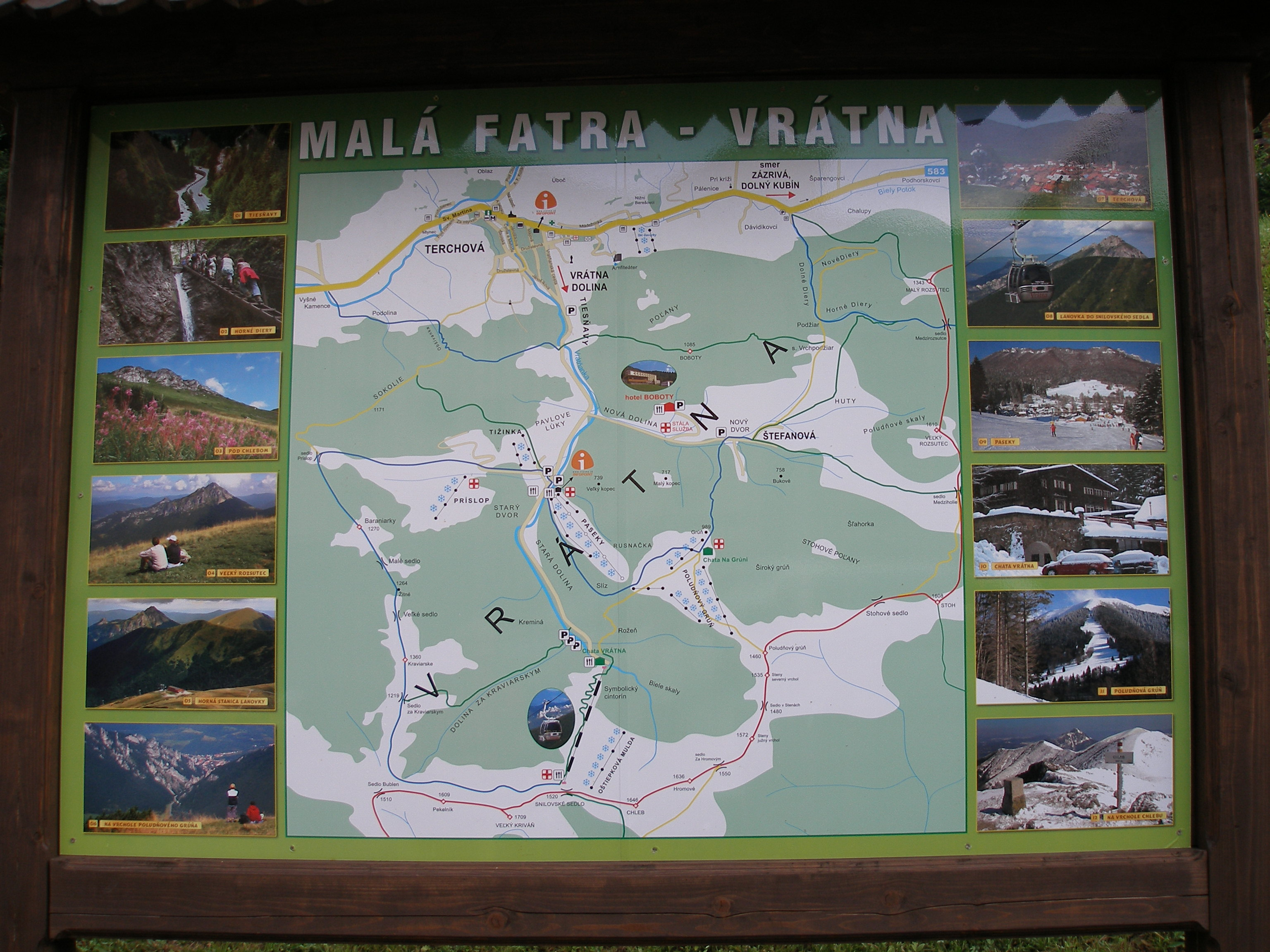
map

Vrátna is one of the most visited tourist and ski destinations in Slovakia. The ski resort Vrátna is situated at altitudes from 600 to 1,550 m AMSL and offers 16 slopes. Since 2006, Vrátna offers a cable car Vrátna (740 m) - Chleb (1,490 m), using 8-seat gondolas. It also offers cross-country skiing and other winter activities, and biking and hiking trails.
