= Malá Fatra =

Mountain range in Slovakia

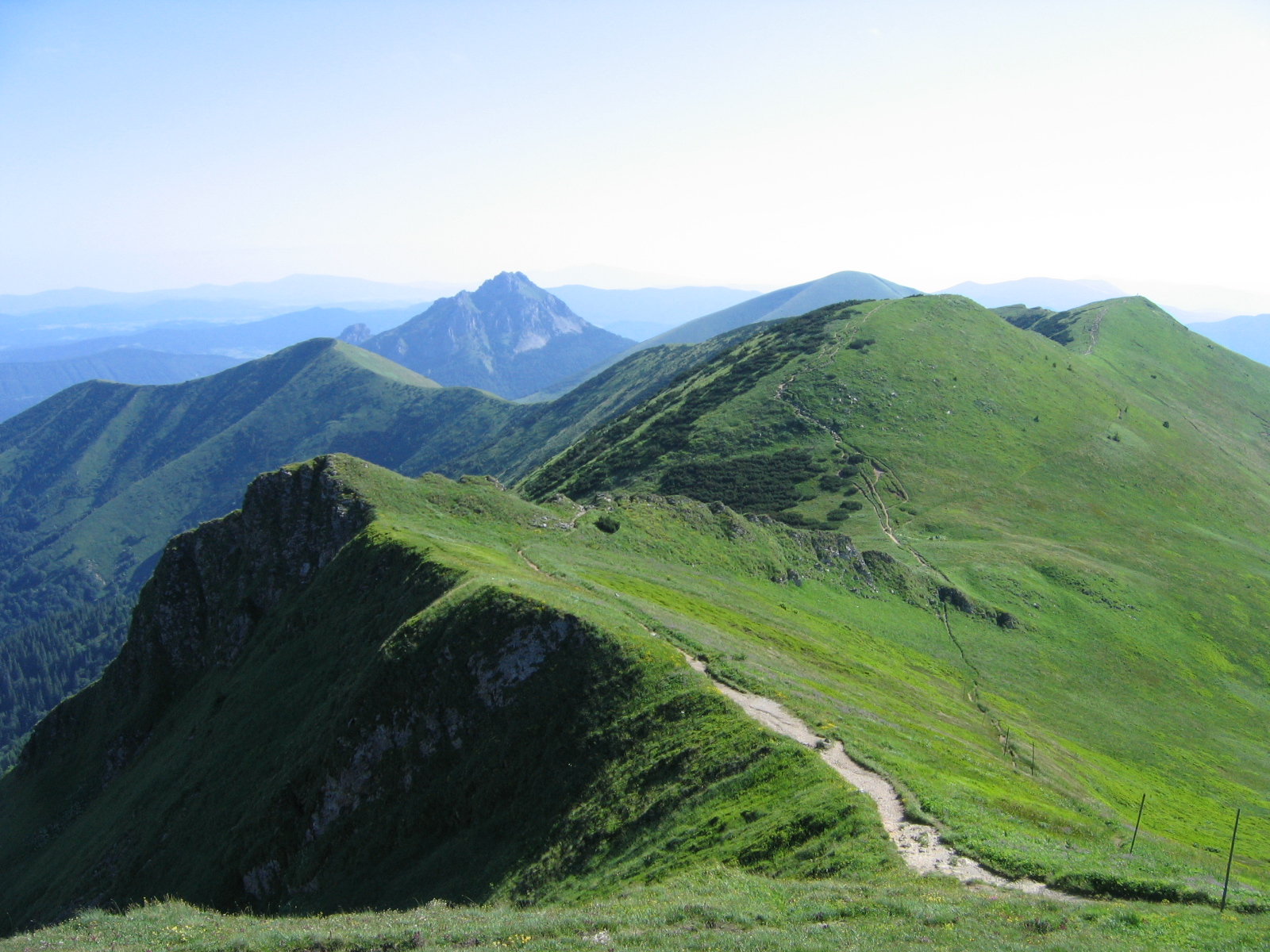
- The main ridge of the Kriváň part of Malá Fatra

Highest point
- Peak: Veľký Kriváň
- Elevation: 1,709 m (5,607 ft)
- Coordinates: 49°11′16″N 19°01′51″E

Geography
- Location within Slovakia
- Country: Slovakia
- Regions: Žilina and Trenčín
- Districts: Ružomberok, Turčianske Teplice and Žilina
- Subdivisions: Krivánska Malá Fatra and Lúčanská Malá Fatra
- Range coordinates: 49°10′N 19°00′E
- Parent range: Fatra-Tatra Area

Malá Fatra (Slovak pronunciation: [ˈmalaː ˈfatra]; also Little Fatra or Lesser Fatra, Polish: Mała Fatra, Hungarian: Kis-Fátra) is a mountain range in the Western Carpathians in the north-west of Central Slovakia. In the geomorphological system, it is a part of the Fatra-Tatra Area.

It is situated approximately halfway between the localities of Nitrianske Pravno, Strečno, Martin and Zázrivá. Turčianska kotlina (Turiec Basin) and the Oravská vrchovina mountains are situated to the west of the range, and Žilinská kotlina (Žilina Basin) and the Kysucká vrchovina mountains arw located to the east.

Malá Fatra consists of two subdivisions separated by the Váh river near Strečno: Lúčanská Malá Fatra and Krivánska Malá Fatra.

The highest peak is Veľký Kriváň at 1,709 m AMSL in Krivánska Malá Fatra.

Malá Fatra is basically one large karst feature. It is made up of crystalline rocks and complexes of Mesozoic strongly folded rocks.

The main peaks of Lúčanská Malá Fatra are Veľká Lúka (1,475 m), Kľak (1,351 m) and Minčol (1,364). The main peaks of the Krivánska Malá Fatra are Veľký Rozsutec (1,610 m), Malý Rozsutec (1,343 m), Veľký Kriváň (1,709 m) and Malý Kriváň (1,671 m).

The 12 km long pass between Krivánska Malá Fatra and Lúčanská Malá Fatra separated by the Váh is called Strečnianska tiesňava (Strečno Pass), located below the ruins of Strečno Castle. The Dierový potok stream created a complex of canyons, waterfalls and cascades in that area. Šútovo Waterfall (Šútovský vodopád ) is the highest waterfall in Malá Fatra and has a vertical drop of 38 m.

Popular centres for winter sports are Vrátna dolina and Štefanová. Other tourism centres are the villages of Terchová, where the Slovak national hero Juraj Jánošík was born and Zázrivá, where the traditional Slovak sheep cheese delicacy known as korbáčiky is made. One of the most popular ski areas in Slovakia outside the Tatras is the Martinské hole resort situated between the Veľká lúka Mountain and the town of Martin.

Krivánska Malá Fatra is protected by the Malá Fatra National Park.

In addition, Malá Fatra includes the following small-scale protection areas:

- national nature reserves: Chleb, Minčol, Krivé, Šútovská dolina, Sokolec, Suchý, Starý hrad, Prípor, Šíp, Šrámková, Rozsutec, Tiesňavy, Veľká Bránica, Kľačianska Magura
- nature reserves: Dubovské lúky, Goľove mláky, Hajasová, Hrabinka, Hrádok, Kraľoviansky meander, Močiar, Paráč, Pod Rígľom, Veľká Lučivná
- natural monuments: Bôrická mláka, Domašínsky meander, Krasniansky luh, Šútovská epigenéza
- protected site: Hate

== Gallery ==
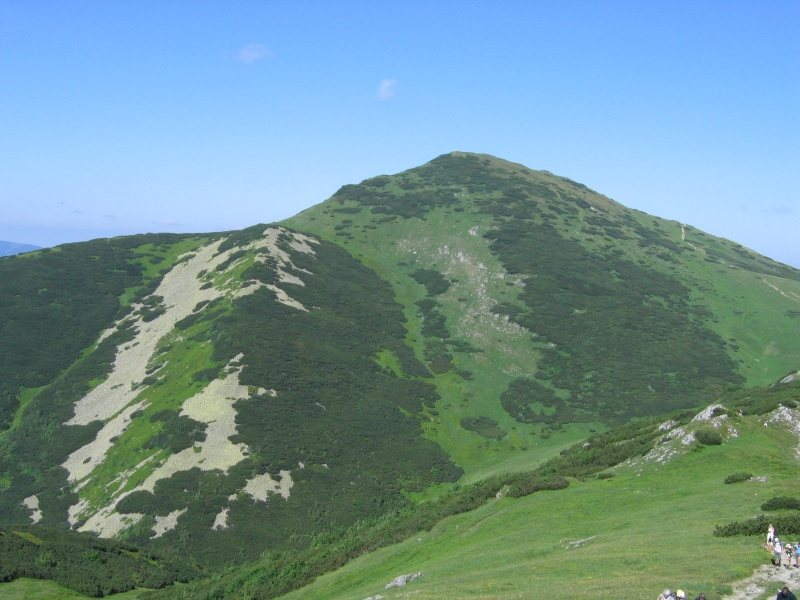
Veľký Kriváň, the highest mountain of the range

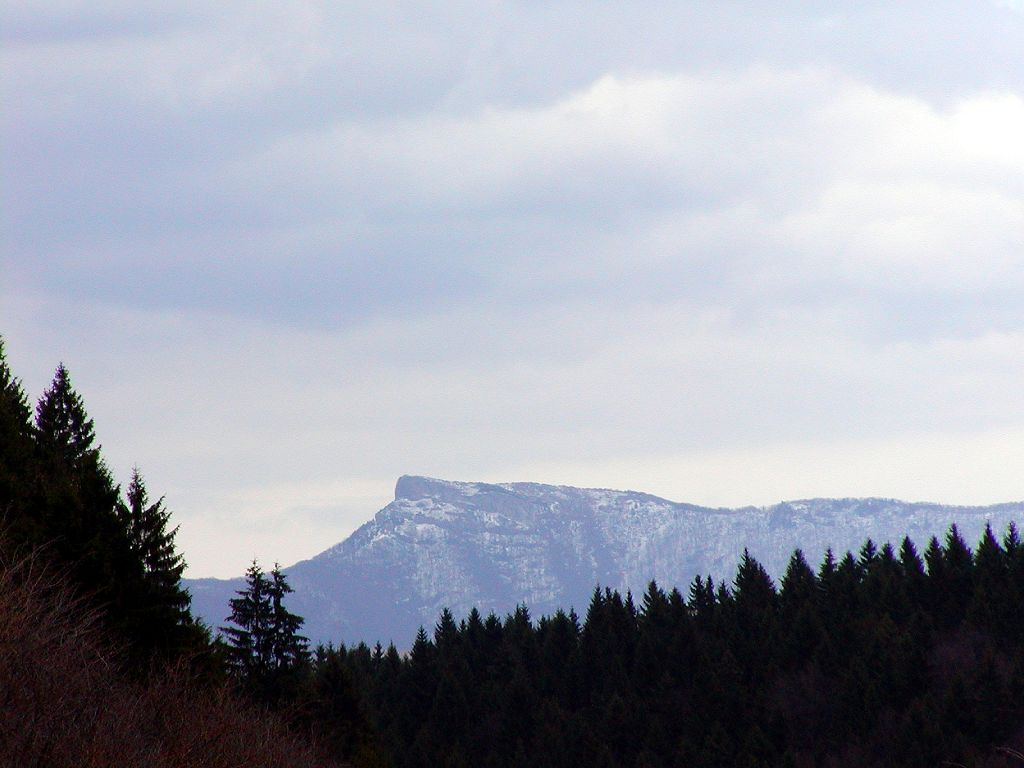
Kľak

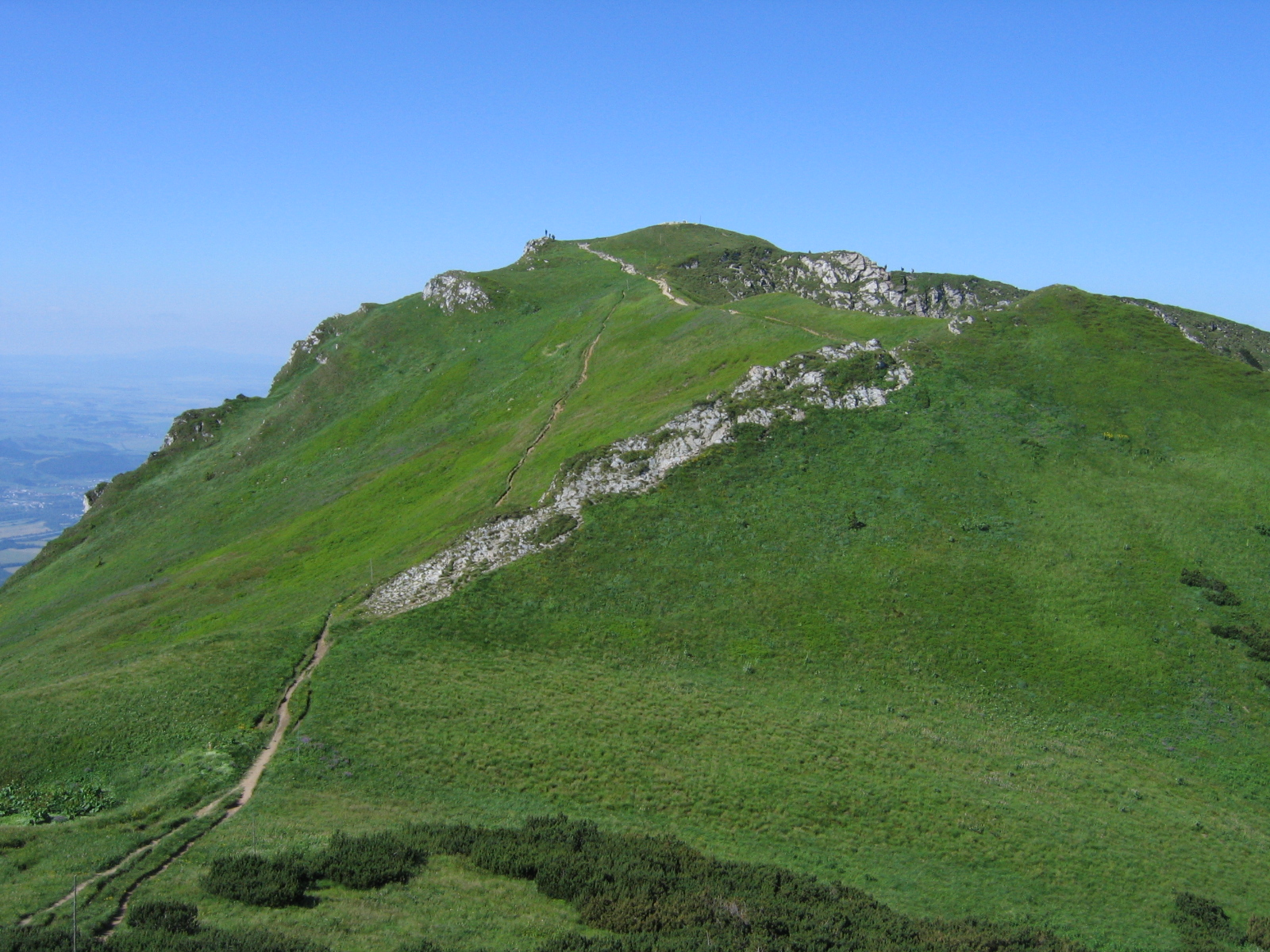
Chleb

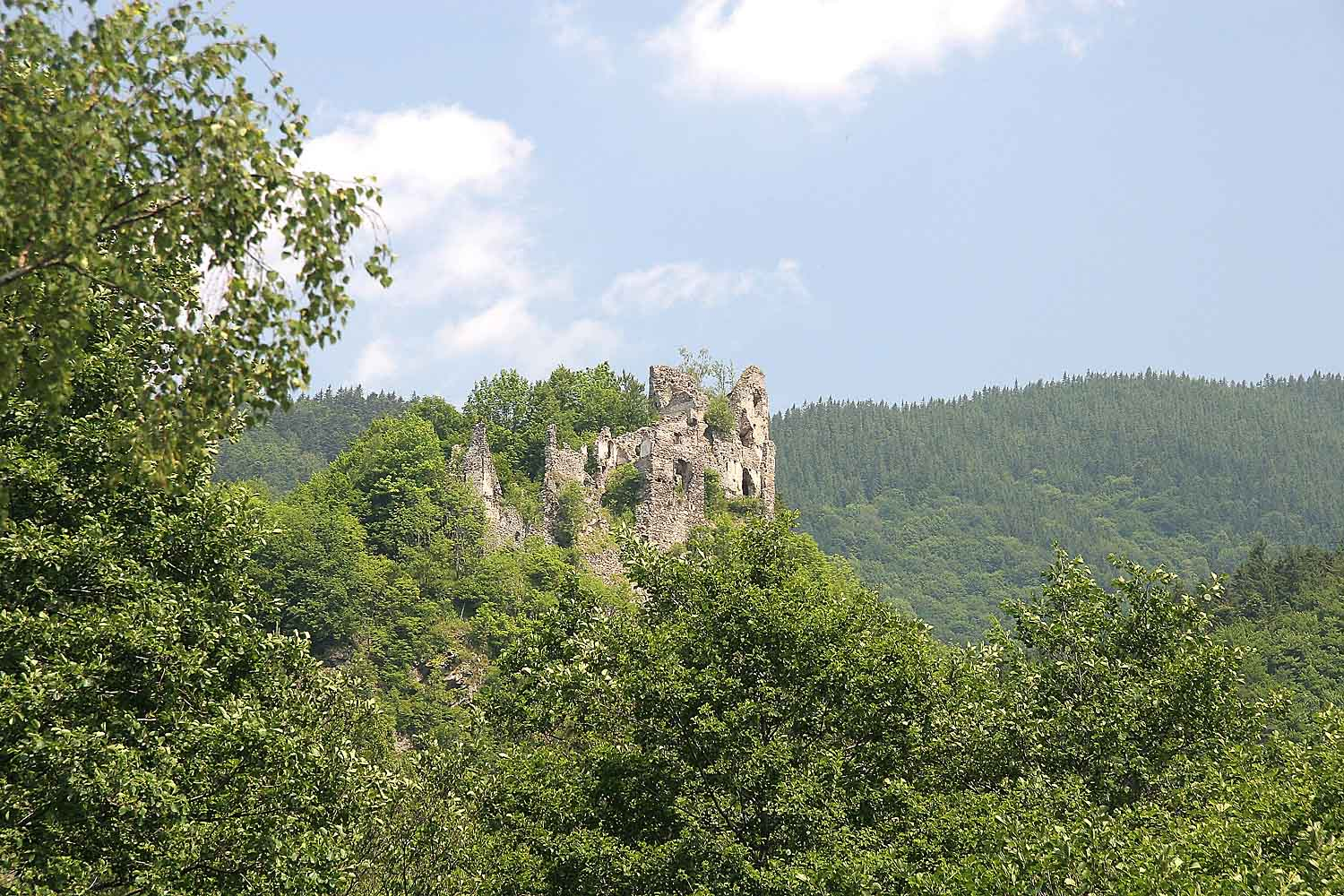
Starý hrad

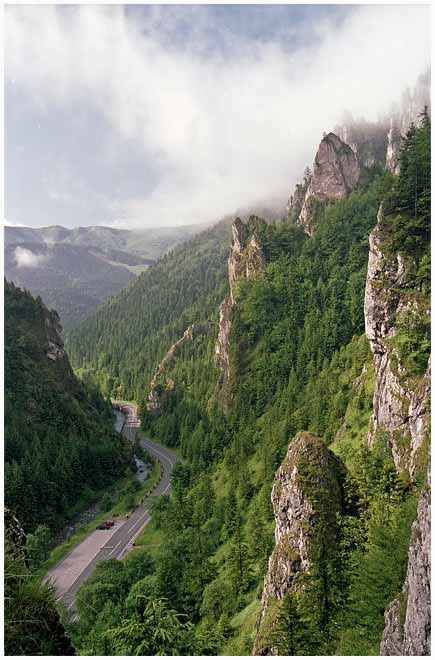
Vrátna dolina

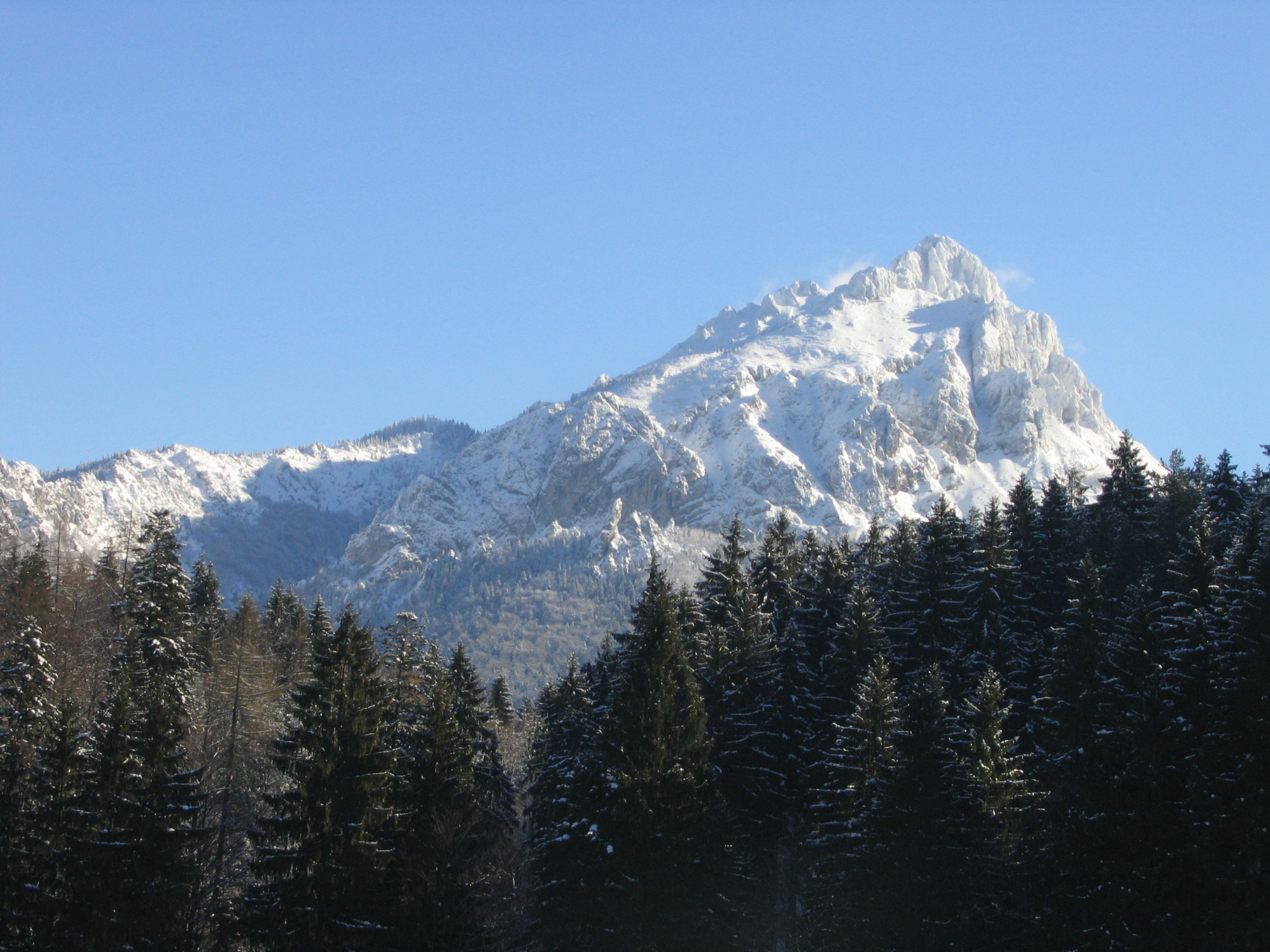
Veľký Rozsutec Mountain

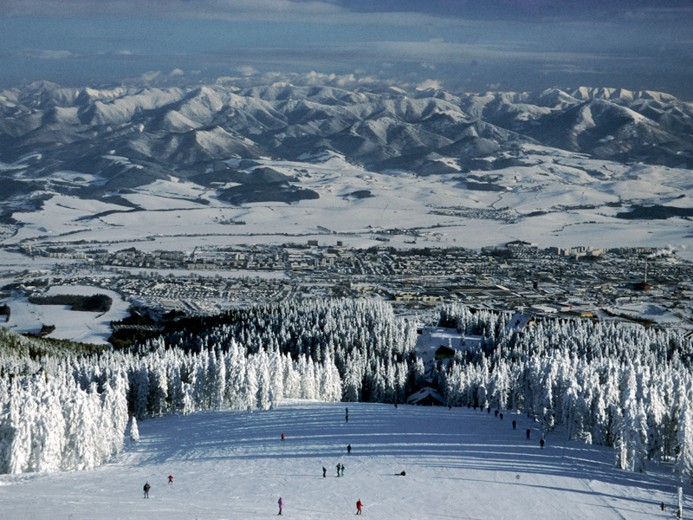
Martinské hole ski resort

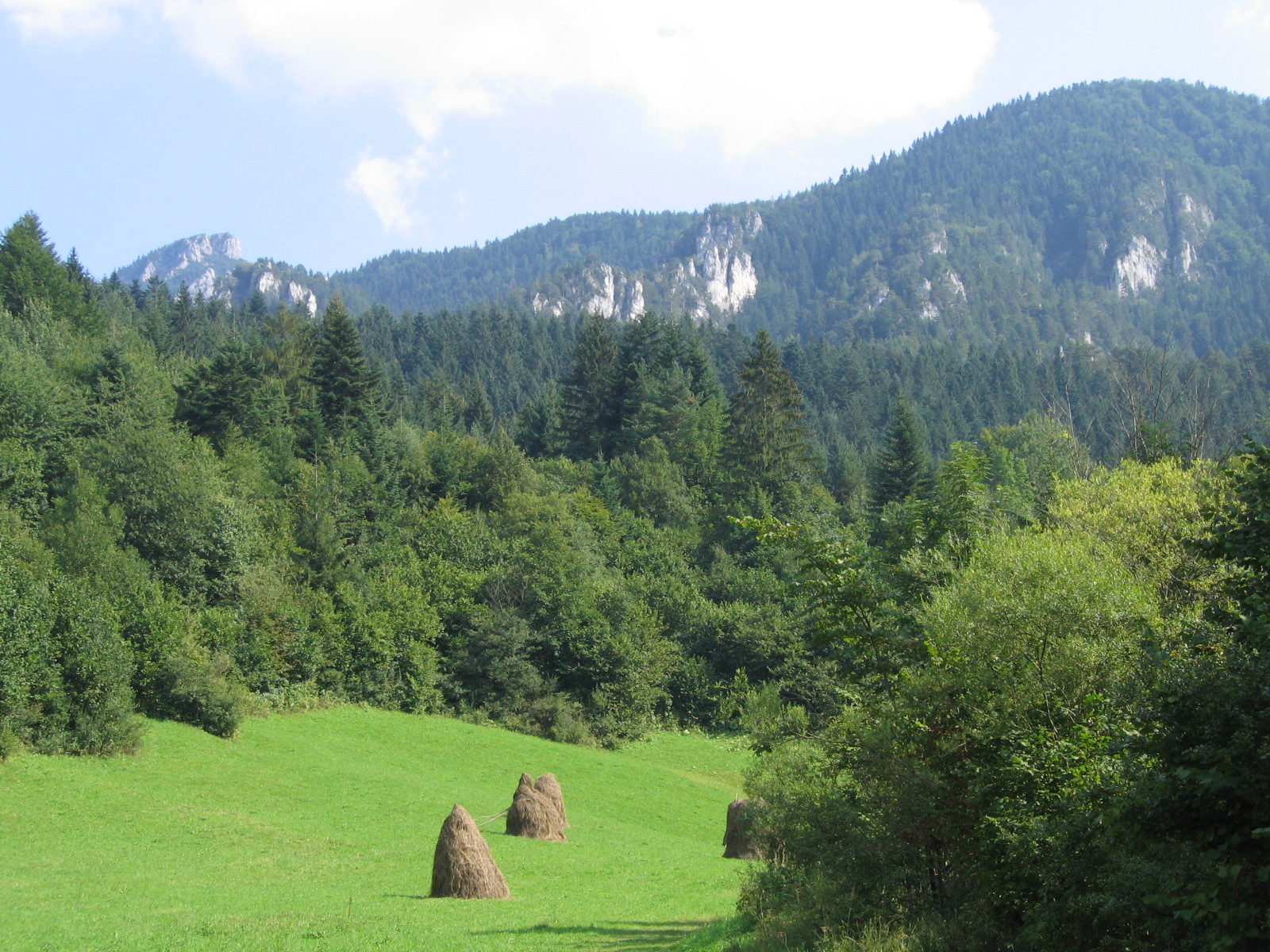
Vrátna dolina

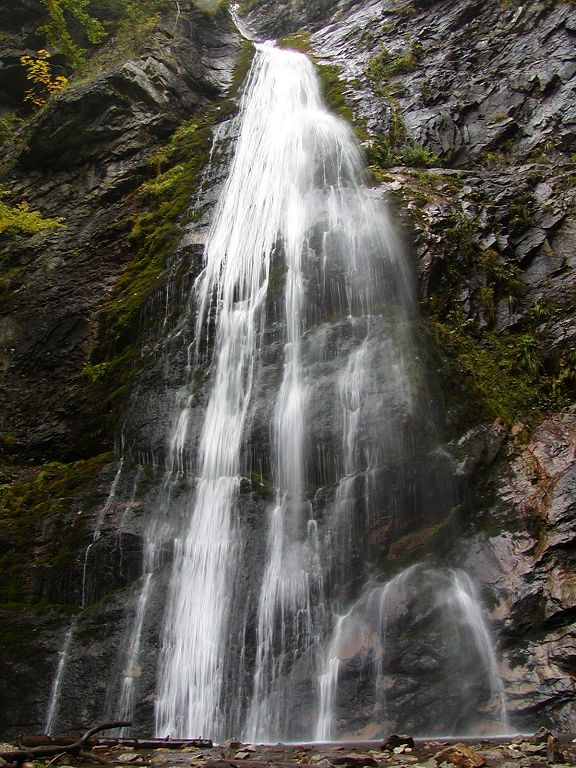
38m tall Šútovo Waterfall

== See also ==
- Mountain Rescue Service (Slovakia)
- Stratenec, a peak within the Krivánska Fatra
