= Veľký Kriváň =

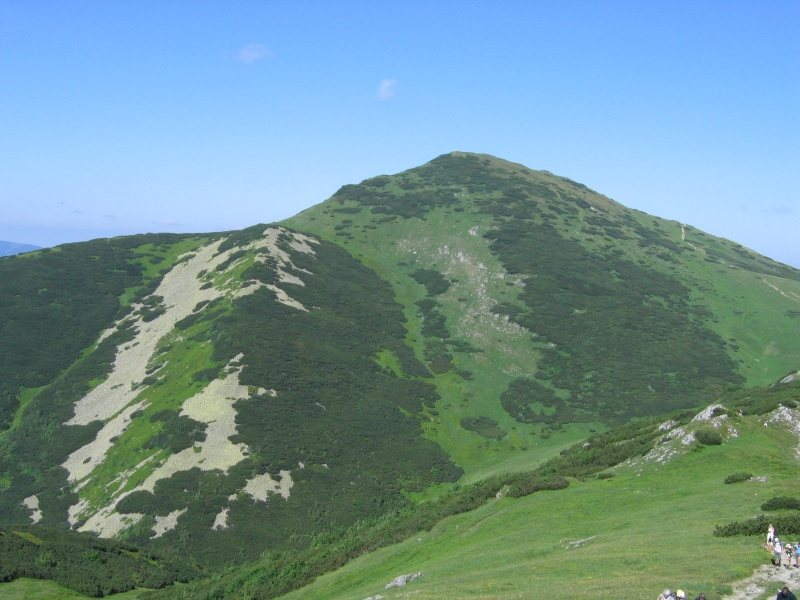

Highest point
- Elevation: 1,708 m (5,604 ft)
- Prominence: 958 m (3,143 ft)
- Isolation: 39.2 km (24.4 mi) to Veľká Chochuľa
- Coordinates: 49°11′16″N 19°1′52″E

Geography
- Location within Slovakia
- Location: Malá Fatra National Park, Žilina, Slovakia
- Parent range: Malá Fatra

Veľký Kriváň (Polish: Wielki Krywań) is the highest mountain in the Lesser Fatra mountain range in Western Carpathians in Slovakia.
