= Crivina =

Crivina may refer to:

- Crivina, a village in the town of Bolintin-Vale, Giurgiu County, Romania
- Crivina, a village in Burila Mare Commune, Mehedinţi County, Romania
- Crivina, a village in Gorgota Commune, Prahova County, Romania
- Crivina, a village in Nădrag Commune, Timiș County, Romania
- Crivina de Sus, a village in Pietroasa Commune, Timiș County, Romania

== See also ==
- Krivina
