= Šútovo =

Village in Slovakia

- Municipality
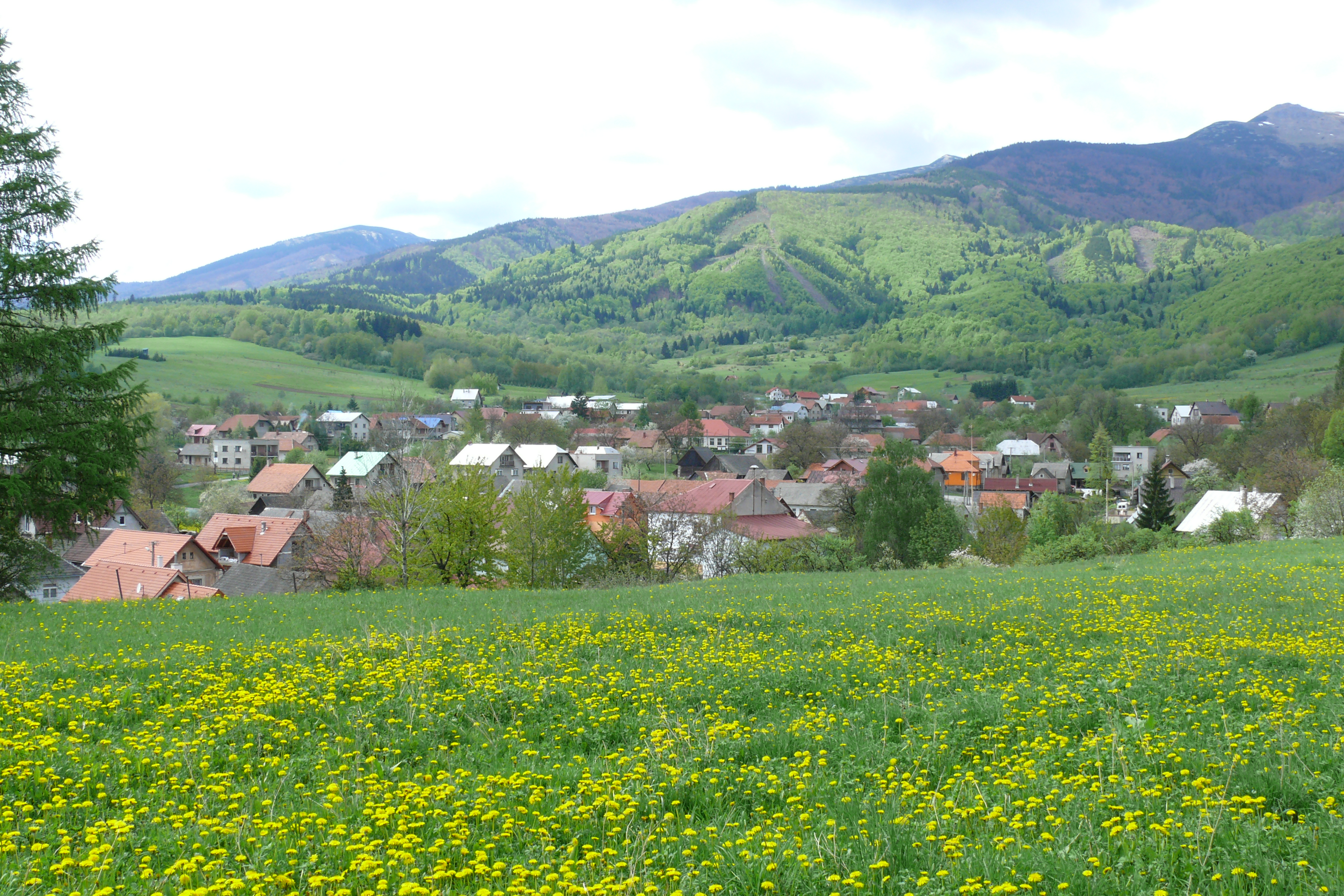

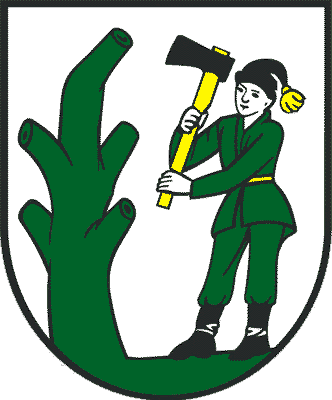
- Flag Coat of arms

- Location of Šútovo in the Žilina Region Location of Šútovo in Slovakia
- Coordinates: 49.15°N 19.08°E
- Country: Slovakia
- Region: Žilina Region
- District: Martin District
- First mentioned: 1403

Area
  - Total: 16.62 km^{2} (6.42 sq mi)
- Elevation: 448 m (1,470 ft)

Population (2025)
  - Total: 498
- Time zone: UTC+1 (CET)
  - Summer (DST): UTC+2 (CEST)
- Postal code: 385 4
- Area code: +421 43
- Vehicle registration plate (until 2022): MT
- Website: www.obecsutovo.sk

Šútovo (Hungarian: Sutó) is a village and municipality in Martin District in the Žilina Region of northern Slovakia.

== History ==
In historical records the village was first mentioned in 1403. Before the establishment of independent Czechoslovakia in 1918, it was part of Turóc County within the Kingdom of Hungary. From 1939 to 1945, it was part of the Slovak Republic.

== Geography ==
The municipality lies at an altitude of 448 metres (1,470 ft) and covers an area of 16.62 km^{2} (6.42 sq mi) (2025).

== Population ==
Population statistic (10 years)
| Year | 1995 | 2005 | 2015 | 2025 |
|---|---|---|---|---|
| Count | 516 | 512 | 508 | 498 |
| Difference | | −0.77% | −0.78% | −1.96% |

Population statistic
| Year | 2024 | 2025 |
|---|---|---|
| Count | 509 | 498 |
| Difference | | −2.16% |

It has a population of 498 people (31 December 2025).

=== Ethnicity ===
Census 2021 (1+ %)
| Ethnicity | Number | Fraction |
|---|---|---|
| Slovak | 505 | 99.21% |
| Total | 509 | |

In year 2021 was 509 people by ethnicity 505 as Slovak, 5 as Not found out, 3 as Czech, 2 as Romani and 1 as French.

Note on population: The difference values of population numbers in the table "Population statistic" and in the sections "Ethnicity" & "Religion" is caused by the use of various statistical methods.

=== Religion ===
Census 2021 (1+ %)
| Religion | Number | Fraction |
|---|---|---|
| Evangelical Church | 358 | 70.33% |
| Roman Catholic Church | 68 | 13.36% |
| None | 59 | 11.59% |
| Other and not ascertained christian church | 7 | 1.38% |
| Total | 509 | |

In year 2021 was 509 people by religion 358 from Evangelical Church, 68 from Roman Catholic Church, 59 from None, 7 from Other and not ascertained christian church, 5 from Not found out, 3 from Paganism and natural spirituality, 3 from Christian Congregations in Slovakia, 3 from Seventh-day Adventist Church, 2 from Ad hoc movements and 1 from Greek Catholic Church.
