= Terchová =

- Municipality
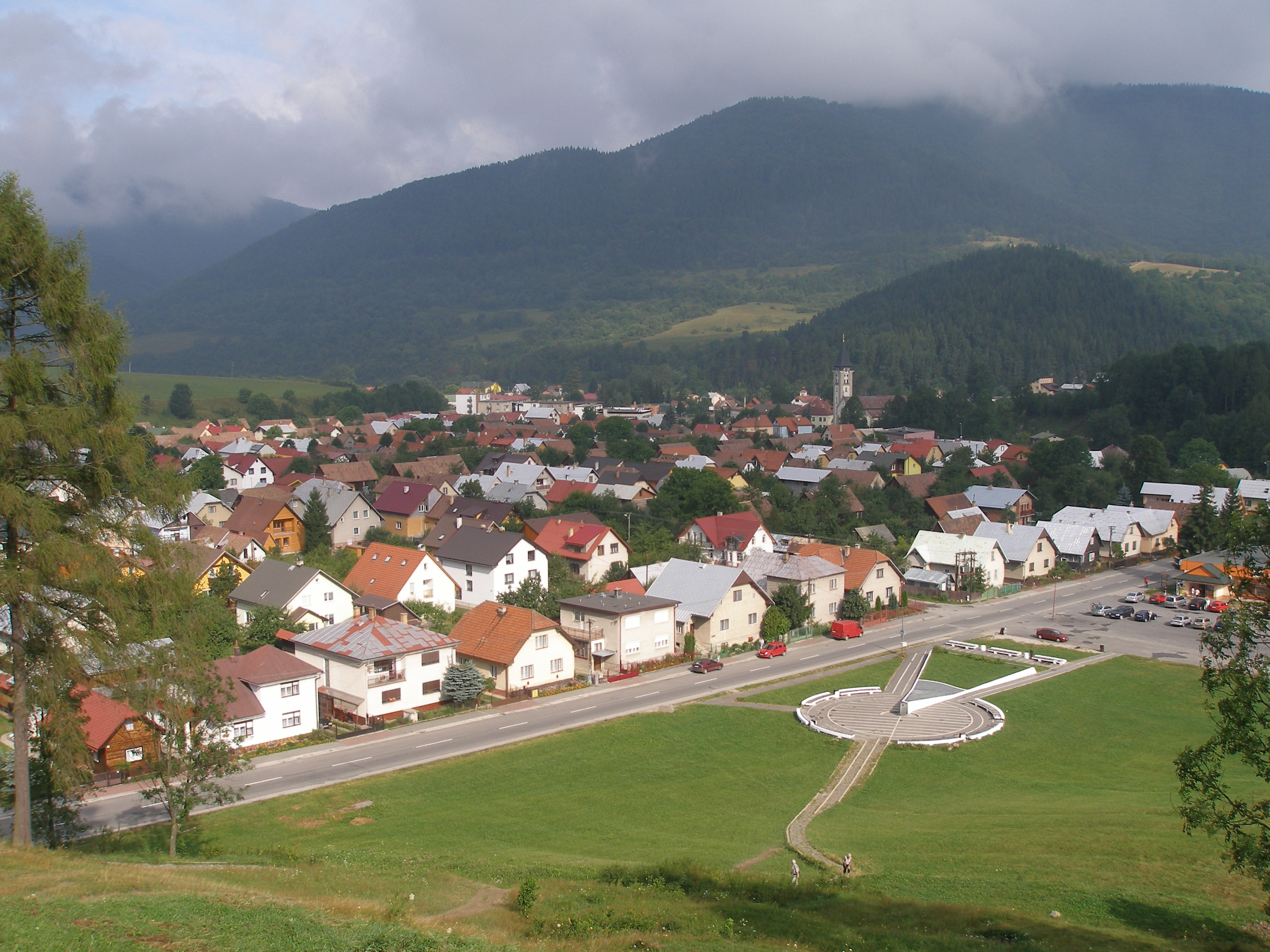

- Flag

- Location of Terchová in the Žilina Region Location of Terchová in Slovakia
- Coordinates: 49.27°N 19.03°E
- Country: Slovakia
- Region: Žilina Region
- District: Žilina District
- First mentioned: 1598

Area
  - Total: 84.54 km^{2} (32.64 sq mi)
- Elevation: 560 m (1,840 ft)

Population (2025)
  - Total: 3,912
- Time zone: UTC+1 (CET)
  - Summer (DST): UTC+2 (CEST)
- Postal code: 130 6
- Area code: +421 41
- Vehicle registration plate (until 2022): ZA
- Website: www.terchova.sk

Terchová (Hungarian: Terhely) is a large village and municipality (population 4,073) in the Malá Fatra mountains in the Žilina District in the Žilina Region of northern Slovakia.

== Names and etymology ==
In the 16th century, the village was known as Kralowa alias Tyerchowa (1598). The name Kralowa means 'royal' in Slovak and refers to royal meadows. The name Tyerchowa comes from the Hungarian noun terhe 'burden', which was borrowed into Slovak before the 12th century as tärcha > ťarcha, and later also as tercha with the Slovak possessive suffix -ova. It refers to legal obligations of the citizens.

== History ==
The village was established in 1580, but the area was inhabited even before its establishment. Originally a Vlach settlement from the period of Vlach colonization, it slowly began to change to an agricultural settlement, as many new settlers in the 17th century came to the village. In the 19th century, several droughts and plagues depopulated the village, as many emigrated to the US, Canada and Argentina. Near the end of World War II, half of the wooden part of the village was burned down. During the first post-war years, it was reconstructed as part of two-year plan. The village is most famous for being the birthplace and town where Juraj Janosik grew up.
In 2013 Music of Terchová was inscribed on the UNESCO's Representative List of the Intangible Cultural Heritage of Humanity.

== Geography ==
The municipality lies at an altitude of 560 metres (1,840 ft) and covers an area of 84.54 km^{2} (32.64 sq mi) (2025). The village lies in a valley in the Malá Fatra mountains, about 25 km east of Žilina. The tourist resort of Vrátna dolina belongs to the village.

== Population ==
Population statistic (10 years)
Year	1995	2005	2015	2025
Count	4072	4065	4061	3912
Difference		−0.17%	−0.09%	−3.66%

Population statistic
Year	2024	2025
Count	3939	3912
Difference		−0.68%

It has a population of 3912 people (31 December 2025).

=== Ethnicity ===
Census 2021 (1+ %)
Ethnicity	Number	Fraction
Slovak	3819	95.26%
Not found out	182	4.53%
Total	4009	

In year 2021 was 4009 people by ethnicity 3819 as Slovak, 182 as Not found out, 20 as Czech, 8 as Other, 5 as Moravian, 4 as Hungarian, 3 as Ukrainian, 3 as Italian, 3 as Croatian, 2 as German, 1 as Silesian, 1 as Romani, 1 as Russian, 1 as Romanian, 1 as Polish, 1 as English and 1 as Albanian.

Note on population: The difference values of population numbers in the table "Population statistic" and in the sections "Ethnicity" & "Religion" is caused by the use of various statistical methods.

=== Religion ===
Census 2021 (1+ %)
Religion	Number	Fraction
Roman Catholic Church	3455	86.18%
None	262	6.54%
Not found out	171	4.27%
Total	4009	

In year 2021 was 4009 people by religion 3455 from Roman Catholic Church, 262 from None, 171 from Not found out, 22 from Christian Congregations in Slovakia, 22 from Greek Catholic Church, 17 from Evangelical Church, 12 from Other, 12 from Ad hoc movements, 9 from Old Catholic Church, 8 from Calvinist Church, 7 from Other and not ascertained christian church, 6 from Eastern Orthodox Church, 2 from Buddhism, 1 from Paganism and natural spirituality, 1 from Jehovah's Witnesses, 1 from Islam and 1 from Czechoslovak Hussite Church.

== Gallery ==
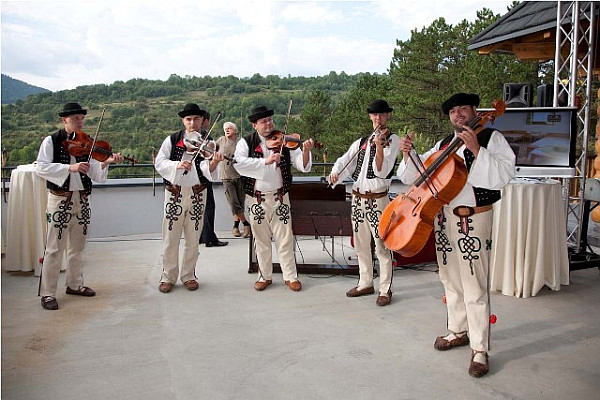
Volk musicians in Terchová

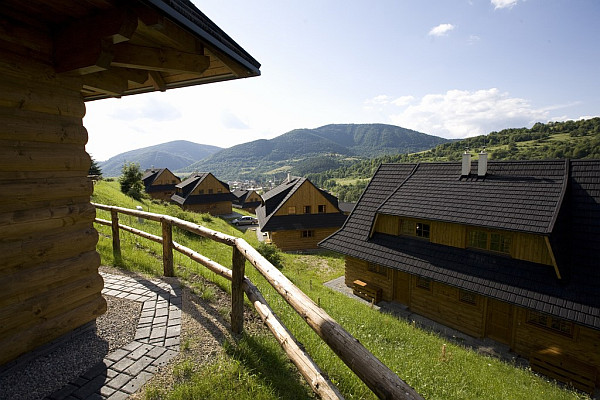
Wooden architecture in Terchová

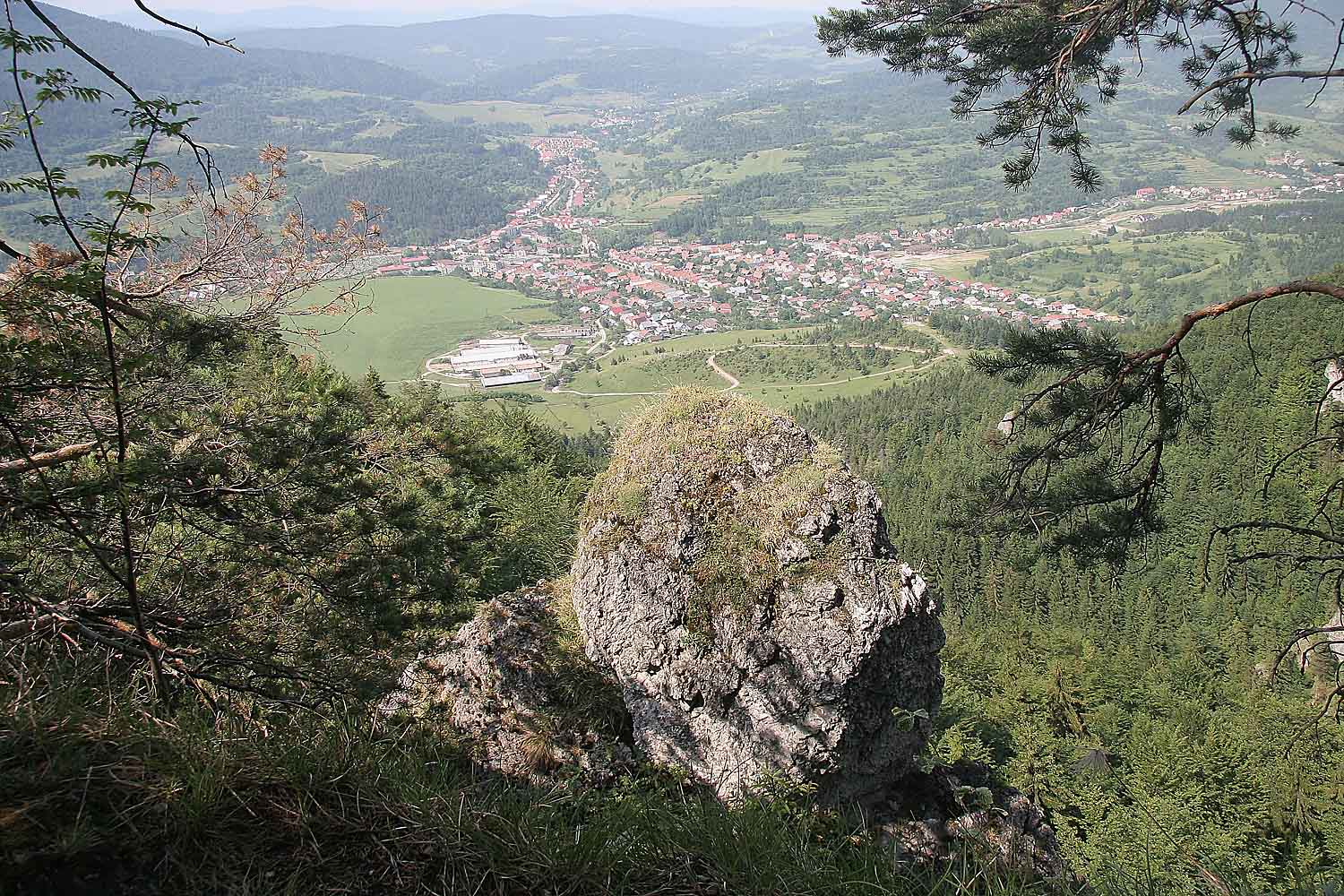
Terchová from Obšivanka

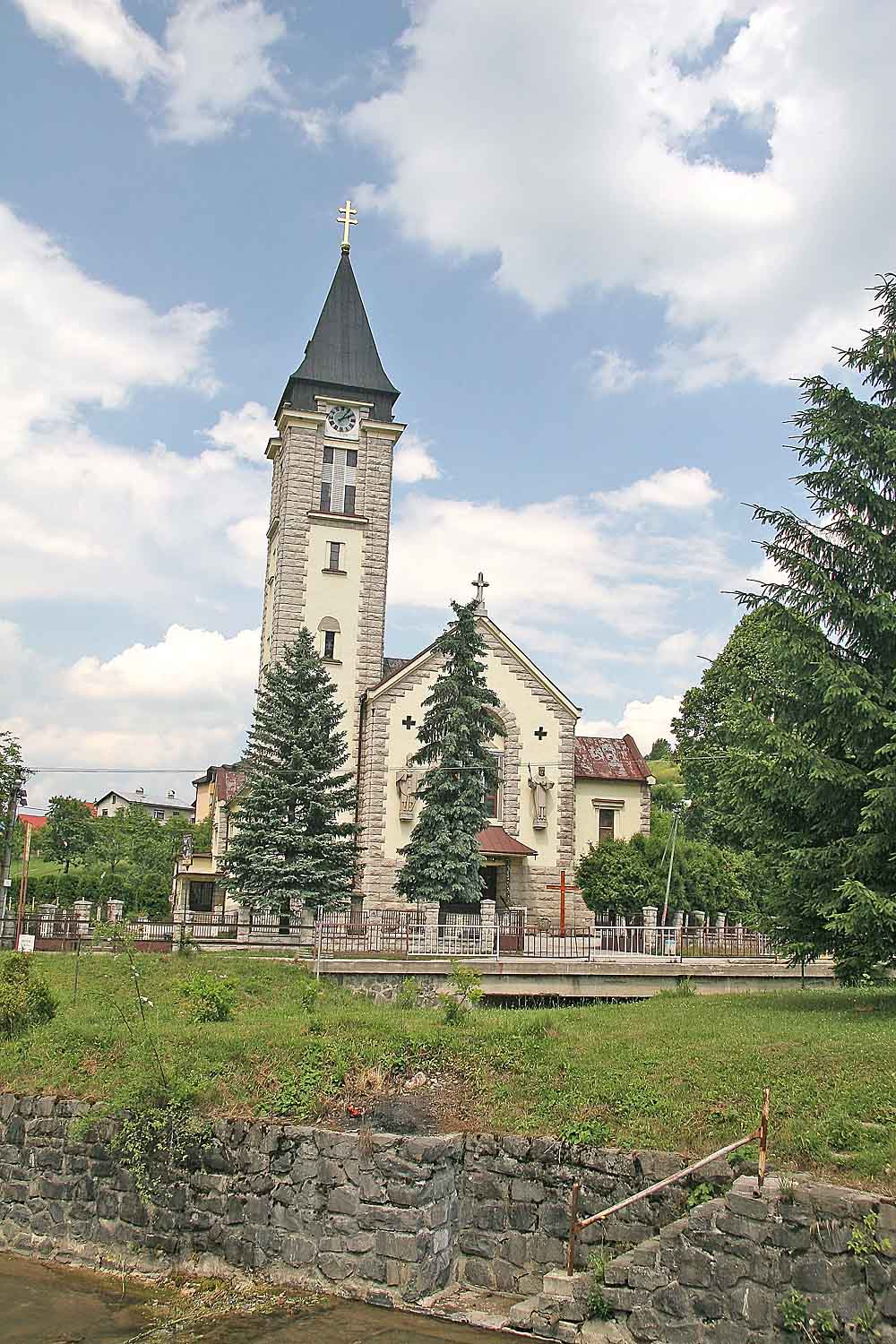
Church of Saints Cyril and Methodius

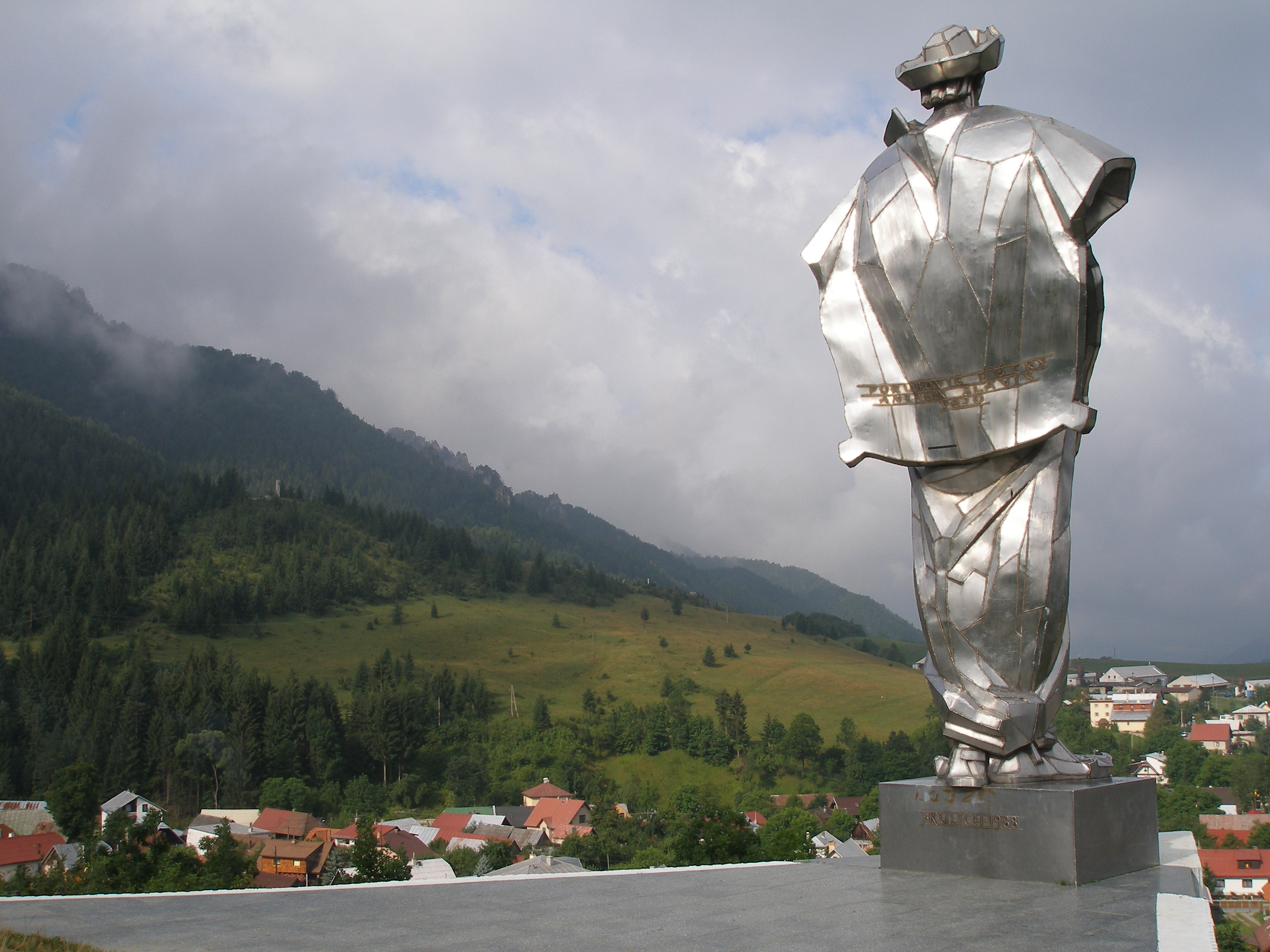
Jánošík's statue

== Notable births ==
- Birthplace of Juraj Jánošík, who is commonly referred to as a Slovak Robin Hood.
- Birthplace of Adam František Kollár, Slovak writer, historian and librarian.
