= Church of the Holy Trinity, Mošovce =

Church in Žilina Region, Slovakia

Coordinates: 48°54′40″N 18°53′12″E

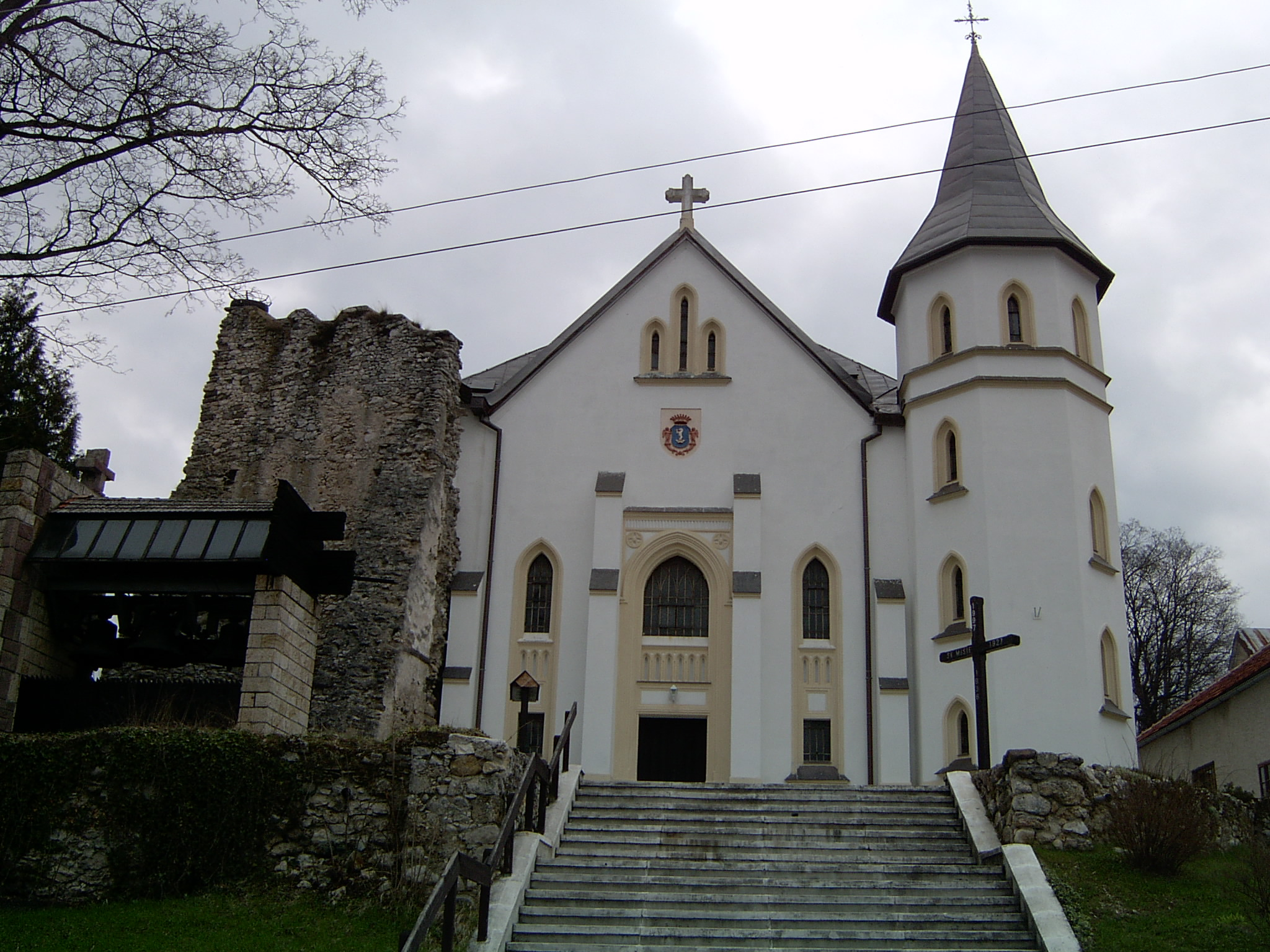
The Church of Holy Trinity today

The Church of Holy Trinity is a church in Mošovce. In the past, the gothic church had a tower, which was the dominant feature of its surroundings, and it belonged to the most monumental sacral buildings in Turiec.

The tower, a significant dominant of the town, fulfilled several roles: The town and its surroundings resounded with the ringing of its four bells. The largest one – Obecný, was cast in 1704 and weighed 900 kg, the second one was called Odschod, the third one Median, and the fourth, which weighed 70 kg, bore the name of Umrláč. A tiny bell was located separately in the church wall.

The tower, situated at the church's main façade, was built separately facing west, and had a rectangular ground plan of 8,6 x 7,2 m. Its height of 45 meters had to be supported by the thickness of the walls, with three of them being 1,5 m thick, and the fourth, common with the church wall, measuring 1,2 m. This thickness can also be observed today at the remnants of the tower wall. The basic building material was square and raw stone. The corners were accentuated by stone blocks. The tower was covered with a low pyramid-shaped roof with the original shingle covering.

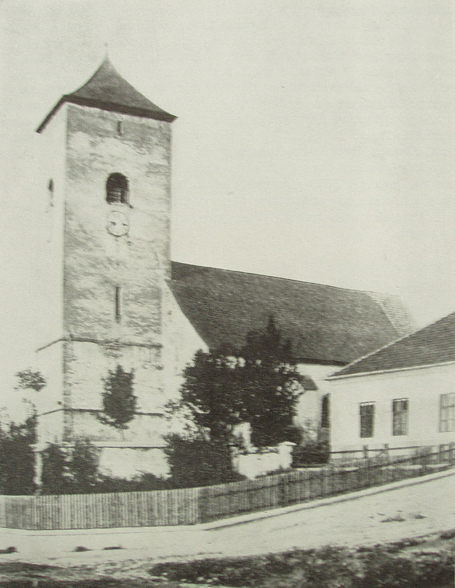
The Original gothic church in around 1910.

Windows were located at two thirds of its height and were finished with arches. Under the windows, on three sides of the wall (southern, western and northern), ticked a tower clock. The predecessor of this clock was an ancient sundial situated in the southern side of the church wall.

By the end of the 19th century, the church, at that time almost 600 years old, was considerably damaged and run-down. Because it was built on a marshland, the 1,5 m thick stone gothic vault began to crack on many places in spite of being secured by thick stone pillars at the sides of the church.

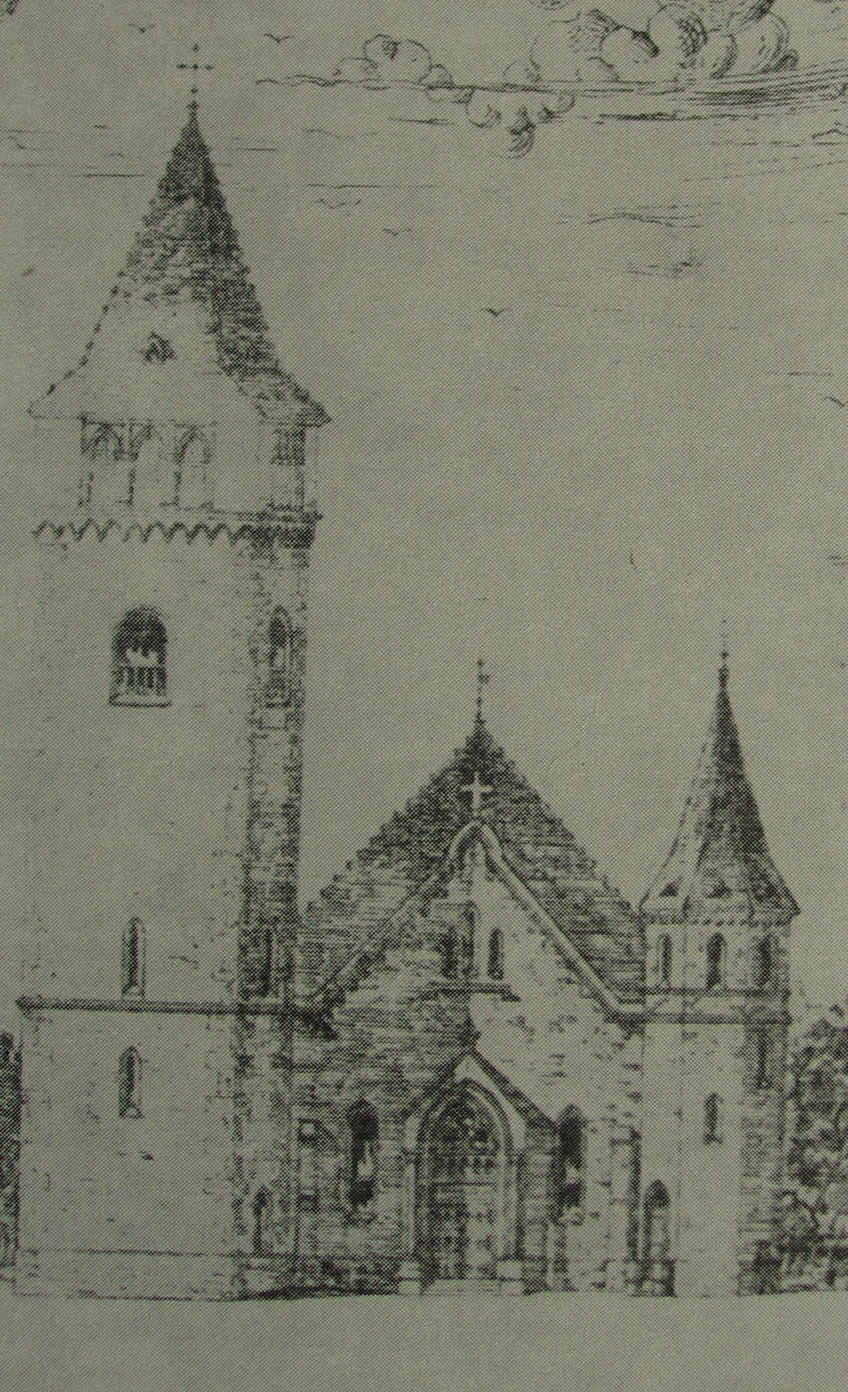
The newly built church in 1913, before the tower's demolition

There was a danger of the vault falling apart, and therefore the patron of the church – Baron František Révay – ordered its demolition.

Unlike its predecessor, the new neogothic church, which was created at the same site, took only 2 years to build (1912–1913). The building methods of the historizing sacral architecture were considerably close to today's procedures. To secure the stability of the church, it was built on a thick concrete slab. The new church is displaced from its predecessor by a couple of meters in the southwestern direction. The new church has three aisles, and a lateral, hexagonal tower, which accommodates a staircase leading to the church gallery.

Originally, the old tower was left intact. After a closer examination, however, it was found that it was leaning – it diverged 45 cm from the vertical. Because of fears of its collapse, on 21 June 1913 it was decided that the old tower would be demolished, and a new one would be built in its place. As a support of this decision, Baron Révay donated 80.000 crowns for its construction. However, during the demolition the adjacent wall of the newly built church began to crack, and therefore the tower wall had to be rebuilt up to the height of the top of the church roof, and is still standing there in symbiosis with the church.

== See also ==
- Mošovce
- Révay
- Lutheran Church in Mošovce
