= Péter Révay =

Hungarian nobleman and poet

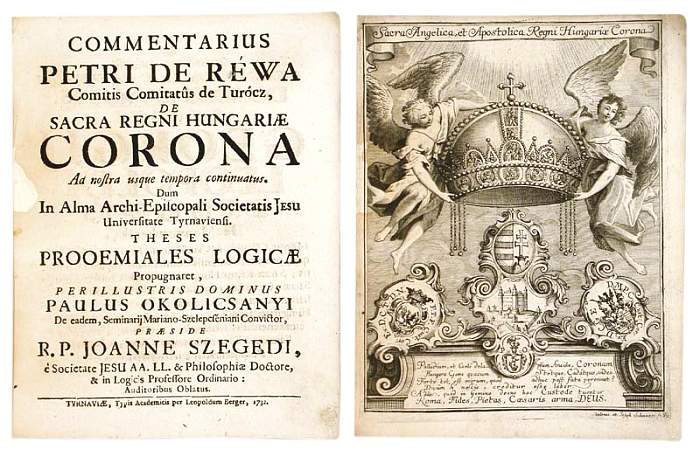
- De Sacra Regni Hungariae Corona
- Born: 2 February 1568; Szklabonya (Sklabiňa), Kingdom of Hungary (today Slovakia)
- Died: 4 June 1622 (aged 54); Trencsén (Trenčín), Kingdom of Hungary (today Slovakia)
- Other names: Peter Révai, Peter Réva, Peter Rewa, Révay Péter, Révai Péter, Rewa Péter, Réva Péter
- Occupations: Poet, state official, soldier and historian

Baron Péter Révay de Szklabina et Blathnicza (used aliases of his name include Révai, Rewa, Réva; 2 February 1568 – 4 June 1622) was a Hungarian nobleman, Royal Crown Guard for the Holy Crown of Hungary, poet, state official, soldier, and historian. He was the grandson of Ferenc Révay.

== Life ==
Péter Révay was born in Szklabina, a member of an old family from the Turóc region. He was the third child of Mihály Révay and his mother Anna Bakics. He received his education in Bártfa, Jihlava, probably also in Vienna, and between 1589 and 1591 in Strasbourg, where he was awarded the title of a Master of Philosophy. In 1598 he became the hereditary county head (called a főispán) of the Turóc Comitatus. From 1601 he discharged the duties of a Royal Commissary. He became Royal Crown Guard in 1608. In 1610 he became the Royal Courtmaster, from 1615 the Chief Doormaster, and from 1619 a Tablemaster. He had a relatively wide-reaching knowledge of philosophy and history, mastered the art of oration, several languages, built a rich library, and thanks to the above became a respected political and cultural personality. He fought in a war with the Ottoman Empire (Esztergom, Visegrád, Fülek, Nógrád). He also became one of the leading representatives of Lutheran nobility, supporting sacral literature. He died in Trencsén, but was buried in Turócszentmárton.

== Work ==
His poetry and historical works influenced the later Slovak historical literature and patriotic works. Révay started producing literature during his studies in Strasbourg. His first work (besides his master thesis) was published in 1592 (De parricidio (Grand Treason)). As one of the first historiasn in the territory of Hungary, he argued for the ancientness of the Slavs. His works presented Hungary as a multi-national state. His correspondence with the officials of his county was conducted in a cultivated Slovak.

== List of works ==
- 1591 – De laudibus Ciceronis, a lecture advocating oration
- 1591 – De quattuor virtutibus cardinalibus, a tractate
- 1591 – Disputatio de mutuo materiae
- 1592 – De parricidio, article
- 1613 – De sacra corona regni Hungariae ortu, virtuti, victoria, fortuna… brevis commentarius, A discourse of the Holy Crown of Hungary.
- 1659 – De monarchia et sacra corona regni hungariae centuriae septem a more comprehensive work about the history of the Kingdom of Hungary and the Holy Crown of Hungary.

== See also ==
- Révay
