= Sklabiňa Castle =

Medieval castle in Slovakia

- Sklabiňa, Slovakia
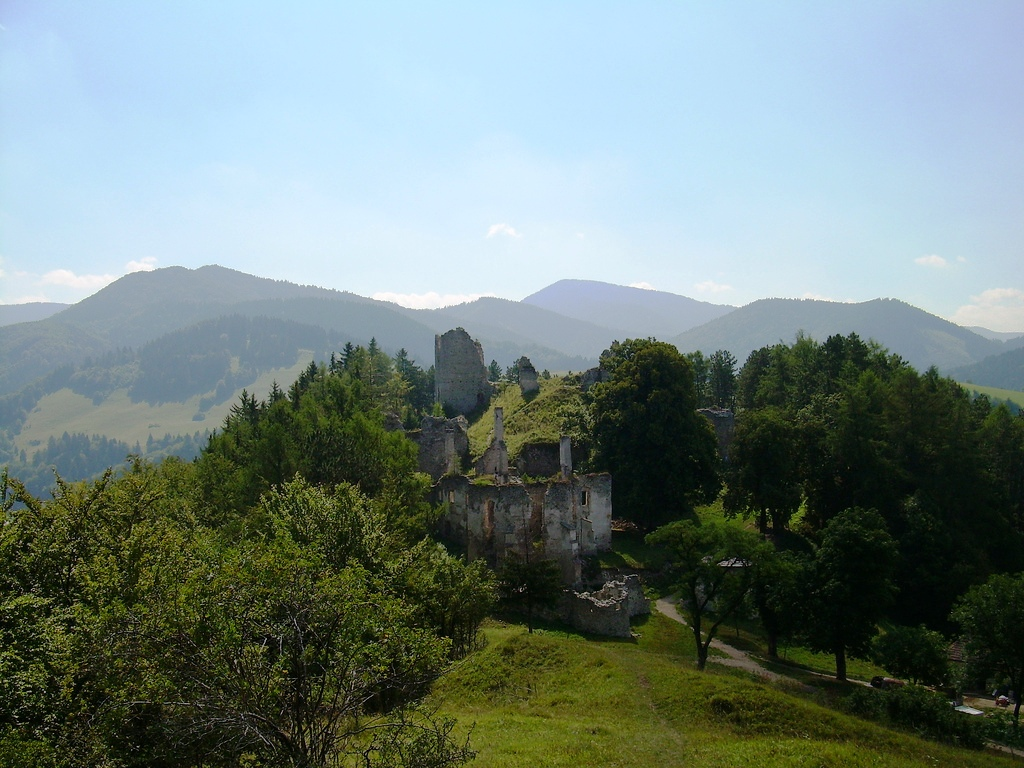
- View of the castle ruins.

Site information
- Condition: Ruined

Location
- Location in Slovakia
- Location within Slovakia
- Coordinates: 49.0547°N 19.0192°E

Site history
- Built: 13th century

Sklabiňa Castle or Castle of Sklabiňa is a ruined medieval castle near Sklabiňa, a village in northern Slovakia. Located at an altitude of 626 meters above sea level, it is one of the largest and most visited castles in the Žilina Region.

== History ==
The castle was most likely built in stages, initially in the first half of the 13th century. The first mention of the nearby village dates back to 1242. A document from 1309 signed by one of the builders, Master Donč, mentions the castle. It was in the early 14th century when the area of the castle was likely expanded. In 1328 the castle became the seat of Turiec (Turóc County) and remained so until the mid-18th century. This meant, among others, that the castle housed the county prison and archives. The castle was burned down by Hussites in 1434. It was further expanded in the second half of the 15th century.

Sklabiňa Castle was acquired by the Révay family in 1527 and they continuously owned it until 1914. Unlike many other castles in Slovakia, which were gradually ruined or abandoned during late Middle Ages or the Renaissance period, Sklabiňa was in use until it was destroyed by Nazi forces in September 1944 as part of the suppression of the Slovak National Uprising. While the original castle was deteriorating over the centuries, the Révays added a Renaissance manor house to the castle complex in early 17th century.

== Current condition ==
Sklabiňa Castle laid largely in ruins since 1944, with only minimal repairs carried out in 1970, until 2000 when a group of volunteers began restoration works on the castle. Archaeological and restoration works have continued since, rendering some buildings of the castle accessible again. Between 2020 and 2024, the castle has received between 10 and 13 thousand visitors annually.

== See also ==
- List of castles in Slovakia
