= Mošovce Park =

Park in Mošovce, Slovakia

Coordinates: 48°54′39″N 18°53′22″E

Mošovce park is a park in Mošovce, Turčianske Teplice District. It has been an integral part of the village since the 18th century.

== Description ==
Mošovce park is a typical example of an English park, with groups of trees interspersed with free grassland and bodies of water. It seamlessly merges with the surrounding nature, since the majority of park objects consist of native woody plants. Angiosperms include mainly maple, ash, beech, oak, Hornbeam, linden, black locust, and birch, and conifers include several genera of spruce, pine and fir. Rare exotic plants include Ginkgo biloba from East Asia or chestnut. The 16.5m area of the park makes it the largest in Central Slovakia. It was built by the Révay family, likely before the construction of the new manor house.

== Pavilion ==
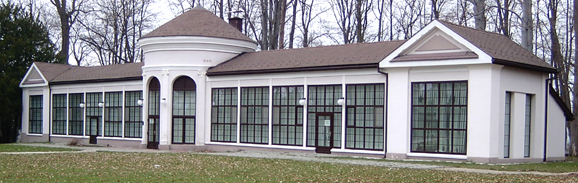
Garden pavilion

The park also features a classical garden pavilion with a round ground-plan and added lateral wings. The pavilion, with its large semicircular windows, is covered by a dome-roof. It was built in 1800 to serve as a greenhouse. Until recently it was used for storing tools for the maintenance of the park, then it was turned into an aqua-center with a sauna, massages, and a swimming pool. It is currently abandoned.

== Mausoleum ==
A former neogothic chapel with a mausoleum, whose interior presently hosts the Museum of Mošovce Crafts. Its exhibition includes tools used in the manufacture of well-known Mošovce products.

== Greenhouse ==
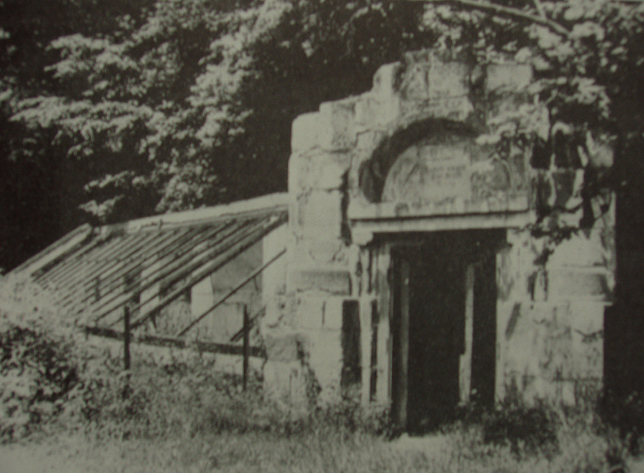
Art Nouveau greenhouse

In 1913 an Art Nouveau greenhouse was built not far from the garden pavilion. It was located on the left side of the path serving as the main entrance to the park. Stone material from the old gothic church, demolished in 1912, was used at its construction, but unfortunately, the building of the greenhouse didn't manage to survive until today. It was a small building facing east and west. Around 1930 the new owners of the Révay estate, the Hubays, had the antechamber of the greenhouse renovated. The three outer walls of the greenhouse were for the most part rebuilt again, using the decorative cornerstones of the old church and tower. This way the material from the oldest times of Mošovce (beginning of the 14th century) was saved for future generations. The greenhouse entrance faced south. Over it was a Latin inscription, which read: ANTUQUIOR ET TAMEN JUNIOR SUM QUAM VIDEOR. It meant: I AM OLDER AND YET YOUNGER THAN I SEEM. After World War II, the greenhouse was in a critical condition. People were disassembling the precious stone material and using it for construction of their own houses. Today, no trace can be found of the greenhouse.

== Mošovce avenues ==
North-western side of the park is connected to two Mošovce avenues, included in the list of natural monuments.

== See also ==
- Manor House in Mošovce
- Mošovce
- Neogothic chapel in Mošovce
- Révay family
