= Neogothic chapel in Mošovce =

Chapel, mausoleum and museum in Slovakia

Coordinates: 48°54′40″N 18°53′14.5″E

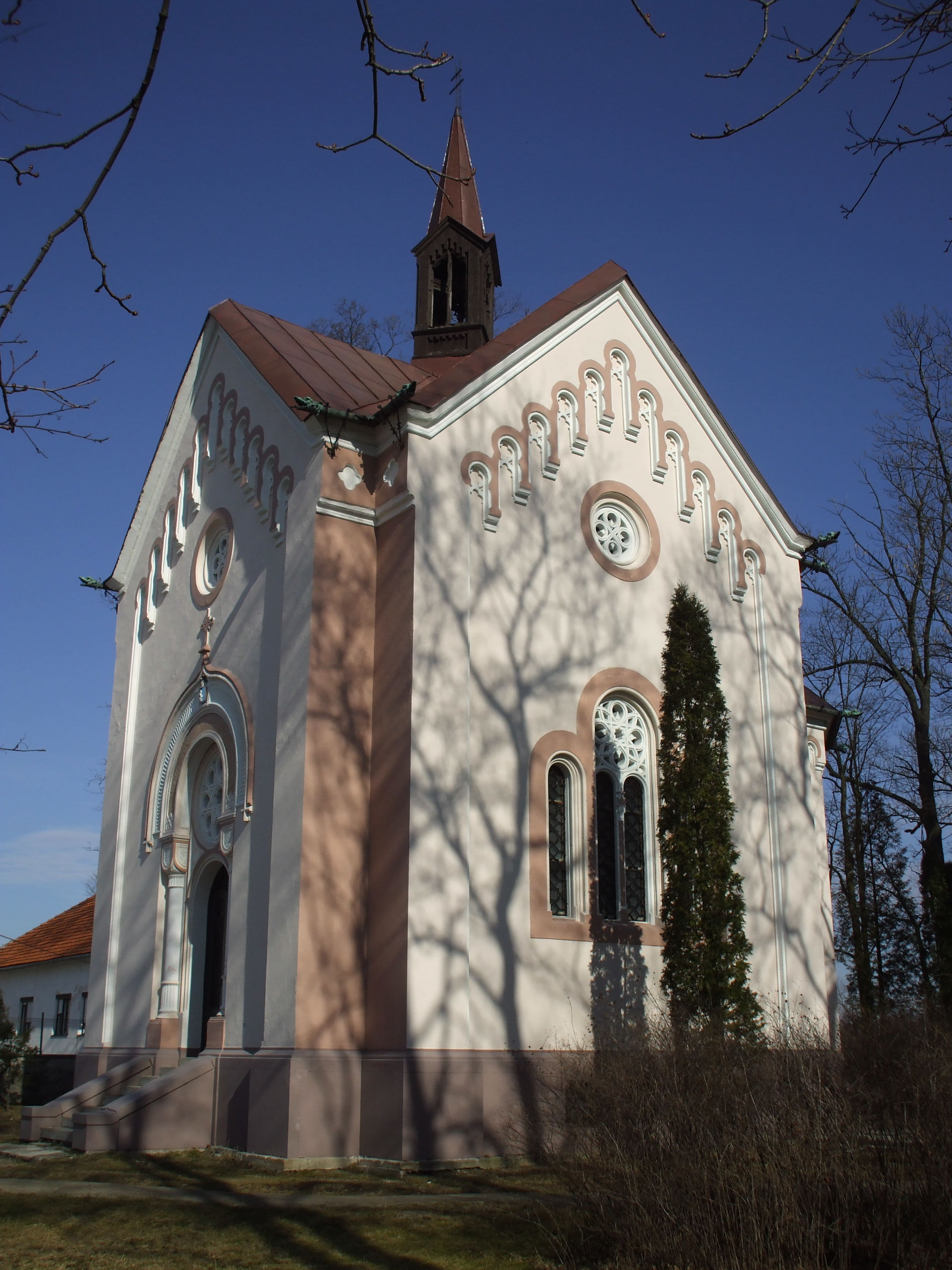
Neogothic chapel in Mošovce

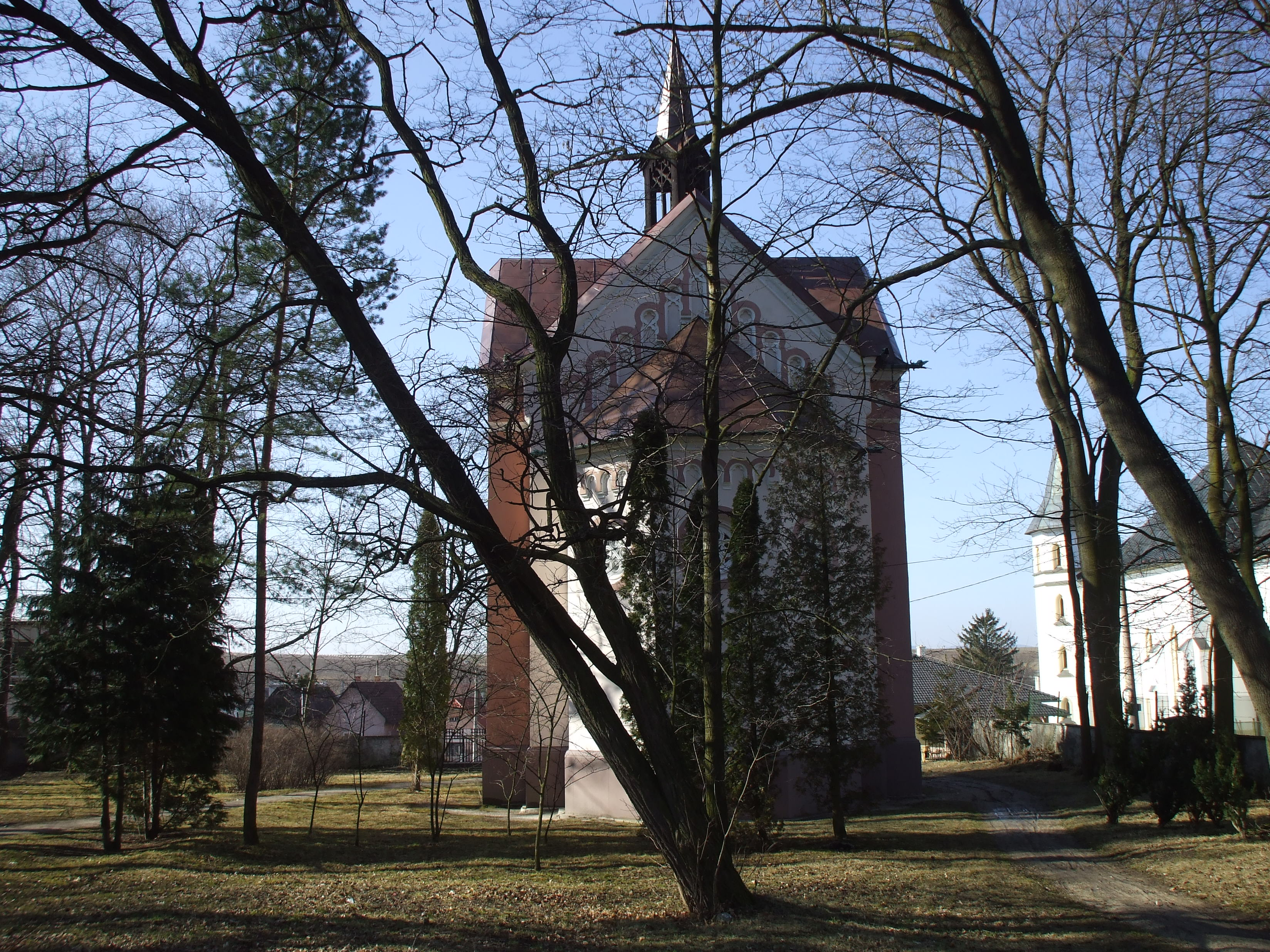
view from park

The Neogothic chapel in Mošovce, Slovakia was constructed in 1911 by Count Ferenc Révay as a mausoleum. The upper part of this neogothic building was used as a chapel and the lower as a crypt. Its exterior features a wide range of neogothic components. The interior presently hosts the Museum of Mošovce Crafts. Its exhibition includes tools used in the manufacture of well-known Mošovce products. The chapel is situated in the west corner of a park, which was also established by Count Révay. Rarities in the park include the exotic chestnut and ginkgo trees.

== See also ==
- Manor House in Mošovce
- Church of Holy Trinity in Mošovce
- Mošovce Park
