= Turčianska Štiavnička =

- Municipality
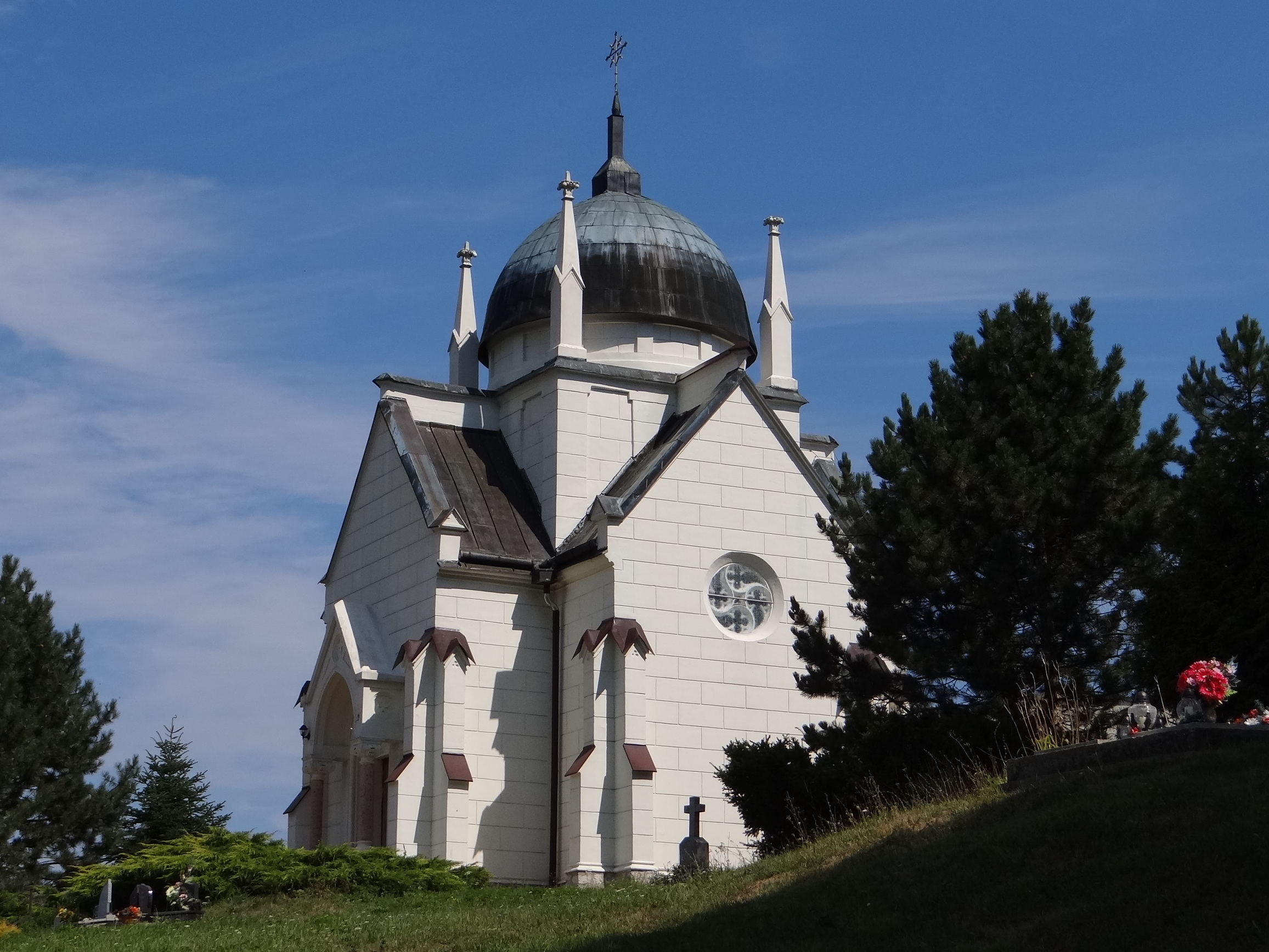
- Révay family mausoleum

- Flag Coat of arms

- Location of Turčianska Štiavnička in the Žilina Region Location of Turčianska Štiavnička in Slovakia
- Coordinates: 49.09°N 19.02°E
- Country: Slovakia
- Region: Žilina Region
- District: Martin District
- First mentioned: 1474

Area
  - Total: 14.07 km^{2} (5.43 sq mi)
- Elevation: 430 m (1,410 ft)

Population (2025)
  - Total: 994
- Time zone: UTC+1 (CET)
  - Summer (DST): UTC+2 (CEST)
- Postal code: 385 1
- Area code: +421 43
- Vehicle registration plate (until 2022): MT
- Website: www.tstiavnicka.sk

Turčianska Štiavnička (Hungarian: Kisselmec) is a village and municipality in Martin District in the Žilina Region of northern Slovakia.

== History ==
In historical records the village was first mentioned in 1474. Before the establishment of independent Czechoslovakia in 1918, it was part of Turóc County within the Kingdom of Hungary. From 1939 to 1945, it was part of the Slovak Republic.

== Geography ==
The municipality lies at an altitude of 430 metres (1,410 ft) and covers an area of 14.07 km^{2} (5.43 sq mi) (2025).

== Population ==
Population statistic (10 years)
Year	1995	2005	2015	2025
Count	715	808	931	994
Difference		+13.00%	+15.22%	+6.76%

Population statistic
Year	2024	2025
Count	999	994
Difference		−0.50%

It has a population of 994 people (31 December 2025).

=== Ethnicity ===
Census 2021 (1+ %)
Ethnicity	Number	Fraction
Slovak	932	97.69%
Not found out	14	1.46%
Total	954	

In year 2021 was 954 people by ethnicity 932 as Slovak, 14 as Not found out, 9 as Czech, 9 as Other, 2 as English, 1 as Ukrainian, 1 as Russian and 1 as Greek.

Note on population: The difference values of population numbers in the table "Population statistic" and in the sections "Ethnicity" & "Religion" is caused by the use of various statistical methods.

=== Religion ===
Census 2021 (1+ %)
Religion	Number	Fraction
None	322	33.75%
Roman Catholic Church	302	31.66%
Evangelical Church	280	29.35%
Not found out	25	2.62%
Total	954	

In year 2021 was 954 people by religion 322 from None, 302 from Roman Catholic Church, 280 from Evangelical Church, 25 from Not found out, 9 from Greek Catholic Church, 6 from Islam, 4 from Paganism and natural spirituality, 2 from Christian Congregations in Slovakia, 2 from Ad hoc movements, 1 from Old Catholic Church and 1 from Czechoslovak Hussite Church.
