= Jur Tesák Mošovský =

Jur Tesák Mošovský (also Juraj Tesák Mošovský with aliases Tesacius, Tesachyus, Tessak, Thesacius, Thesak, with the surname of Moschovinus, Mossoviensis, Pannonius) (around 1545, Mošovce – 27 August 1617, Prague) was a church dignitary and a Slovak Baroque writer and playwright, whose works are classified as a part of the Humanism period.

== Life ==
He received education in Mošovce, Košice, Kežmarok, and Jihlava. Around 1577 Tesák Mošovský was ordained a priest and became an Utraquist preacher. He worked in various towns in the Czech Republic (Říčany, Český Brod, Slaný, Hradec Králové, Kouřim, Prague). He was married to Anna, with whom they had two sons and four daughters. One of the sons took after his father and also became a writer (Adam Tesák Českobrodský).

== Work ==
Tesák Mošovský created many works in the Czech and Latin language, out of which only 38 titles have been preserved until the present day. He wrote religious-educational ethical texts, occasionally Latin poems (elegies, epitaphs), contemplations, and sermons). His works had mainly theological character, but he also studied natural sciences and wrote observations and criticisms of the contemporary social conditions. In his words Tesák Mošovský uses humorous elements, live, and informal language.

== List of works ==
- 1590 - Knížka o pravém a úpřimném přátelství (Book on True and Sincere Friendship)
- 1951 - O lakomství (On Meanness)
- 1601 - Mnemosynom...Písnička na památku zložená (Mnemosynom...Reminiscence Song)
- 1604 – Komedie z knihy Zákona božího, jenž slove Ruth, sebraná (Reformation play, where the author tells the Biblical story of Noemi and her daughter-in-law Ruth).
- 1607 - Stella nova et cometae
- 1608 - Tenorové antifóny (Tenor antiphoneae)
- 1611 - Collis vinearius, to jest O vinohradech a horách viničných (On Vineyards and Wine Hills)
- 1612 - Poutník duchovní (Spiritual Pilgrim)
- 1616 - Knížka o přátelství (Book on Friendship)
