= Frico Kafenda =

Frico Kafenda (October 2, 1883 – September 3, 1963) was a Slovak composer, and a musical pedagogue. His piano students included a famous composer Eugen Suchoň.

Kafenda was born in Mosóc (present-day Mošovce). Following his studies he worked in Germany as a conductor, but returned to Slovakia after World War I. He attempted to compose Slovak national opera, but due to the advent of World War II his work remained unfinished. He died in Bratislava.

== Gallery ==
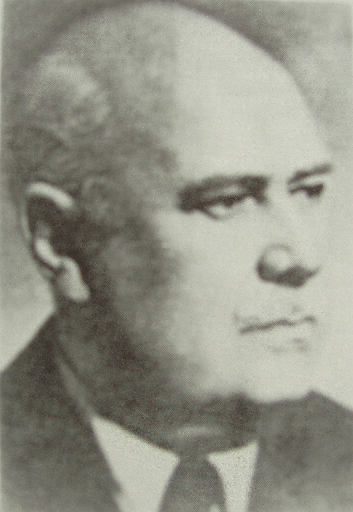
Frico Kafenda

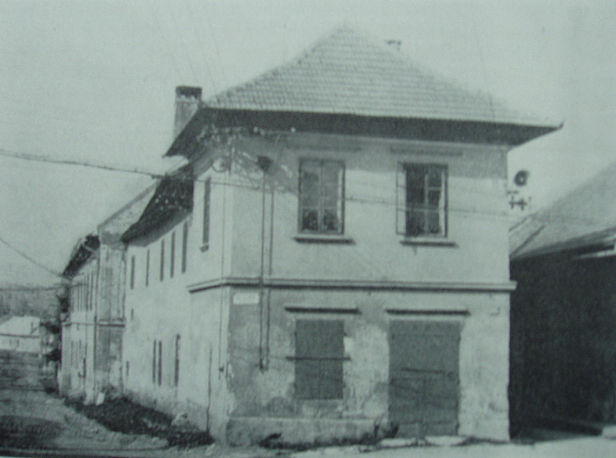
The birth-house of Frico Kafendo - demolished
