= Anna Lacková-Zora =

Slovak writer

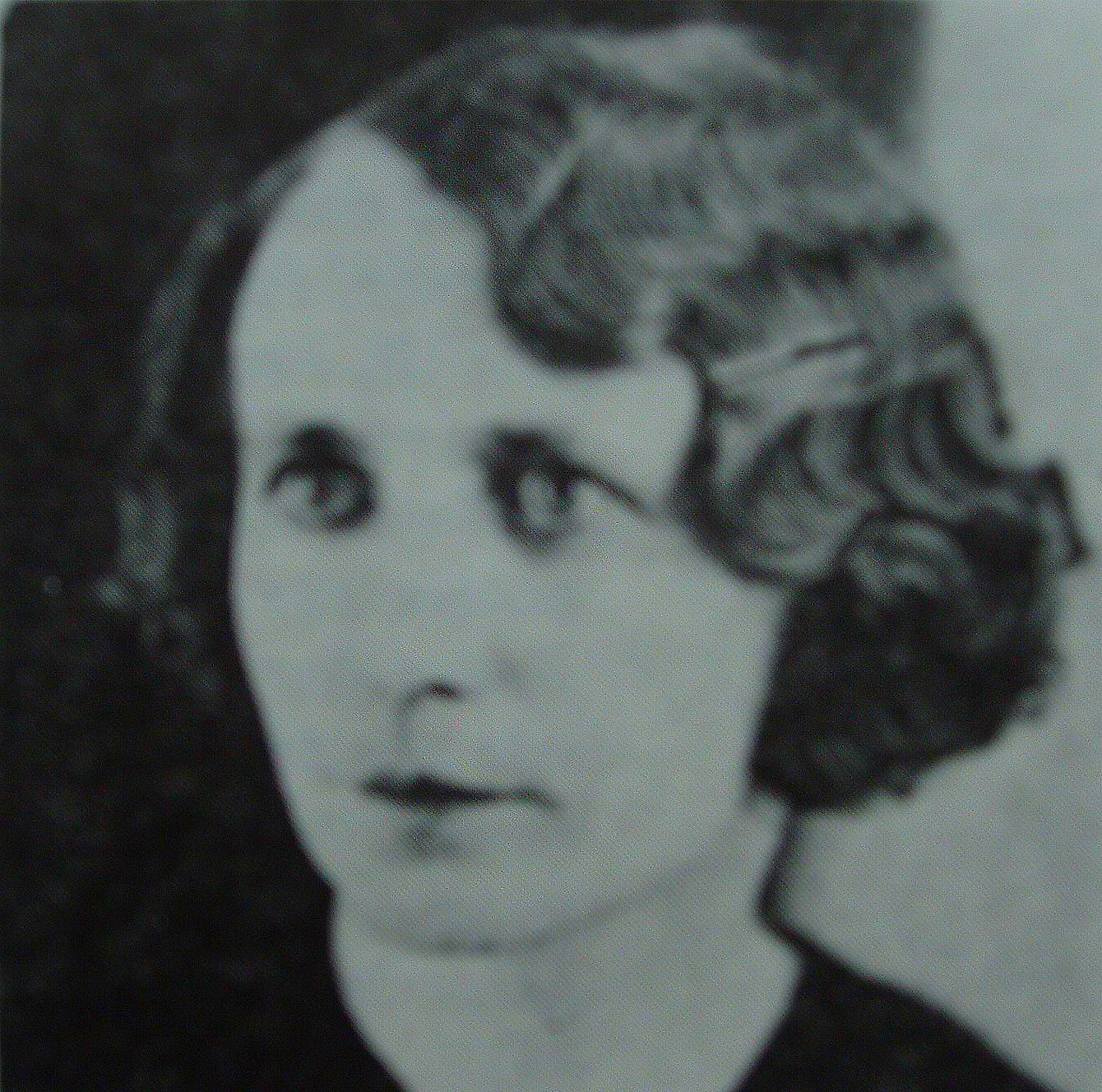
- Slovak poet, writer and playwright
- Born: Anna Domková; 7 August 1899; Mosóc, Kingdom of Hungary (today Mošovce, Slovakia)
- Died: 8 September 1988; Myjava, Czechoslovakia

Anna Lacková-Zora (born Anna Domková; 7 August 1899 – 8 September 1988) was a Slovak author. She published under the pseudonyms of Zora-Lacková, aunt Zora, Zora and Lacková-Zora. She was born in Mosóc (present-day Mošovce). At first, she worked as a bank clerk, but then fully devoted herself to her literary work, which she began during World War I.

After her first collection of poems (Jarné spevy) she wrote novellas and novels on topics concerning women (Myšacia bundička, Pútnice idú žitím). In her historical prose (Anička Jurkovičová, Z čirej lásky) Lacková-Zora captured the movement around Ľudovít Štúr in Slovak and in an interslavic context. She died in Myjava.

== Gallery ==
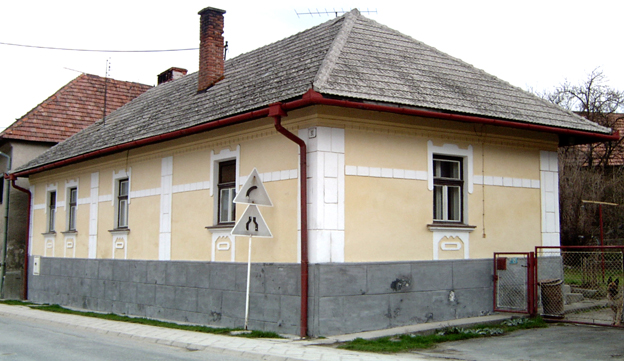
The house in Mošovce where Anna Lacková-Zora grew up.
