= Mošovce =

- Municipality
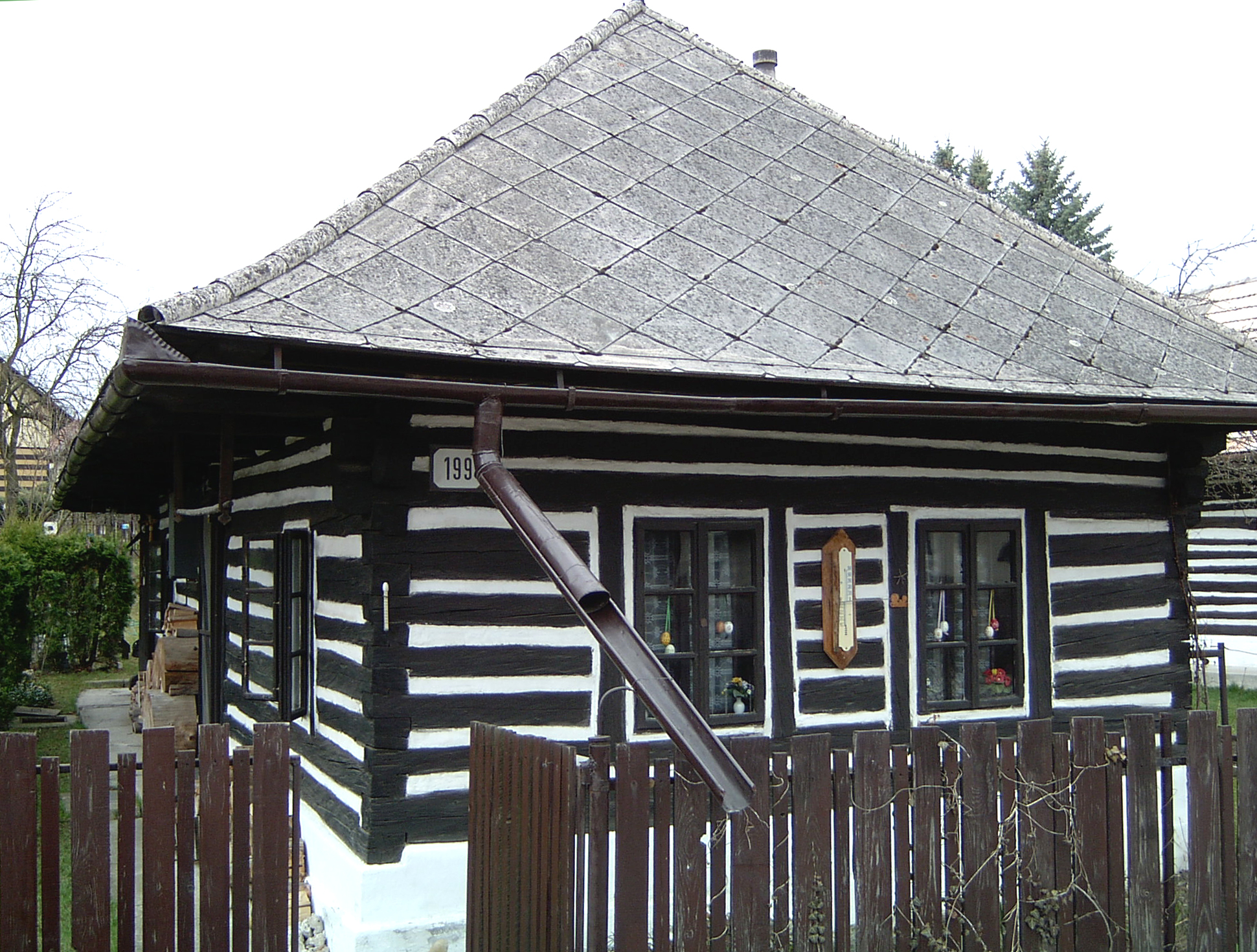
- The original folk architecture of Mošovce

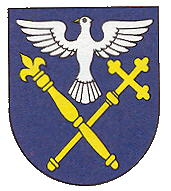
- Flag Coat of arms

- Location of Mošovce in the Žilina Region Location of Mošovce in Slovakia
- Coordinates: 48.92°N 18.87°E
- Country: Slovakia
- Region: Žilina Region
- District: Turčianske Teplice District
- First mentioned: 1252

Government
  - Mayor: Ing. Elena Krajčová

Area
  - Total: 57.97 km^{2} (22.38 sq mi)
- Elevation: 484 m (1,588 ft)

Population (2025)
  - Total: 1,364
- Time zone: UTC+1 (CET)
  - Summer (DST): UTC+2 (CEST)
- Postal code: 382 1
- Area code: +421 43
- Vehicle registration plate (until 2022): RK
- Website: www.mosovce.sk

Mošovce (Hungarian: Mosóc, German: Moschotz) is one of the largest villages in the historical region of Turiec, currently in the Turčianske Teplice District in the Žilina Region of northern Slovakia.

== History ==
Many preserved historical buildings are the evidence of the 770 years of its existence. It was mentioned for the first time in 1233 in the deed of donation by King Andrew II. Originally, Mošovce was made up of two settlements: The first one, Machyuch, was located in the area of today’s Starý Rad, and the second one, Terra Moys, which gave the village its current name, occupied the place of the present day Vidrmoch. And it is the name of the second settlement meaning The Land of Mojš, which makes us believe that the whole village once belonged to certain Mr. Mojš, whose name might have been an abbreviation of a compound Slavic name Mojtech, similar to the names Vojtech or Mojmír. Throughout history the name of the village has undergone many variations ranging from Mossovych, Mosocz, Mossowecz, villa regia Mayos alio nomine Mossovych, oppidioum Mayus sue Mosocz, Mosocz olim Mayus to the present-day Mošovce. The name of a separate ancient part of Mošovce, a former settlement Chornukov, has been preserved in the modern form of Čerňakov. Yet another part of the village bears the name of Mazan.

Mošovce first developed as a royal settlement with a free advocacy, and from the middle the 14th century as a privileged town subjected to the royal castle of Blatnica. In 1527 it fell into the hands of the Révay family, who suppressed the town privileges of Mošovce for almost 400 years.

In the past, Mošovce was an important craft center of the Turiec region. Crafts experienced a surprising expansion, and there were around 15 guilds active in the town; the bootmaker and the most famous furrier guild were the ones to survive for the longest time. Before the establishment of independent Czechoslovakia in 1918, Mošovce was part of Turóc County within the Kingdom of Hungary. From 1939 to 1945, it was part of the Slovak Republic. The present-day Mošovce can be characterized as an important tourist area with many sights.

== Geography ==
The municipality lies at an altitude of 484 metres (1,588 ft) and covers an area of 57.97 km^{2} (22.38 sq mi) (2025).

The surroundings of Mošovce feature historic tree avenues and groves that connect to the woodland of Veľká Fatra Mountains, which include the peaks of Tlstá, Ostrá, and Drienok. The region contains limestone and dolomite rock formations, as well as the nearby Blatnická and Gaderská Valleys.

A stream called Mošovka flows through Mošovce, and is divided into two distributaries: the main stream, and the so-called Upper Stream, which was in the past used to propel the mill.

The northern part of the town, next to its part Čerňakov, hosts a system of ponds fed by the Čierna Voda stream. Originally the ponds belonged to the Révay manor, while today they are used predominantly for breeding trout.

== Sights ==
One of the most remarkable monuments is a Rococo-Classical Manor House from the 2nd half of the 18th century with an extensive English park. Other sites in the town include: The birthplace of Ján Kollár, a Neo-Gothic Catholic church with a valuable altar built on the spot of its ancient predecessor, a Lutheran church built in 1784, a Mausoleum now hosting the Museum of Crafts, an Art-Nouveau greenhouse, and a garden pavilion from 1800.

== Population ==
Population statistic (10 years)
Year	1995	2005	2015	2025
Count	1356	1337	1322	1364
Difference		−1.40%	−1.12%	+3.17%

Population statistic
Year	2024	2025
Count	1342	1364
Difference		+1.63%

It has a population of 1364 people (31 December 2025).

=== Ethnicity ===
Census 2021 (1+%)
Ethnicity	Number	Fraction
Slovak	1328	97.86%
Not found out	19	1.4%
Czech	17	1.25%
Total	1357	

In year 2021 was 1357 people by ethnicity 1328 as Slovak, 19 as Not found out, 17 as Czech, 5 as Other, 4 as Russian, 3 as Rusyn, 2 as Ukrainian, 2 as Hungarian, 1 as Romani and 1 as German.

Note on population: The difference values of population numbers in the table "Population statistic" and in the sections "Ethnicity" & "Religion" is caused by the use of various statistical methods.

=== Religion ===
Census 2021 (1+%)
Religion	Number	Fraction
Evangelical Church	585	43.11%
None	370	27.27%
Roman Catholic Church	339	24.98%
Not found out	29	2.14%
Greek Catholic Church	17	1.25%
Total	1357	

In year 2021 was 1357 people by religion 585 from Evangelical Church, 370 from None, 339 from Roman Catholic Church, 29 from Not found out, 17 from Greek Catholic Church, 3 from Old Catholic Church, 3 from Ad hoc movements, 2 from Other and not ascertained christian church, 2 from Jehovah's Witnesses, 2 from Other, 1 from Eastern Orthodox Church, 1 from Hinduism, 1 from United Methodist Church, 1 from Buddhism and 1 from Apostolic Church.

According to the 2001 census, the municipality had 1,380 inhabitants, confirming a slight 4,7% decrease of the town population in the last 7 years. 98.62% of inhabitants were Slovaks, 0.72% Czechs and 0.14% Hungarian. The religious make-up was 54.78% Lutherans, 30.36% Roman Catholics and 12.97% people with no religious affiliation.

== Notable residents ==
Mošovce has produced several notable personalities, including Frico Kafenda (1883–1963), composer and pedagogue; Anna Lacková-Zora (1899–1988), writer; Štefan Krčméry (1892–1955), literary critic, historian, and poet; Jur Tesák Mošovský, Baroque playwright, church dignitary, and a religious writer, whose works belong to the period of Humanism; Miloslav Schmidt, the founder of the amateur fire brigades in Slovakia; and Alexander Horváth, a successful footballer.

However, the most well known person born in Mošovce is likely the Slavic poet, philosopher, and Lutheran preacher, Ján Kollár (1793–1852), who greatly influenced the literature of at least two nations with his poetic composition Slávy Dcera. His work is often cited as the basis and motive for contemporary patriots and national activists. It has been translated into various Slavic, as well as non-Slavic languages.

Michal Miloslav Hodža, an important Slovak national revivalist, Lutheran pastor, poet, and linguist studied in Mošovce.

== Daily life ==
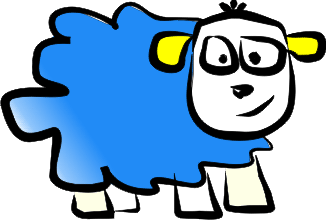
The Mascot of Mošovce

The village hosts the Associated School of Farming and Fishery, which belongs to only a few of its kind in Central Europe. As for annual events, the traditional Michael's Mošovce Fair, which takes place in early October, is one of the largest fairs in Slovakia. In addition to the New Year's fireworks and a classical Maypole celebrations, another event worth mentioning is a Fire Brigade ball organized during the Carnival period and connected to a Mask March. In the past, until the beginning of the 1990s, a half-marathon with the name of The SNP Run was held in the town annually. In addition to that, at the end of August Mošovce becomes the site of the ŠRZ Drienok Cup Volleyball tournament - the largest amateur volleyball tournament in Slovakia, founded in 1977, with the participation of around 90 teams. At the same time, a solemn wreath-laying takes place under the Slovak National Uprising monument.

== Town economy ==
Until the beginning of the 1990s the town had a hide-processing factory together with the connecting fur-processing industry. Later the inhabitants changed focus to provision of tourist services (local thermal springs and nature are used), food industry (baking facilities), construction field (production of concrete prefabricates, house kits, as well as traditional construction industry) and fishery (Mošovce ponds). Agriculture still keeps its importance, with an increasing significance of forestry.

It is, however, necessary to emphasize, that the town's function is still predominantly residential and the majority of economically active inhabitants commute to the nearby Turčianske Teplice or Martin.

== Twin towns ==
Mošovce is twinned with:

- Dwikozy, Poland
- Kozy, Poland
- Lalić (Odžaci), Serbia

== Gallery ==
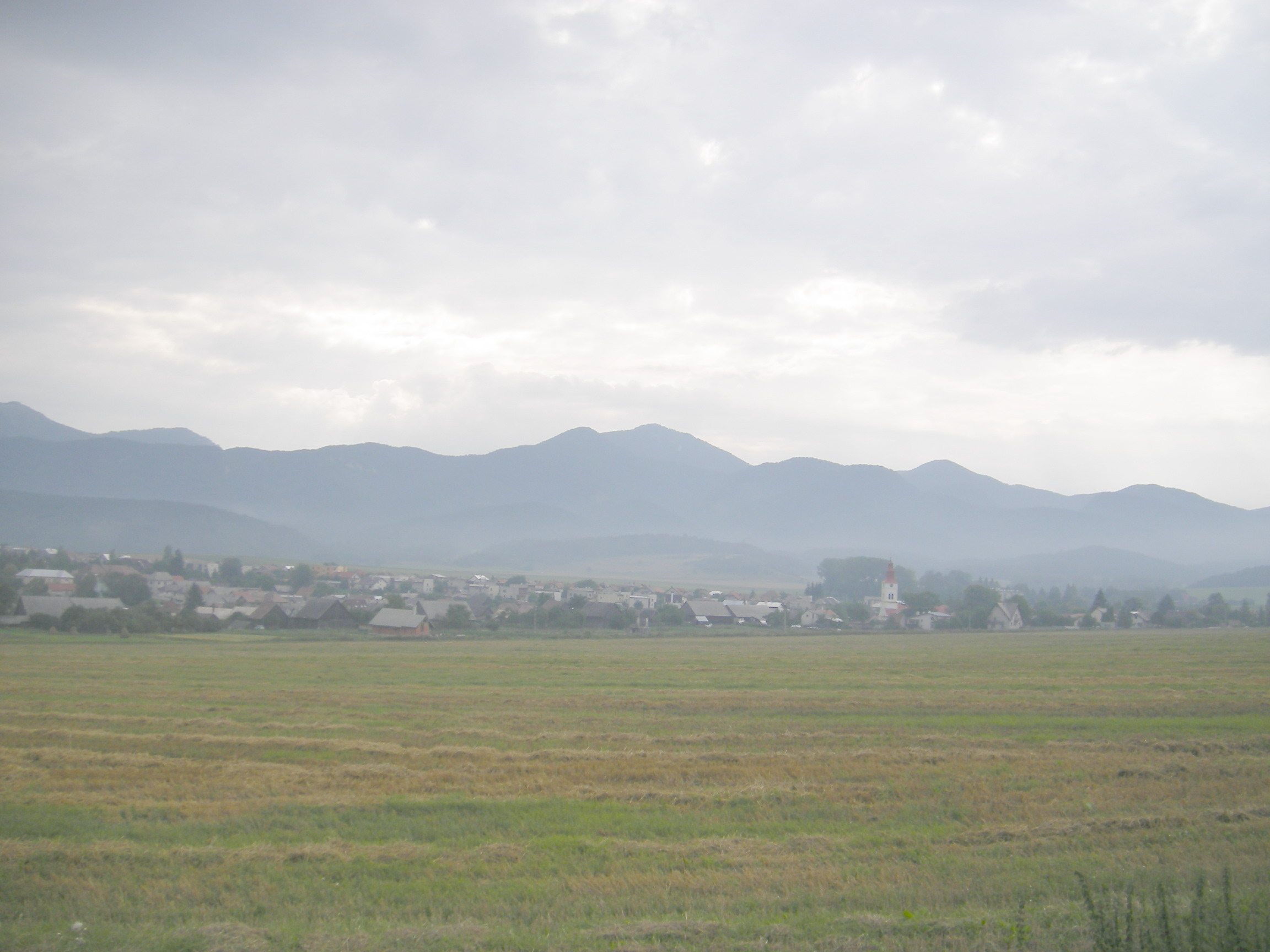
Panorama of Mošovce

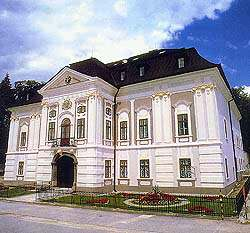
Rococo-Classical Manor House in Mošovce

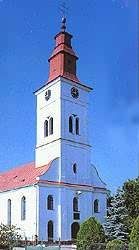
Lutheran Church in Mošovce

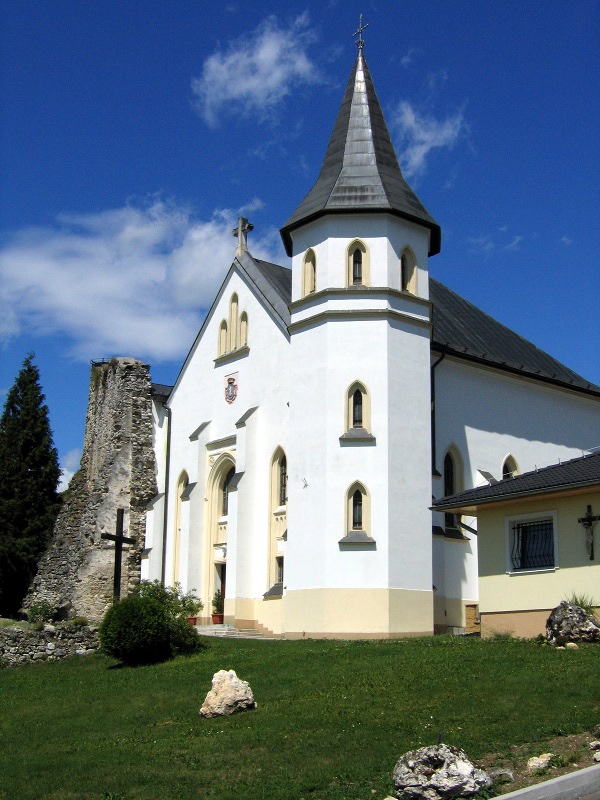
Roman Catholic Church in Mošovce

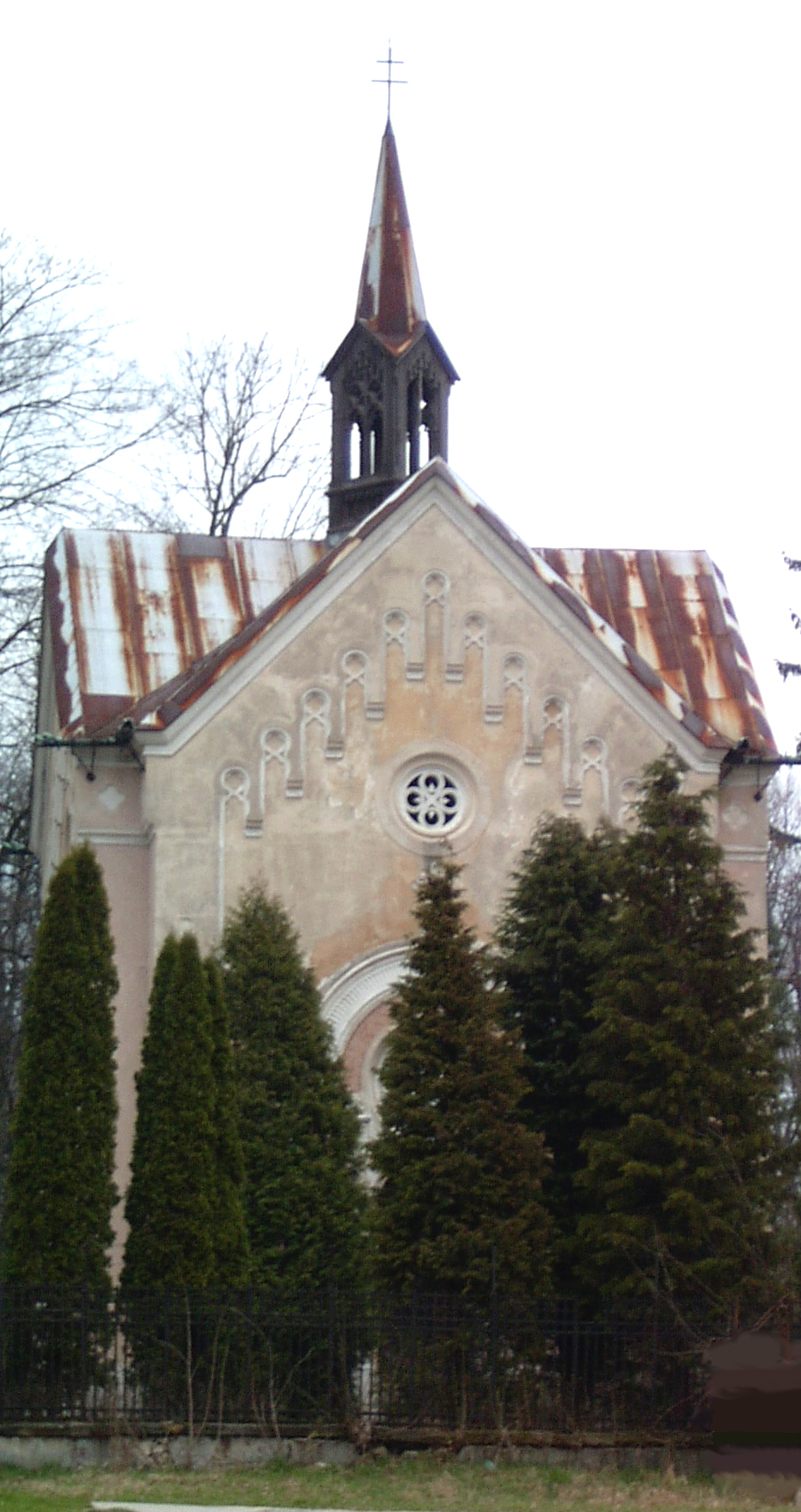
Neo-Gothic Roman Catholic chapel, later mausoleum, now a museum in Mošovce

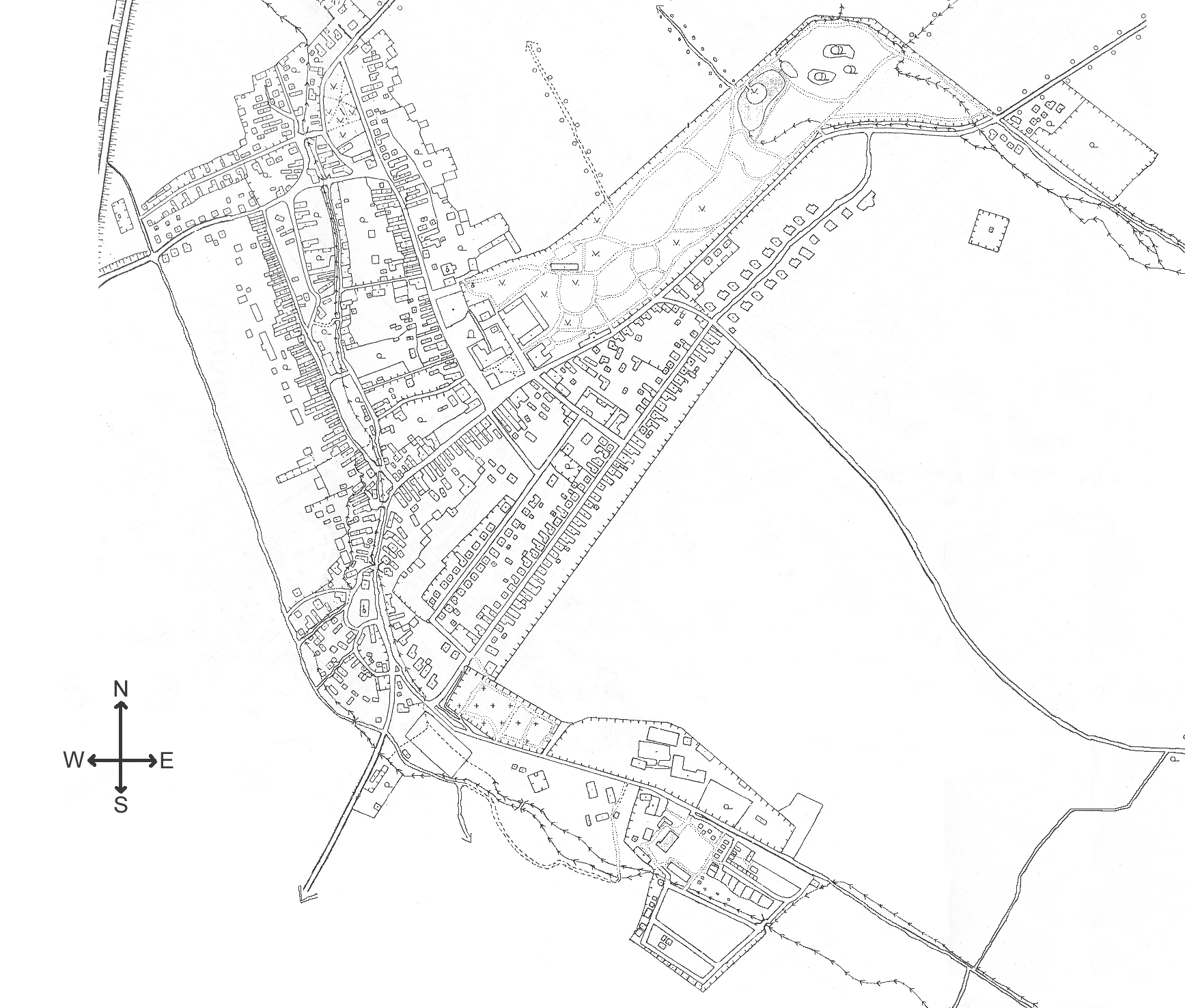
Map of Mošovce

== See also ==
- Révay
- Manor House in Mošovce
- Mošovce Park
- Church of Holy Trinity in Mošovce
- Lutheran Church in Mošovce
- Neogothic chapel in Mošovce
