= Lalić, Serbia =

Lalić Лалић (Serbian) Laliť (Slovak) Liliomos (Hungarian)
- Village (Selo)
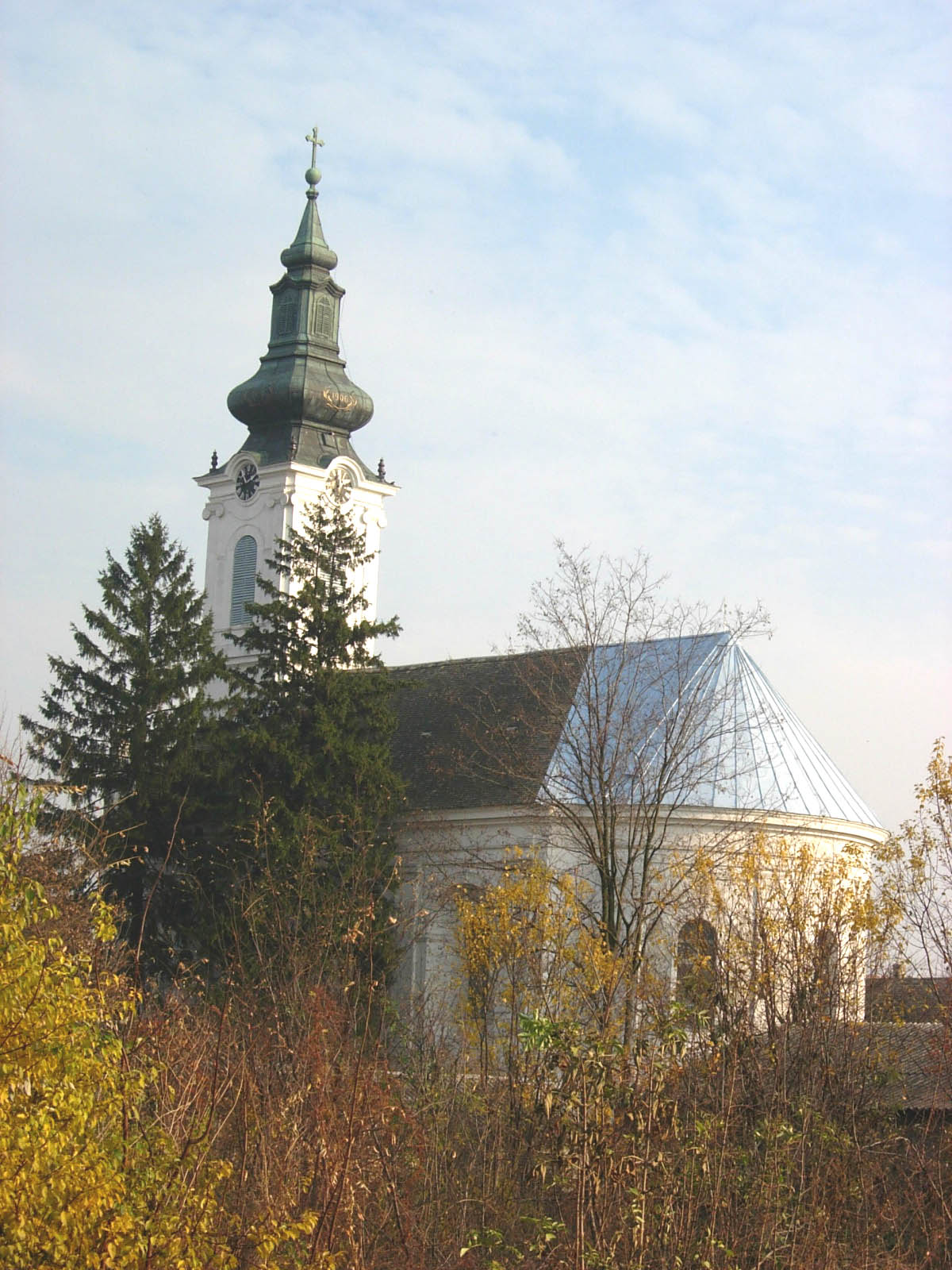
- The Lutheran (Slovak) church

- Location within Vojvodina Location within Serbia Location within Europe
- Coordinates: 45°31′N 19°22′E
- Country: Serbia
- Province: Vojvodina
- Region: Bačka
- District: West Bačka
- Municipality: Odžaci
- Local community: Lalić

Population (2022)
  - Total: 1,085
- Time zone: UTC+1 (CET)
  - Summer (DST): UTC+2 (CEST)

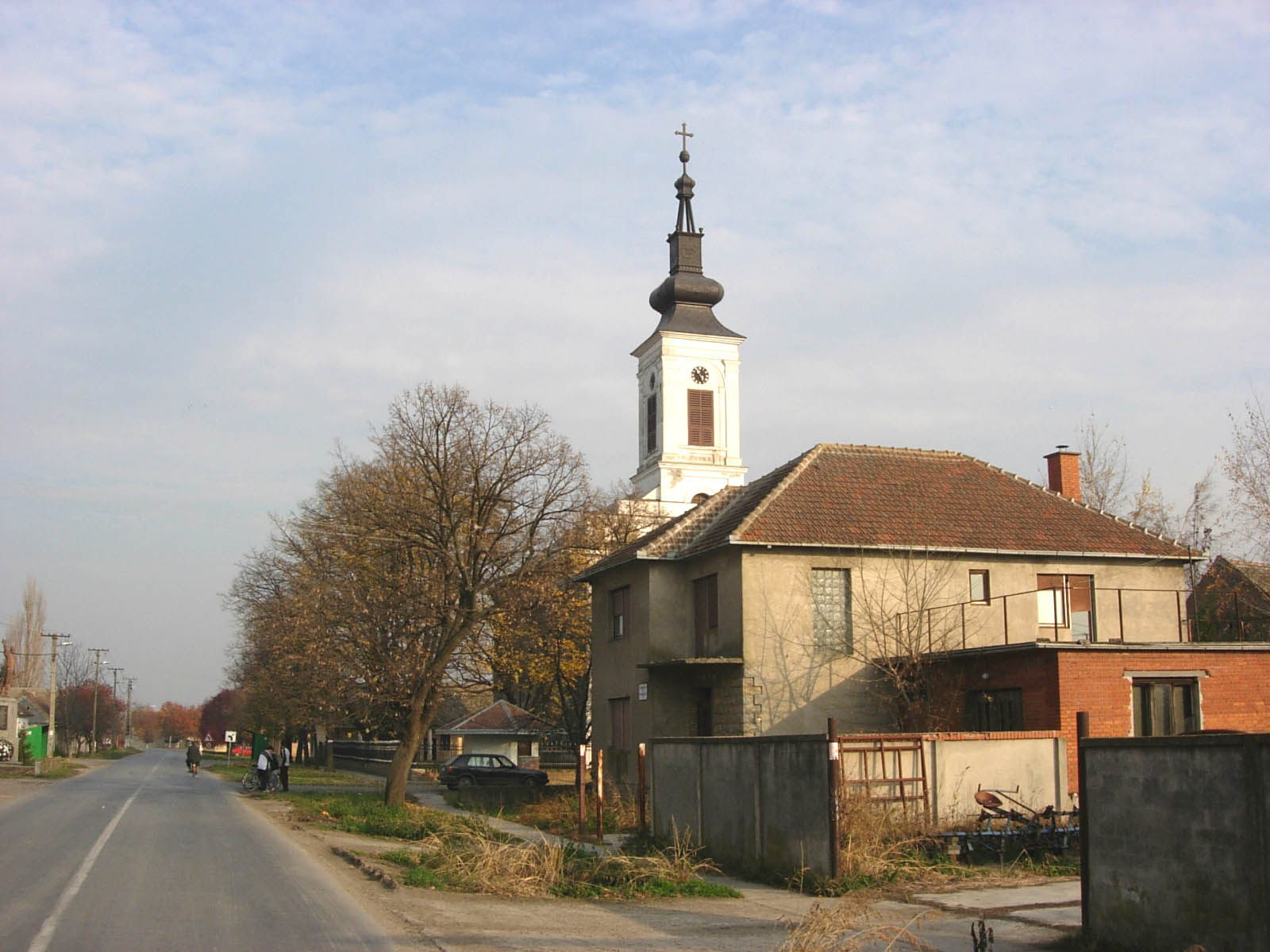
The Orthodox church.

Lalić (Serbian Cyrillic: Лалић; Slovak: Laliť, Pannonian Rusyn: Лалить) is a village in the Odžaci municipality, West Bačka District, Vojvodina, Serbia. The village has a population of 1,085 people (2022 census). Its twin town is Mošovce (Slovakia).

== Demographics ==
=== Historical population ===
- 1961: 2,352
- 1971: 2,125
- 1981: 1,859
- 1991: 1,699
- 2002: 1,646
- 2011: 1,323
- 2022: 1,085

=== Ethnic groups ===
According to data from the 2022 census, ethnic groups in the village include:

- 487 (44.9%) Slovaks
- 466 (42.9%) Serbs
- Others/Undeclared/Unknown

== See also ==
- List of places in Serbia
- List of cities, towns and villages in Vojvodina
