= Manor House in Mošovce =

Coordinates: 48.9099°N 18.8889°E

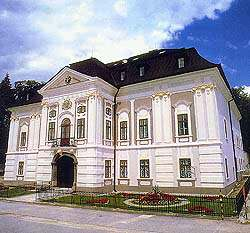
Rococo-classical manor house in Mošovce

The Manor House in Mošovce is a manor house in the Turiec region of Slovakia. It is considered a historical monument and is of the Révay Rococo-Classical style of architecture. It was built in the second half of the 18th century.

== New manor house ==
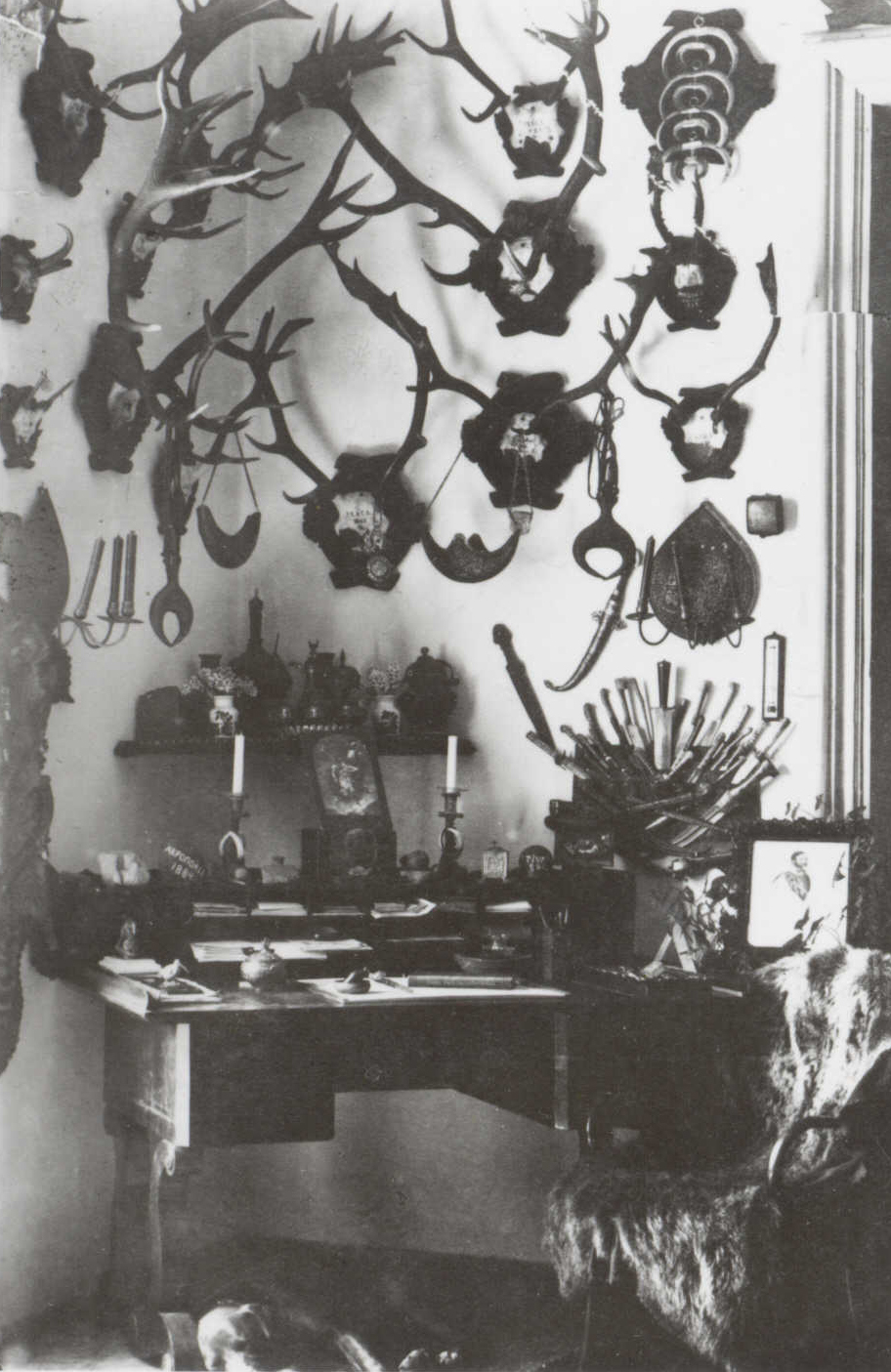
Interior of the manor house

The manor house had originally two stories, with a rectangular ground-plan. The building has a block character, and is situated at the edge of an extensive park. Its frontal façade creates the border of the square. Considering the usage of space, the entrance parts of the ground floor are conceived in a rather grandiose style. Other rooms are connected to the entrance corridor. Cellars are built under a part of the object with a 9 meter deep well located in the basement. A wide, wooden staircase provides access to the first floor. The rooms in the ground-floor have simple arches without any distinct ornaments. The only exception is the so-called „writing-room“, with a plastic motive on the ceiling, corresponding with its purpose: a sealed envelope with four hearts. According to the legend, this is where the countess’s love letters were written. Most rooms on the first floor have straight ceilings. A representative character can be observed in a room with a rococo-classical furnace. Inside one can find original doors and rococo-classical forged rails at the ground-floor windows.

After 1945 the manor house served as a school: At first it was used as a state Children’s Home for Orphans of the war, with the agricultural buildings serving as a kindergarten. Later it was turned into a special boarding school, and after that the building hosted the Vocational School of Agriculture. In the first half of the 1990s, the object was sold by the town hall to the Slovak Film Studios in Bratislava, which renovated the building and used it for recreational purposes.

At night on 14 February 1963, burning ashes in one of the chimneys ignited the shingle roof of the manor house, made of larch. In spite of the efforts of fire brigades, the flames soared 20 meters high and people in the entire village were able to read the newspaper in the light. The entire roof burned down during the blaze, which caused 160,000 Kčs, worth of damage. The building was later restored.

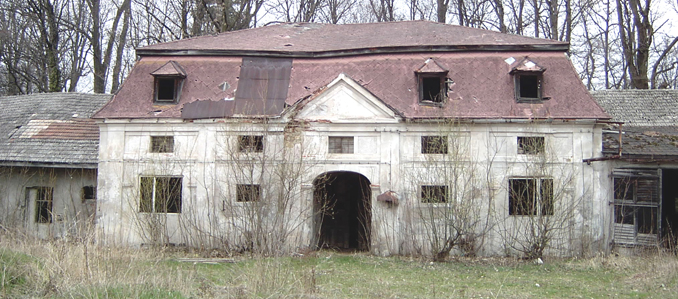
Agricultural buildings

In the past years the interior was used several times by movie-makers. The last shootings were the ones of a saga of zemans of Turiec called, Alžbetin Dvor. After yet another reconstruction and adaptation in the late 20th century, and in the early years of the 21st century, the manor house started serving as a hotel. Today it is again being prepared for the visitors of Mošovce.

The area adjacent to the manor house was used for agricultural buildings from the first half of the 19th century, and are a large U shape. Originally they served as garages for carriages, and later for cars of Count Révay. After World War II they became the home of agricultural vehicles of the local cooperative. The agricultural buildings were demolished in 2005.

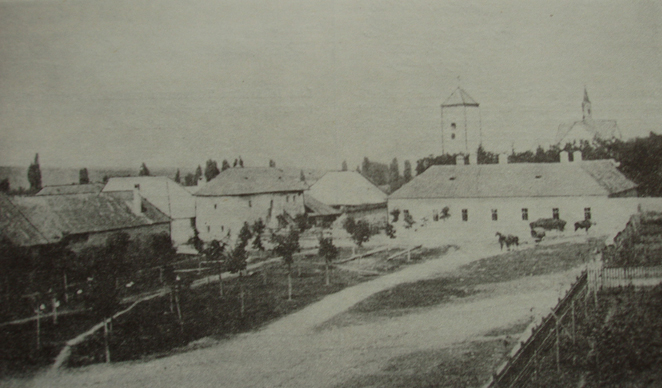
Old manor house in Mošovce

== Old manor house ==
The old manor house, which was situated in the northern part of the extensive square, was torn down in 1952. When and how it was built, or who was its creator is unknown. It is probable that it was very old, because when it was destroyed by fire in 1760, Baron Jozef Révay didn’t restore it, but rather decided to build a new one. It is said, that when the Révays had their new manor house built, they had the first floor of their old residence dismantled, because supposedly they believed that the servants didn’t deserve to live in the noblemen’s chambers.

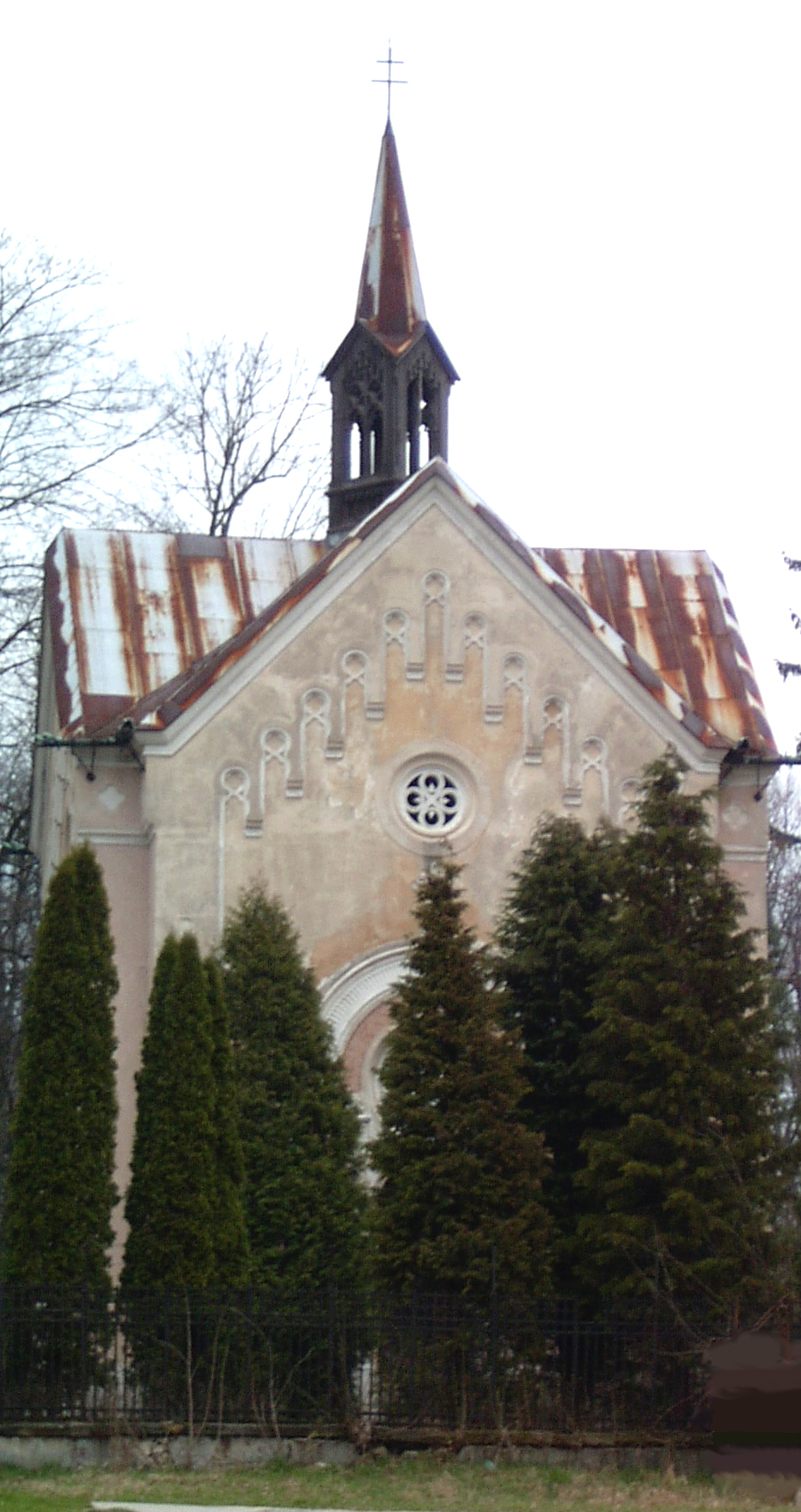
Neogothic chapel

== Old zeman mansion ==
A long time ago there was another family of noblemen living in Mošovce in addition to the Révays – the zeman family of Rakšánsky. In the 15th century their old mansion was probably already standing at the place of today’s supermarket. At the end of the 19th century a Jewish school was located in the building. Its last owners at the beginning of the 20th century were the Révays, who didn’t need the mansion anymore, had it demolished, and turned the ground into vegetable gardens for their servants.

== Manor house park ==
Especially notable is the English park, which has been an inseparable part of Mošovce since mid 18th century, and currently belongs to the largest parks in central Slovakia. It features a Neogothic chapel, a garden pavilion and a former Art Nouveau greenhouse.

== See also ==
- Mošovce
- Révay
