= Lutheran Church in Mošovce =

Church in Mošovce, Slovakia

Coordinates: 48°54′21″N 18°53′05″E

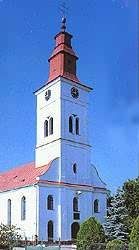
Lutheran Church in Mošovce

The Lutheran Church in Mošovce (Slovakia) belongs to the Augsburg Denomination of the Lutheran Church and was built in 1864 – 1871 after the acquisition of religious freedoms in the contemporary Hungary, allowing Lutheran parishioners to construct their own church with a tower. This was done in the place of an original church from 1783, which was smaller and had no tower.

== Description ==
The church is a rectangular building, reconstructed in 1927, specific for its simple classical expression and a portal under the tower. The tower with a four-faced (functional) clock is terminated with a high roof. From three sides, the interior of the church is lined with a choir, resting on columns. The entrance area is adorned by an oil painting of Mošovce from the 19th century and the main nave hosts a painting depicting the Last Supper. The church's furnishings include an electrical organ, glass chandeliers and an altar with a pulpit. The rear part of the church contains 3 pronouncedly vertically elongated arch painted-glasswindows depicting biblical motives. Between 1973 – 1975 a general reconstruction of the church was performed, allowing for the exchange of the benches, windows, choirs, as well as the altar and pulpit. Following reconstructions of the outer facade took place at the beginning of the 1990s and thereafter at around 2005. The reason for the relatively frequent reconstructions was the material used for the construction of the church, containing substances constantly penetrating the plaster up to its surface and degrading it strongly. In the past, damage was visible especially during humid weather. After the last reconstruction, the condition of the church seems to be stable.

== Bells ==
The tower's belfry hosts three church bells of various size. In addition to their basic purpose, calling church-members for service, the bells fulfill yet another function by announcing the death of the town residents according to the following formula:

- a period of tolling on a single bell followed by a pause - all repeated twice: death of a woman
- a period of tolling on a single bell followed by a pause - all repeated three times: death of a man
- these periods, called the pulsing are followed by the tolling of all three bells.
- the above formula is used on the day, when the person in question had died. Thereafter, every day until the funeral, all three bells are tolled at a given hour.
- similarly, all the bells toll at one year's anniversary of a person's death.
- originally, the size of the tolling bell was selected according to the age of the deceased: the smallest one in case of the death of a child, the middle one upon the passing of an adult, and the largest one when the deceased was an elderly - today, this tradition is no longer observed.

Originally, until the beginning of the 1990s, the bells also announced the time using chimes of the smallest bell:

- 1 chime : quarter past
- 2 chimes: half past
- 3 chimes: quarter to
- 4 chimes: whole hour; whereas after a short pause followed another series of chimes corresoding to the current hour
- tolling of all bells also marked the morning at 6:00 a.m., the noon at 12:00 p.m. and night at 18:00 p.m.

== See also ==
- Church of Holy Trinity in Mošovce
- Mošovce

== Sources ==
- LIPPAN, M. a kol.: Mošovce. Banská Bystrica: Stredoslovenské vydavateľstvo, 1971. 405 pp.
- REŤKOVSKÝ, P.: Turistický sprievodca po mošovských pamätihodnostiach. Mošovce: Obecný úrad Mošovce, 2004. 36 pp., ISBN 80-969156-0-6
