= Révay family =

House of Révay
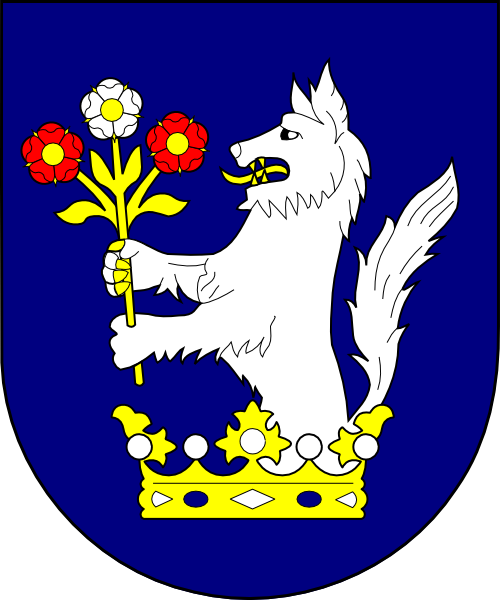
- Country: Kingdom of Hungary: Kingdom of Croatia; Turóc County
- Founded: early 13th century
- Founder: Jakab de Ryva
- Titles: Baron and Count Révay de Szklabina et Blatnicza
- Estates: Szklabinya, Blatnica, Mosóc
- Cadet branches: Révay de Trebosztó

The Révay family was a Hungarian noble lineage that held extensive estates in Turóc County of the Kingdom of Hungary (present-day Turiec region in Slovakia) until the early 20th century.

Their holdings included, among others, the Rococo-Classical manor house in Mošovce, the so-called Old Manor House (demolished in the mid-20th century), the Noblemen’s Mansion and park in Mošovce, a castle in Blatnica, estates and a castle in Sklabiňa, as well as a manor house with a park in Turčianska Štiavnička.

== Family history ==
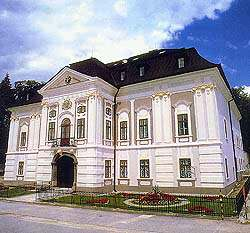
Rococo-classical Révay manor house in Mošovce

The Révay family has been known since the 13th century. The first known ancestor of the family was called Comes Jakab (Count Jakab) in the early 13th century. The main estates of the family were situated in the region of Syrmia until the Ottoman occupation of southern Hungary. In 1556 and 1635 the family was promoted to Barons and on 17 June 1723 to Counts. The coat of arms of the Masters de Reva, which can be seen at the façade of their manor house, is composed of a wolf Tenné growing from a crown of Or, holding three roses. Mošovce became the property of the Révay family in 1534, six years after the donation of the King of Hungary, Ferdinand I, Holy Roman Emperor. The last member of the family, who resided in Mošovce, was count Ferenc Révay. Today the descendants of the family live in Trnava, Bratislava, Graz as well as in Hungary. The last letter of the name is sometimes "i" instead of "y" in some printed versions or as an affair of modernization in the late 19th century Kingdom of Hungary.

After World War II, the property of the Révay family in Turiec was nationalized. In 1993, the niece of Ladislav Révay, the last of the counts, filed a request for the restitution of their property. The request ended up in court as the Révay family and the state had differing opinions as to the extent of their claim. In 2001 the restitution claim of the Révays was rejected by the Constitutional Court of the Slovak Republic. 5 years later, however, the European Court of Human Rights in Strasbourg issued a ruling allowing the matter to proceed, thus opening a possibility for a reconciliation of both parties. This resulted in a financial compensation of the state for the husband and wife of Ladislav Révay's niece (who died in 1995) in the amount of SKK 150 million (just under 5 million EUR).

In Sweden, the family is considered part of the unintroduced nobility.

== See also ==
- Peter Révay
- Church of Holy Trinity in Mošovce

== Gallery ==
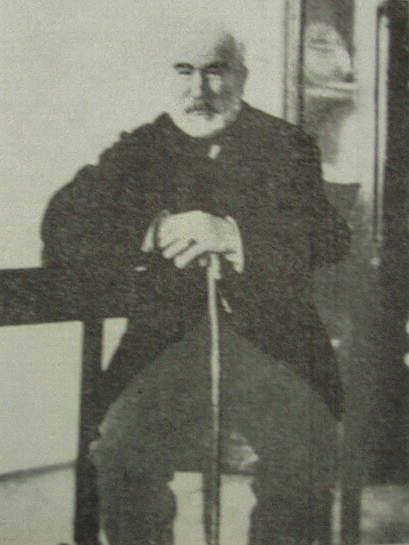
Count Ferenc Révay, the last member of the Révay family, who lived in Mošovce. Picture approx. from 1910.

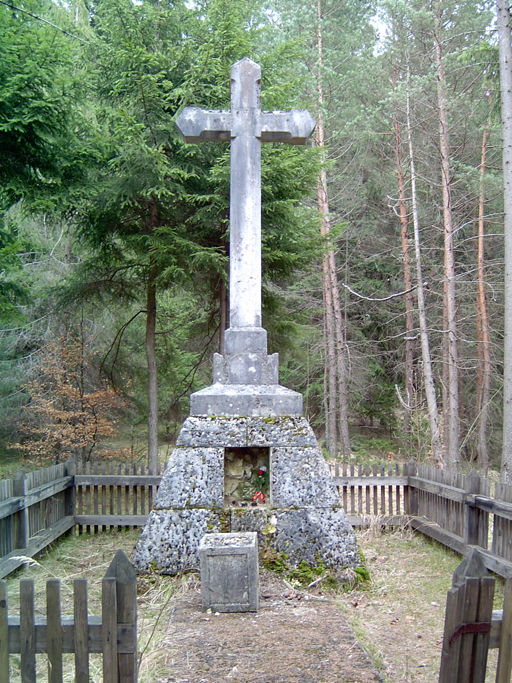
The grave of Count Ferenc Révay in the woods of Mošovce

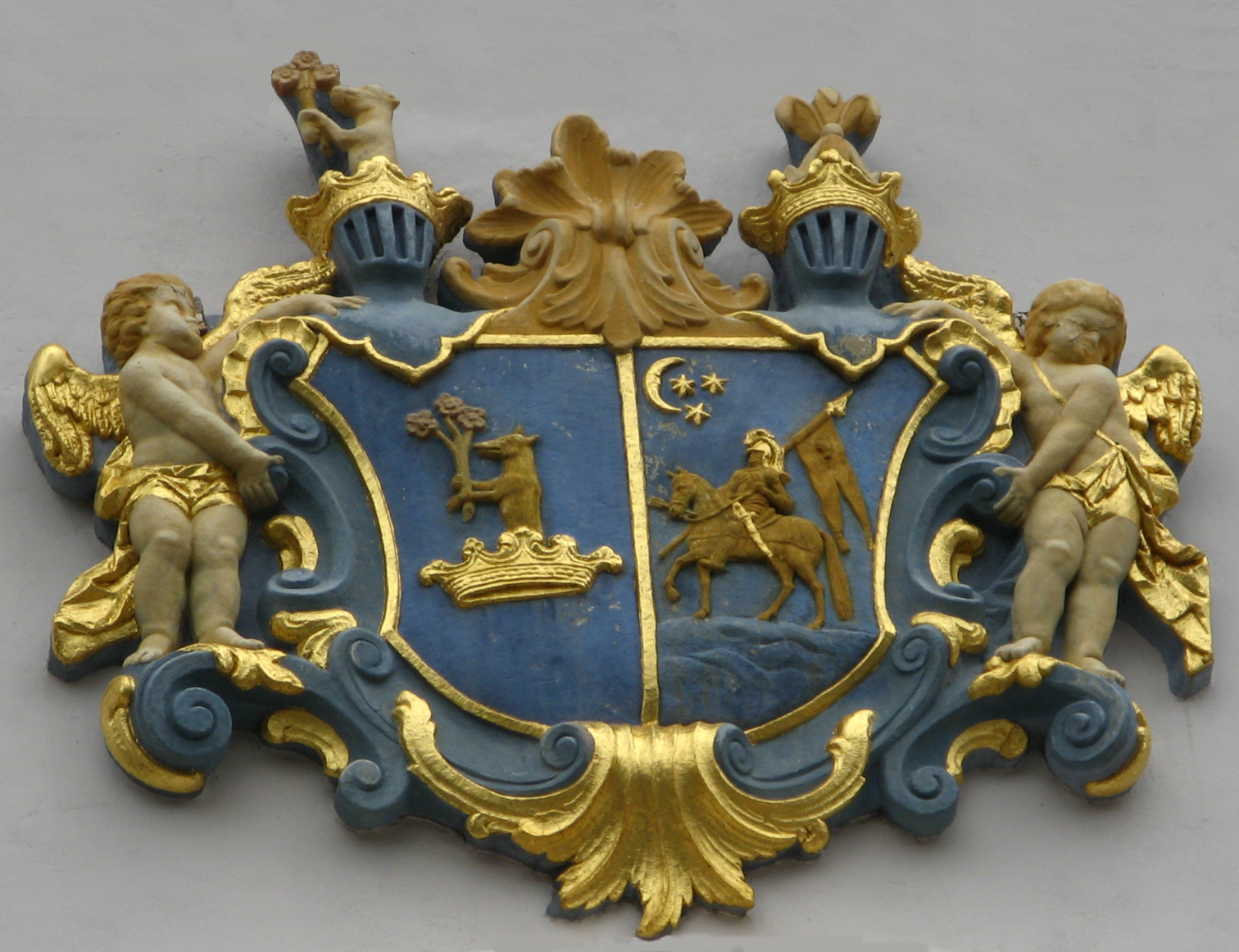
Coat of arms of the Révay (left) and Szunyogh families

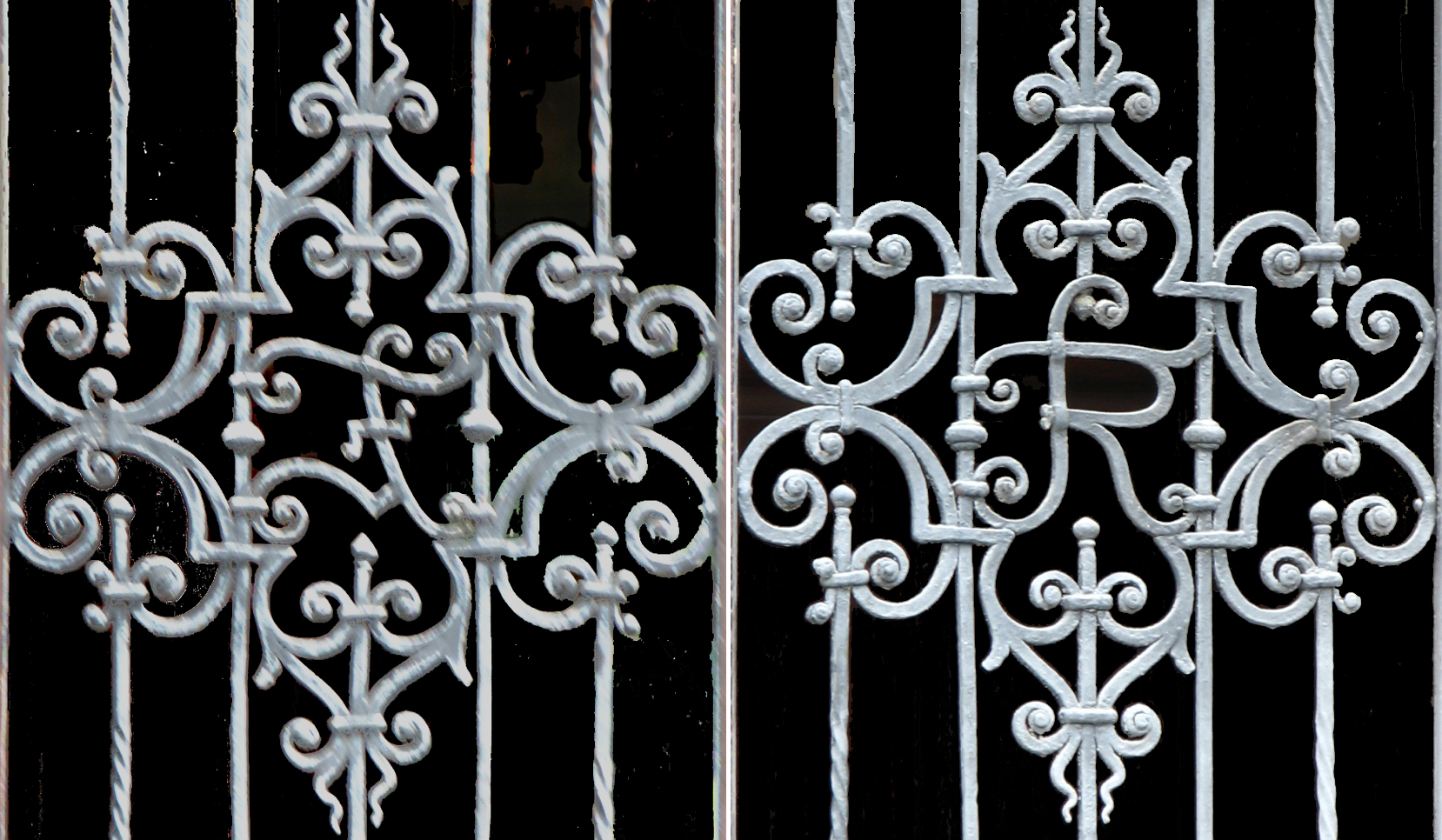
Initials of Count Ferenc Révay in the gate of the manor-house in Mošovce

== See also ==
- List of titled noble families in the Kingdom of Hungary
