= Sklabiňa =

- Municipality
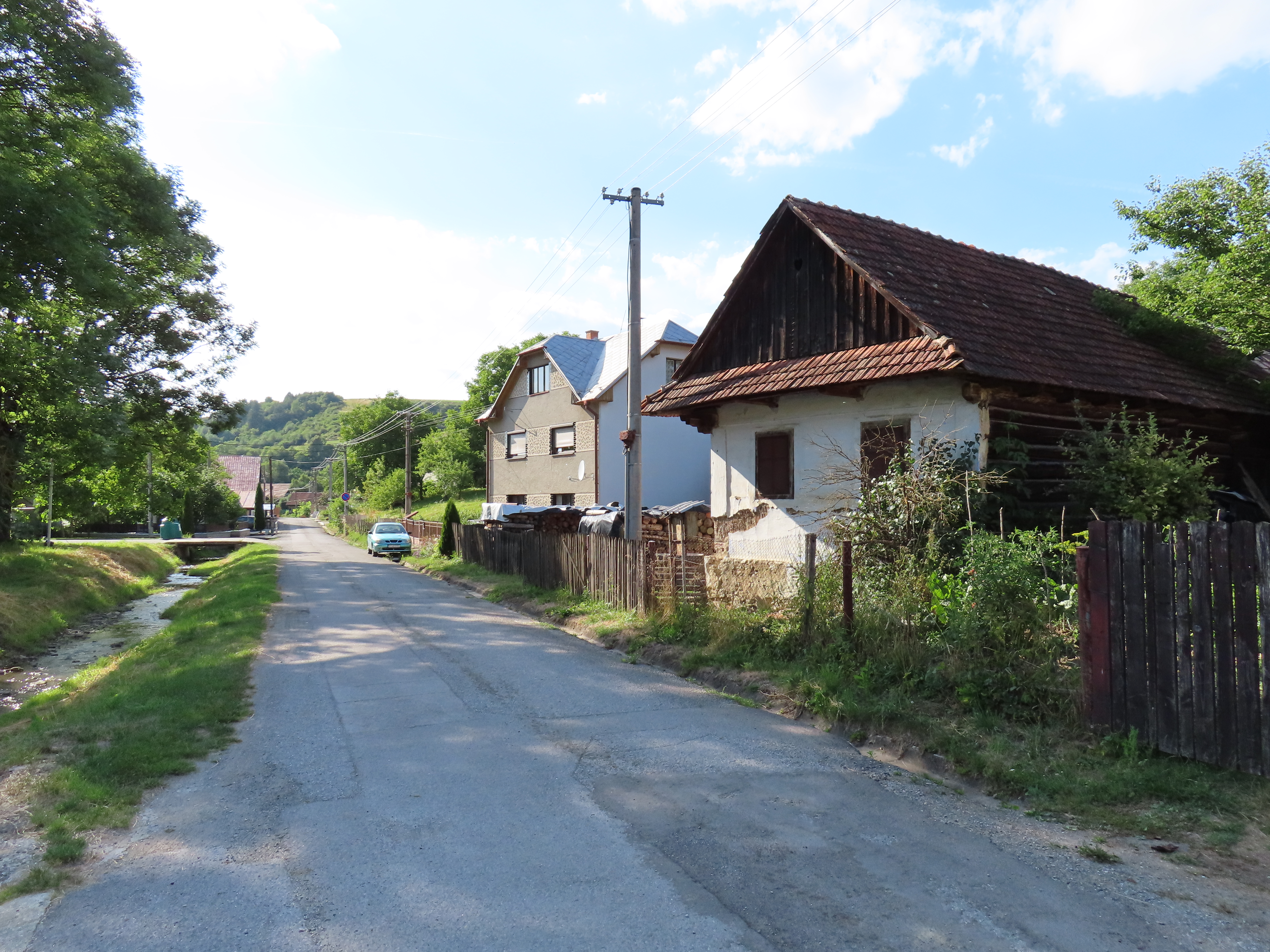

- Flag Coat of arms

- Location of Sklabiňa in the Žilina Region Location of Sklabiňa in Slovakia
- Coordinates: 49.05°N 19.02°E
- Country: Slovakia
- Region: Žilina Region
- District: Martin District
- First mentioned: 1242

Area
  - Total: 11.06 km^{2} (4.27 sq mi)
- Elevation: 484 m (1,588 ft)

Population (2025)
  - Total: 646
- Time zone: UTC+1 (CET)
  - Summer (DST): UTC+2 (CEST)
- Postal code: 380 3
- Area code: +421 43
- Vehicle registration plate (until 2022): MT
- Website: www.obecsklabina.sk

Sklabiňa (Hungarian: Szklabinya) is a village and municipality in Martin District in the Žilina Region of northern Slovakia.

== Names ==
The name is derived from the word Sclavus, Sclabus (Slav). In historical records the village was first mentioned in 1242 - Zklabonya, later as Sclabonya (1252), Sclouuan (Slovan - the native name of Slavs, 1266), Sclabana (1309) but also as Szklabinka (1736) or in the Hungarized form Szklabinya (1786).

== History ==
The locality was settled already by the people of Púchov culture who built a hillfort near the present-day village. The remains of the hillfort were reused in the Early Middle Ages by the Slavs. The village has always had a close relationship to the Sklabiňa Castle, the seat of Turóc County. Before the establishment of independent Czechoslovakia in 1918, the village was part of Turóc County within the Kingdom of Hungary. From 1939 to 1945, it was part of the Slovak Republic.

During the World War II the village became the center of the partisan movement. On 21 August 1944 (one week before the Slovak National Uprising), Sklabiňa became the first village where the partisans raised the Czechoslovak flag and declared that it is a liberated territory of Czechoslovakia. The partisan field trial executed at least 100 people, mostly members of the German minority. The village suffered from several punitive expeditions. Among other, on 30 September 1944 Nazis imprisoned 144 citizens, 3 of them died during the questioning, additional 20 were executed together with other prisoners.

== Geography ==
The municipality lies at an altitude of 484 metres (1,588 ft) and covers an area of 11.06 km^{2} (4.27 sq mi) (2025).

== Population ==
Population statistic (10 years)
Year	1995	2005	2015	2025
Count	596	606	632	646
Difference		+1.67%	+4.29%	+2.21%

Population statistic
Year	2024	2025
Count	644	646
Difference		+0.31%

It has a population of 646 people (31 December 2025).

=== Ethnicity ===
Census 2021 (1+ %)
Ethnicity	Number	Fraction
Slovak	607	94.1%
Not found out	33	5.11%
Other	7	1.08%
Total	645	

In year 2021 was 645 people by ethnicity 607 as Slovak, 33 as Not found out, 7 as Other, 3 as Czech, 2 as German, 1 as Jewish, 1 as Rusyn and 1 as Romanian.

Note on population: The difference values of population numbers in the table "Population statistic" and in the sections "Ethnicity" & "Religion" is caused by the use of various statistical methods.

=== Religion ===
Census 2021 (1+ %)
Religion	Number	Fraction
Evangelical Church	291	45.12%
None	209	32.4%
Roman Catholic Church	100	15.5%
Not found out	35	5.43%
Total	645	

In year 2021 was 645 people by religion 291 from Evangelical Church, 209 from None, 100 from Roman Catholic Church, 35 from Not found out, 4 from Ad hoc movements, 3 from Greek Catholic Church, 1 from Calvinist Church, 1 from Eastern Orthodox Church and 1 from Other.
