= Turiec =

Region in central Slovakia

Coordinates: 49.0628°N 18.9219°E

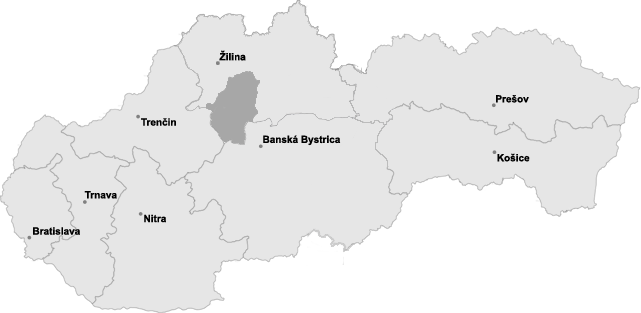
Position of Turiec in Slovakia

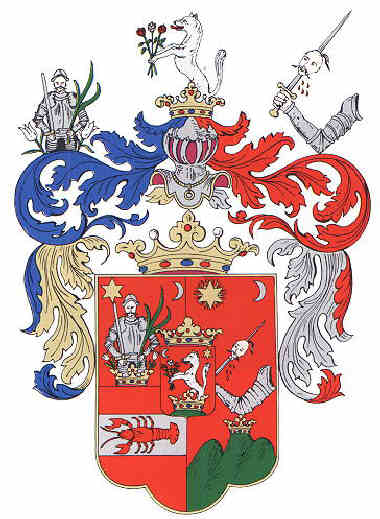
Coat of Arms of Turiec

Turiec is a region in central Slovakia, one of the 21 official tourism regions. The region is not an administrative division today, but between the late 11th century and 1920 it was the Turóc County in the Kingdom of Hungary.

== Etymology ==
The region was named after the Turiec river.

== History ==
Turóc county (Slovak: Turčianska župa) as a Hungarian comitatus arose before the 15th century. In 1920, by the Treaty of Trianon, the territory became part of newly formed Czechoslovakia. Between 1939-1945, after Czechoslovakia was abolished, Turiec was part of the First Slovak Republic. After World War II, it became part of Czechoslovakia again. In 1993, Czechoslovakia was split and Turiec became part of Slovakia.

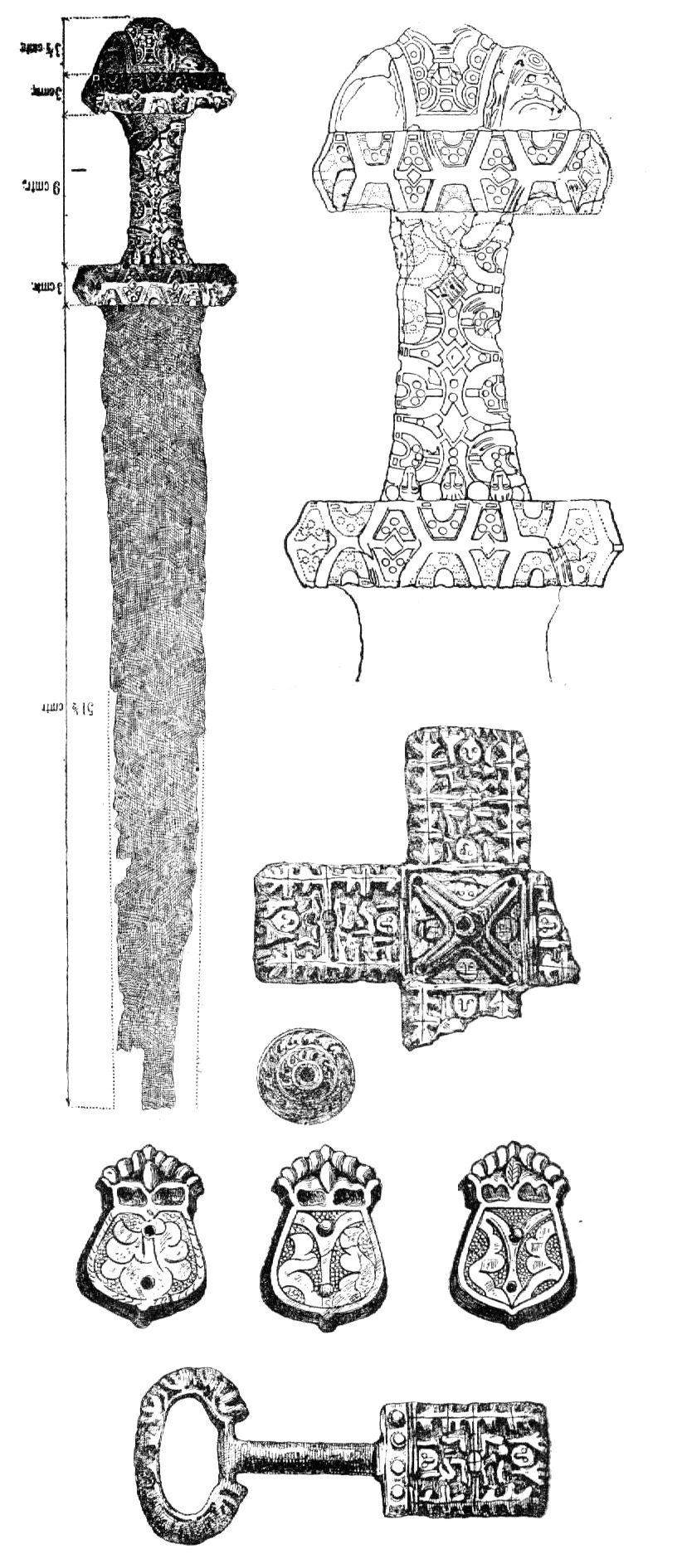
Great Moravian sword from Blatnica

== Geography ==
The region covers the area of the Turiec basin and is determined by the mountain ranges of Veľká Fatra to the east, Malá Fatra to the west and north, Žiar to the south and west and Kremnica Mountains to the south. The Turiec river flows through the entire region and inflows into Váh near Vrútky.

== Subdivisions ==
In the early 20th century, the subdivisions of Turóc/Turiec county were:

- Lower Turiec - its center was Martin and the subregion corresponds to the present-day District of Martin
- Upper Turiec - its center was Turčianske Teplice and the subregion corresponds to the present-day District of Turčianske Teplice
