= Hadviga =

- abandoned settlement
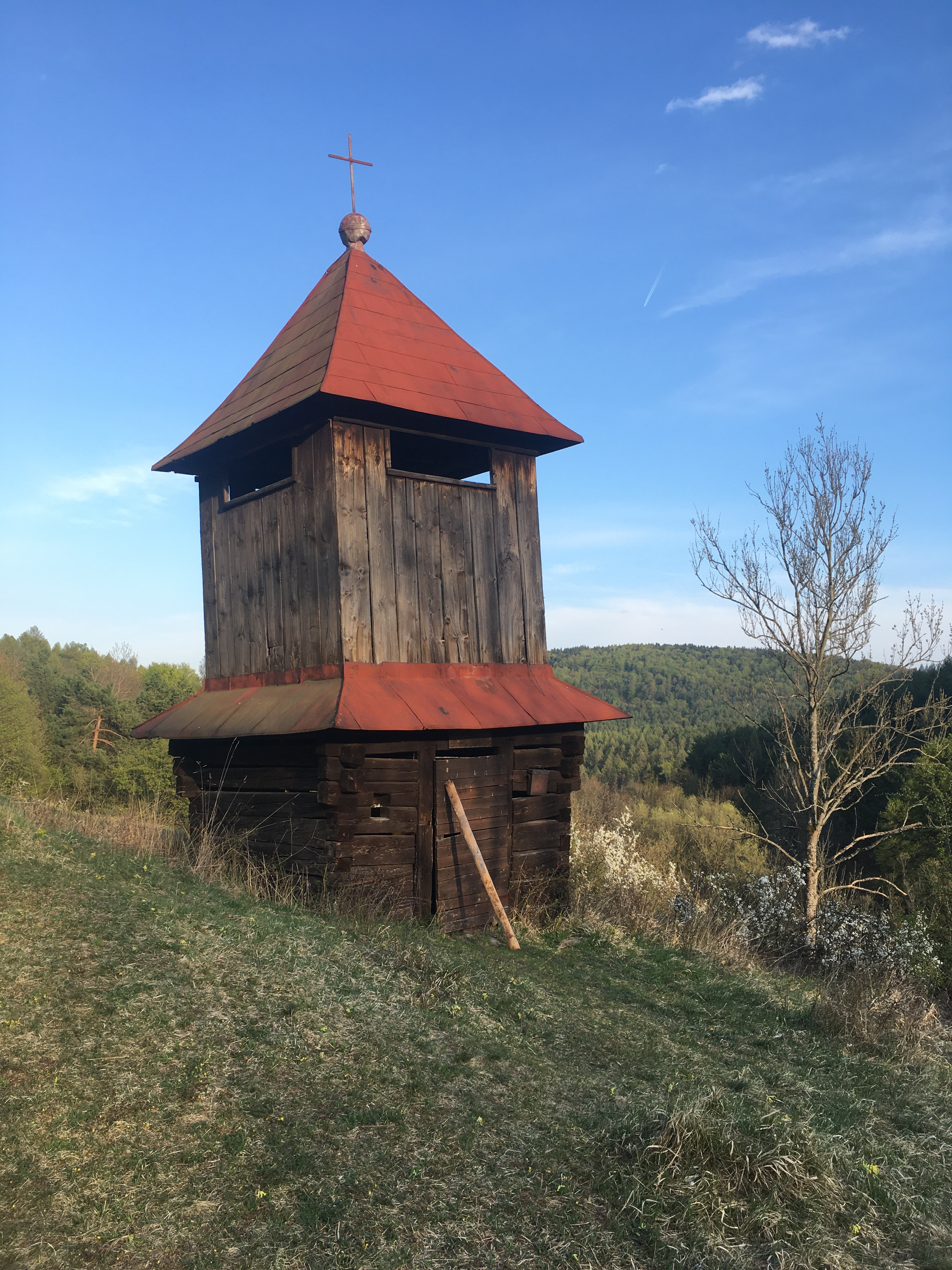
- Belfry

- Location of Hadviga in Slovakia
- Coordinates: 48°54′N 18°42′E
- Country: Slovakia
- Region: Žilina
- District: Turčianske Teplice
- Established: 1392
- Postal code: 038 22
- Car plate: TR

Hadviga (German: Hedwig) is an abandoned settlement in Brieštie in Turčianske Teplice District in the Žilina Region of northern central Slovakia.

== History ==
In historical records the village was first mentioned in 1392. It was named after founder's wife. The village belonged to a German language island. The German population was expelled in 1945.

== Demography ==
The settlement is currently uninhabitated and serves solely a recreational purpose.
