= Brieštie =

- Municipality
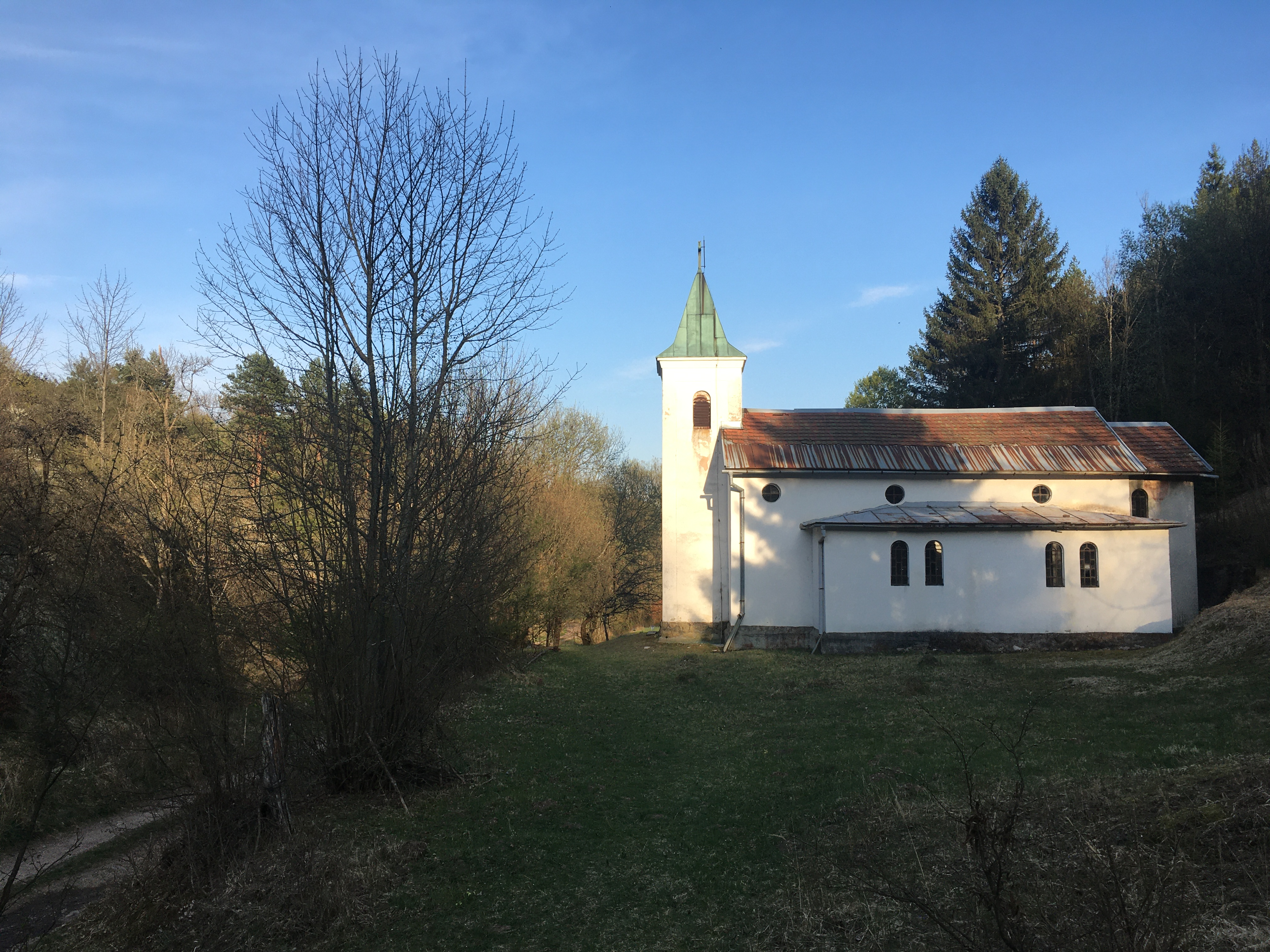
- Roman-catholic church in Hadviga settlement, which is a part of Brieštie

- Flag

- Location of Brieštie in the Žilina Region Location of Brieštie in Slovakia
- Coordinates: 48.92°N 18.73°E
- Country: Slovakia
- Region: Žilina Region
- District: Turčianske Teplice District
- First mentioned: 1392

Area
  - Total: 11.17 km^{2} (4.31 sq mi)
- Elevation: 561 m (1,841 ft)

Population (2025)
  - Total: 125
- Time zone: UTC+1 (CET)
  - Summer (DST): UTC+2 (CEST)
- Postal code: 382 2
- Area code: +421 43
- Vehicle registration plate (until 2022): RK
- Website: www.briestie.sk

Brieštie (German: Bries or Brestenhau; Hungarian: Berestyénfalva, until 1889 Brjesztya) is a village and municipality in Turčianske Teplice District in the Žilina Region of northern central Slovakia. A former german village of Hadviga is now part of the village.

== History ==
In historical records the village was first mentioned in 1392. Before the establishment of independent Czechoslovakia in 1918, it was part of Turóc County within the Kingdom of Hungary. From 1939 to 1945, it was part of the Slovak Republic.

The village once belonged to the German language island of Hauerland but the majority of the German population was expelled at the end of World War II.

== Geography ==
The municipality lies at an altitude of 561 metres (1,841 ft) and covers an area of 11.17 km^{2} (4.31 sq mi) (2025).

== Population ==
Population statistic (10 years)
Year	1995	2005	2015	2025
Count	182	157	136	125
Difference		−13.73%	−13.37%	−8.08%

Population statistic
Year	2024	2025
Count	128	125
Difference		−2.34%

It has a population of 125 people (31 December 2025).

=== Ethnicity ===
Census 2021 (1+ %)
Ethnicity	Number	Fraction
Slovak	130	95.58%
German	9	6.61%
Not found out	3	2.2%
Rusyn	2	1.47%
Total	136	

In year 2021 was 136 people by ethnicity 130 as Slovak, 9 as German, 3 as Not found out, 2 as Rusyn and 1 as Other.

Note on population: The difference values of population numbers in the table "Population statistic" and in the sections "Ethnicity" & "Religion" is caused by the use of various statistical methods.

=== Religion ===
Census 2021 (1+ %)
Religion	Number	Fraction
Evangelical Church	60	44.12%
Roman Catholic Church	39	28.68%
None	32	23.53%
Not found out	3	2.21%
Total	136	

In year 2021 was 136 people by religion 60 from Evangelical Church, 39 from Roman Catholic Church, 32 from None, 3 from Not found out, 1 from Calvinist Church and 1 from Eastern Orthodox Church.

== Genealogical resources ==
The records for genealogical research are available at the state archive "Statny Archiv in Bytca, Slovakia"

- Roman Catholic church records (births/marriages/deaths): 1730-1897 (parish B)
- Lutheran church records (births/marriages/deaths): 1784-1896 (parish B)

== See also ==
- List of municipalities and towns in Slovakia
