= Ostrá =

Ostrá may refer to:

- Ostrá (Nymburk District), a village and municipality in Czech Republic
- Ostrá (Veľká Fatra), a mountain in Slovakia
- Ostrá Lúka, a village and municipality in Slovakia

== See also ==
- Ostra (disambiguation)
