= Blatnica Castle =

Castle ruins in Slovakia

Blatnica
- Blatnický hrad
- Martin, Žilina
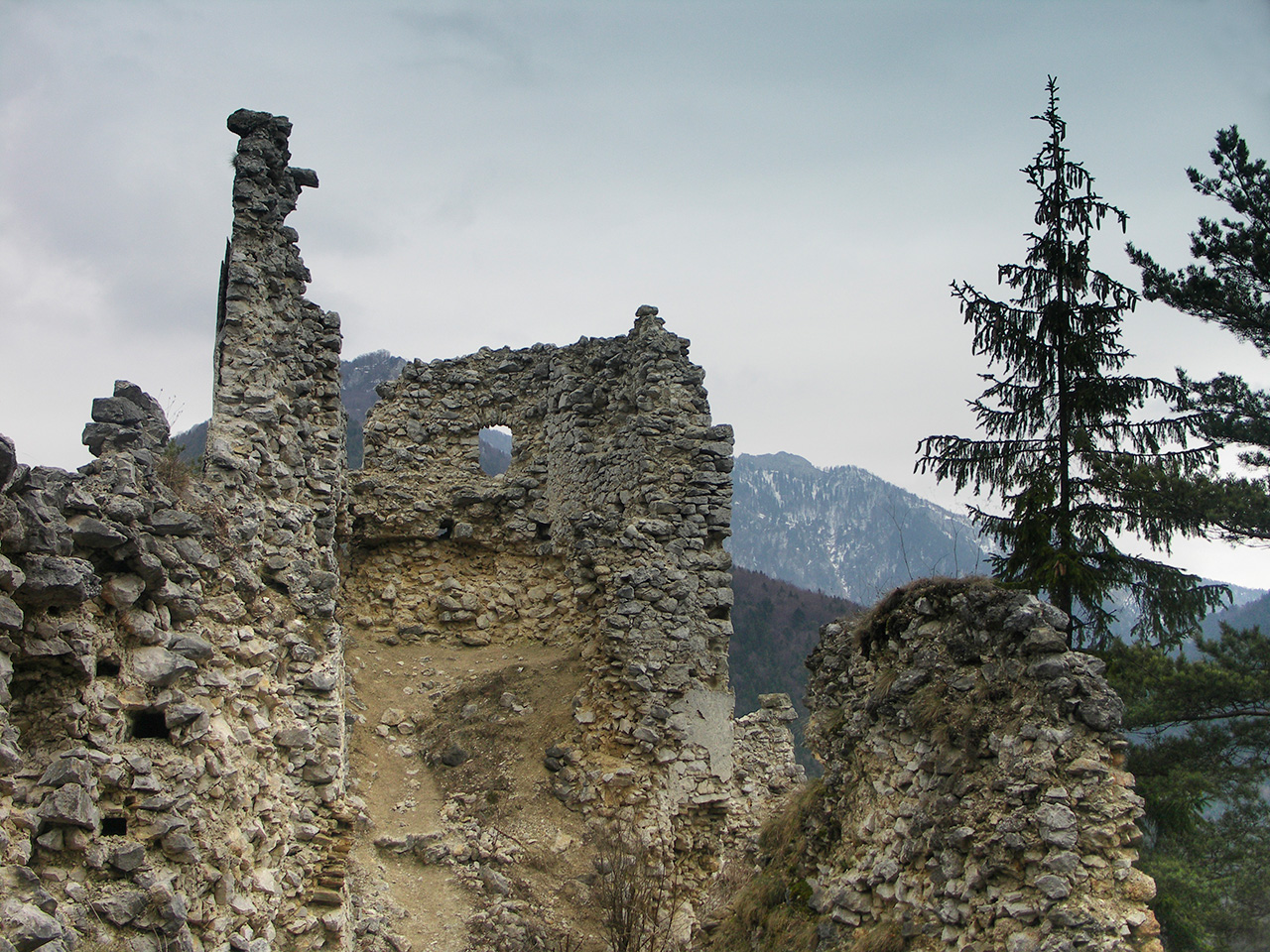
- View from the Blatnica Castle

Site information
- Type: Castle
- Open to the public: freely accessible

Location
- Location of Blatnica in Slovakia
- Coordinates: 48°56′50″N 18°56′51″E

Site history
- Built: 13th century
- Materials: masonry

Blatnica Castle (Slovak: Blatnický hrad) is a Gothic castle whose ruins are situated near the village of Blatnica, on the foot of the Greater Fatra Range in Slovakia.

The castle was built in the 13th century to protect a major trade route running from Nitra to the north. Soon afterwards it became a royal castle but the kings lost their interest in the castle's development after a new route, through Mošovce and Martin was built. The new owners of Blatnica Castle, the Révay family (from 1540), were more generous and the castle was significantly extended in the second half of the 16th century. Since 1744 the castle has been abandoned and has turned into ruins.

The castle is built on typo low ridge of Plešovica which separates the Turiec Basin from the Greater Fatra Range. It is freely accessible from the village of Blatnica by a marked footpath. The castle remnants are hidden in a forest with limited views at the Gader Valley, which stretches underneath, and the opposite Tlstá Mountain.
