= Veľká Fatra National Park =

National park in Slovakia

Coordinates: 49.068117°N 19.187933°E

Greater Fatra
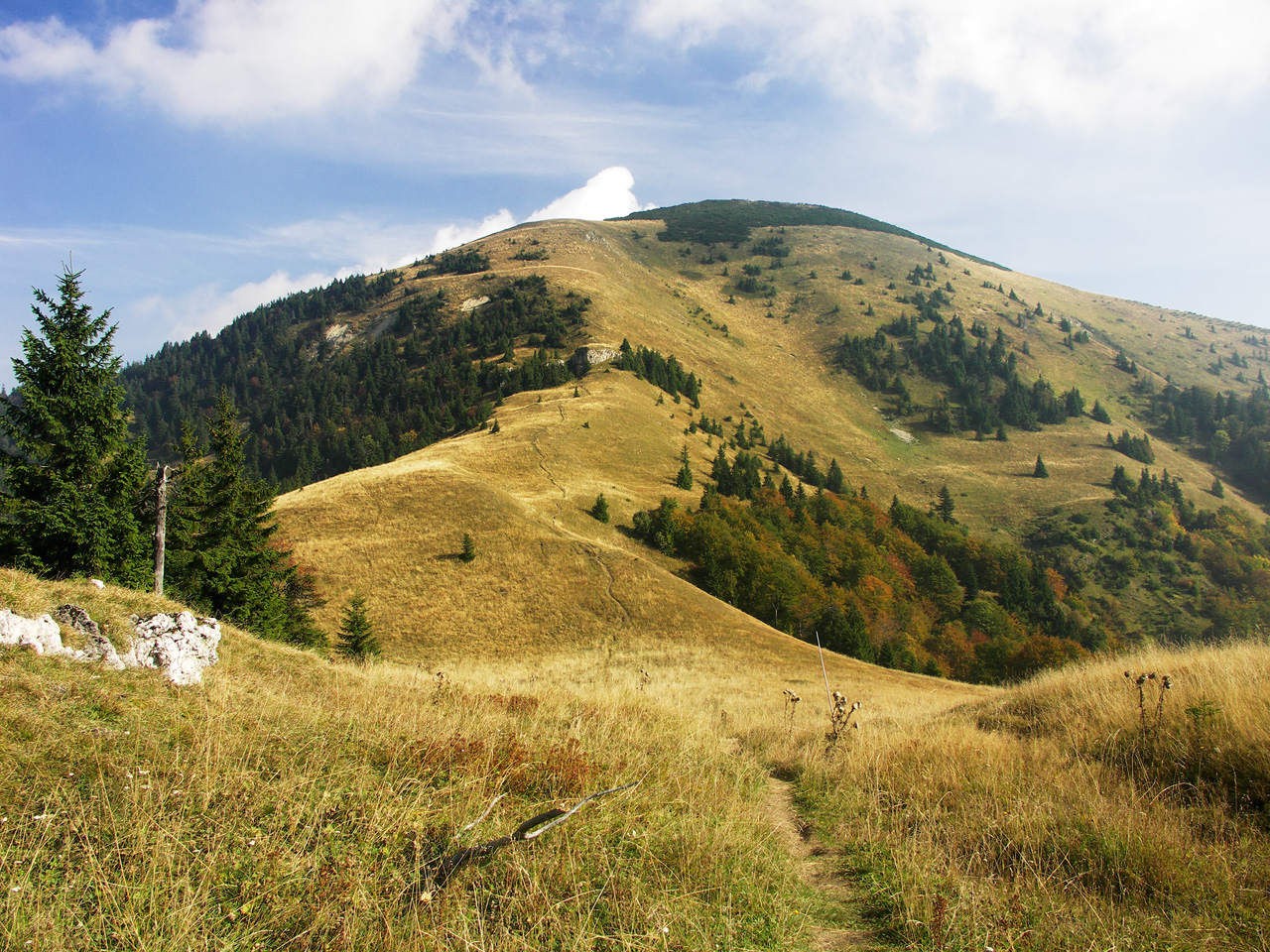
- Rakytov Mountain

- Location of the Veľká Fatra National Park (darker green) and its buffer zone (lighter green) within Slovakia
- Location: Slovakia
- Area: 40,371.34 ha (155.8746 sq mi)
- Established: 1 April 2002
- Operator: Správa NP Veľká Fatra

Veľká Fatra National Park (Slovak: Národný park Veľká Fatra) is a National Park in Slovakia. Most of it lies in the southern part of the Žilina Region and a small part in the northern part of Banská Bystrica Region. The national park and its protective zone comprise most of the Greater Fatra Range (Slovak: Veľká Fatra) which belongs to the Outer Western Carpathians.

The National Park was declared on 1 April 2002 as an upgrade of the Protected Landscape Area (Slovak: Chránená krajinná oblasť (CHKO) Veľká Fatra) of the same name established in 1972 to protect a mountain range with a high percentage of well-preserved Carpathian forests, with prevailing European beech, which cover 90% of the area in combination with ridge-top cattle pastures dating back to the 15th – 17th centuries, to the times of the so-called Walachian colonisation. In places there are also relict Scots pine forests and the Harmanec valley is notable as the richest Irish yew tree location in Central and probably all Europe. NP Veľká Fatra is also an important reservoir of fresh water thanks to high rainfalls and low evaporation in the area. The core of the range is built of granite which reaches the surface only in places, more common are various slates creating gently modelled ridges and summits of the so-called Hôlna Fatra and limestone and dolomite strata creating a rough and picturesque terrain of the so-called Bralná Fatra. There are also many karst features, namely caves, Harmanec Cave being the only one open to the public.

Various rocks and therefore various soils, diverse type of terrain with gentle upland meadows and pastures, sharp cliffs and deep valleys provide for extremely rich flora and fauna. All species of big Central European carnivores live abundantly there: brown bear, grey wolf and Eurasian lynx.

The area is popular with tourists, mainly hikers and trekkers as there rather few resorts, located outside the National Park. The UNESCO World Heritage village of Vlkolínec with well-preserved log cabins lies nearby.

== Small protected areas ==
As of February 2007, there were following small protected areas within the NP Veľká Fatra and its buffer zone:

Name	Established	Size		Reason for protection
National Nature Reserve
Borišov	1981	430 ha	1,063 acres	
Čierny kameň	1964	34 ha	84 acres	
Harmanecká tisina	1949	20 ha	49 acres	
Jánošíkova kolkáreň	1964	243 ha	600 acres	
Kornietová	1973	84 ha	208 acres	
Kundračka	1973	115 ha	284 acres	
Lysec	1984	70 ha	173 acres	
Madačov	1984	331 ha	818 acres	
Padva	1972	325 ha	803 acres	
Rakšianske rašelinisko	1984	6 ha	15 acres	
Rumbáre	1973	52 ha	128 acres	
Skalná Alpa	1964	525 ha	1,297 acres	
Suchý vrch	1988	71 ha	175 acres	
Tlstá	1981	3,066 ha	7,576 acres	
Veľká Skalná	1988	645 ha	1,594 acres	
Nature Reserve
Biela Skala	1993	185 ha	457 acres	
Harmanecký Hlboký jarok	1998	53.33 ha	131.78 acres	
Katova skala	1982	47 ha	116 acres	
Korbeľka	1973	86 ha	213 acres	
Rojkovské rašelinisko	1950	3 ha	7 acres	
National Nature Monument
Perlová jaskyňa	2001	450 m	1,480 ft	
National Nature Monument
Dogerské skaly	1952	0.2 ha	0.5 acres	
Hradené jazero Blatné	1990	4 ha	10 acres	
Jazierske travertíny	1952	2 ha	5 acres	
Krkavá skala	1952	0.3 ha	0.7 acres	
Majerova skala	1992	9 ha	22 acres	
Matejkovský kamenný prúd	1986	9 ha	22 acres	
Prielom Teplého potoka	1984	21 ha	52 acres	
Rojkovská travertínová kopa	1971	0.1 ha	0.2 acres	
Travertínové terasy Bukovinka	1980	2 ha	5 acres	
Vlčia skala	1952	1 ha	2 acres	
Protected Areal
Dekretov porast	1999	6 ha	15 acres	
Háj pred dolinou Teplô	1975	0.2 ha	0 acres	
Krásno	1997	125 ha	309 acres	
Mošovské aleje	1969	272.92 ha	674.40 acres	
Revúca	2002	39 ha	96 acres	

== Resources ==
- Brandos, Otakar (2004). Veľká Fatra, Šípska Fatra. Ostrava: SKY. ISBN 80-86774-02-3.
- VKÚ Harmanec (2003). Veľká Fatra. Edícia turistických máp 1:50000. Harmanec: VKÚ. ISBN 80-8042-044-0.
- "Veľká Fatra".
- "Štátny zoznam osobitne chranených častí prírody SR". Archived from the original on 18 May 2007.
