= Blatnica Valley =

Blatnica
- Blatnická dolina
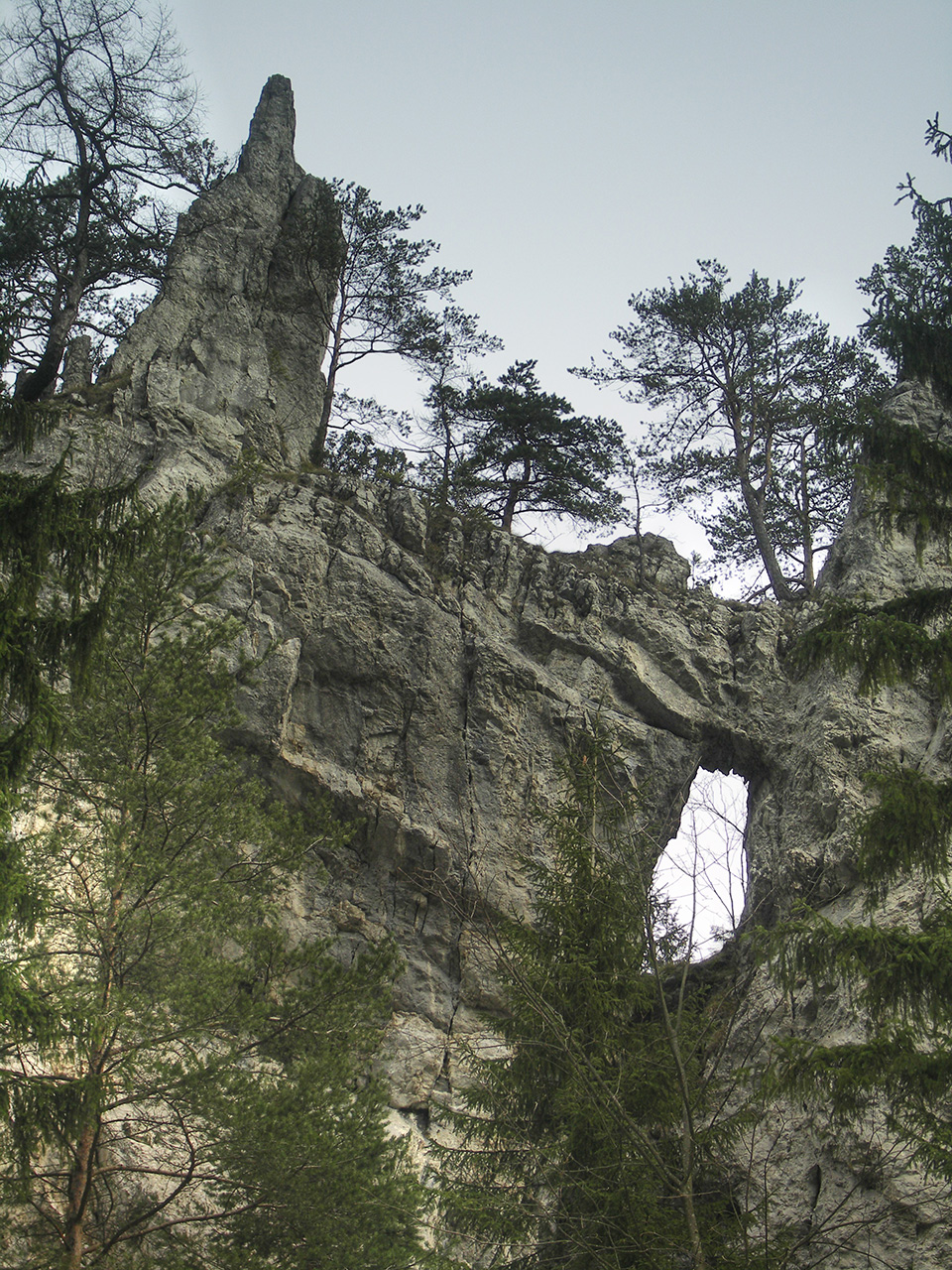
- Rock window in the Blatnica Valley

- Location within Slovakia
- Length: 8 km (5.0 mi)

Geography
- Location: Juriašovo crossing
- Country: Slovakia
- State/Province: Žilina
- District: Martin
- Coordinates: 48°54′22″N 18°57′47″E
- Mountain range: Greater Fatra
- River: Blatnica Stream
- Interactive map of Blatnica

The Blatnica Valley (Slovak: Blatnická dolina) is a karst valley in the Greater Fatra Range in Slovakia. It is 8 km long.

It is accessible from the village of Blatnica along a dirt road. Most of the valley is densely forested, in places with views at the surrounding limestone and dolomite strata. The best-known part of the valley is the rock window at its lower part. Ostrá and Drieňok mountains can be climbed from the valley bottom.
