= Borišov =

Mountain in Slovakia

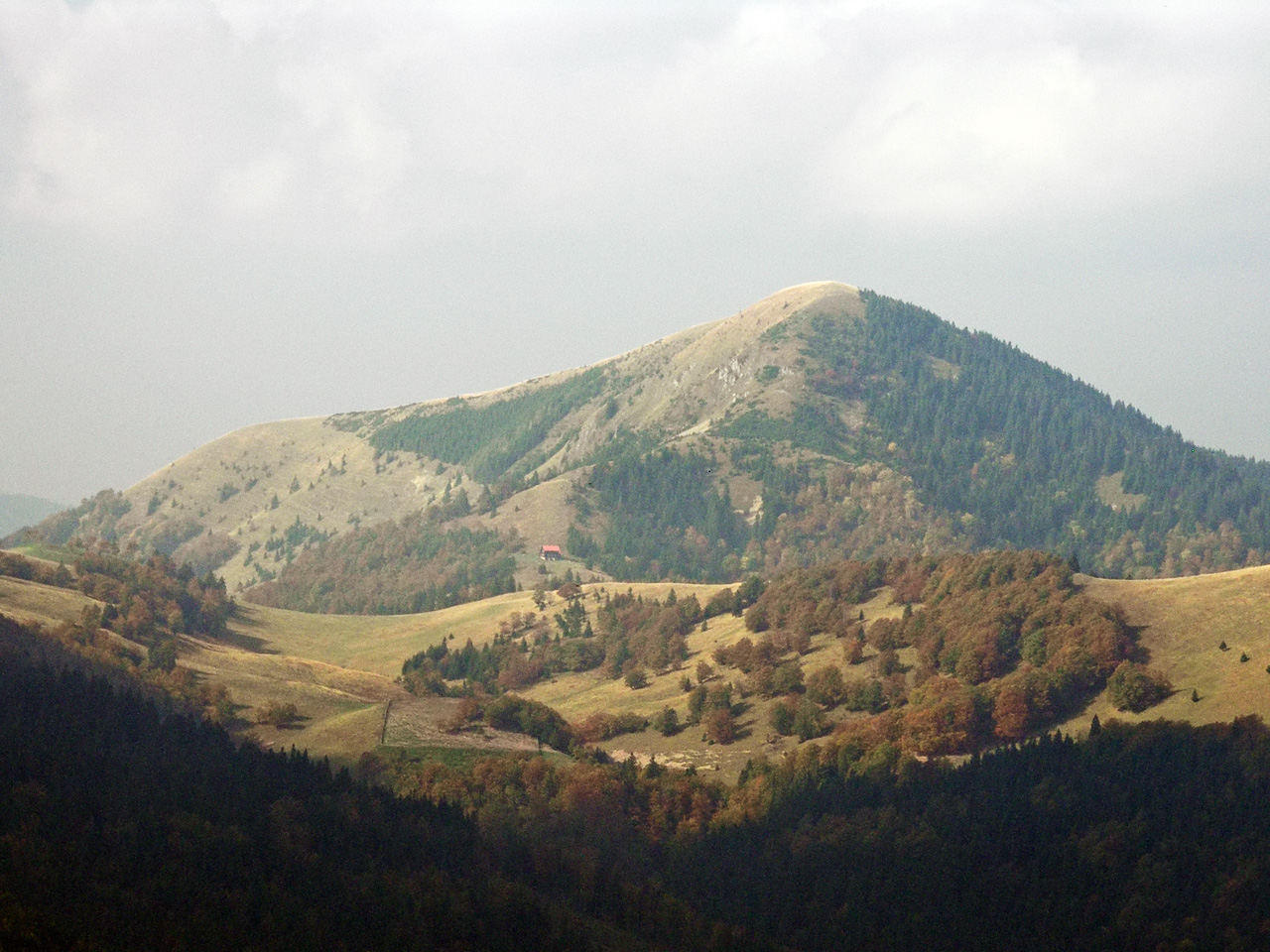

Highest point
- Elevation: 1,509.5 m (4,952 ft)
- Coordinates: 48°56′28.2″N 19°05′22.2″E

Geography
- Location within Slovakia
- Location: Martin, Žilina, Slovakia
- Parent range: Greater Fatra

Borišov is a mountain in the Greater Fatra Range in Slovakia measuring 1,508.5 m (4,949.1 ft). Its summit is deforested, covered in grass. On the southern side there is one of the largest avalanche slopes in Slovakia. The Borišov National Nature Reserve protects a well-preserved primeval mountain forest on the northern side of the mountain.

In the saddle between Borišov and Ploská is the Chata pod Borišovom (transl. Chalet under Borišov), open year-round.
