= Blatnica, Slovakia =

Blatnica
- Municipality
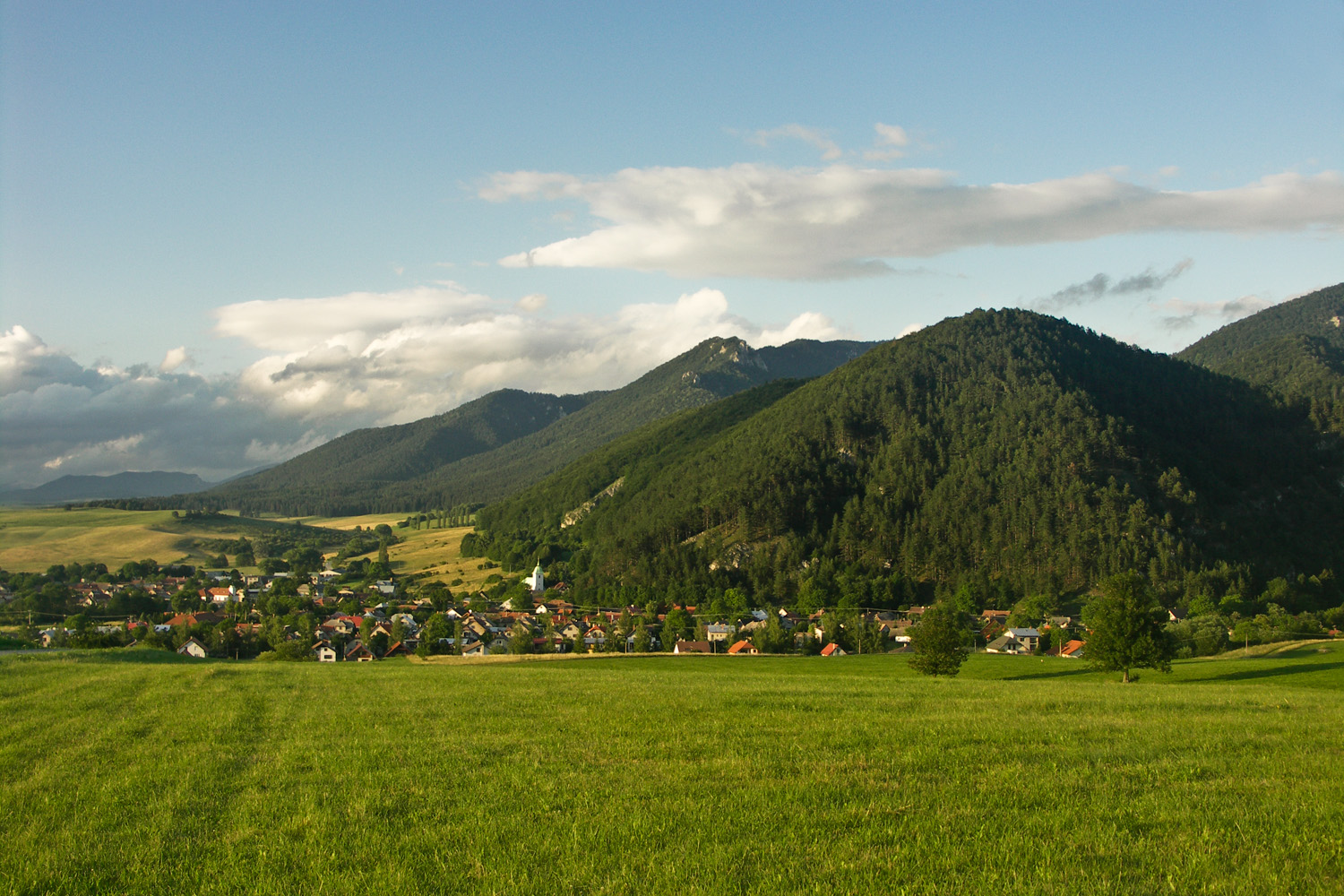
- Blatnica on the foot of the Greater Fatra Range

- Flag

- Location of Blatnica in the Žilina Region Location of Blatnica in Slovakia
- Coordinates: 48°56′13″N 18°55′36″E
- Country: Slovakia
- Region: Žilina Region
- District: Martin District
- First mentioned: 1120

Area
  - Total: 86.18 km^{2} (33.27 sq mi)
- Elevation: 495 m (1,624 ft)

Population (2025)
  - Total: 1,065
- Time zone: UTC+1 (CET)
  - Summer (DST): UTC+2 (CEST)
- Postal code: 381 5
- Area code: +421 43
- Vehicle registration plate (until 2022): MT
- Website: www.blatnica.sk

Blatnica (1927–1946 Turčianska Blatnica, Hungarian: Blatnica) is a village and municipality in the Turiec region of Slovakia. Administratively it is a part of the Martin District in the Žilina Region. The village is situated under the Greater Fatra Range, at the opening of the spectacular karst Gader and Blatnica valleys. The ruins of the Blatnica Castle lie on a low ridge over the village.

== Etymology ==
The name means "a muddy place" (Slovak: blato - mud).

== Geography ==
The municipality lies at an altitude of 495 metres (1,624 ft) and covers an area of 86.18 km^{2} (33.27 sq mi) (2025).

== History ==
Blatnica is an important archaeological site, where Slavic tumuli with many precious artifacts (such as the famous Blatnica Sword) from the 8th and 9th centuries have been found. The site gave name to the so-called "Blatnica-Mikulčice" archaeological horizon. The first written mention stems from 1230, however, the castle was built at the end of the 13th century. Before the establishment of independent Czechoslovakia in 1918, it was part of Turóc County within the Kingdom of Hungary. From 1939 to 1945, it was part of the Slovak Republic.

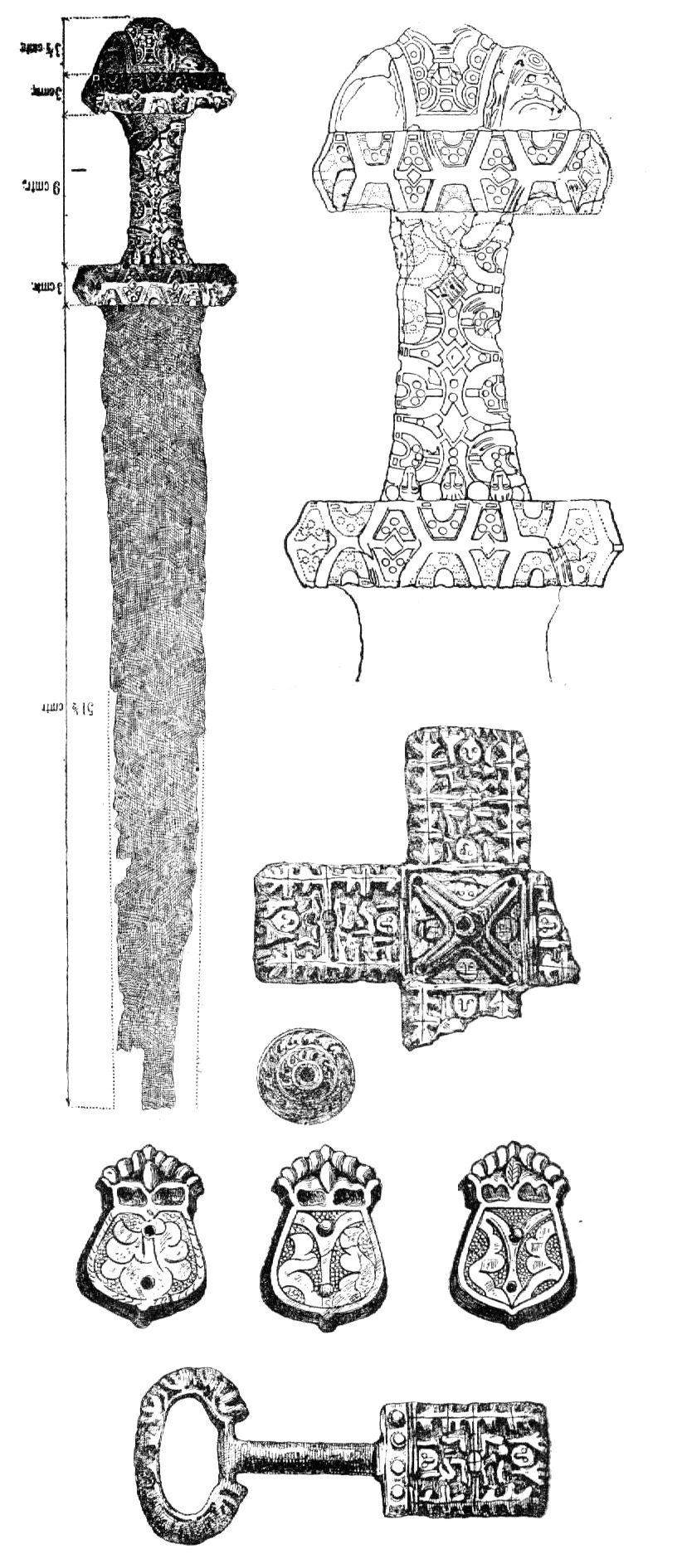
Great Moravian sword from Blatnica, unearthed in the 19th century, originally interpreted as a burial equipment from a "ducal" mound

== Culture ==
The first Slovak female botanist Izabela Textorisová lived in Blatnica and her rich herbarium contains plants of the nearby Tlstá mountain. Both Textorisová's house and a museum dedicated to the ethnographer, filmmaker, and photographer Karol Plicka are open to the public. Other places of interest include two manor houses from the 18th century, a classicist Lutheran church and many well-preserved rural houses.

== Population ==
Population statistic (10 years)
Year	1995	2005	2015	2025
Count	848	881	910	1065
Difference		+3.89%	+3.29%	+17.03%

Population statistic
Year	2024	2025
Count	1074	1065
Difference		−0.83%

It has a population of 1065 people (31 December 2025).

=== Ethnicity ===
Census 2021 (1+ %)
Ethnicity	Number	Fraction
Slovak	992	97.15%
Not found out	15	1.46%
Total	1021	

In year 2021 was 1021 people by ethnicity 992 as Slovak, 15 as Not found out, 8 as Czech, 6 as Other, 3 as Hungarian, 2 as Rusyn, 2 as Romanian, 2 as German, 1 as Ukrainian and 1 as English.

Note on population: The difference values of population numbers in the table "Population statistic" and in the sections "Ethnicity" & "Religion" is caused by the use of various statistical methods.

=== Religion ===
Census 2021 (1+ %)
Religion	Number	Fraction
Evangelical Church	404	39.57%
None	313	30.66%
Roman Catholic Church	264	25.86%
Not found out	28	2.74%
Total	1021	

In year 2021 was 1021 people by religion 404 from Evangelical Church, 313 from None, 264 from Roman Catholic Church, 28 from Not found out, 3 from Greek Catholic Church, 2 from Ad hoc movements, 1 from Jewish community, 1 from Other and not ascertained christian church, 1 from Islam, 1 from Other, 1 from Hinduism, 1 from United Methodist Church and 1 from Buddhism.

According to the 2001 census, 99% of inhabitants were Slovaks. Blatnica is one of few villages with a Lutheran absolute majority (58.6%) in the predominantly Roman Catholic Slovakia.

== See also ==
- List of municipalities and towns in Slovakia

== Genealogical resources ==
The records for genealogical research are available at the state archive "Statny Archiv in Bytca, Slovakia"

- Roman Catholic church records (births/marriages/deaths): 1777-1949 (parish B)
- Lutheran church records (births/marriages/deaths): 1785-1929 (parish A)
