= Gader Valley =

Valley in Slovakia

Gader
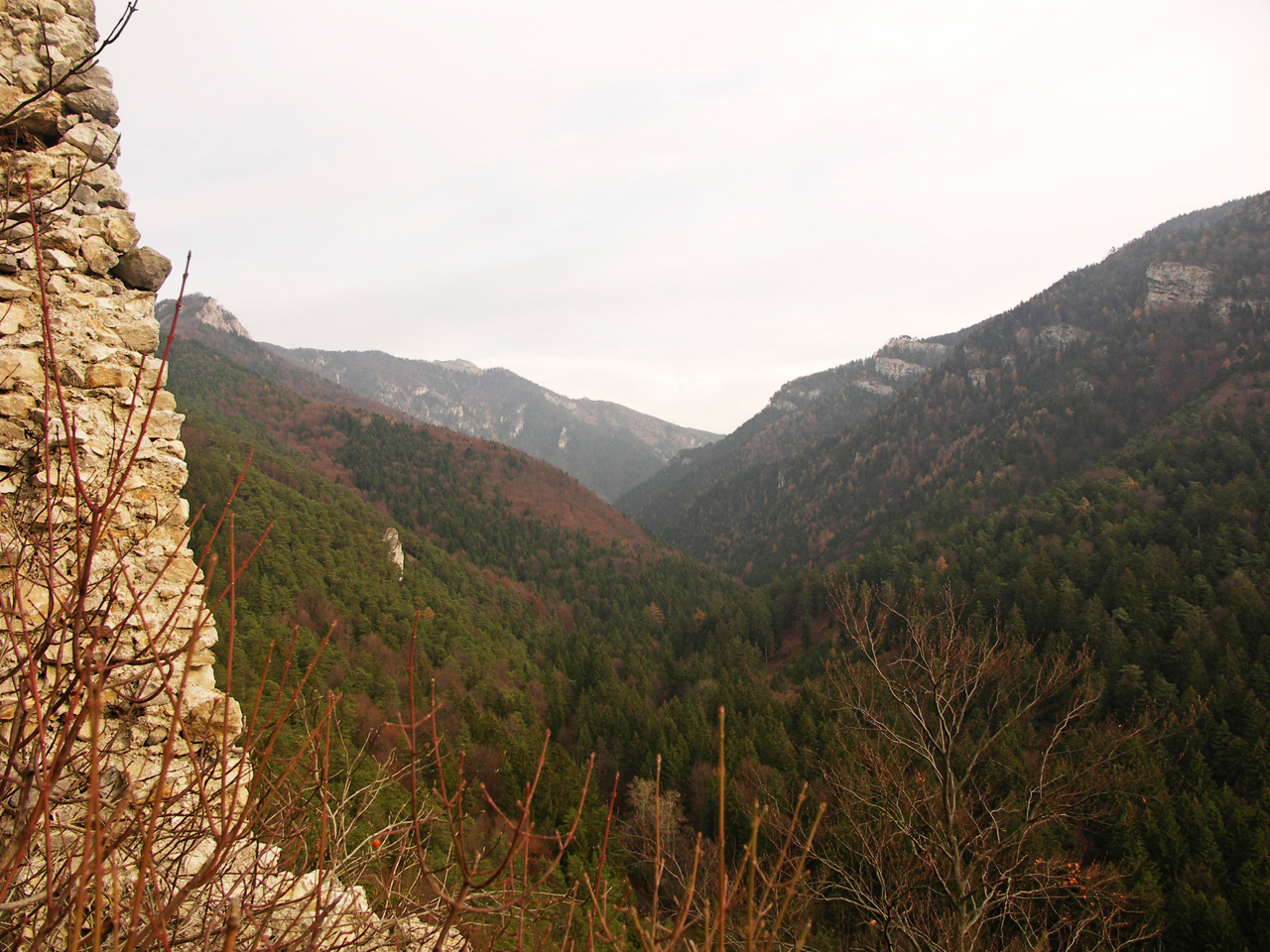
- Gader Valley from the ruins of the Blatnica Castle

- Location within Slovakia
- Length: 18 km (11 mi)

Naming
- Native name: Gaderská dolina (Slovak)

Geography
- Location: merger of Dedošová and Selenec Valleys
- Country: Slovakia
- State/Province: Žilina
- District: Martin
- Coordinates: 48°56′37″N 19°00′22″E
- Mountain range: Greater Fatra
- River: Gaderský potok
- Interactive map of Gader

Gader Valley (Slovak: Gaderská dolina) is a long valley in the Greater Fatra Range in Central Slovakia. It is accessible from the village of Blatnica. The valley is the gateway to the peaks of Tlstá and Ostrá. Its upper part, from the merger with the Selenec Valley, is named Dedošová. In Gader Valley, there are almost all of the protected species of animals and plants that occur throughout the Great Fatra: 3,000 species of invertebrates, 110 species of birds, and 60 mammalian species. The Tlstá mountain complex was declared a National Nature Reserve in 1972.

Map showing the Greater Fatra Range in the Žilina Region, Slovakia.

About 2 km from the village of Blatnica are the ruins of Blatnica Castle, which dates back to the 13th century. It is located on the low limestone ridge of Plešovice (658 m above sea level), which separates the Gaderská valley from the Turčianska basin. There is a popular hiking trail from Blatnica Castle that leads through the valley.

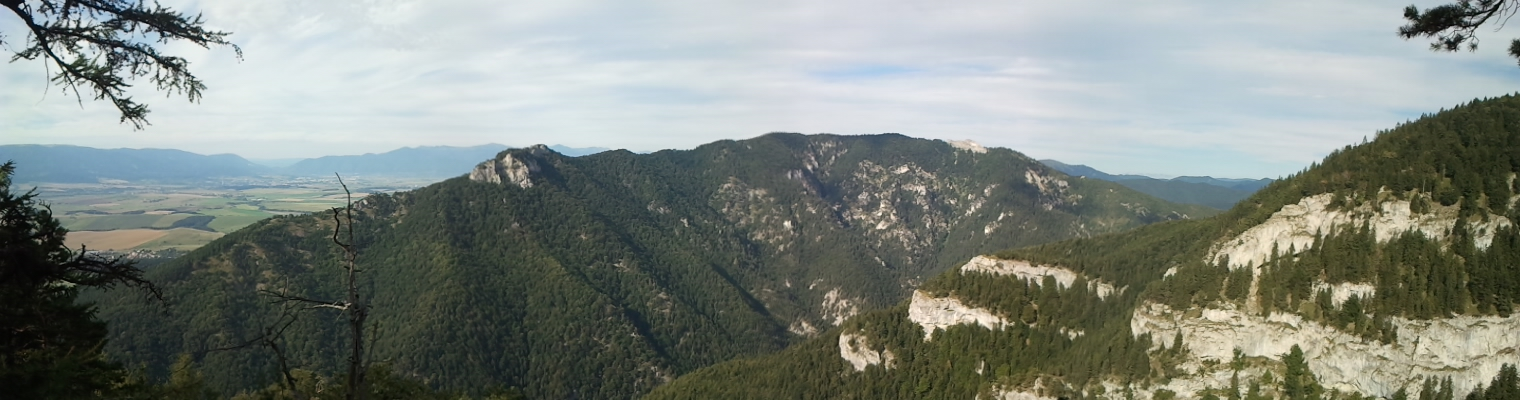
The Gader Valley

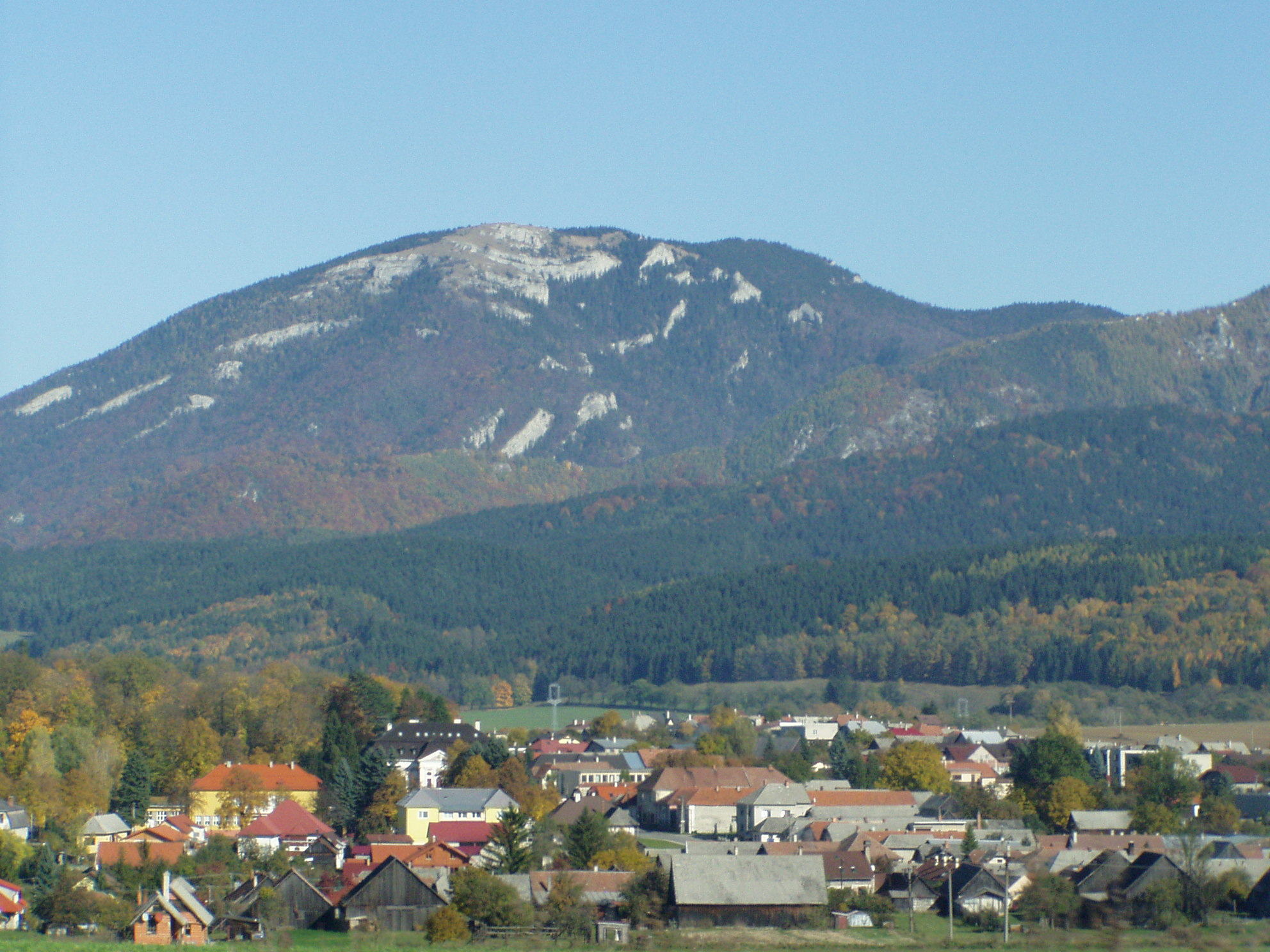
Tlstá peak

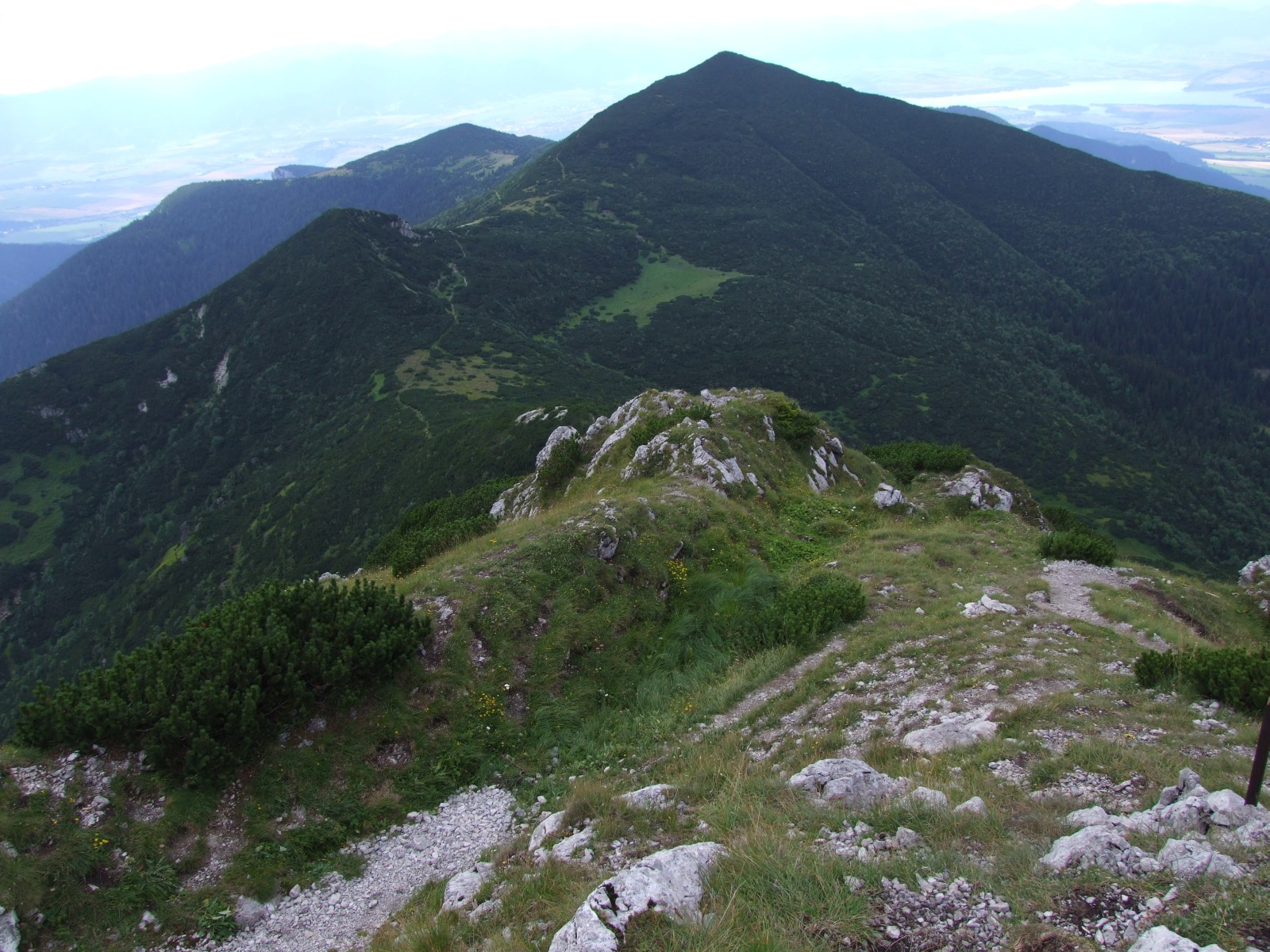
Ostrá peak

== Gallery ==
Cyclists on the asphalt cycling path through the Gader Valley.

A bicycle parked on a forest path in the Gader Valley.

The Čertova brána (Devil's Gate) rock formation in the Gader Valley.

A forest stream flowing over rocks in the Gader Valley.

A fallen tree over a small stream in the forest of the Gader Valley.

A dark rock cavity on a steep slope in the Gader Valley.

A pathway passing through the dense forest of the Gader Valley.

A forest road running along a stream in the Gader Valley.

Fallen tree trunks in the Gader Valley.
