= Ostra =

Ostra or Ostrá or Östra or Oštra may refer to the following places:

== Czech Republic ==
- Ostrá (Nymburk District), a village and municipality in Czech Republic

== Italy ==
- Ancient Ostra, an ancient Roman city in Italy
- Ostra, Marche, a town and commune in Italy
- Ostra Vetere, a town and commune in Italy

== Romania ==
- Ostra, Suceava, a commune in Romania

== Slovakia ==
- Ostrá (Veľká Fatra), a mountain in Slovakia
