= Ostredok =

Hill in National Park Vel'ká Fatra

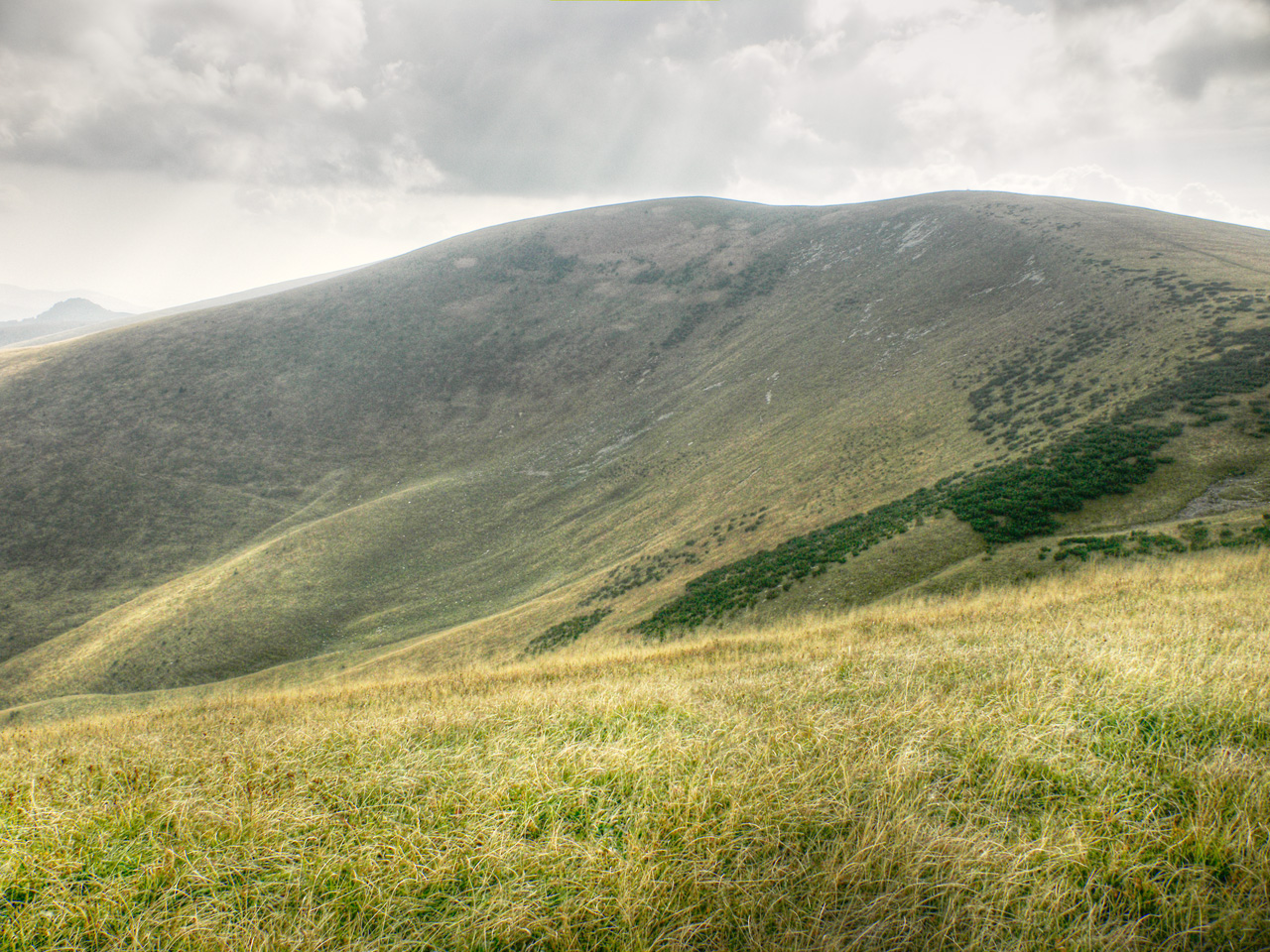

Highest point
- Elevation: 1,596 m (5,236 ft)
- Coordinates: 48°53′57″N 19°04′54″E

Geography
- Location within Slovakia
- Location: Martin and Ružomberok Districts, Žilina, Slovakia
- Parent range: Greater Fatra

Ostredok (1,596 m above sea level) is the highest hill of the Great Fatra, at the same time in the National Park Veľká Fatra. It lies in the main ridge of the mountain. It has two peaks, the main southern (1,596 m above sea level) and a few meters lower north (1,593 m above sea level). The peaks are luminous, providing an undisturbed circular view. The slopes of Ostredok are smoothly modeled, steep, in winter there is a danger of avalanche dropping.

The 49 km long Great-Frontier Highway is marked by the red tourist sign marked with a red tourist mark. [1]

In Slovakia there are up to six hills called Ostredok. [2] [3]
