= Ploská =

Mountain in Slovakia

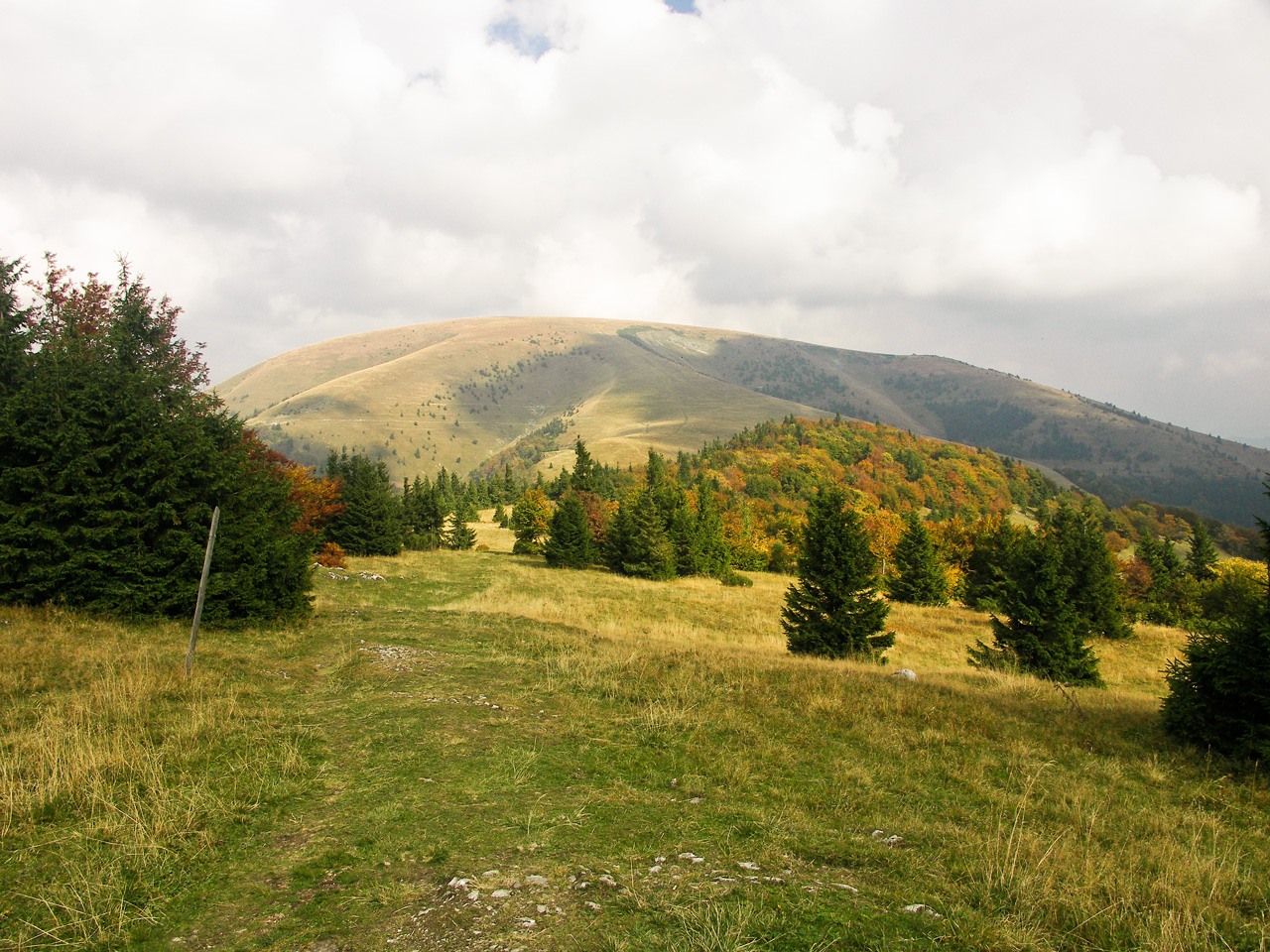

Highest point
- Elevation: 1,532.1 m (5,027 ft)
- Coordinates: 48°56′1.2″N 19°07′0.7″E

Geography
- Location within Slovakia
- Location: Martin, Žilina, Slovakia
- Parent range: Greater Fatra

Ploská is a mountain in the Hôlna Fatra part of the Greater Fatra Range in Slovakia measuring 1,532.1 metres (5,026.6 ft). It lies on the main ridge, to South it continues to Ostredok and Krížna mountains, to the North it divides into the lower western Turiec Ridge (Slovak: Turčianský hrebeň) and higher eastern Liptov Ridge (Slovak: Liptovský hrebeň). It is unique by its large flat grass covered summit, the slopes are dangerous in winter because of frequent avalanches which have claimed many lives.
