= Blatnica-Mikulčice horizon =

Archaeological period in parts of Europe

The Blatnica-Mikulčice horizon is an early medieval archaeological horizon of metalwork. It emerged in the regions north of the Middle Danube – in present-day Czech Republic and Slovakia – following the fall of the Avar Khaganate in the early 9th century. The most featuring "Blatnica-Mikulčice" finds are swords with exquisite decorations from graves of male warriors.

The name of the horizon is derived from the archaeological localities in Blatnica (Slovakia) and Mikulčice (Czech Republic). The artifacts (allegedly) from Blatnica were unearthed already in the 19th century and contained forgings of the late Avar type, forgings of the local provenance and a Carolinian sword. Even if it was in doubt whether all of them are from the same depot and really from Blatnica, most archaeologists adopted a theory that they are from the same "ducal" grave. In the 1930s, a Hungarian archaeologist Nándor Fettich dated artifacts to the turnover of the 8th/9th century assuming their common origin and synthetic style. His dating was accepted also by the Czechoslovak experts. In the 1960s, a Czech archaeologist Josef Poulík associated some of new findings in Mikulčice with those from Blatnica and a further research of old Slavonic stronghold in Pobedim (Darina Bialeková) contributed to the establishment of the term.

The concept of Blatnica-Miklučice horizon belonged for a long time to cornerstones of the Czechoslovak archaeology and influenced dating of several early settlements in Czechia and Slovakia, but also in other Central-European countries. Although the term is still in use, it is target of serious criticism and also according to Bialeková it is not sustainable in the present state of research. The dating is nowadays validated by methods like dendrochronology or radiocarbon dating and in some cases they led to re-evaluation of chronology (e.g. Pohansko, Pobedim).

== Sources ==
- Barford, P. M. (2001). The Early Slavs: Culture and Society in Early Medieval Eastern Europe. Cornell University Press. ISBN 0-8014-3977-9.
- Bialeková, Darina (2012). "Kovania so šarnierom z pobedimského hradiska" (PDF). Acta Historica Neoliensia (in Slovak). 15. ISSN 1336-9148.
- Chorvátová, Hana. "Odíde koncept tzv. blatnicko-mikulčického horizontu do dejín bádania v archeológii?". ArcheológiaSK (in Slovak).
- Curta, Florin (2006). Southeastern Europe in the Middle Ages, 500-1250. Cambridge University Press. ISBN 978-0-521-89452-4.
- Dekan, Ján (1981). Moravia Magna: The Great Moravian Empire, Its Art and Time. Control Data Arts. ISBN 0-89893-084-7.
- Urbańczyk, Przemysław (2005). "Early State Formation in East Central Europe". In Curta, Florin (ed.). East Central & Eastern Europe in the Early Middle Ages. The University of Michigan Press. pp. 139–151. ISBN 978-0-472-11498-6.

Robak, Zbigniew (2017). "The Origins and the Collapse of the Blatnica-Mikulčice Paradigm". Slovenská archeológia. 65: 99–162.Ungerman, Šimon (2011). "Tzv. blatnicko-mikulčický horizont a jeho vliv na chronologii raného středověku". Zborník Slovenského národného múzea – Archeológia, Supplementum. 4: 135–151.
