= Dolný Harmanec =

Dolný Harmanec Alsóhermánd
- Municipality
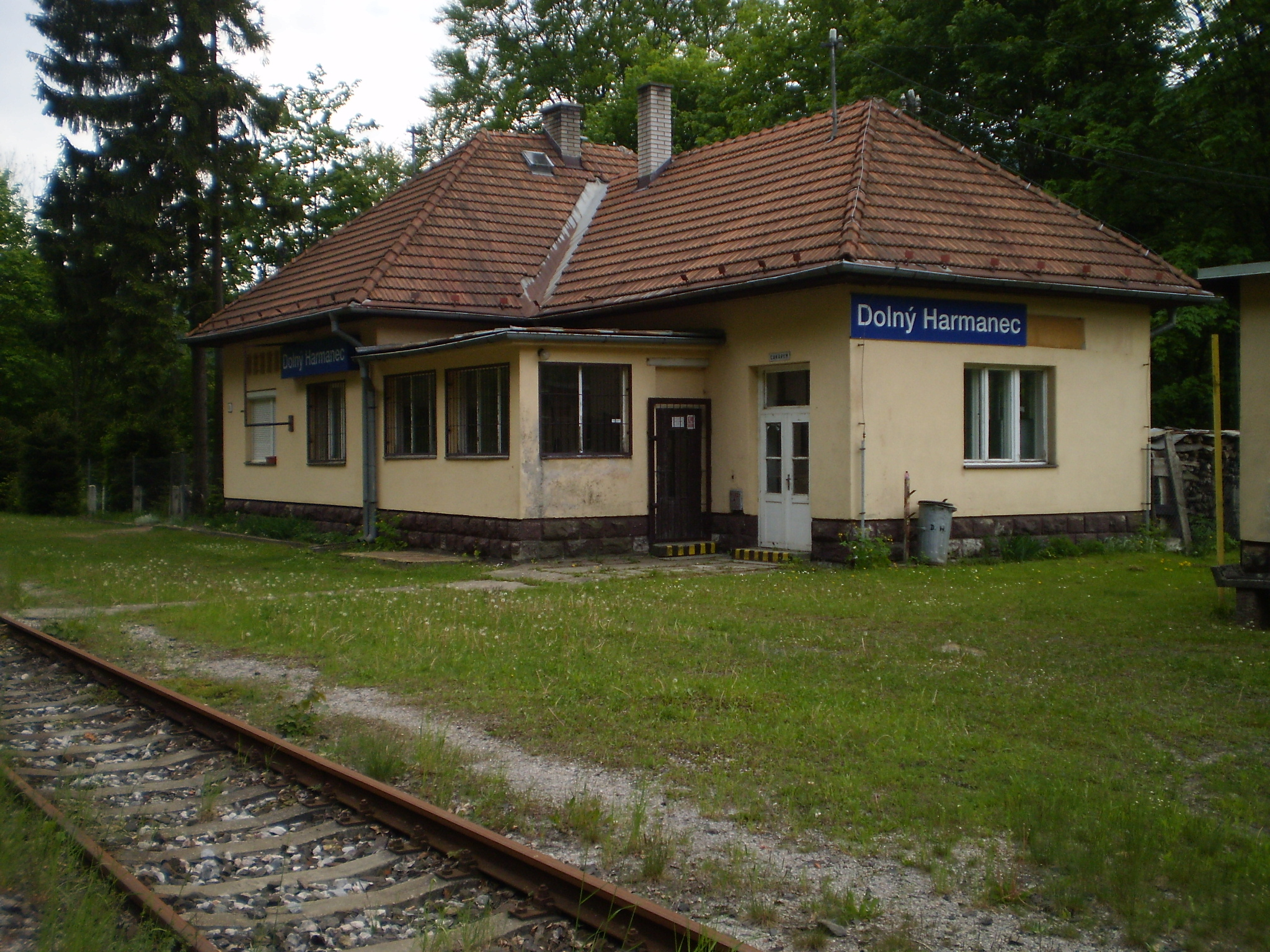

- Flag

- Location of Dolný Harmanec in the Banská Bystrica Region Location of Dolný Harmanec in Slovakia
- Coordinates: 48.82°N 19.03°E
- Country: Slovakia
- Region: Banská Bystrica Region
- District: Banská Bystrica District
- First mentioned: 1540

Government
  - Mayor: Alena Necpalová

Area
  - Total: 44.29 km^{2} (17.10 sq mi)
- Elevation: 484 m (1,588 ft)

Population (2025)
  - Total: 261
- Time zone: UTC+1 (CET)
  - Summer (DST): UTC+2 (CEST)
- Postal code: 976 03
- Area code: +421 48
- Vehicle registration plate (until 2022): BB
- Website: www.dolnyharmanec.sk

Dolný Harmanec (German: Klein Hermans, Unter Hermanetz; Hungarian: Alsóhermánd) is a village and municipality of the Banská Bystrica District in the Banská Bystrica Region of Slovakia. It has a population of 204 people.

== Geography ==
The municipality lies at an altitude of 484 metres (1,588 ft) and covers an area of 44.29 km^{2} (17.10 sq mi) (2025).

== History ==
In historical records, the village was first mentioned in 1540 (Hermans) as a mining settlement belonging to Banská Bystrica. After on, it belonged to the Thurzo family and to rich merchants Fugger. Later on, it belonged to Banská Bystrica again.

== Population ==
Population statistic (10 years)
Year	1995	2005	2015	2025
Count	186	202	247	261
Difference		+8.60%	+22.27%	+5.66%

Population statistic
Year	2024	2025
Count	264	261
Difference		−1.13%

It has a population of 261 people (31 December 2025).

=== Ethnicity ===
Census 2021 (1+ %)
Ethnicity	Number	Fraction
Slovak	254	97.31%
Not found out	4	1.53%
Czech	3	1.14%
Total	261	

In year 2021 was 261 people by ethnicity 254 as Slovak, 4 as Not found out, 3 as Czech and 2 as Romani.

Note on population: The difference values of population numbers in the table "Population statistic" and in the sections "Ethnicity" & "Religion" is caused by the use of various statistical methods.

=== Religion ===
Census 2021 (1+ %)
Religion	Number	Fraction
Roman Catholic Church	140	53.64%
None	92	35.25%
Evangelical Church	16	6.13%
Not found out	3	1.15%
Greek Catholic Church	3	1.15%
Total	261	

In year 2021 was 261 people by religion 140 from Roman Catholic Church, 92 from None, 16 from Evangelical Church, 3 from Not found out, 3 from Greek Catholic Church, 2 from Other, 1 from Paganism and natural spirituality, 1 from Jehovah's Witnesses, 1 from Christian Congregations in Slovakia, 1 from United Methodist Church and 1 from Ad hoc movements.

== Sights ==
The village is located close to the Harmanec Cave.
