= Drieňok =

Drienok
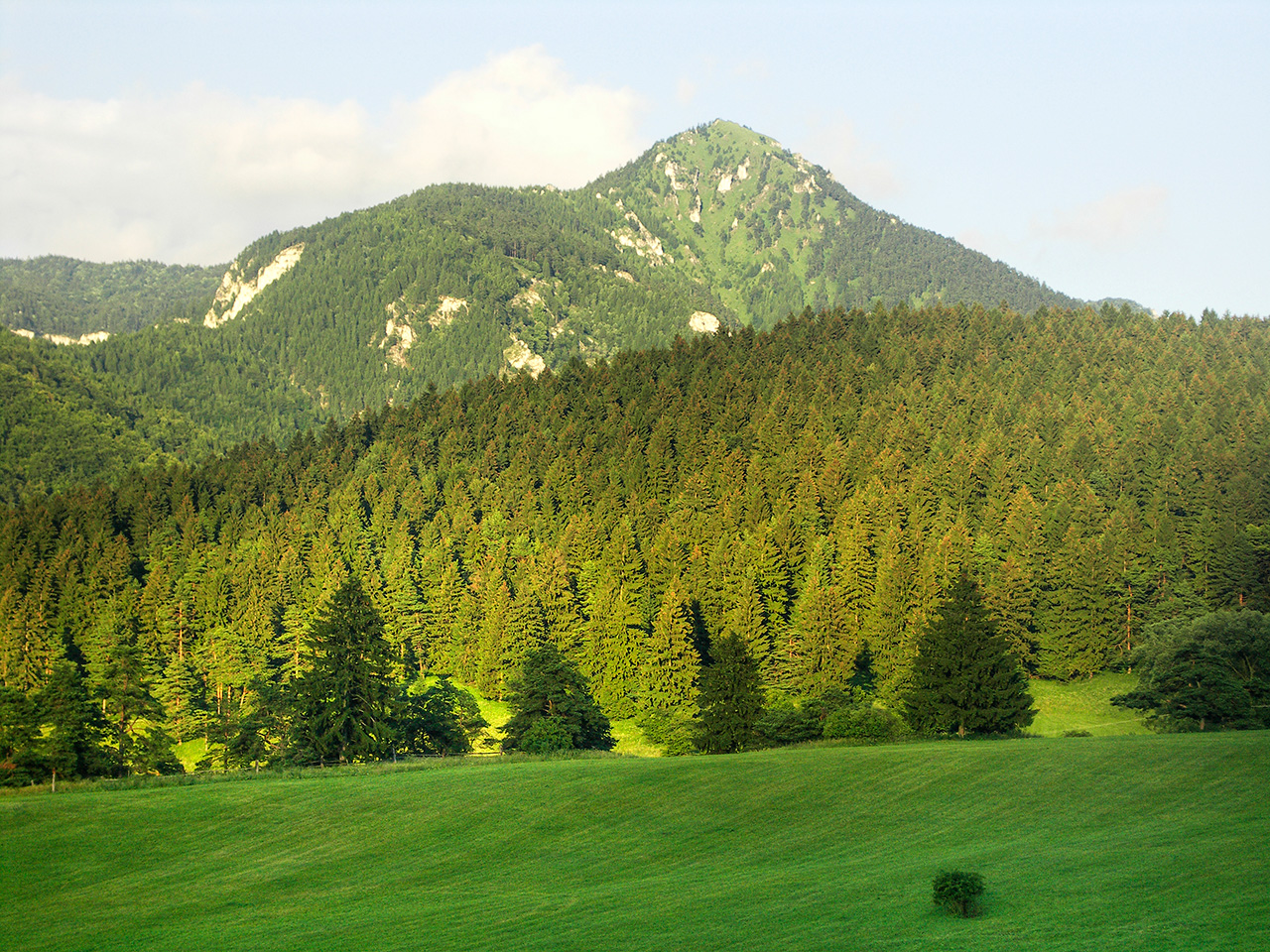

Highest point
- Elevation: 1,268 m (4,160 ft)
- Coordinates: 48°53′25″N 18°57′42″E

Geography
- Location within Slovakia
- Location: Turčianske Teplice, Žilina, Slovakia
- Parent range: Greater Fatra

Geology
- Mountain type(s): limestone and dolomite

Drienok is a mountain in the Greater Fatra Range of Slovakia measuring 1,268 m (4,160 ft). The typical pyramidal shape of the mountain, which lies on the edge of the range, steeply rises over the Turiec valley and is easily recognizable from any direction. Under the summit there is an emblematic dead and dry tree.

From 2007 it was renamed from "Drieňok" to "Drienok".

== Gallery ==
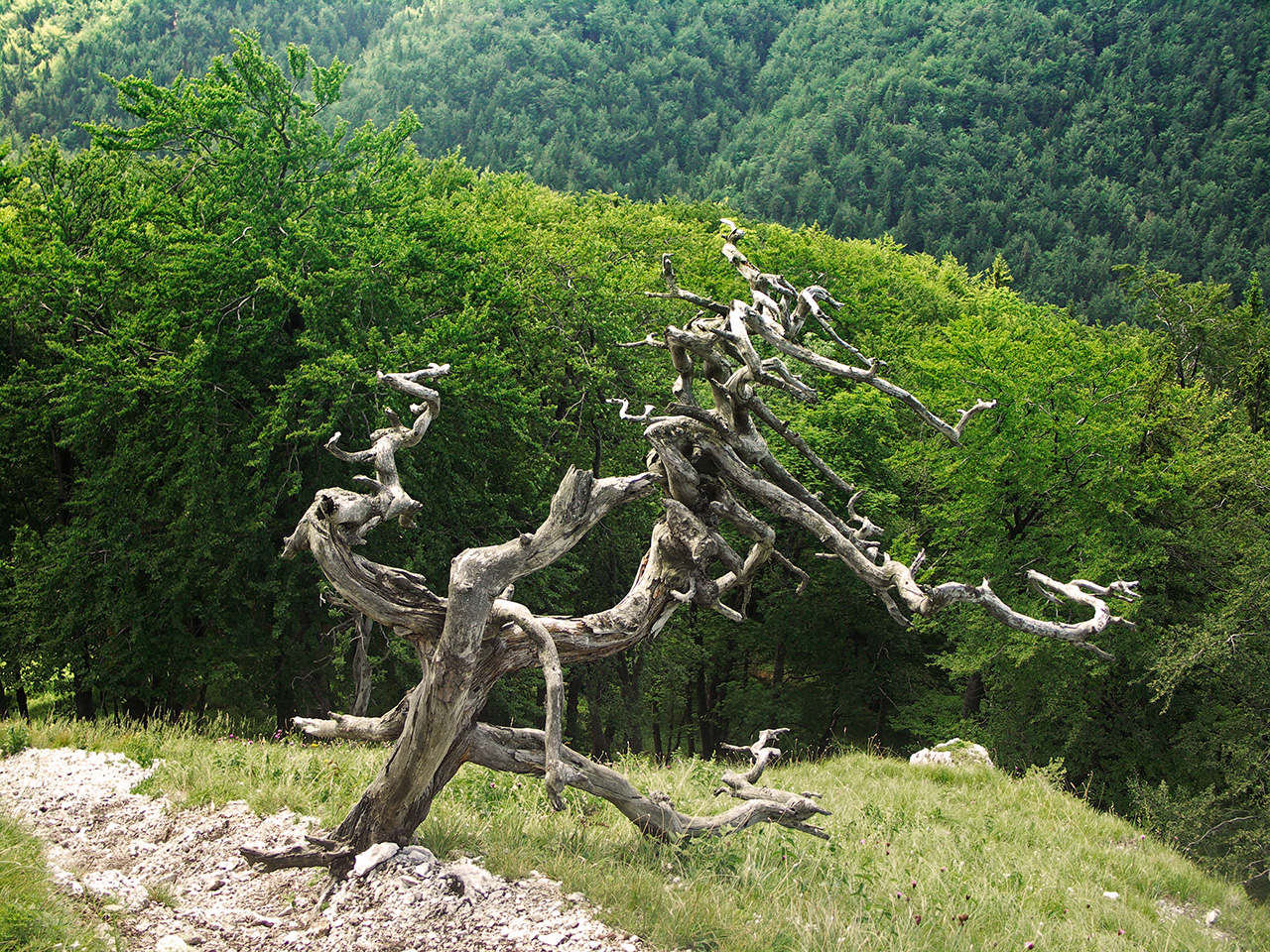
The emblematic dead tree under the summit

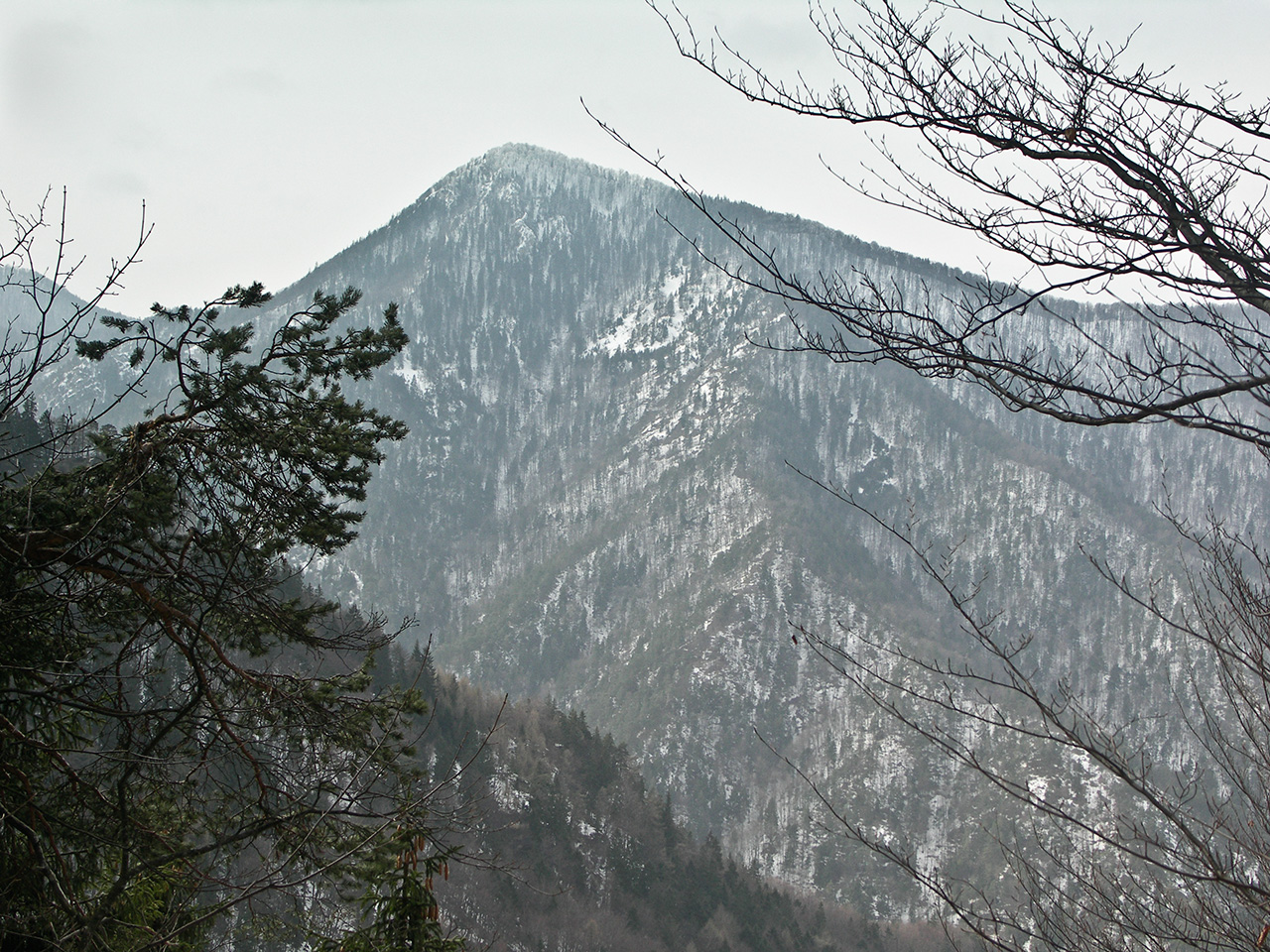
Winter view at Drieňok
