= Veľká Fatra =

Mountain range in Slovakia

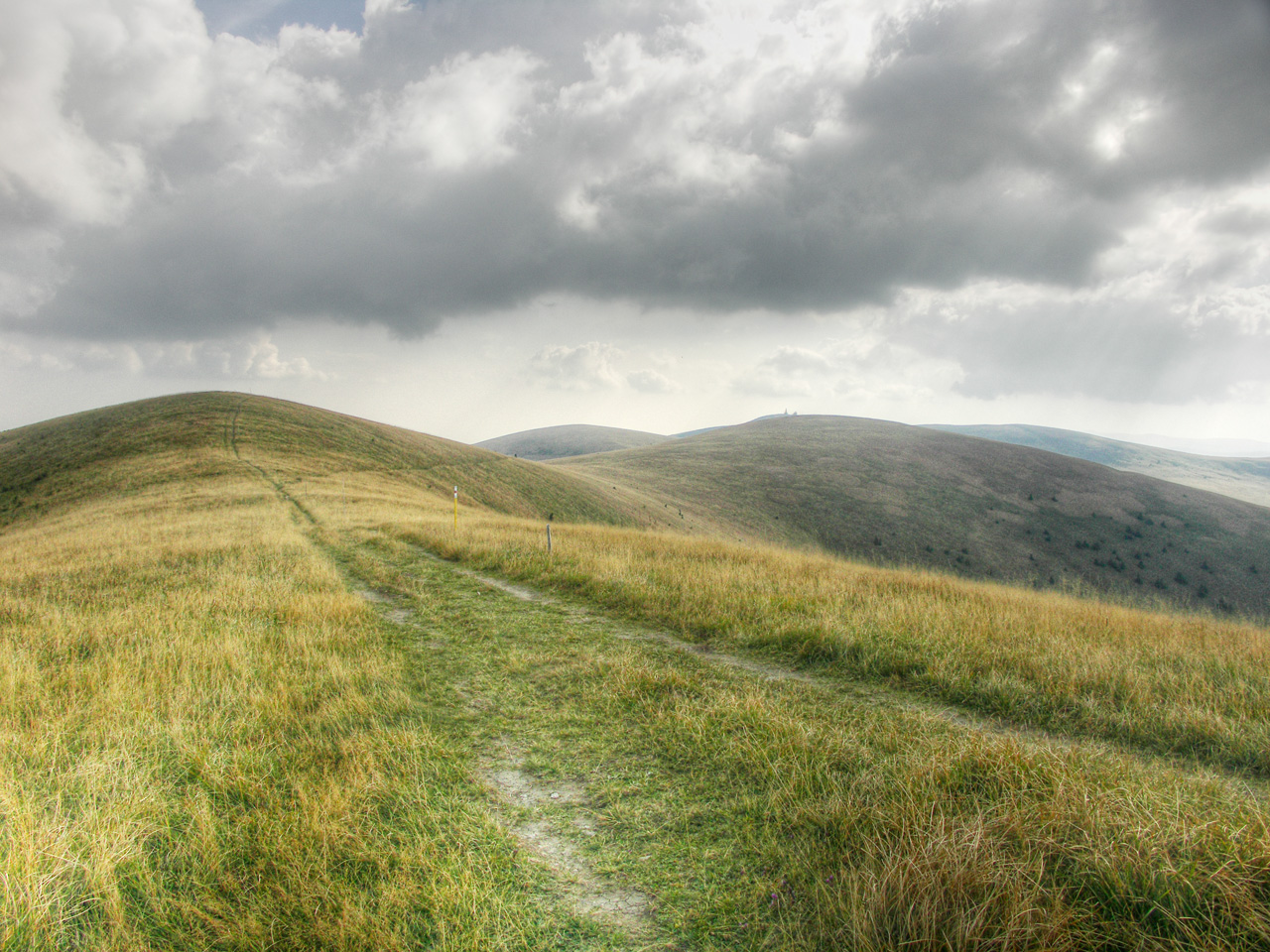
- Typical terrain of the Hôľna Fatra

Highest point
- Peak: Ostredok
- Elevation: 1,596 m (5,236 ft)
- Coordinates: 48°53′57″N 19°04′54″E

Dimensions
- Length: 45 km (28 mi) NE-SW
- Width: 20 km (12 mi) NW-SW

Geography
- Location within Slovakia
- Country: Slovakia
- Regions: Žilina; Banská Bystrica
- Districts: Ružomberok; Turčianske Teplice; Banská Bystrica
- Subdivisions: Hôľna Fatra; Braľná Fatra; Šípska Fatra; Zvolen; Revúcke podolie
- Range coordinates: 48°55′N 19°04′E
- Parent range: Fatra-Tatra Area
- Borders on: Lesser Fatra; Turiec Basin; Žiar; Kremnica Mountains; Low Tatra; Chočské vrchy

Veľká Fatra (Slovak pronunciation: [ˈʋeʎkaː ˈfatra]; also Great Fatra or Greater Fatra; Hungarian: Nagy-Fátra) is a mountain range in the Western Carpathians in Slovakia. The Veľká Fatra lie to the southeast of the better known Malá (Lesser) Fatra mountains and are less developed, as well as being lower.

== Geology ==
In the geomorphological system, it is a part of the Fatra-Tatra Area. It is situated approximately among the towns of Ružomberok, Harmanec, Turčianske Teplice and Martin. The Turiec Basin and the Lesser Fatra mountains are situated to the north west of the range and the Low Tatras mountains are in the east. It can be divided into seven parts: Šípska Fatra, Šiprúň, Lysec, Hôľna Fatra, Revúcke podolie, Zvolen and Bralná Fatra.

The highest mountain is Ostredok at 1,596 m (5,236 ft). Other notable summits of the largest Hôľna Fatra part are Krížna at 1,574.3 m (5,165 ft) and Ploská at 1,532.1 m (5,027 ft), where the main ridge divides into two. The western Turiec Ridge (Slovak: Turčiansky hrebeň) includes, for example, Borišov at 1,509.5 m (4,952 ft), and the eastern Liptov Ridge (Slovak: Liptovský hrebeň) includes, for example, Rakytov at 1,567.0 m (5,141.1 ft). Bralná Fatra includes Tlstá at 1,373.3 m (4,506 ft) and Ostrá at 1,247.0 m (4,091.2 ft) summits. The Zvolen massif (1,402.5 m (4,601 ft)) connects the Veľká Fatra Range with the Low Tatra Range. One of the largest ski resorts in Slovakia - Skipark Ružomberok and Donovaly - lies beneath it. There are several other tourist and skiing resorts in the range.

A considerable part of the range is made of various Mesozoic rocks. The central part and the main ridge are made up of non-resistant rocks (slates) and the relief is softly modeled (Ploská, Ostredok). The southern and south-western part is formed by resistant limestone and dolomite with rocky walls and reefs. The ridges are usually separated by canyon-like valleys. The most important ones are Gader Valley (Gaderská dolina) and Blatnica Valley (Blatnická dolina). The longest valley is the Ľubochňa Valley (Ľubochnianska dolina) at 25 km. Numerous karst formations are located in this area and the Harmanec Cave is one of the best known caves in Slovakia.

== Scenery ==
Nearly 90% of the area is covered by forests – beech and beech-fir forests, in some places replaced by spruce plantations and relics of pines. The area of Harmanec is the richest yew-tree site in Europe. The original natural upper borderline of forests was lowered during the Wallachian colonization. There are many extensive upland pastures, where cattle is raised in the summer.

Most of the area was protected by the Veľká Fatra Protected Landscape Area since 1973, and the most valuable parts are included in the Veľká Fatra National Park since 2002. The rest of the former protected landscape area serves as a buffer zone now.

The ruins of Blatnický and Sklabinský castles are located in this area. Also, the traditional architecture of Vlkolínec (a UNESCO's World Heritage Site) and Liptovské Revúce and the Ľubochňa and Turčianske Teplice spas can be found here.

== Viewpoints ==
- Rakytov (1,567 m)
- Krížna (1,574 m) - the best view of the southern mountains - Kremnické vrchy, Poľana, Vtáčnik
- Tlstá (1,208 m) - view of Turiec basin

== Gallery ==
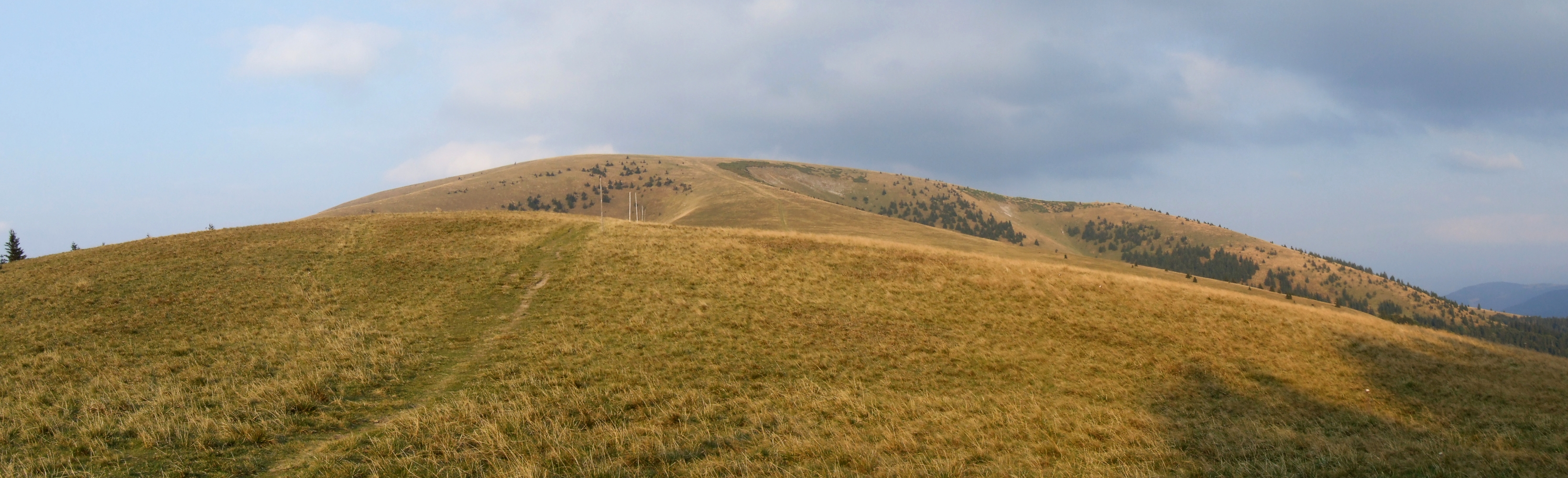
Ploská

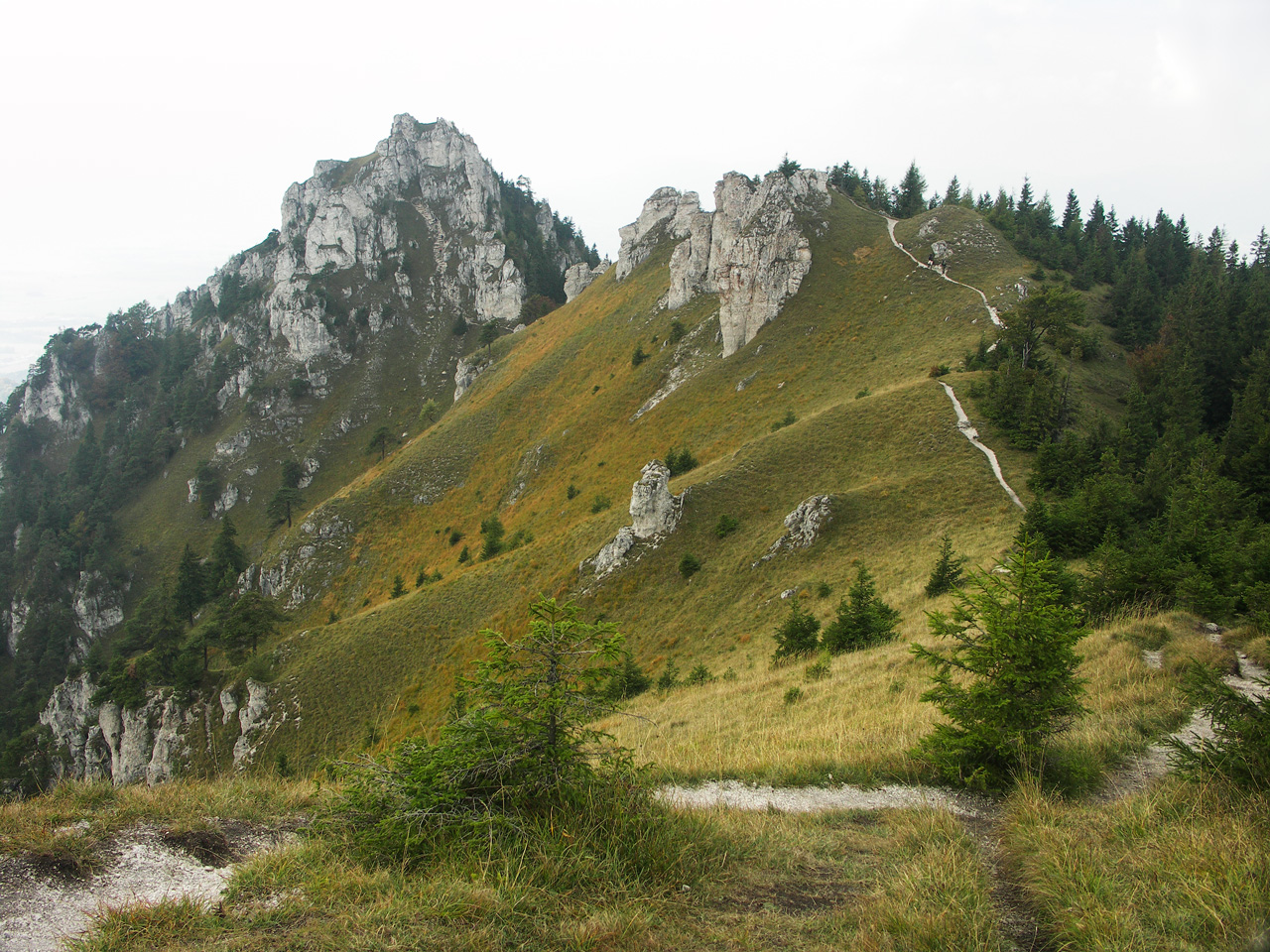
Typical rocks of the Bralná Fatra

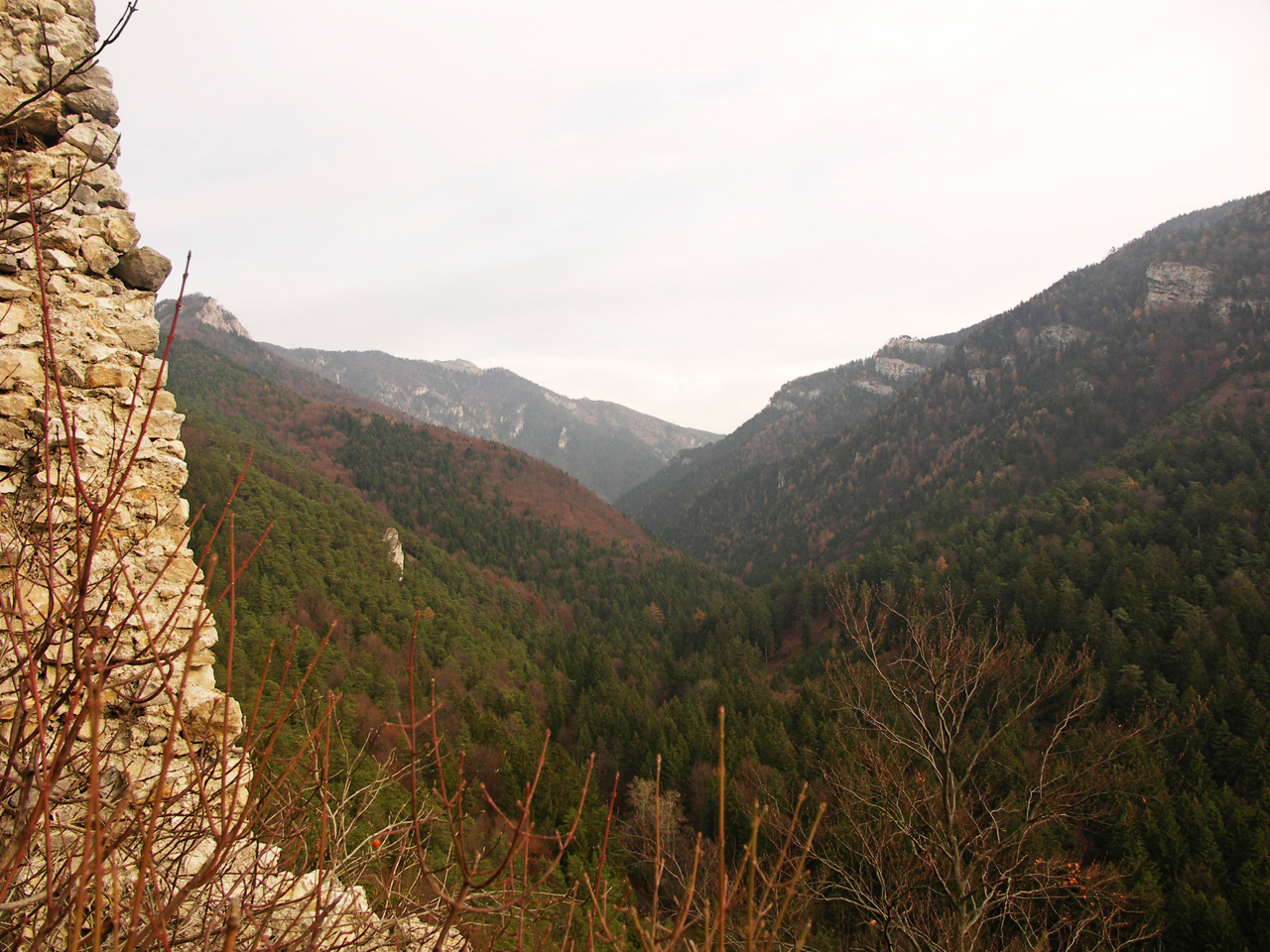
Gader Valley

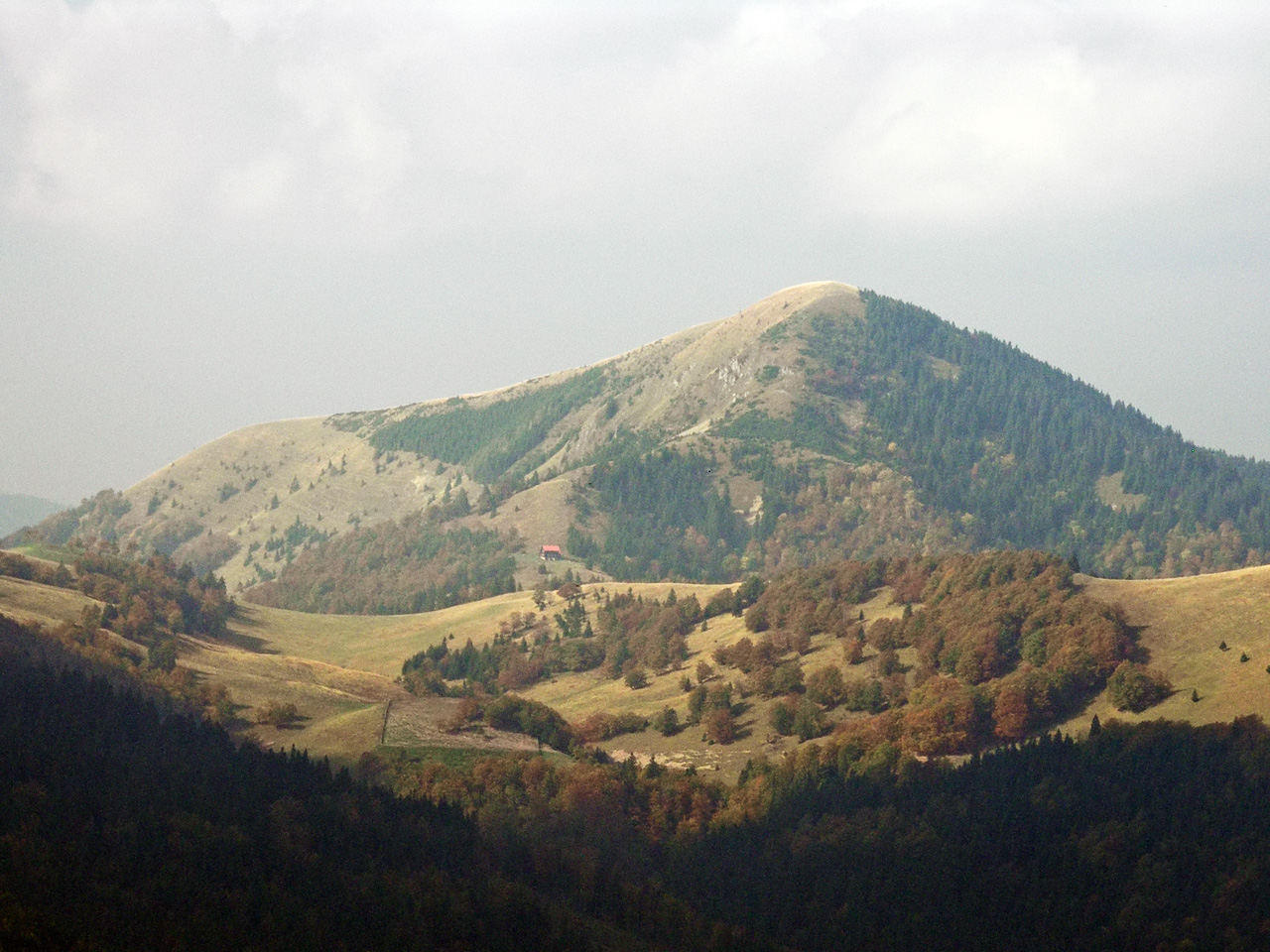
Borišov

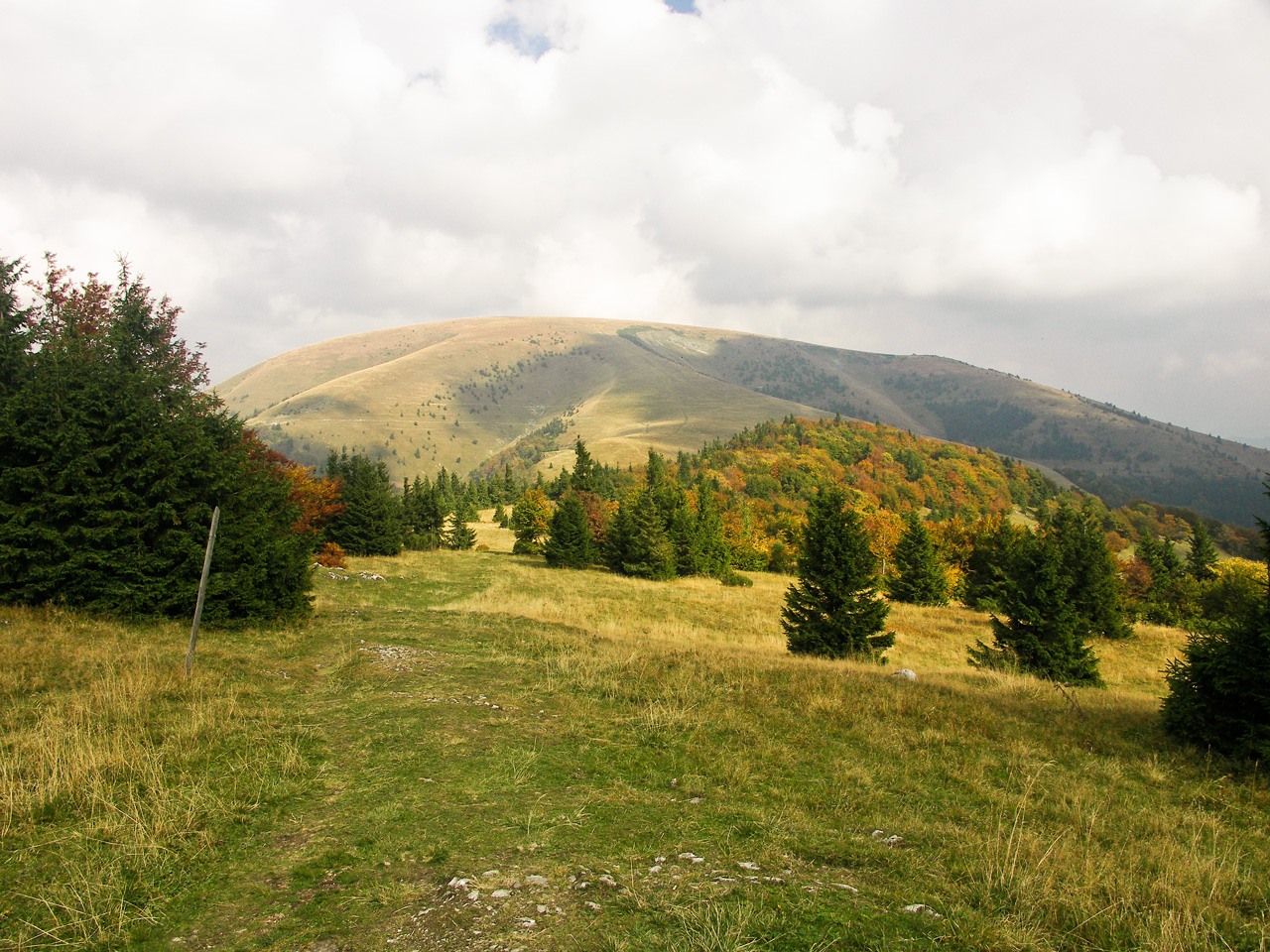
Ploská

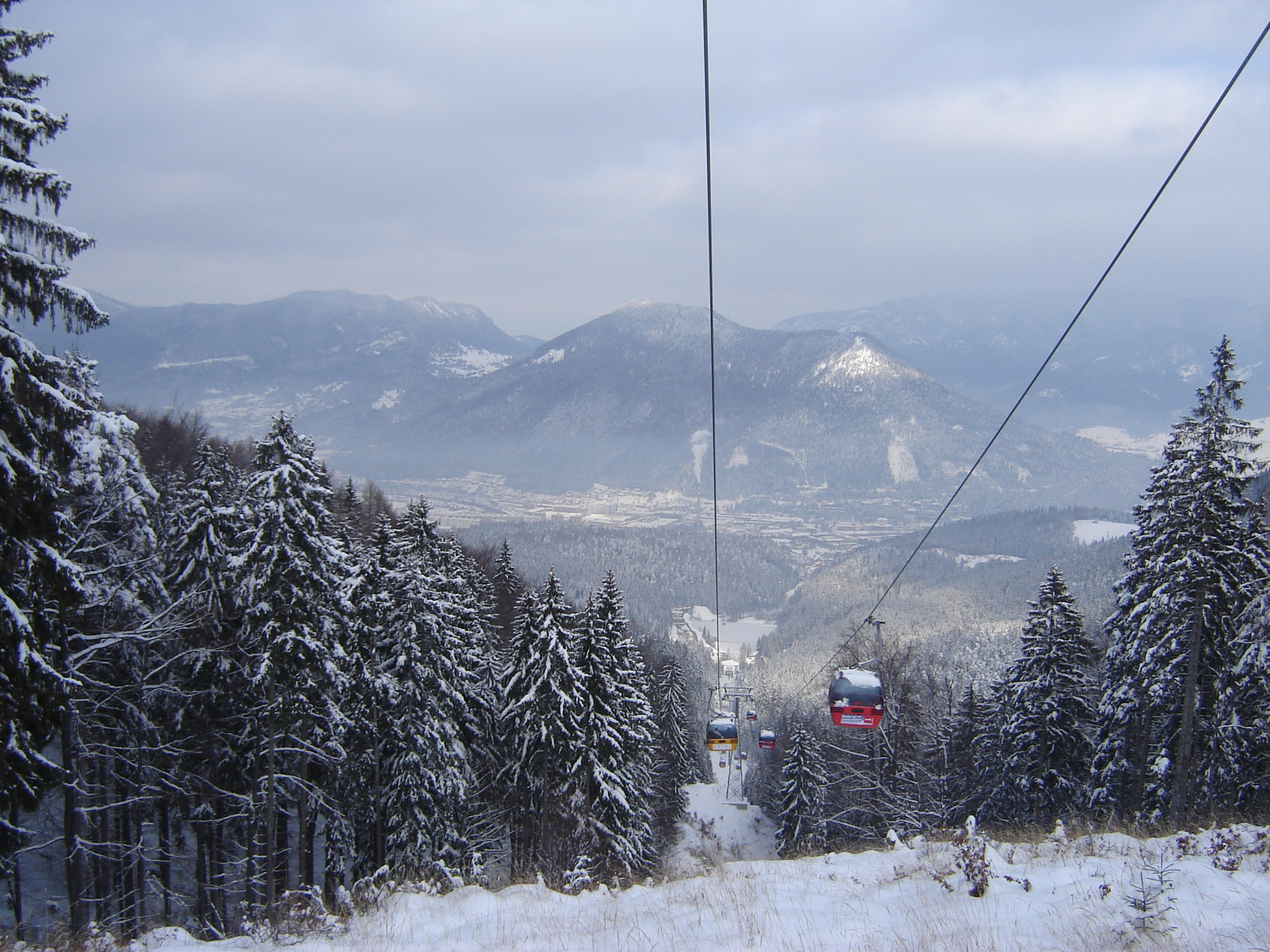
Malinné ski resort

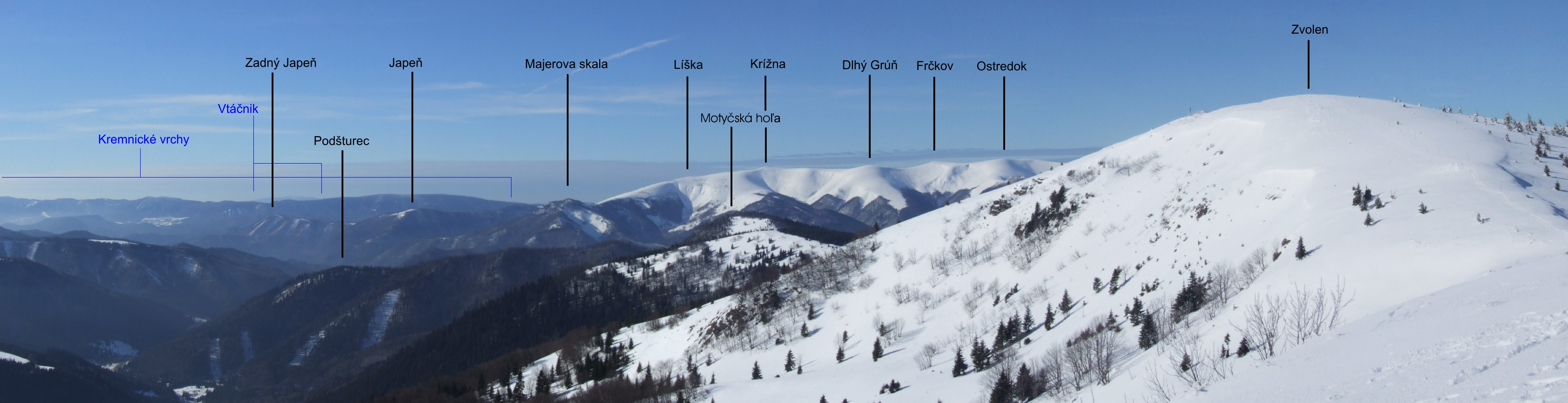
Panorama of Veľká Fatra

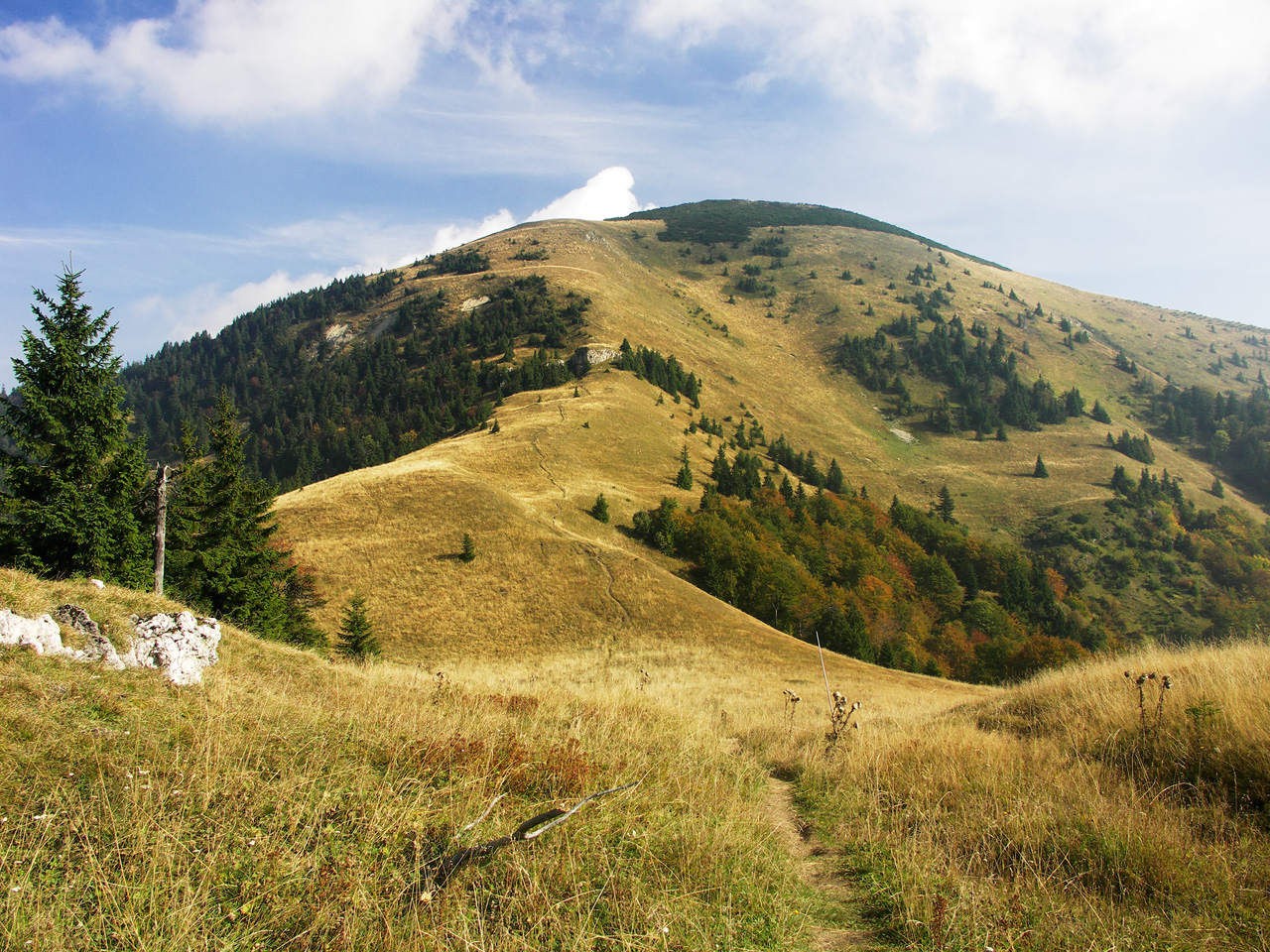
Rakytov

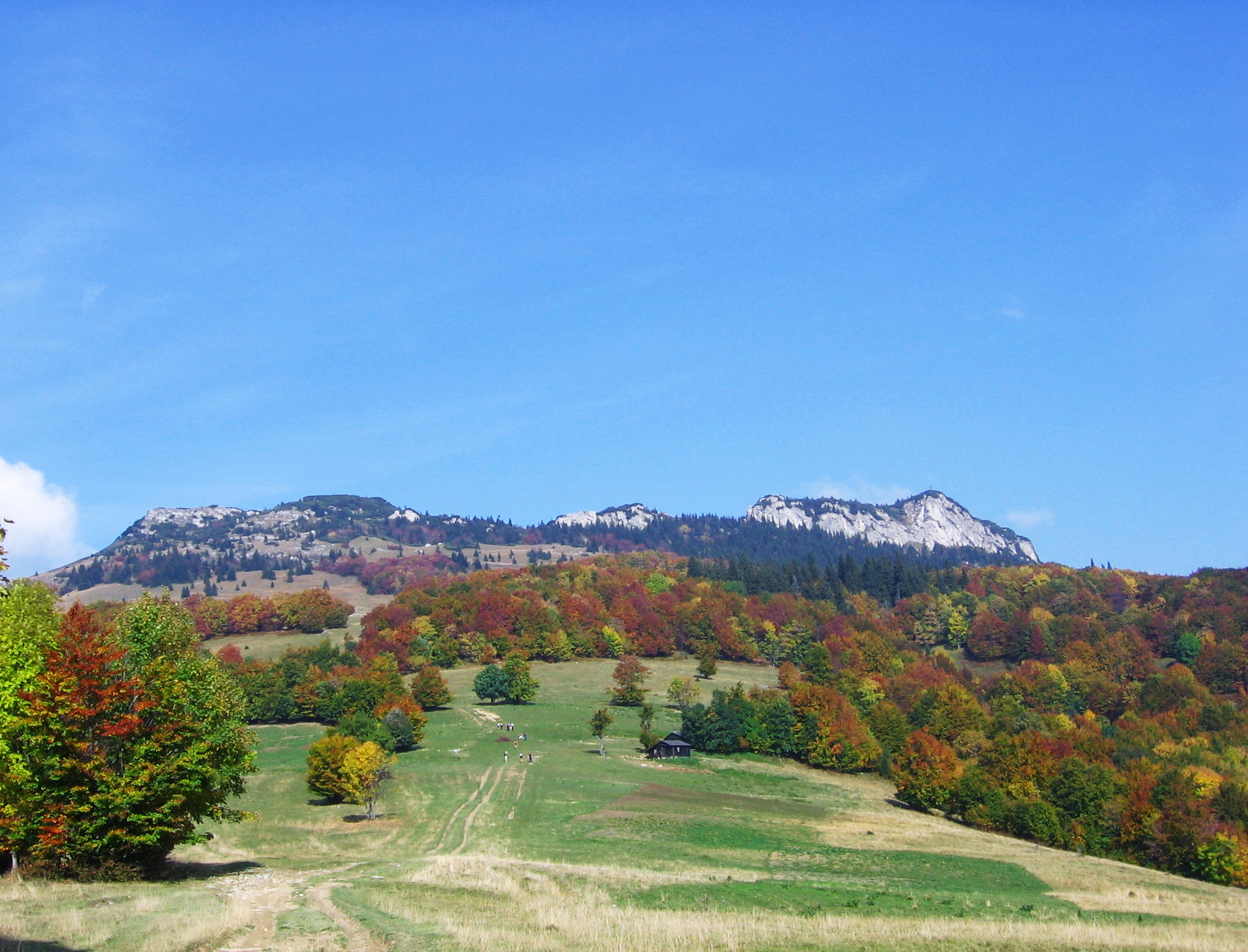
Čierny kameň

== See also ==
- Mountain Rescue Service (Slovakia)
