= Rakytov =

Mountain in Slovakia

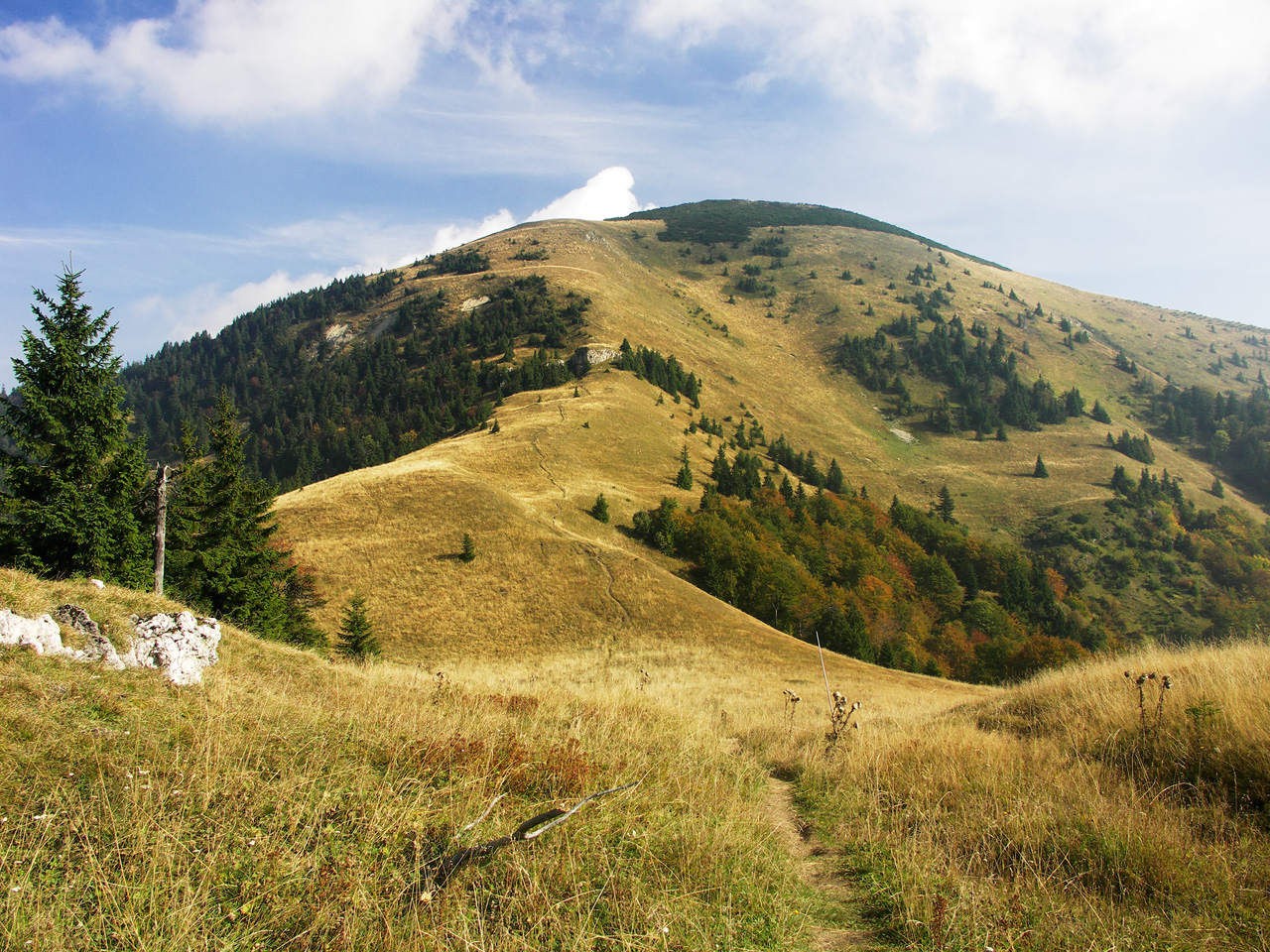

Highest point
- Elevation: 1,567 m (5,141 ft)
- Coordinates: 48°57′38″N 19°10′46″E

Geography
- Location within Slovakia
- Location: Ľubochňa
- Country: Slovakia
- Parent range: Greater Fatra

Rakytov is a mountain in the Liptov Ridge (Slovak: Liptovský hrebeň) of the Greater Fatra range in Slovakia measuring 1,567 m (5,141 ft). It has a regular pyramidal shape; the top of the mountain is deforested, in places with secondary Mountain Pine.

It is considered one of the best viewpoints in Slovakia as when there's good weather most Slovak mountains can be seen from the summit. There is a wooden cross on the summit. Rakytov is reachable by a green-marked track from Ružomberok (which continues to Ploská mountain) and by a yellow-marked track from Teplá Valley (starting at Liptovské Revúce). In the southern saddle there is a notable rock "gate".
