= Harmanecká Cave =

Cave in Central Slovakia

Coordinates: 48°49′22″N 19°01′58″E

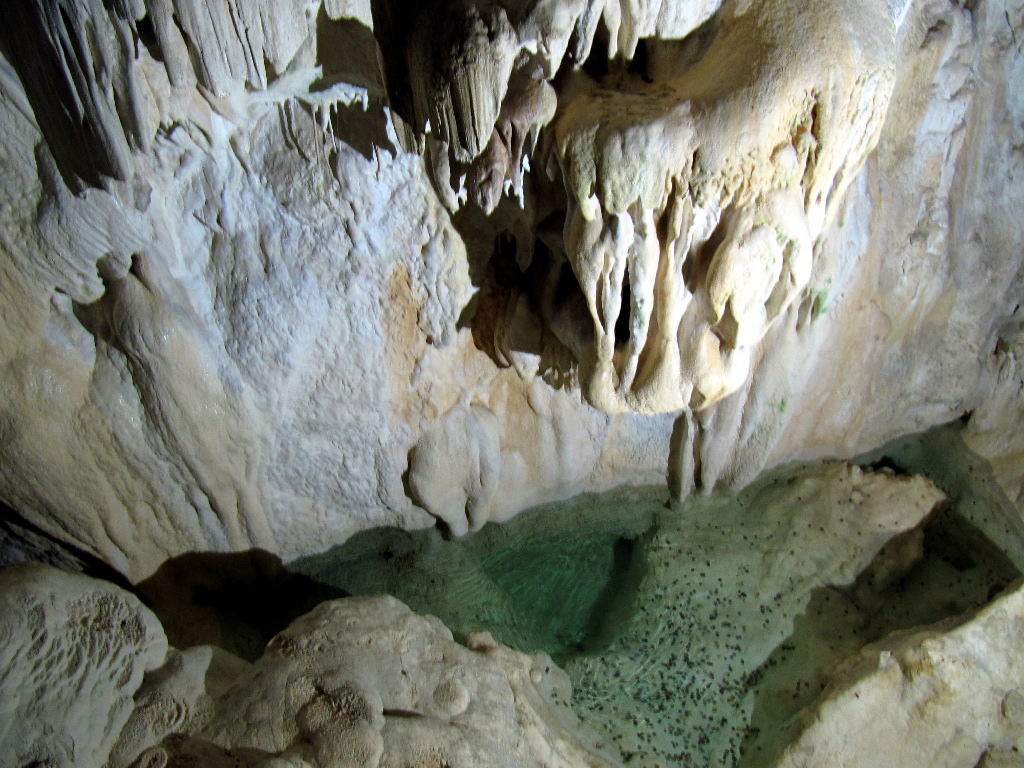
Harmanecká Cave

Harmanecká Cave or Harmanec Cave (Slovak: Harmanecká jaskyňa, Hungarian: Hermándi barlang) is a stalactite cave in Central Slovakia. It is located on the northern side of the Kotolnica massif in the Staré Hory and Kremnica mountain ranges and south of the Veľká Fatra mountains. The closest villages are Harmanec and Dolný Harmanec; Banská Bystrica is around 16 km south east of the cave. It is formed from Middle Triassic dark-grey Gutenstein limestone with an estimated age of 220 million years. The entrance to the cave is situated at an altitude of 821 m and 260 m above the bottom of the Harmanec valley.

== History ==
The entrance to the cave had long been known to local people. They used it as a shelter during bad weather and called it Izbica. But it was only on 22 June 1932 that the 18-year-old Michal Bacúrik discovered the cave. While he was doing a detailed survey of the entrance, he found a narrow fissure to the cave itself. Through this fissure he noticed a strong draft and bats were flying in and out. This made him assume that the cave spaces were located behind this fissure. At this spot the entrance door of today's cave is located. After two weeks of digging he was able to enter the first parts of the cave. Soon the speleologists discovered other parts of the cave. The cave was opened to the public in 1950, and in 1972 it was registered as a national monument.

== Description ==
Up to now, more than 2,700 m of underground passages have been discovered but only 720 m are open to the public. The air temperature varies between 5.8 and 6.4 °C. The humidity is between 92 and 94 percent.

=== The Explorer's Dome ===
The Explorer's Dome is the first dome that is reached by visitors through the artificial passage from the entrance. The dome holds many different forms of sinter decoration like stalactites, stalagmites and sinter columns. The sinter decoration is made from atmospheric water filtering through the cave roof and by precipitation of calcite from water. A one cubic millimeter of dripstone decoration in this cave takes approximately 10 to 15 years to grow.

=== The White Gothic Dome ===
The White Gothic Dome is named after the shape of the ceiling which resembles a Gothic vault and also after the characteristic white colour. Because the cave roof is formed from chemically clean white calcite, the decoration has a pure white colour. This white colouring is very specific for the Harmanec cave. If the roof contained different elements of metals it would be more colourful. A sinter waterfall called the "Tongue of the Mother-in-Law" can be seen hanging from the ceiling. These parts of the cave as far as the end of the White Gothic Dome were discovered by Michal Bacurik. The other parts were discovered in 1938 by Ondroušek and Kovalčik.

=== The Dome of Pagados ===
The Dome of Pagados is the biggest area of the cave open to the public. It is 28m high and consists of different halls. It was named after the big stalagmites in the shape of pagodas which reach between 12 and 15m in height. This part of the cave was flooded many times and the water level lines on the walls are evidence of these floods. On one of the walls of the Dome of Pagados very rich sinter decorations can be found. In the Pease Hall the main feature is a Stone vase, the symbol of the Harmanec cave.

=== The Riverbed ===
The Riverbed is the lowest part of the cave that is open to the public and is located 30m below the cave entrance. Above this room lies a 70m layer of limestone. The Riverbed was named after the shape of this passages which are proof of the erosion activities of the underground waters. Only during spring a lake can be seen on the bottom of the Riverbed.

=== The Tall Gothic Dome ===
The Tall Gothic Dome measures 20m in height. On one of the walls big sinter decorations in the shape of draperies and waterwalls were formed. They are made of soft sinter matter, also known as rockmilk. Rockmilk is a specific cave fill made of crystalline calcite and it contains 40-80 percent water.

=== The Labyrinth Dome ===
The Labyrinth Dome is 100m in length, 18m in width and 12m in height. It is named after the explorers Bacurik and Babjak who lost their way in this area. The area was formed as a result of the ceiling collapsing.

== Fauna ==
Because of the security, stable temperature and optimal humidity, many different animals live in these spaces. The most common animals are bats. They generally stay in the cave in the winter months and during their hibernation they subsist on the fat stored underneath their skin. In the Harmanec cave 10 bat species have been identified so far. The most common of these species are the Greater Mouse-Eared bat and the Lesser Mouse-Eared bat. They can be found in groups of up to 1200 individuals. Invertebrates can also be found in these underground areas.

== See also ==
- List of caves in Slovakia
