= Tlstá =

Mountain in Slovakia

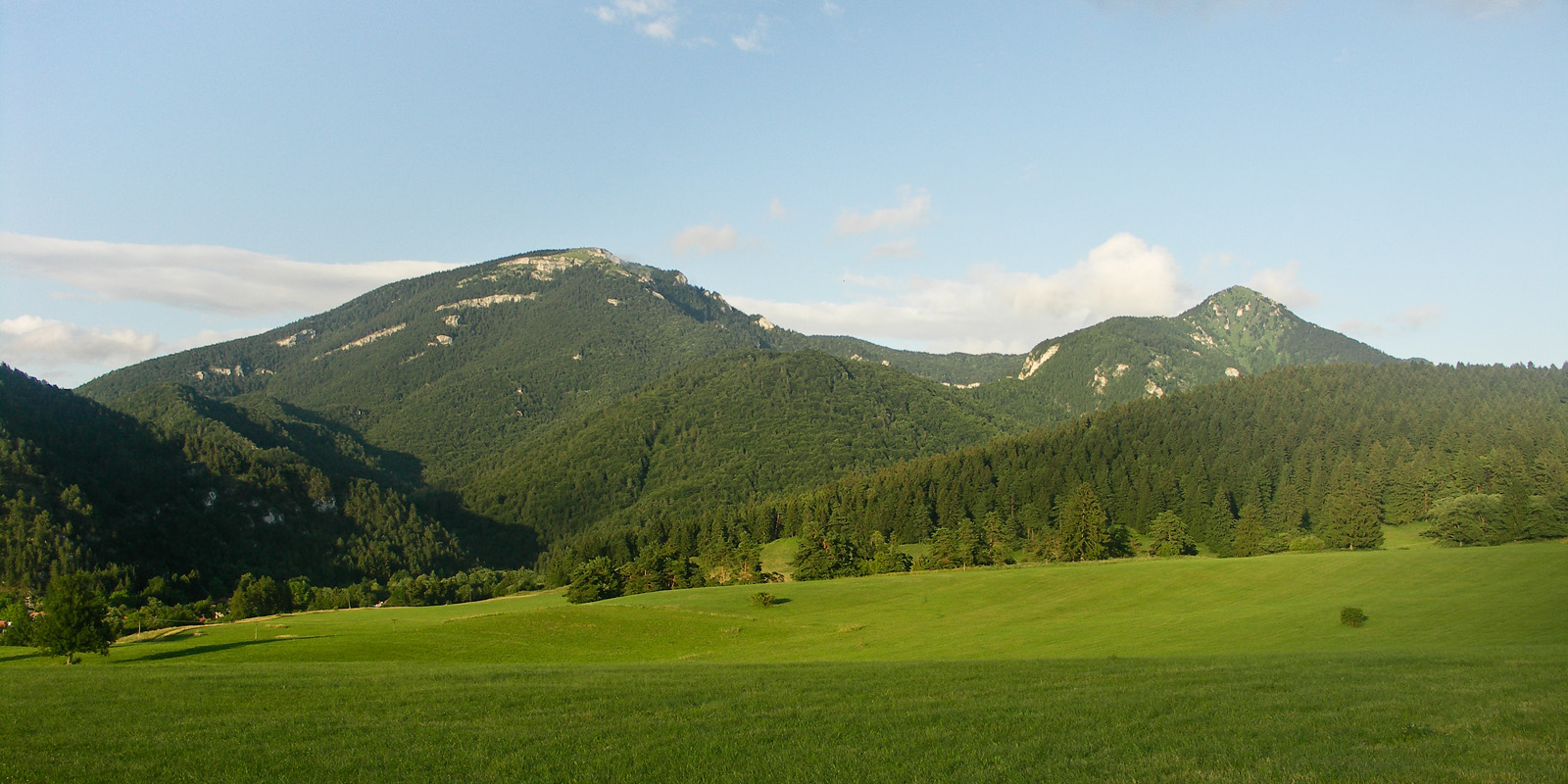
- Tlstá (left) and Ostrá (right) mountains

Highest point
- Elevation: 1,373.3 m (4,506 ft)
- Coordinates: 48°56′28″N 19°05′22″E

Naming
- Etymology: fat in Slovak

Geography
- Location within Slovakia
- Location: Martin, Žilina, Slovakia
- Parent range: Greater Fatra

Geology
- Mountain type(s): limestone and dolomite

Tlstá (meaning fat in Slovak) is a mountain in the Bralná Fatra part of the Greater Fatra Range, measuring 1,373.3 m (4,506 ft). It is located over the Turiec Valley, rising steeply nearly 1,000 m (3,300 ft) above the valley bottom. It has rugged slopes with many rock spires and rock terraces under the grass-covered summit. With its well-preserved forests, rare plants and many karst caves in the massif, the mountain and its surrounding area were declared a National Nature Reserve in 1981, covering an area of 30.66 km^{2} (11.84 sq mi). Together with the opposite Ostrá Mountain and Gader Valley beneath them, they create one of the most valuable and picturesque parts of the Greater Fatra Range.
