= Harmanec =

Harmanec Hermánd
- Municipality
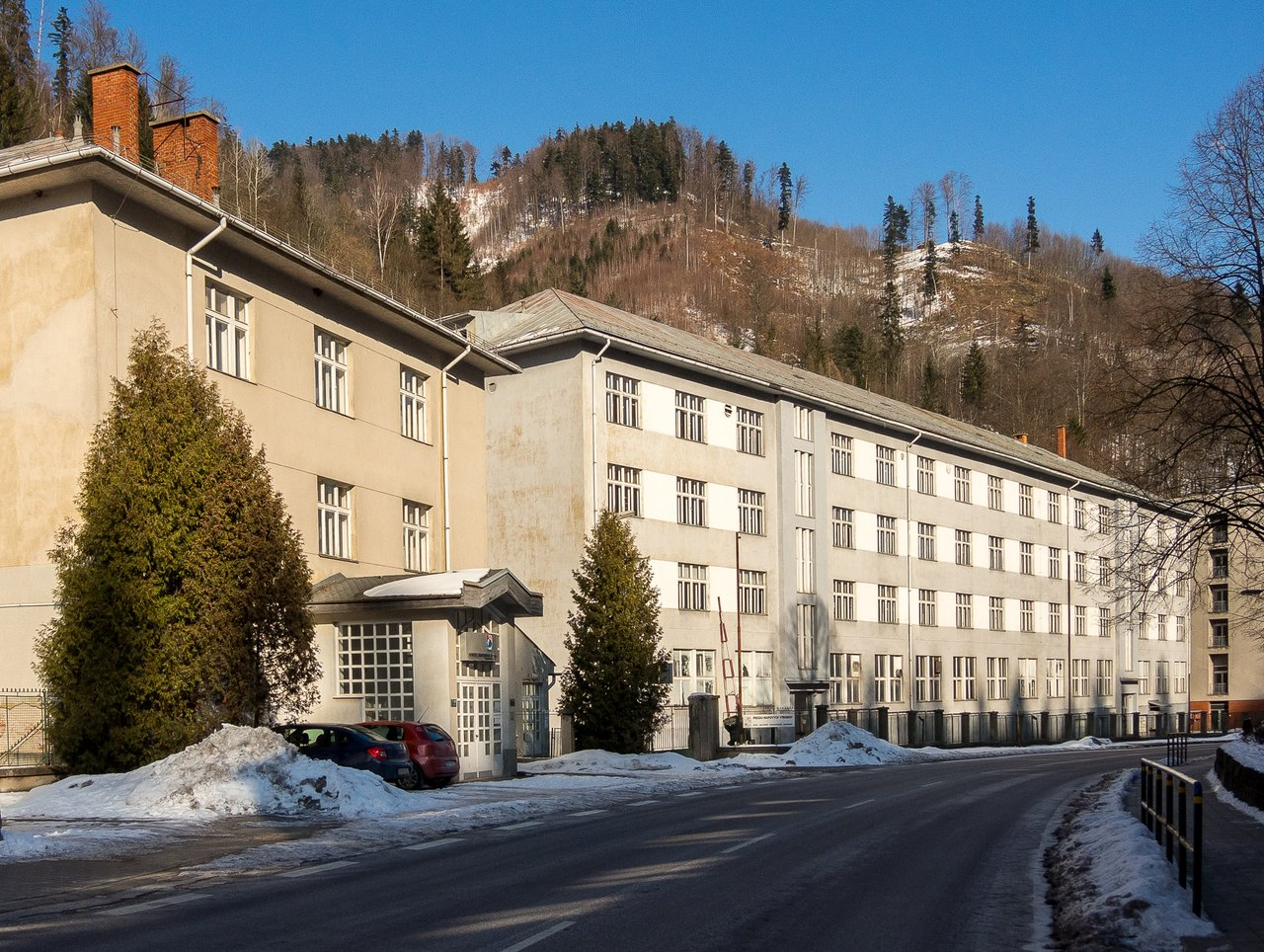
- Former buildings of the Military Cartographic Institute

- Flag

- Location of Harmanec in the Banská Bystrica Region Location of Harmanec in Slovakia
- Coordinates: 48.82°N 19.05°E
- Country: Slovakia
- Region: Banská Bystrica Region
- District: Banská Bystrica District
- First mentioned: 1957

Area
  - Total: 7.75 km^{2} (2.99 sq mi)
- Elevation: 441 m (1,447 ft)

Population (2025)
  - Total: 808
- Time zone: UTC+1 (CET)
  - Summer (DST): UTC+2 (CEST)
- Postal code: 976 03
- Area code: +421 48
- Vehicle registration plate (until 2022): BB
- Website: www.harmanec.sk

Harmanec (Hungarian: Hermánd) is a village and municipality in Banská Bystrica District in the Banská Bystrica Region of central Slovakia.

== History ==
The village first appears in historical records circa 1540.

== Geography ==
The municipality lies at an altitude of 441 metres (1,447 ft) and covers an area of 7.75 km^{2} (2.99 sq mi) (2025).

== Population ==
Population statistic (10 years)
Year	1995	2005	2015	2025
Count	928	909	861	808
Difference		−2.04%	−5.28%	−6.15%

Population statistic
Year	2024	2025
Count	827	808
Difference		−2.29%

It has a population of 808 people (31 December 2025).

=== Ethnicity ===
Census 2021 (1+ %)
Ethnicity	Number	Fraction
Slovak	746	87.97%
Not found out	96	11.32%
Romani	14	1.65%
Total	848	

In year 2021 was 848 people by ethnicity 746 as Slovak, 96 as Not found out, 14 as Romani, 8 as Czech, 4 as Russian, 3 as Hungarian and 2 as German.

Note on population: The difference values of population numbers in the table "Population statistic" and in the sections "Ethnicity" & "Religion" is caused by the use of various statistical methods.

=== Religion ===
Census 2021 (1+ %)
Religion	Number	Fraction
Roman Catholic Church	362	42.69%
None	317	37.38%
Not found out	100	11.79%
Evangelical Church	39	4.6%
Greek Catholic Church	9	1.06%
Total	848	

In year 2021 was 848 people by religion 362 from Roman Catholic Church, 317 from None, 100 from Not found out, 39 from Evangelical Church, 9 from Greek Catholic Church, 5 from Christian Congregations in Slovakia, 3 from Jehovah's Witnesses, 3 from Ad hoc movements, 2 from Other and not ascertained christian church, 2 from Apostolic Church, 1 from Calvinist Church, 1 from Paganism and natural spirituality, 1 from Hinduism, 1 from United Methodist Church, 1 from Church of the Brethren and 1 from Buddhism.

== Sights ==
The village is located close to the Harmanec Cave.
