= Ostrá (Nymburk District) =

- Municipality
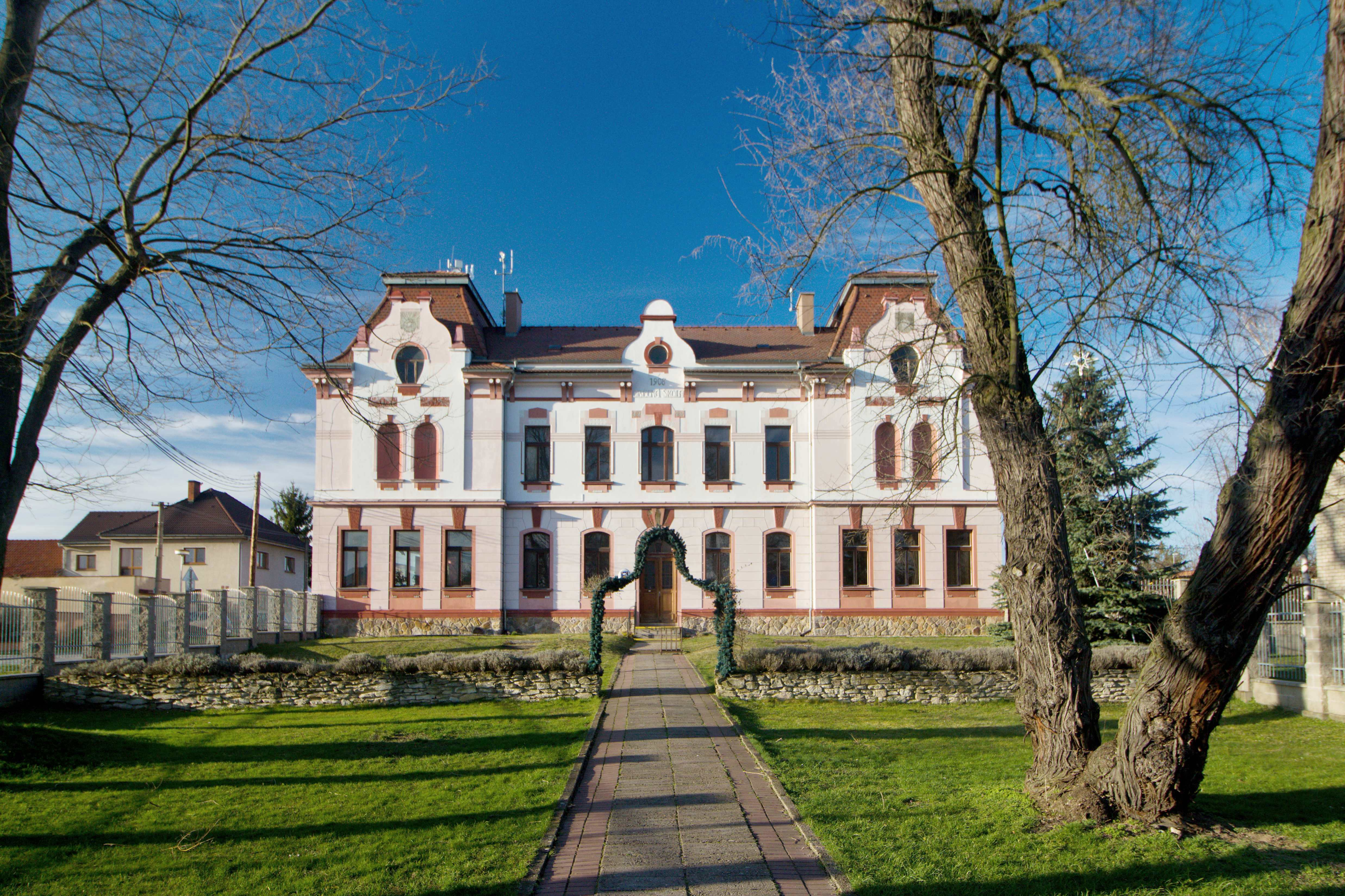
- Primary school

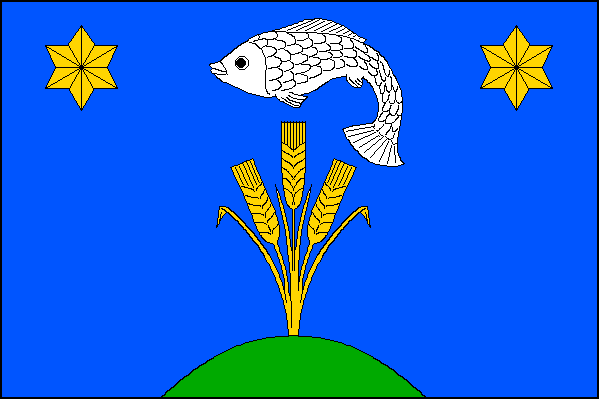
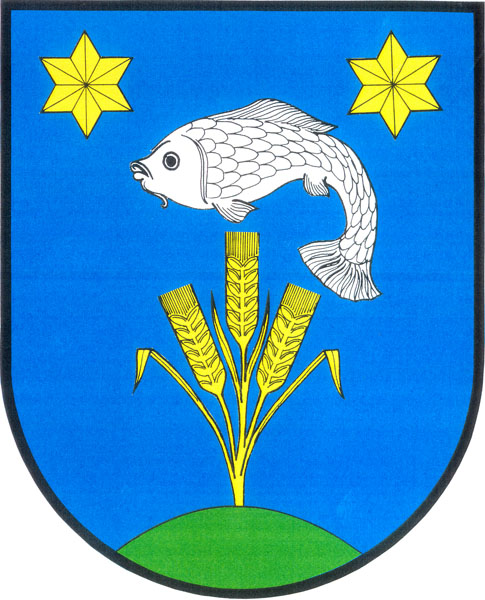
- Flag Coat of arms

- Location in the Czech Republic
- Coordinates: 50°10′50″N 14°53′35″E
- Country: Czech Republic
- Region: Central Bohemian
- District: Nymburk
- First mentioned: 1503

Area
  - Total: 11.08 km^{2} (4.28 sq mi)
- Elevation: 179 m (587 ft)

Population (2026-01-01)
  - Total: 697
  - Density: 62.9/km^{2} (163/sq mi)
- Time zone: UTC+1 (CET)
  - Summer (DST): UTC+2 (CEST)
- Postal code: 289 22
- Website: www.ostra.cz

Ostrá is a municipality and village in Nymburk District in the Central Bohemian Region of the Czech Republic. It has about 700 inhabitants.

== Administrative division ==
Ostrá consists of two municipal parts (in brackets population according to the 2021 census):

- Ostrá (542)
- Šnepov (77)

== Demographics ==
Historical population
Year	Pop.	±%
1869	585	—
1880	674	+15.2%
1890	671	−0.4%
1900	640	−4.6%
1910	675	+5.5%
1921	768	+13.8%
1930	662	−13.8%
1950	647	−2.3%
1961	651	+0.6%
1970	559	−14.1%
1980	455	−18.6%
1991	384	−15.6%
2001	353	−8.1%
2011	505	+43.1%
2021	619	+22.6%
Source: Censuses
