= Ostrá (Veľká Fatra) =

Mountain in Slovakia

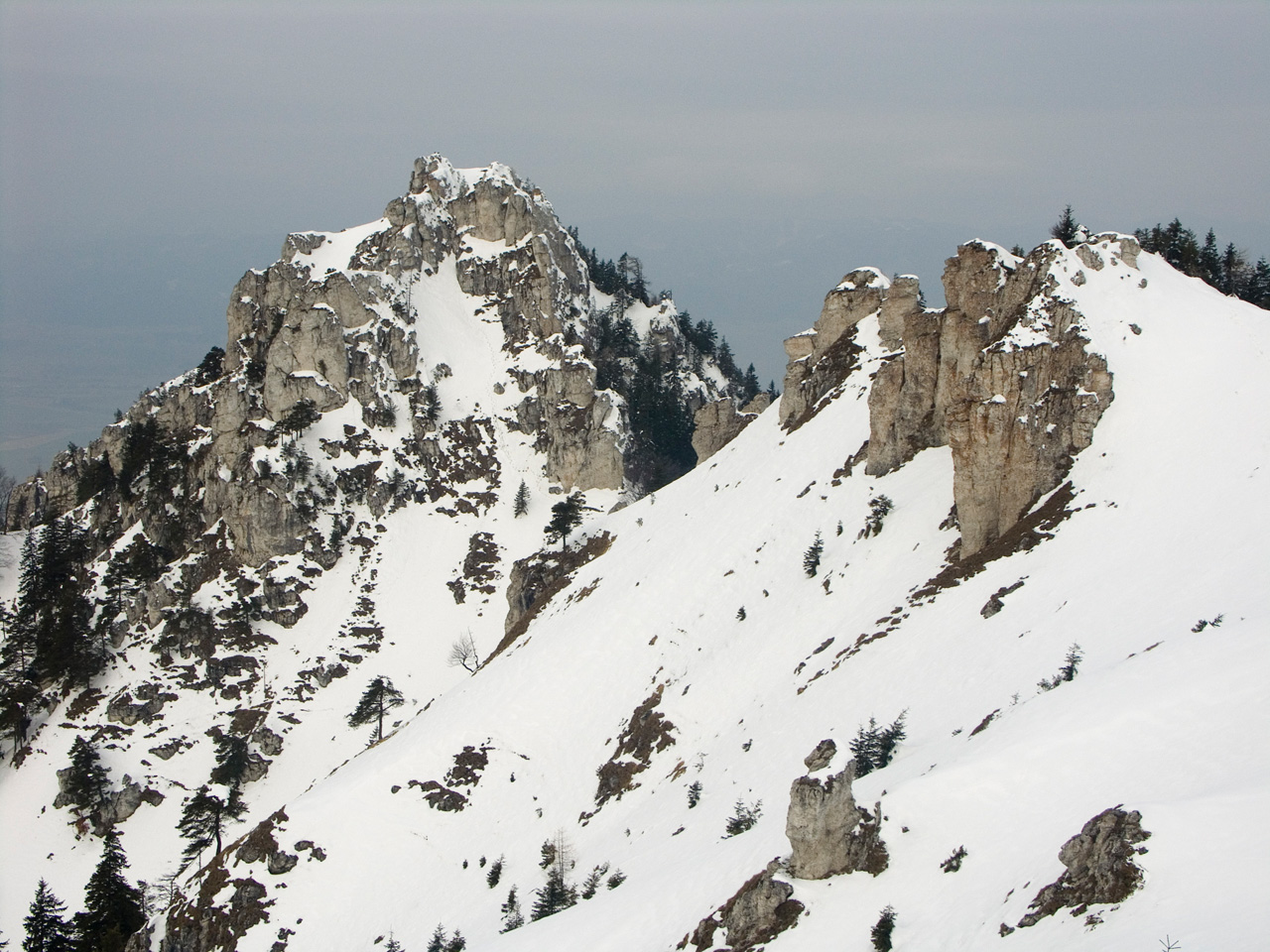

Highest point
- Elevation: 1,247 m (4,091 ft)
- Coordinates: 48°55′08″N 18°58′00″E

Naming
- Etymology: sharp in Slovak

Geography
- Location within Slovakia
- Location: Martin, Žilina, Slovakia
- Parent range: Greater Fatra

Geology
- Mountain type: limestone

Ostrá (meaning Sharp in Slovak) is a mountain in the Greater Fatra Range of Slovakia measuring 1,247 m (4,091.2 ft). It has two very rugged summits with an excellent view over the Turiec Valley and the opposite Tlstá Mountain.
