= Levoča, Spiš Castle and the associated cultural monuments =

Levoča, Spišský Hrad and the Associated Cultural Monuments
UNESCO World Heritage Site
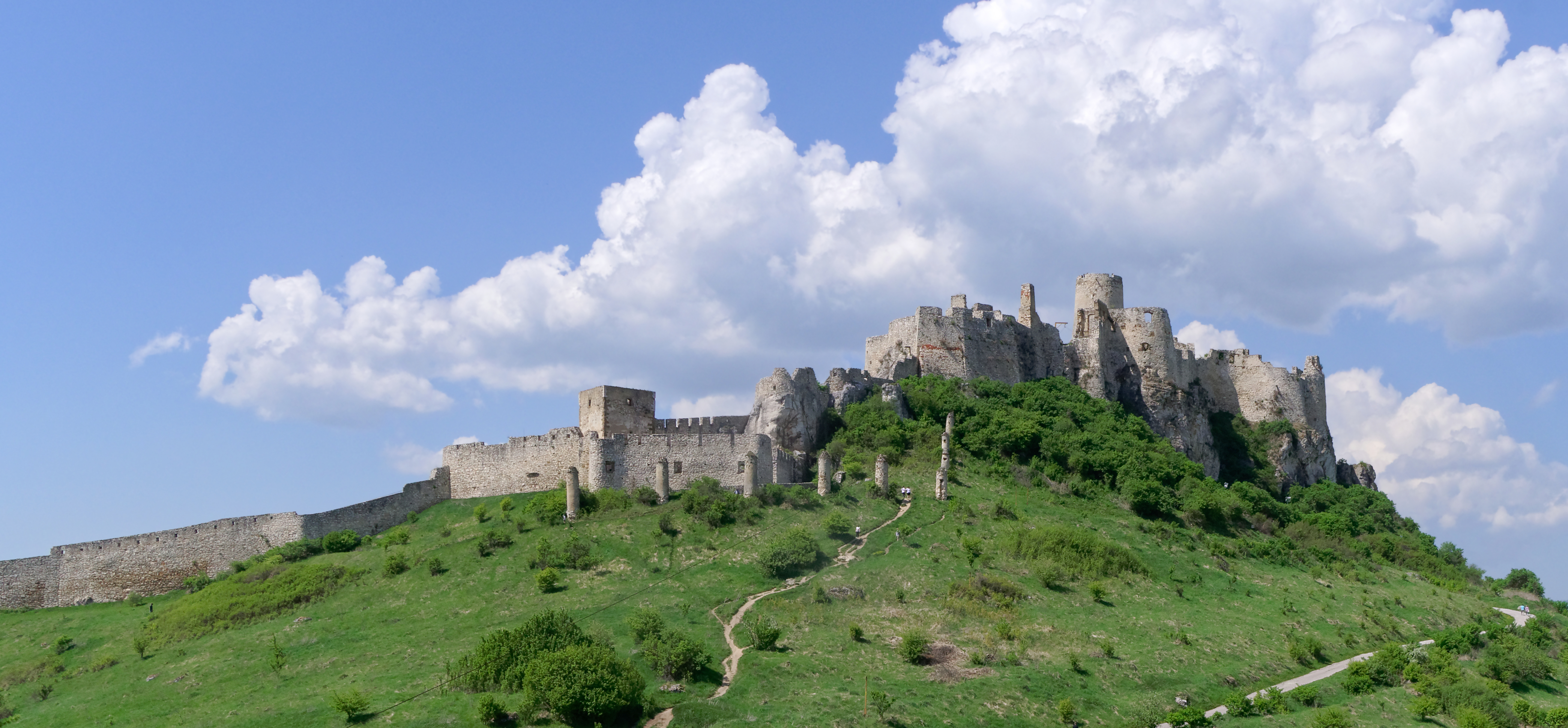
- Spiš Castle

- Location within Slovakia
- Location: Prešov Region, Slovakia
- Includes: 1. Levoča and the work of Master Paul in Spiš; 2. Spišský Hrad and its Associated Cultural Monuments
- Criteria: Cultural: (iv)
- Reference: 620bis
- Inscription: 1993 (17th Session)
- Extensions: 2009
- Area: 1,351.2252 ha (3,338.950 acres)
- Buffer zone: 12,580.6784 ha (31,087.533 acres)
- Coordinates: 48°59′58″N 20°46′03″E

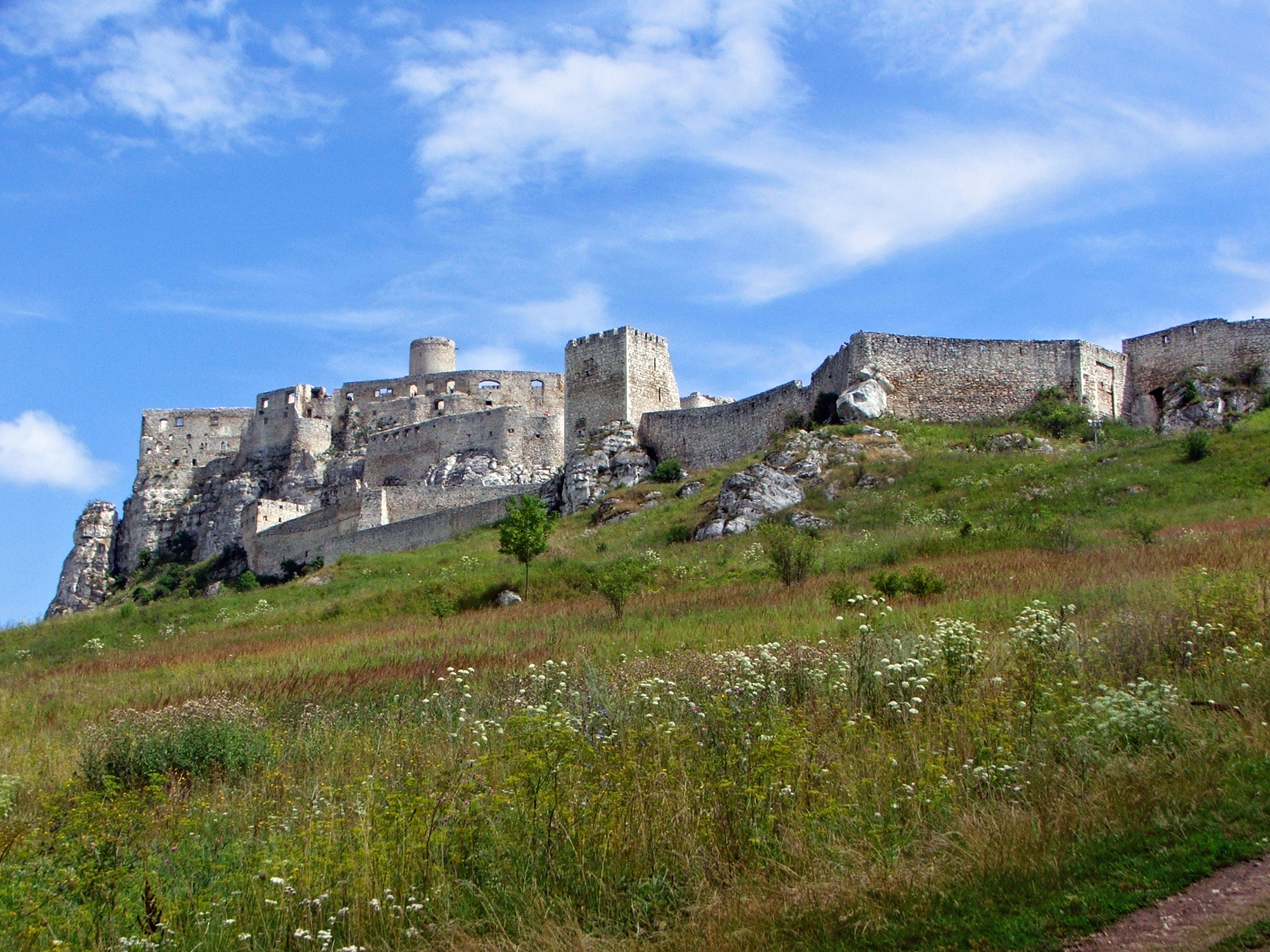
Spiš Castle

The ruins of Spiš Castle is one of the largest castle sites in Central Europe. The castle is situated above the town of Spišské Podhradie and the village of Žehra that with adjacent ecclesiastical town Spišská Kapitula form components of the UNESCO World Heritage Site. In 2009, the site was extended to include the famous altar by Master Paul of Levoča and the historic centre of Levoča with many well-preserved Renaissance buildings.

== Spiš Castle ==
Built in the 12th century, it was the political, administrative, economic and cultural centre of Szepes county. Before 1464, it was owned by Hungarian kings, afterwards (until 1528) by the Szapolyai family, the Thurzo family (1531–1635), the Csáky family (1638–1945), and (since 1945) by the state.

Originally a Romanesque stone castle with fortifications, a two-story Romanesque palace and a three nave Romanesque-Gothic basilica were constructed in the area by the second half of the 13th century. A second extramural settlement was built in the 14th century, which doubled the castle area. The castle was completely rebuilt in the 15th century. The castle walls were heightened and a third extramural settlement was constructed. A late Gothic chapel was added around 1470. The Szapolyai clan performed late Gothic transformations, which made the upper castle into a comfortable family residence, typical of late Renaissance residences of the 16th and 17th centuries. In 1780, the castle burned down and has been in ruins ever since. The castle was partly reconstructed in the second half of the 20th century, and extensive archaeological research was carried out on the site.

== Levoča ==
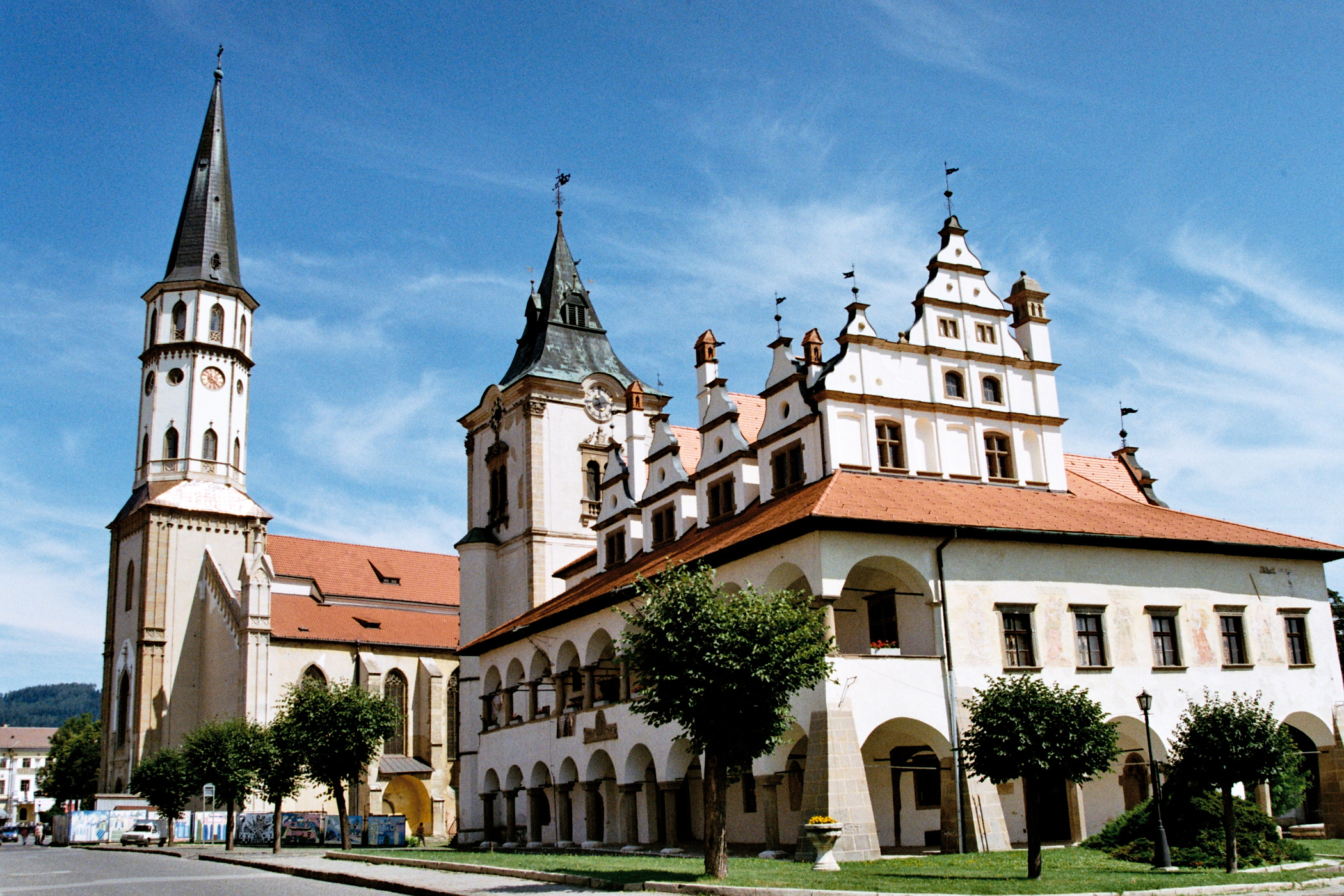
Town hall and Basilica of St. James

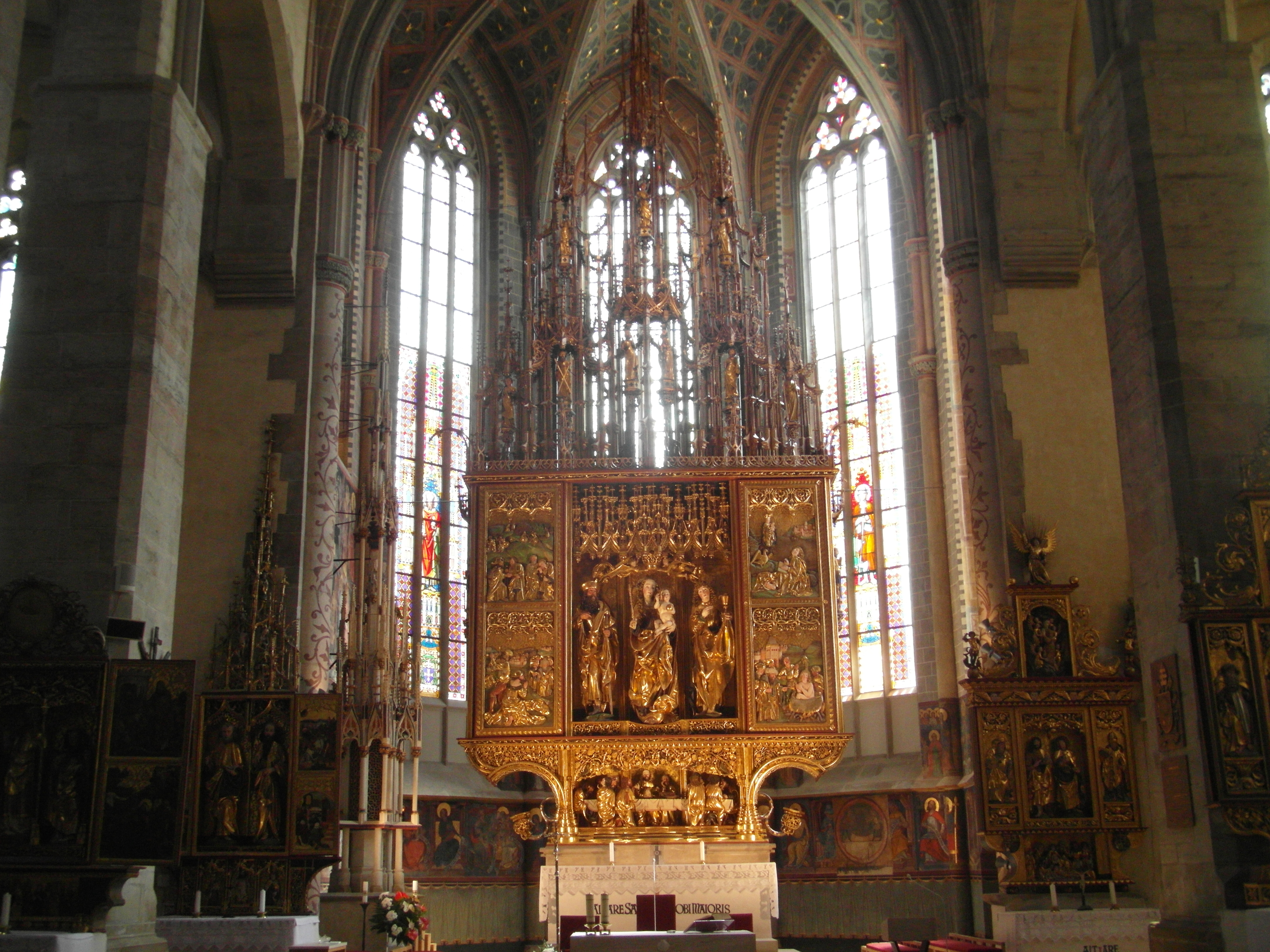
Main altar in St. James

The old medieval town of the Levoča (Hungarian: Lőcse, German: Leutschau) is still surrounded by most of its 2,5 km long city walls. The main entrance to the old town is via the monumental Košice Gate, with the other two preserved namely Menhard, and the Polish Gate. The town square boasts three major monuments:

- Old Town Hall (15th–17th century)
- Lutheran church (1837)
- Basilica of St. James

The square is very well preserved and contains a number of striking buildings which were the town-houses of the local nobility in the late Middle Ages. Also notable in the square is the wrought-iron 'Cage of Shame', dating back to the 17th century, used for public punishment of miscreants. A plaque on one of the houses records the printing and publication in the town of the most famous work of Jan Comenius, the Orbis Pictus. The second biggest church in Slovakia, the Basilica of St. James from the 14th century, houses a magnificent late-Gothic wooden carved altar, officially the highest Gothic wooden altar in the World (18.62 m high), created by Master Paul around 1506-1517.

== Spišská Kapitula ==
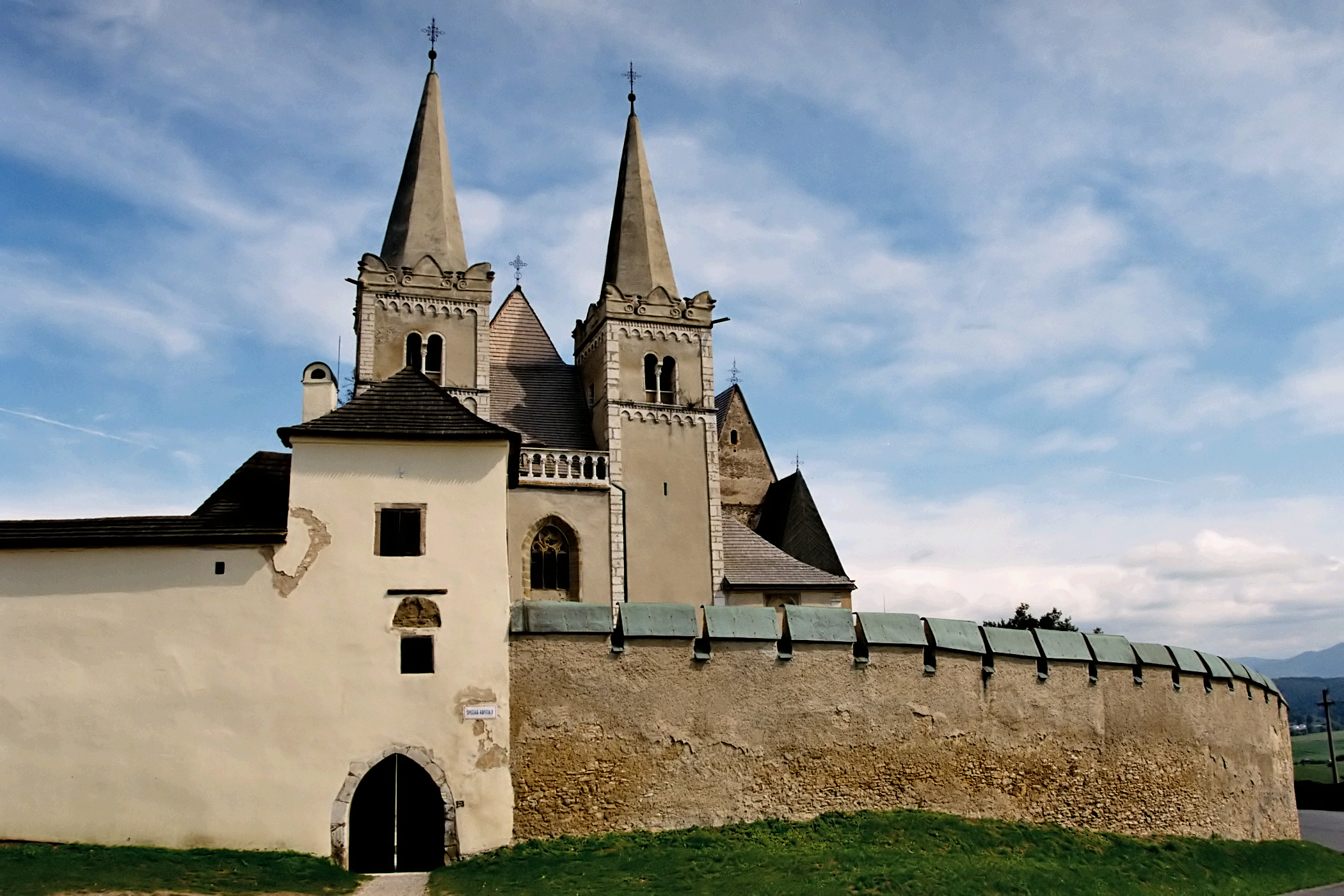
Cathedral of St. Martin

This is an exceptionally well-preserved ecclesiastical town overlooking the Spiš Castle. The town consists of the Cathedral of St. Martin, a former monastery, a seminary, and a single street with some 30 houses, all of medieval construction and enclosed by a wall build between 1662 and 1665 with Upper and Lower Gates. The cathedral was built between 1245 and 1273 in the Romanesque style with subsequent Gothic extensions. It is one of the largest and most interesting Romanesque monuments in Slovakia. It contains many mediaeval carved altars and is the resting place of many lords of Spiš Castle. Its wall paintings from 1317 depict the coronation of king Charles Robert of Anjou.

== Frescos in a church in Žehra ==
The Church of Holy Spirit at Žehra dates from 1274 and contains wall paintings of the 13th and 14th centuries.

== Spišské Podhradie ==
The town situated at the foot of the hill of Spiš Castle contains a number of Renaissance merchants' houses. It also has one of the few remaining synagogue buildings (now disused) in the region.

== See also ==
- List of castles in Slovakia
- Spiš
- Slovak Paradise

== Gallery ==
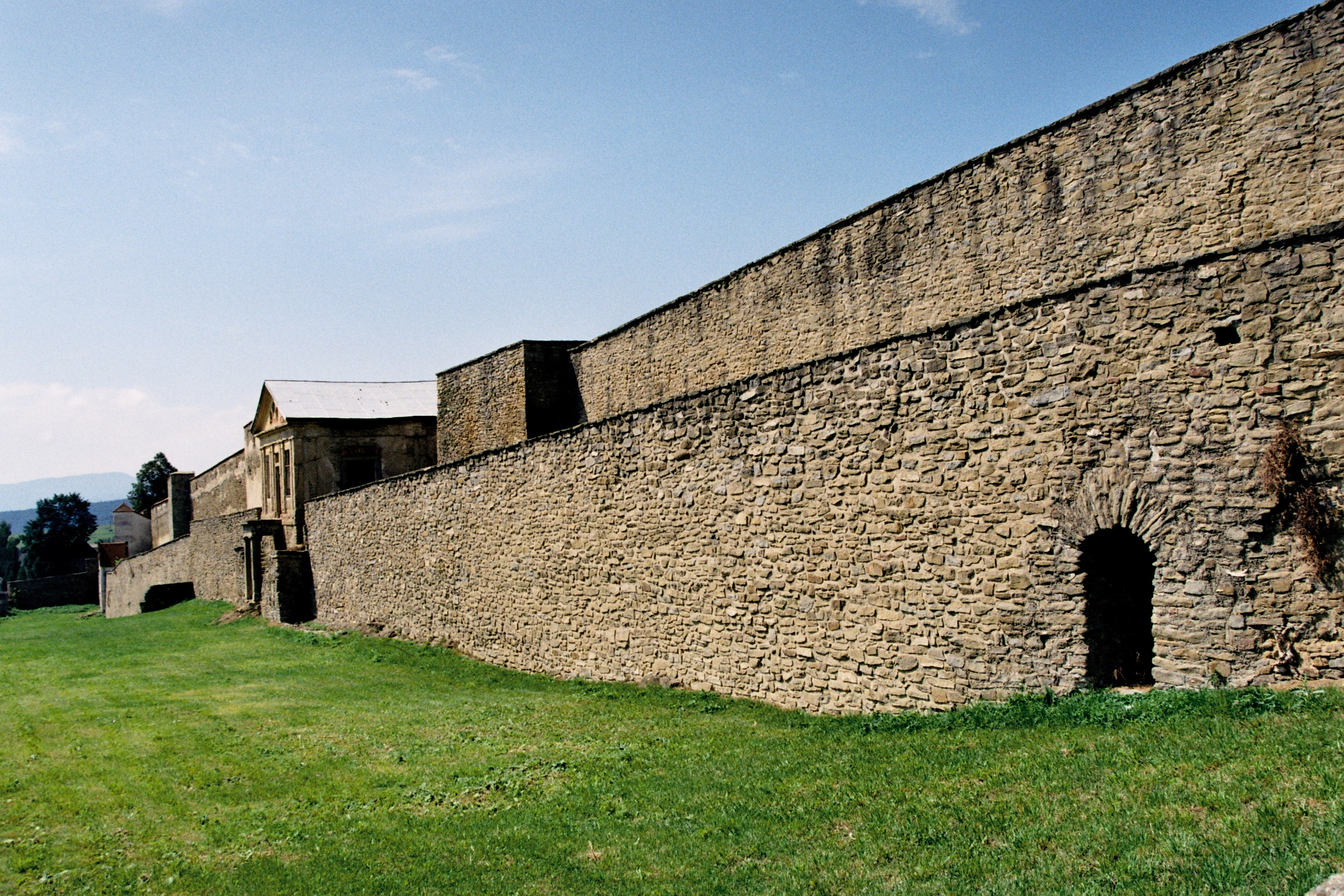
Levoča city walls

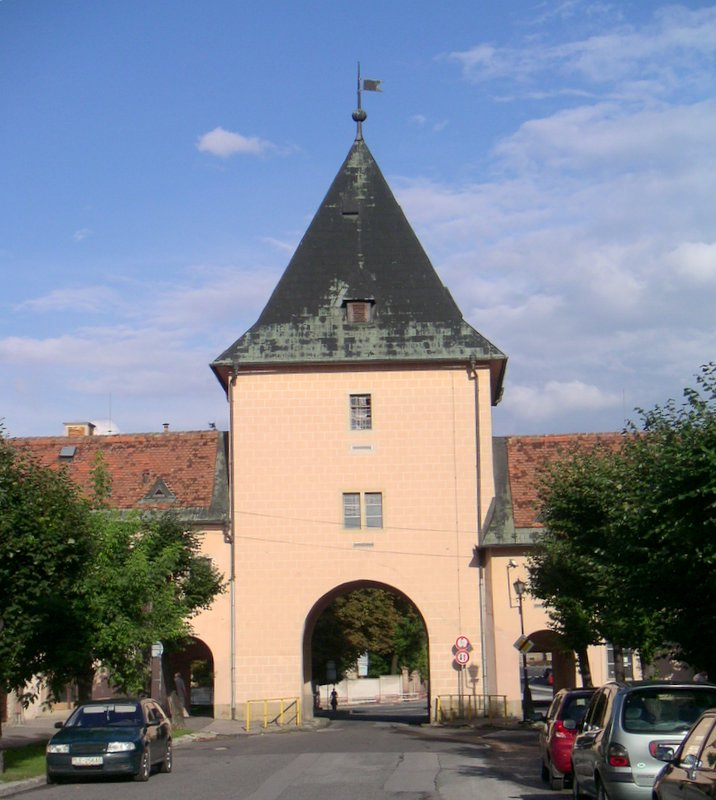
Košice Gate in Levoča

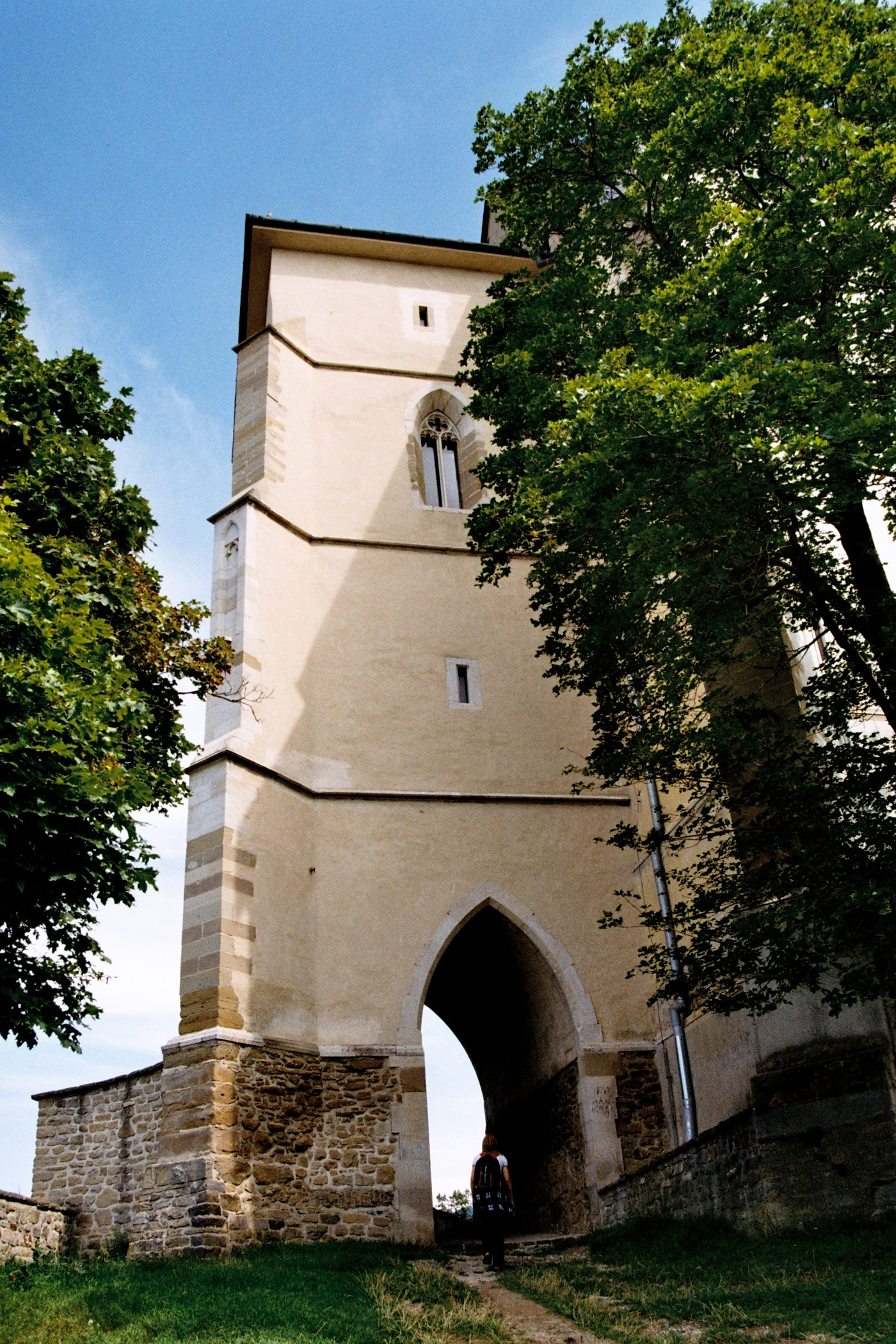
Polish Gate in Levoča

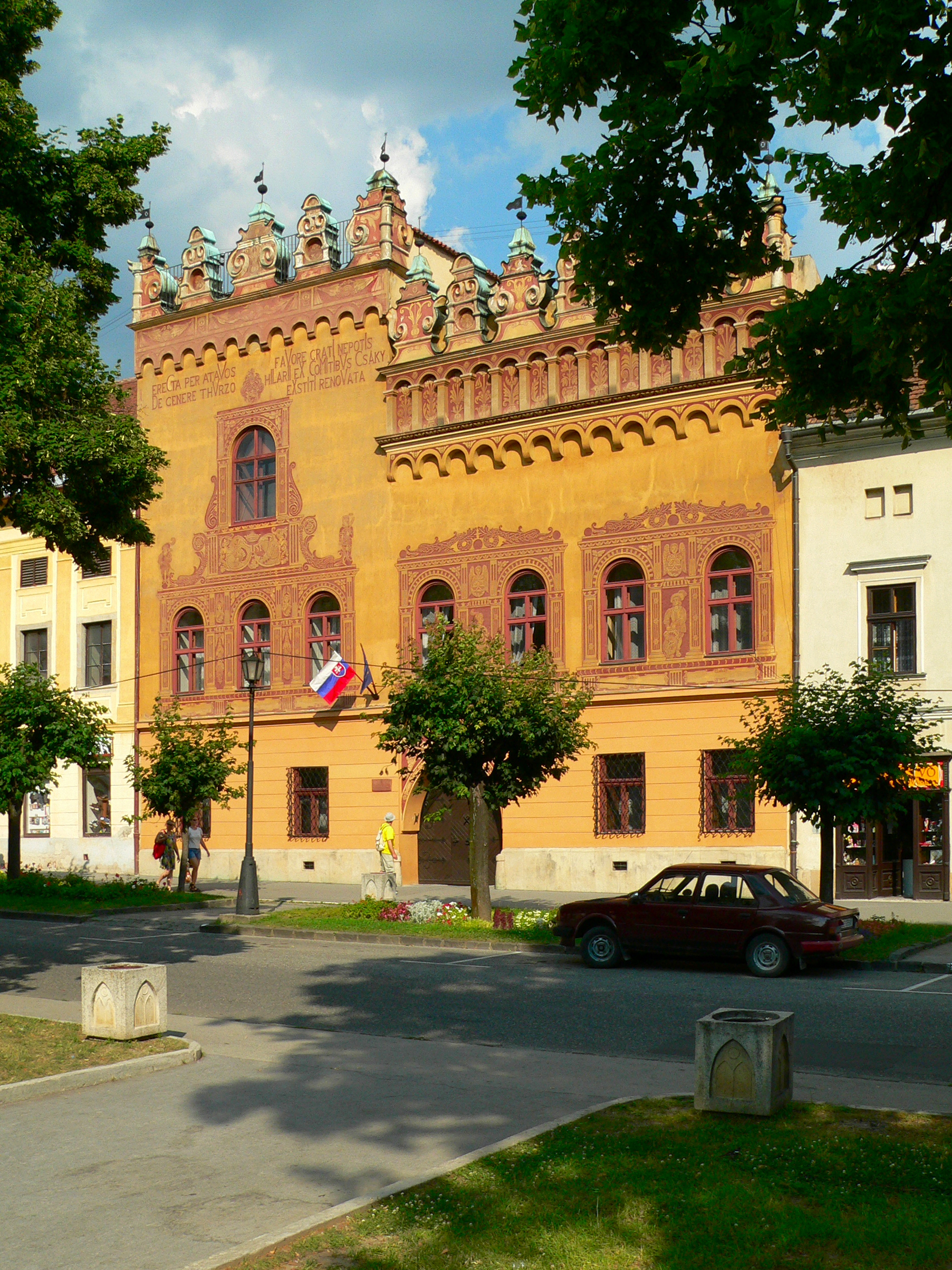
Thurzo House in Levoča

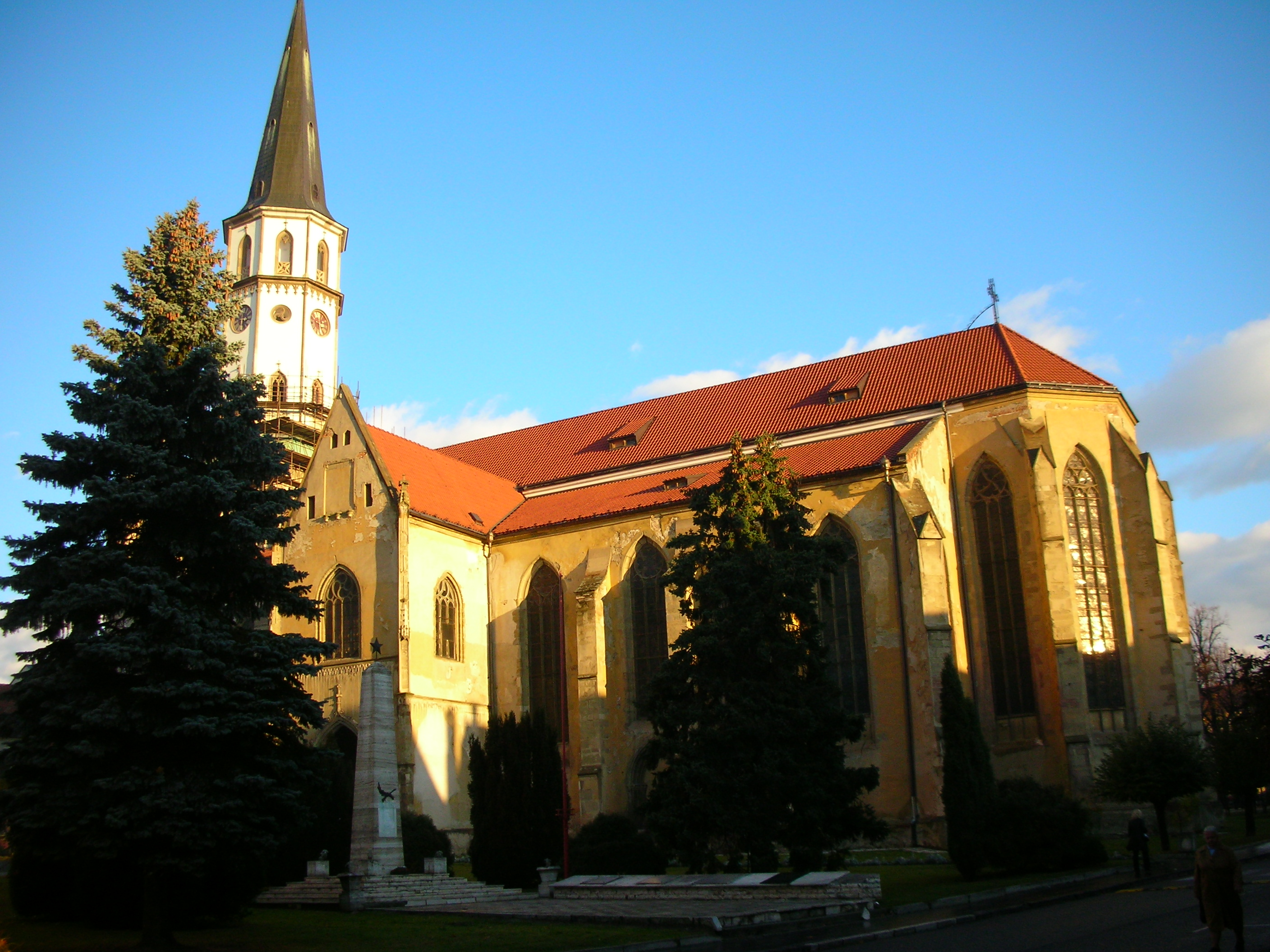
Basilica of St. James in Levoča

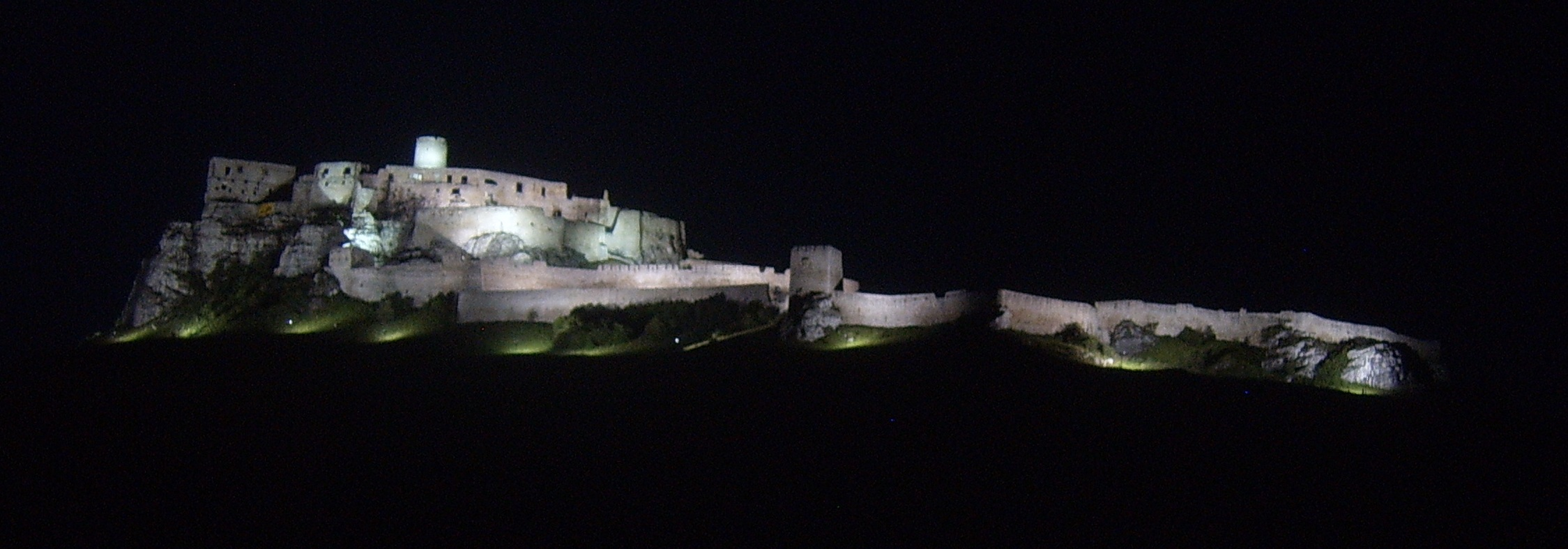
Spiš Castle at night

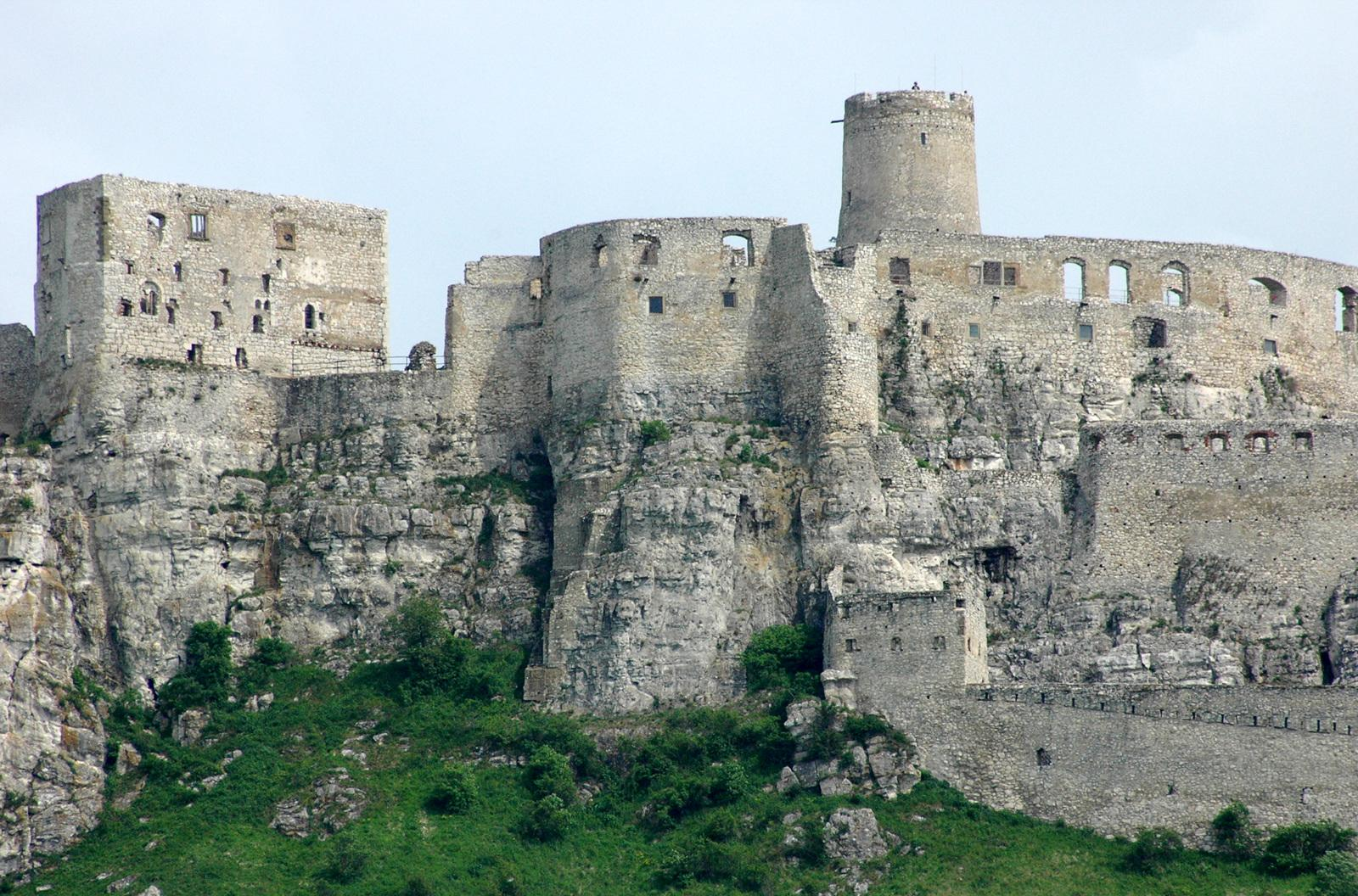
Spiš Castle

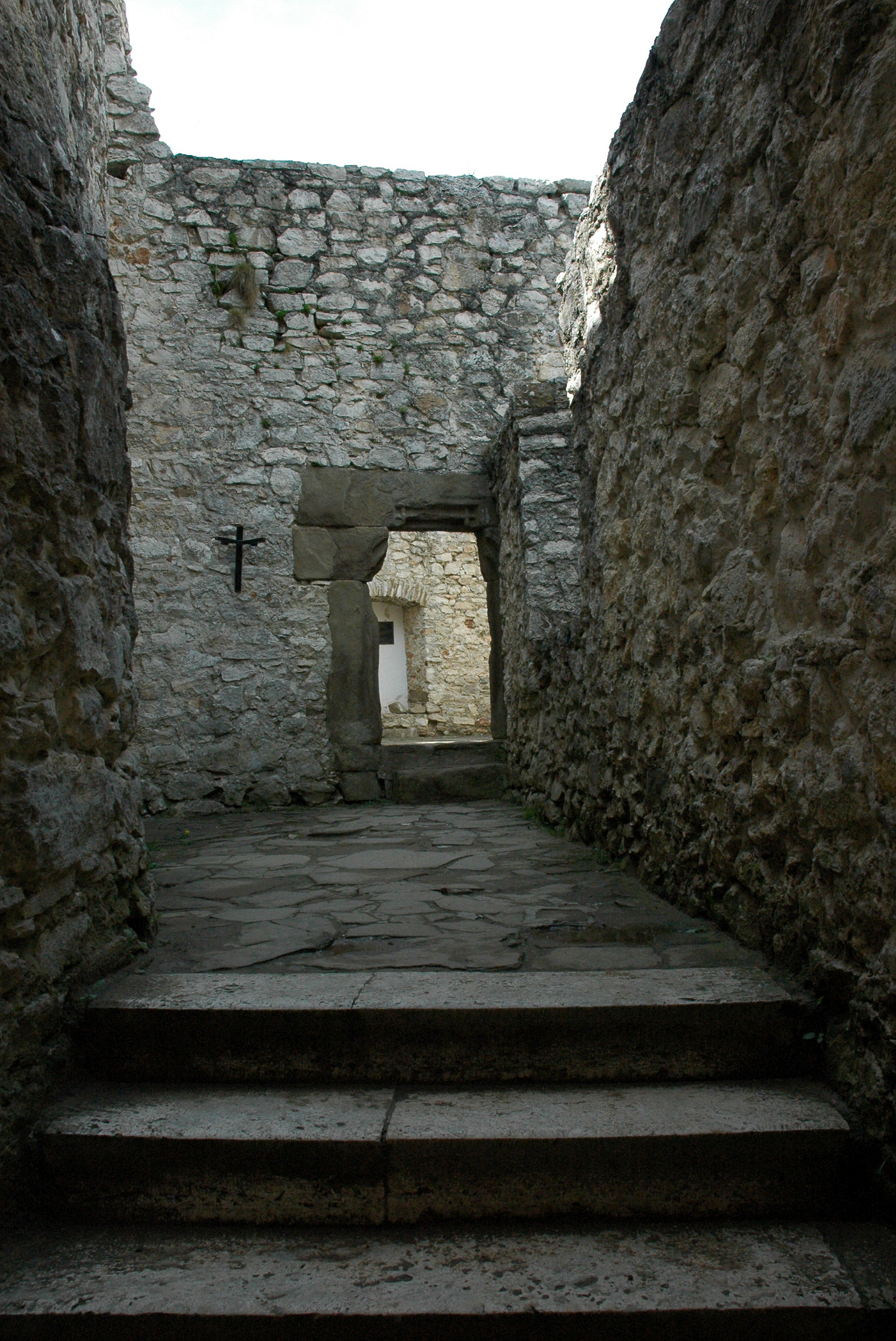
Inside the Spiš Castle

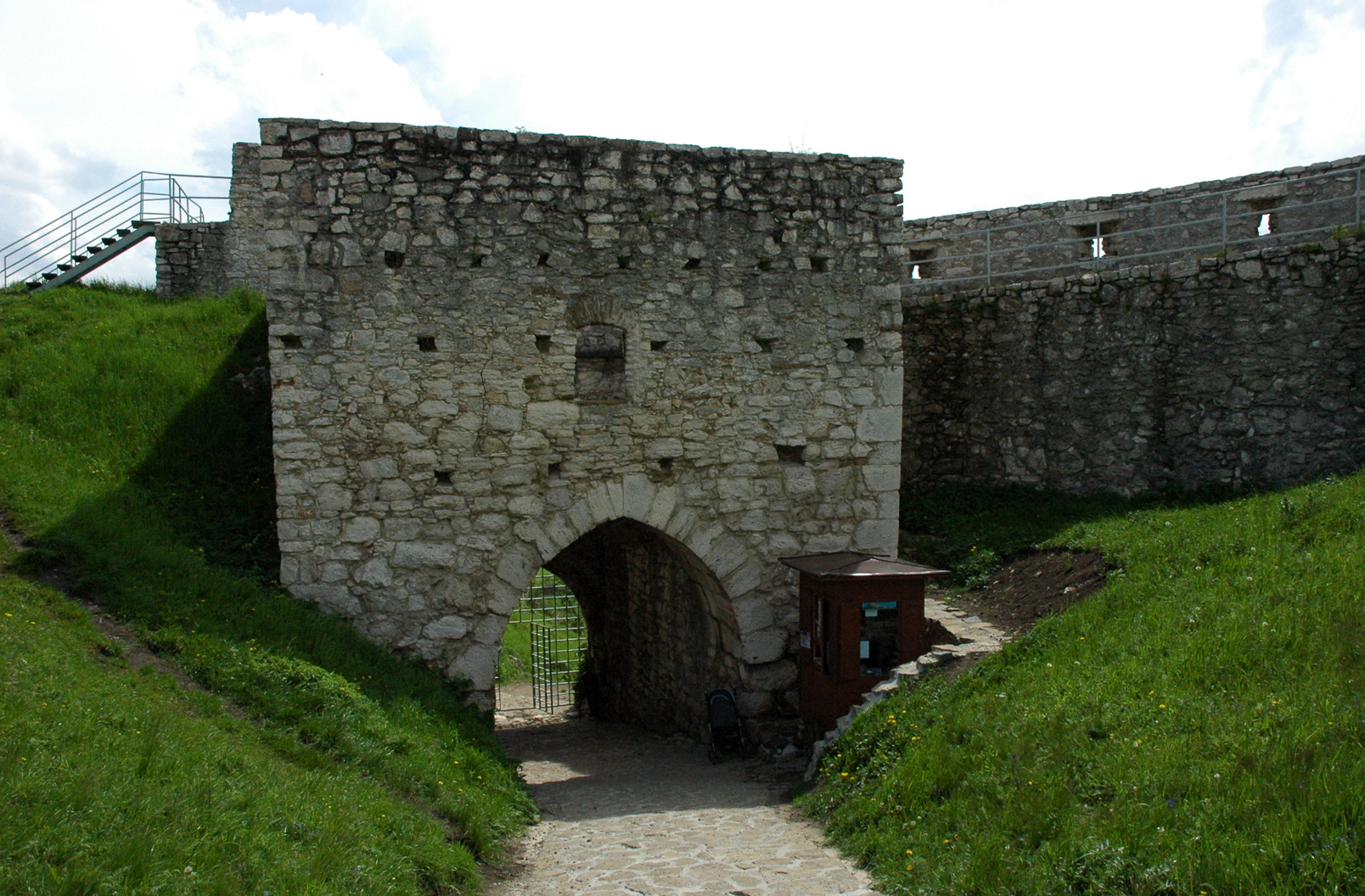
Spiš Castle

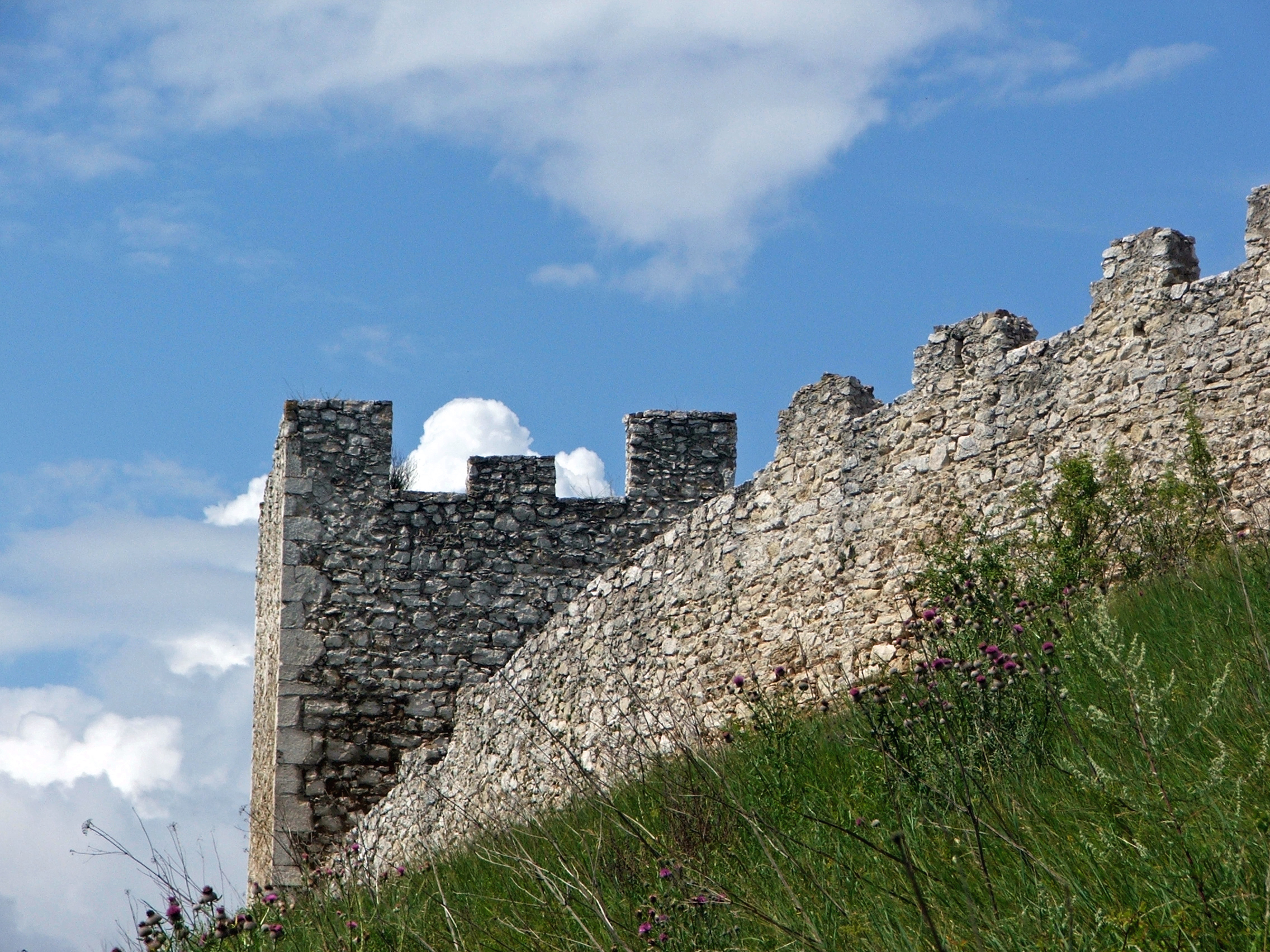
Spiš Castle walls

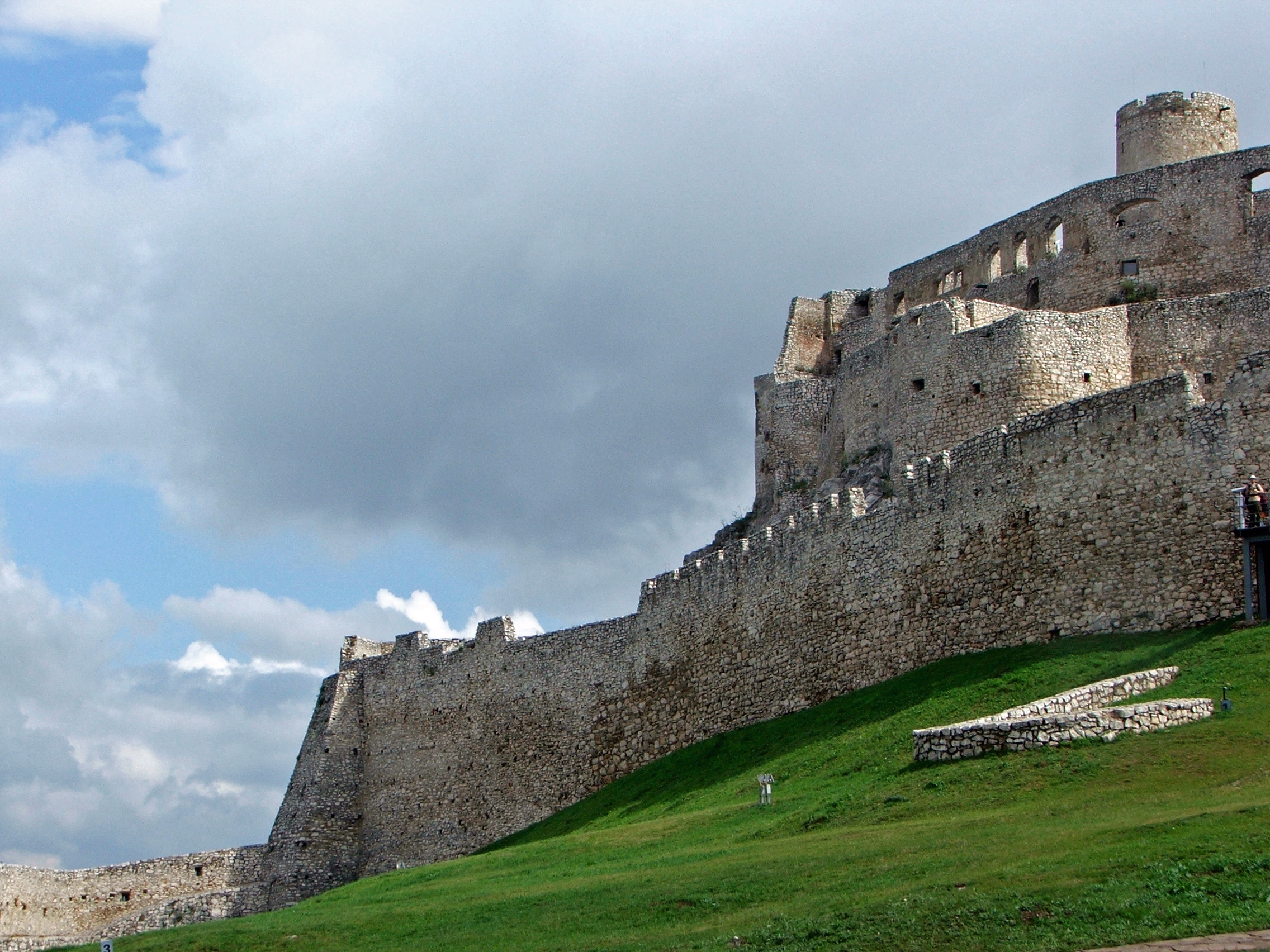
Spiš Castle

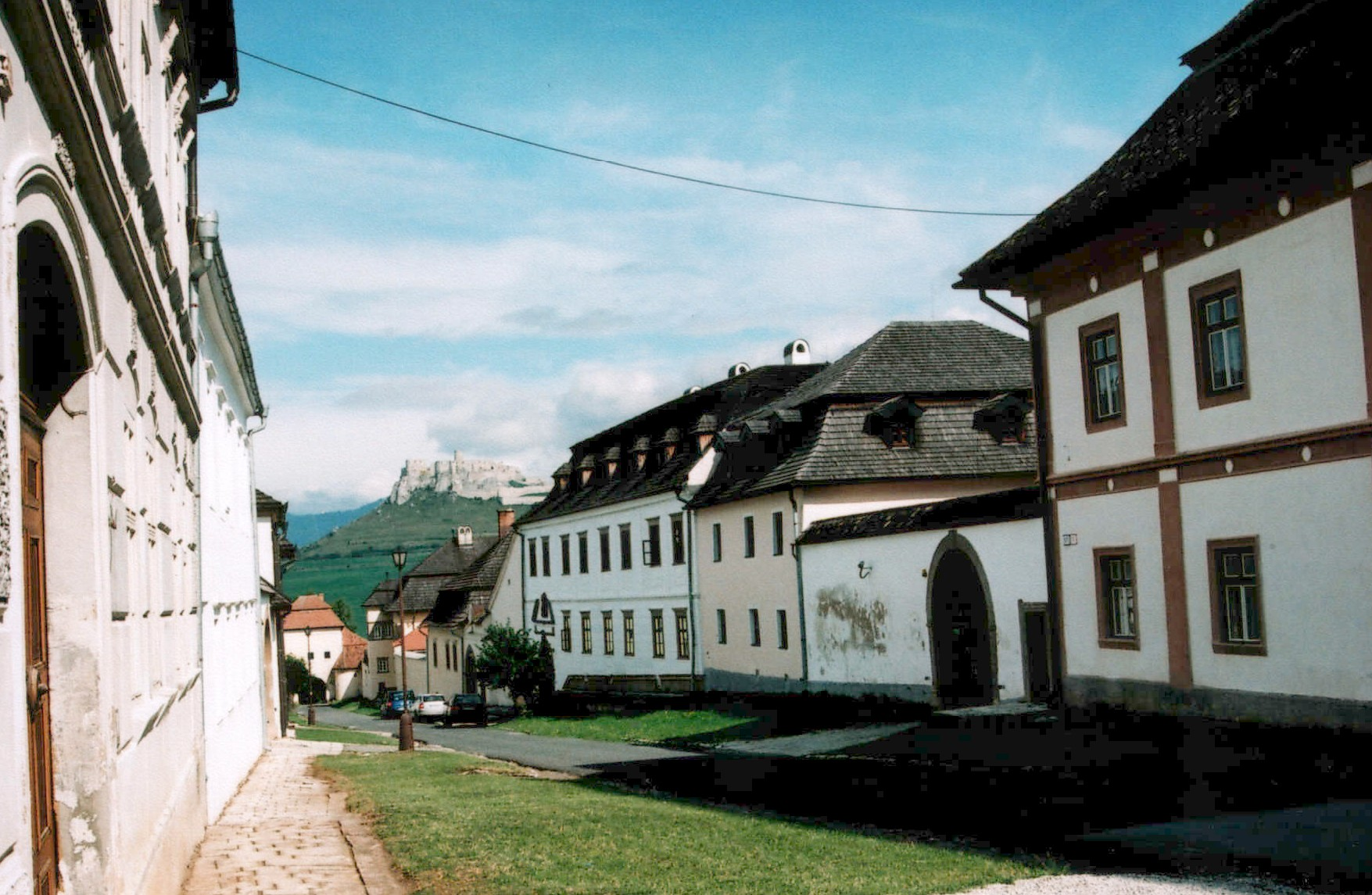
Street in Spišská Kapitula

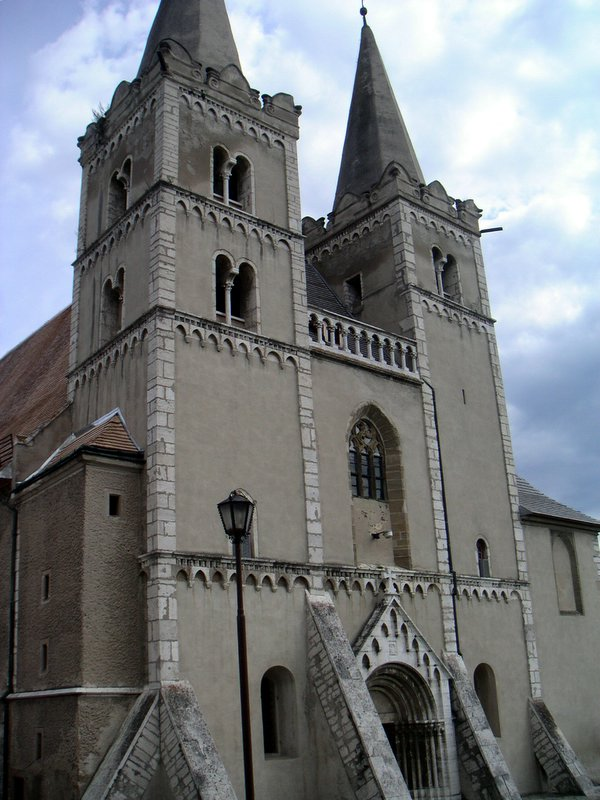
Cathedral of St. Martin

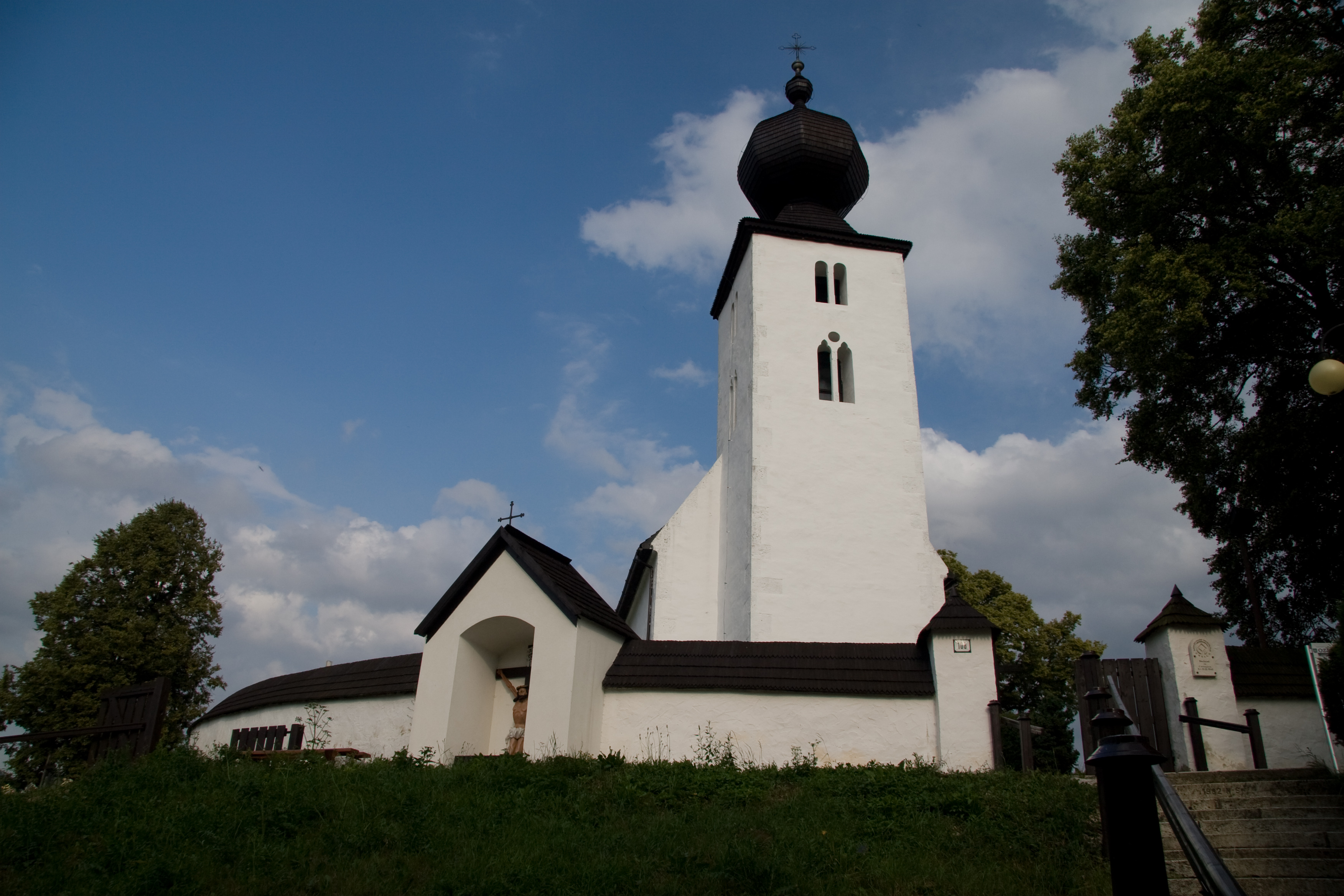
Church of Holy Spirit in Žehra

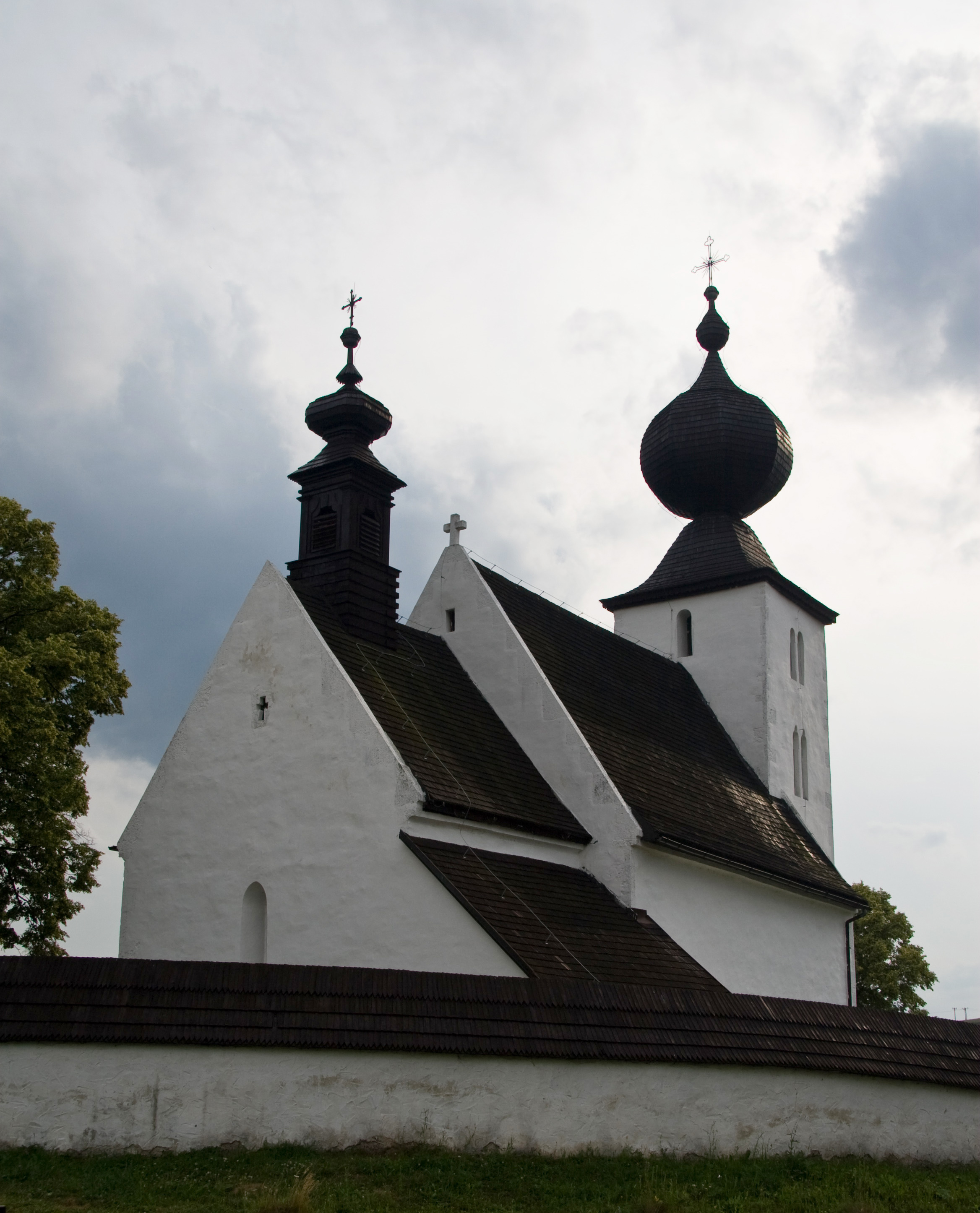
Church of Holy Spirit in Žehra

== Resources ==
- "Levoča, Spiš Castle and associated cultural monuments". UNESCO World Heritage Centre.
- "Spišská Kapitula". Slovenský Raj.
