= Basilica of St. James, Levoča =

Basilica of St. James Bazilika svätého Jakuba
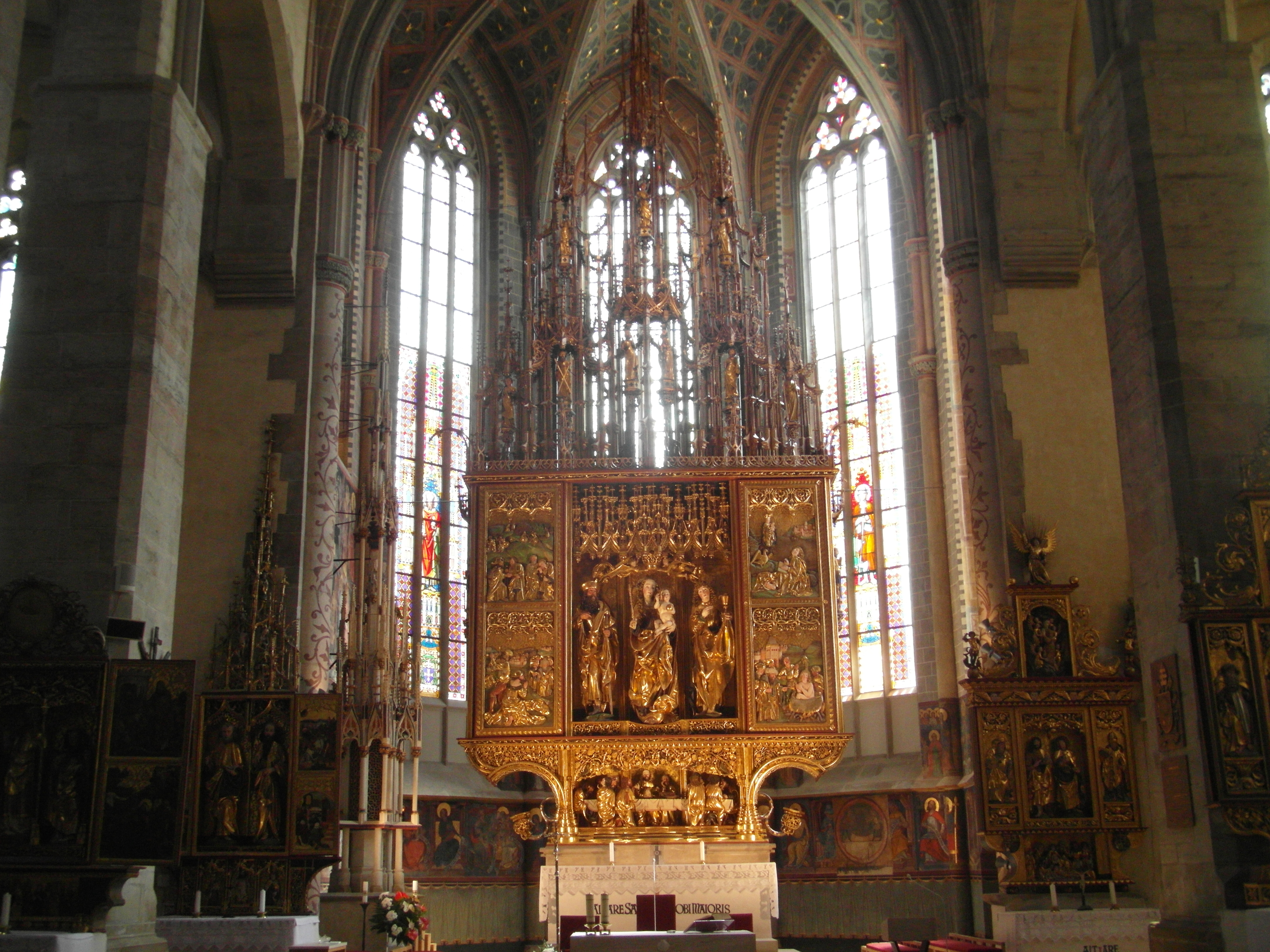
- Main altar, created by the workshop of Master Paul of Levoča, 1517
- Basilica of St. James; Bazilika svätého Jakuba
- 49°1′35″N 20°35′21″E
- Location: Levoča
- Country: Slovakia
- Denomination: Catholic
- Website: rkc.levoca.sk/k_jakub.html

History
- Status: Basilica minor
- Dedication: James the Apostle

Architecture
- Style: Gothic
- Years built: 14th century

Administration
- Diocese: Spiš

UNESCO World Heritage Site
- Part of: "Levoča and the work of Master Paul in Spiš " part of Levoča, Spišský Hrad and the Associated Cultural Monuments
- Criteria: Cultural: (iv)
- Reference: 620bis-002
- Inscription: 1993 (17th Session)
- Extensions: 2009

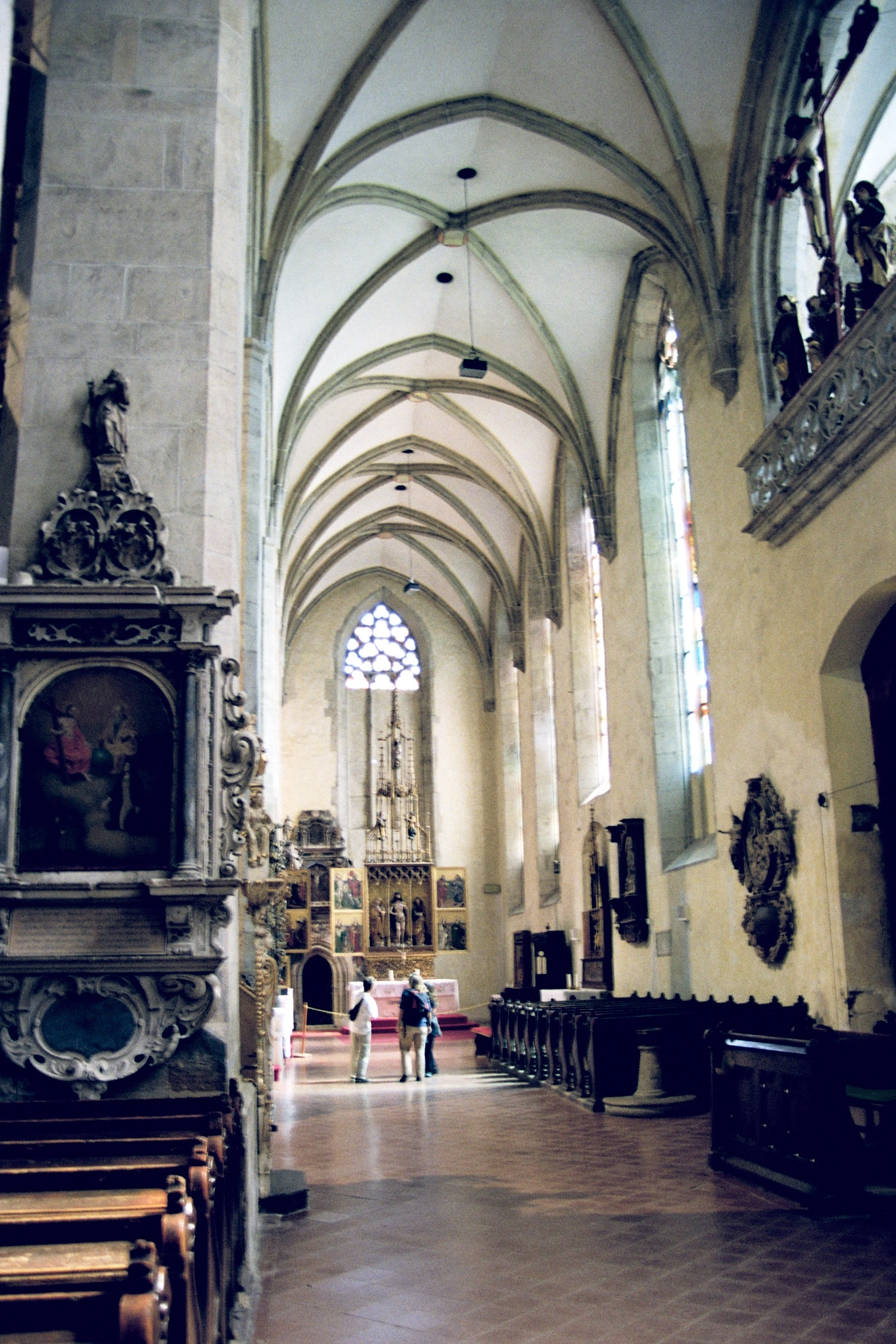
Side nave

The Basilica of St. James (Slovak: Bazilika svätého Jakuba) is a Gothic church in Levoča, Prešovský kraj, Slovakia. Building began in the 14th century. It is a Catholic parish church, dedicated to James the Apostle.

The interior features several Gothic altars, including as the main altar the world's tallest wooden altar at 18.62 metres (61.1 ft) by the workshop of Master Paul of Levoča, completed in 1517. The church, the second largest in Slovakia, also houses well-preserved furniture and art work. The steeple dates from the 19th century. The church was added to the UNESCO World Heritage Site Levoča, Spiš Castle and the associated cultural monuments in 2009. It is also a Slovak National Monument. In 2015, Pope Francis declared the church a basilica minor.

== History ==
Building of the Gothic church began in the centre of Levoča, then in the Kingdom of Hungary, in the 14th century. The church dominates the main square of the historic town, together with a Renaissance town hall. It is a Catholic church, dedicated to James the Apostle.

The interior features several Gothic altars, including as the main altar the world's tallest wooden altar at 18.62 metres (61.1 ft). It was created by the workshop of Master Paul of Levoča and completed in 1517. The church, the second largest in Slovakia, also houses precious furniture and art work, such as works of the jeweler János Szillassy. During the Reformation, the church was Protestant from 1544. An organ was built from 1622.

The church tower was also used as a watchtower by the town, to give the alert to any incipient fires. The medieval tower was itself damaged by lightning in the early nineteenth century, and was replaced by a neo-Gothic tower (probably the first in this style in what is now Slovakia) designed by Fridrich Muck and constructed in 1852–1870, which is 70 meters high. Of the original tower bells, one was relocated in the bell tower of the Town Hall; the others were melted down during World War I and were replaced in 1925. Since 2016 the tower, which gives a view across the town's historical centre, has been opened to visitors.

Thanks to its treasures, the church was added to the UNESCO World Heritage Site Levoča, Spiš Castle and the associated cultural monuments in 2009. It is also a Slovak National Monument. On 30 November 2015, Pope Francis declared the church a basilica minor.

== Altars ==
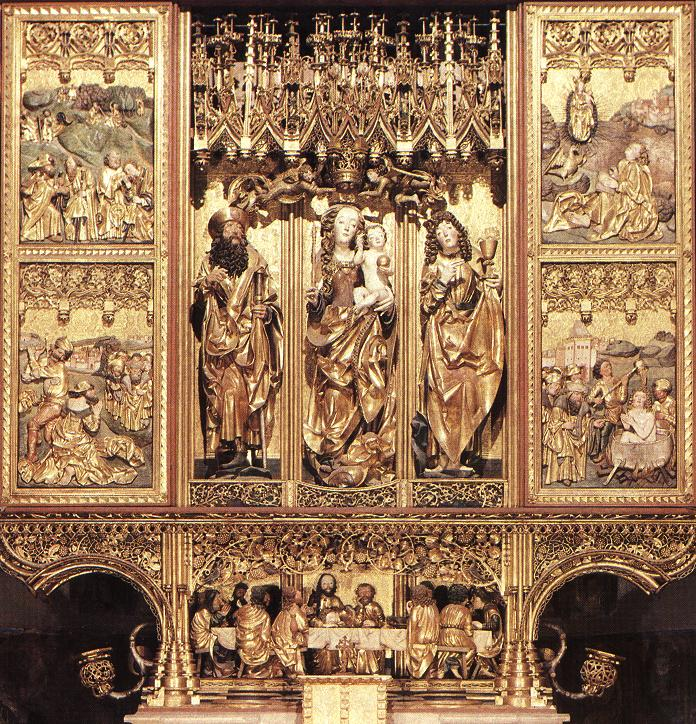
Centre of the main altar

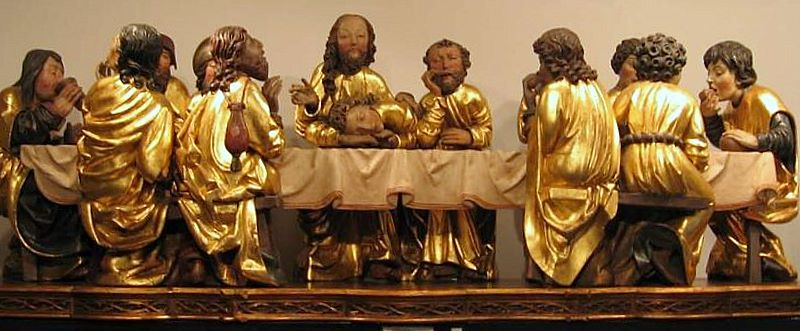
The Last Supper, scene on the main altar

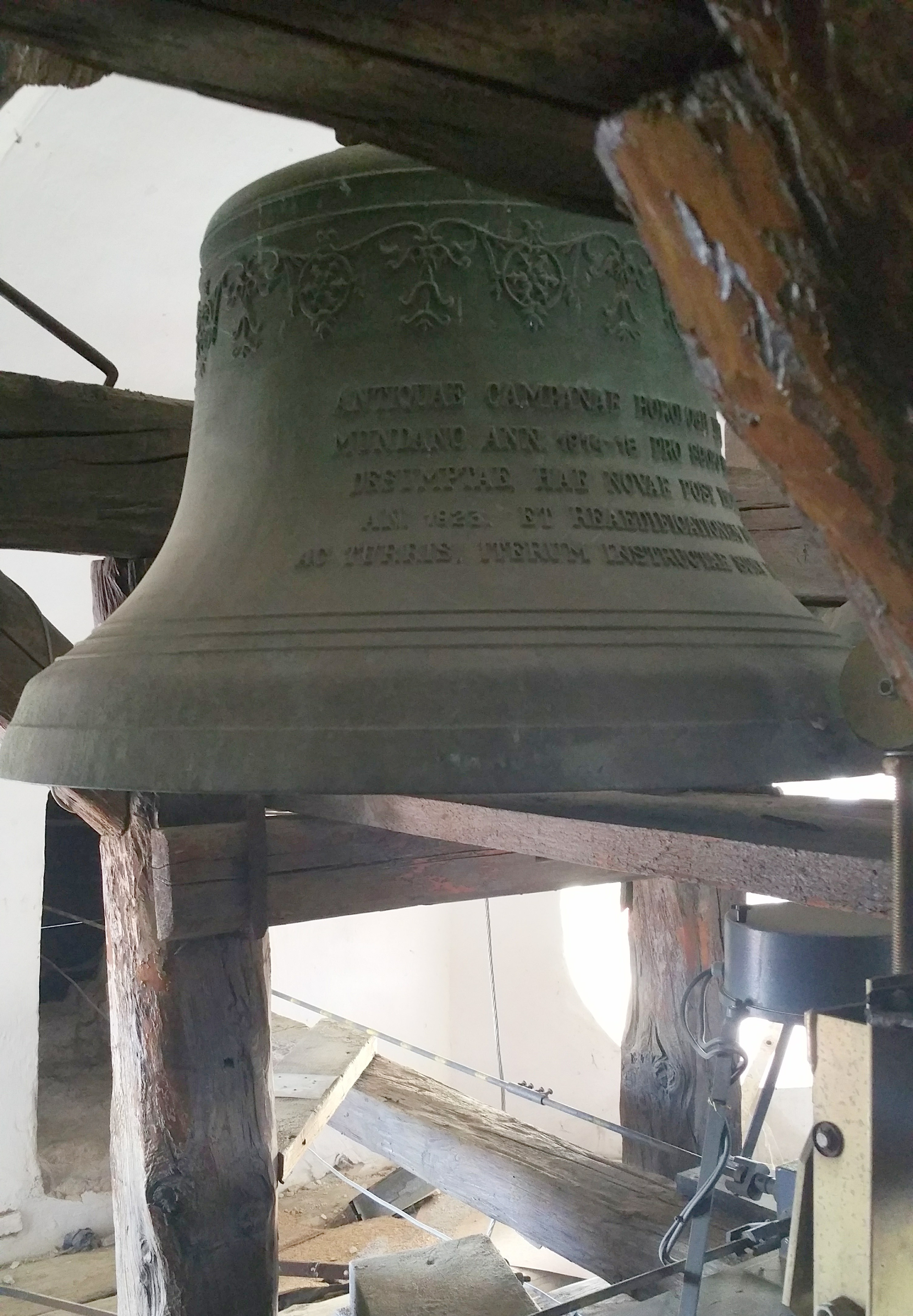
Bell in the tower of the basilica

The church has 18 altars. The principal altars are as follows:

- High Altar (Altar of St. James the Apostle). Created by Master Paul 1507–1517. The altar was constructed in stages. The retable was completed in 1508. Additional sculpture and painting may have been completed by 1515. The last phases, including gilding, were carried out by 1517.

Many of the paintings of the Passion on the altar's polyptych are based on the engravings by Lucas Cranach of the Passion cycle, published in 1509. The statues of the Twelve Apostles on the altar's ciborium date from about 1390, and may have been part of an earlier altar in the church.

- Sculptures of the Altar of the Nativity (Master Paul) – now included in the baroque Czaky altar. The sculptures were hidden for 200 years in the Town Hall during the period of religious disturbances.
- Altar of the Four Saint Johns (1520, Master Paul).
- Altar of St. Anne (Altar of Metercia), (1516, Master Paul).
- Altar of Saints Peter and Paul (1495, pre-dates Master Paul).
- Altar of Bishop St. Nicholas (1507). The figures of St. Leonard and St. John are by Master Paul, but the figure of St. Nicholas dates from 1360 to 1370.
- Altar of St. Catherine of Alexandria (c. 1460)
- Altar of St. Michael Archangel (c. 1620).
- Altar of The Good Shepherd (c. 1700).
- Altar of Virgin Mary of the Snows (Altar of the Thirteen Towns).
- Altar Vir dolorum, (Altar of King Matthias Corvinus) (1476–1490).
- Altar of St. Elisabeth the Widow, a panel painting of 1492.

The church also has a statue of St. George and the Dragon from the workshop of Master Paul.

== Frescos ==
The church has numerous frescoes. Among these are:

- a cycle of frescoes, "Seven Virtues and Seven Vices", dating from c. 1385.
- twenty scenes from the legend of St. Dorothy, (c. 1400)
- a wall painting of the Last Judgement (c. 1500).

== Painted epitaphs ==
An unusual feature of the church is a number of painted epitaphs on the church walls. These include the epitaph of Margita Urbanovič, Master Paul's niece, which is the only specific contemporary record that Paul was the creator of the high altar.

== Organ ==
Replacing earlier instruments, the present organ was built by Hans Hummel, a German-born organ builder, commencing in 1622. During the construction, Hummel fell to his death from the scaffolding in 1630, and the organ was completed by the Polish organ builder Juraj Nitrovský.

At the time it was the largest organ in the Kingdom of Hungary. It was originally located in the northern nave of the church, before being moved to its present position in the organ chancel in the 19th century.
