= Master Paul of Levoča =

Slovakian medieval carver and sculptor

Master Paul of Levoča (Hungarian: Lőcsei Pál mester; German: Paul von Leutschau; Slovak: Majster Pavol z Levoče) was a medieval carver and sculptor of the 15th and 16th century, active mostly in then Carpathian-German town of Lőcse in Kingdom of Hungary (now Levoča, Slovakia).

== History ==
Most documents about him seem to have perished in the Lőcse fire of 1550. Thus neither his surname, nor dates or places of birth and death, are known. It is assumed that he was born between 1470 and 1480. He must have died between 1537 (when he is still mentioned on record) and 1542 (when his widow is mentioned).

His origin is unknown. Theories of his origin include being a native of Lőcse, theories of German origin link him to Passau, Wittenberg and Augsburg. He was also linked with origins from northern Italy or Tyrol. He probably started working in Kraków, judged by the connections of this city with Lőcse at that time and, based on the artistic similarities, he may have been a student of Veit Stoss. He worked in Sabinov and Banská Bystrica before settling in Lőcse in 1500, marrying a daughter of an influential citizen. In 1506 he established a carving workshop. A list of some of his works includes an Altar of St. Barbara in Besztercebánya (now Banská Bystrica, Slovakia) dated to 1509, an Altar of St. George in Szepesszombat (now Spišská Sobota, Slovakia) of 1516, and his most famous work, completed in 1517, an altar in the Basilica of St. James in Lőcse. This late Gothic altar is the tallest in Europe, measured at 18.62 meters. It is carved in wood and decorated with gold. It is the only work that is attributed to him by documentation, rather than stylistic analysis. The Madonna from this altar was depicted in the former issue of 100 SKK banknotes (before Slovakia's adoption of the Euro in 2009).

In 1527 he became a member of the Lőcse town council, but he gained most of his fame and recognition after his death. He began to be recognised by art historians in 1870s in debates concerning the Lőcse altar.

== Gallery ==
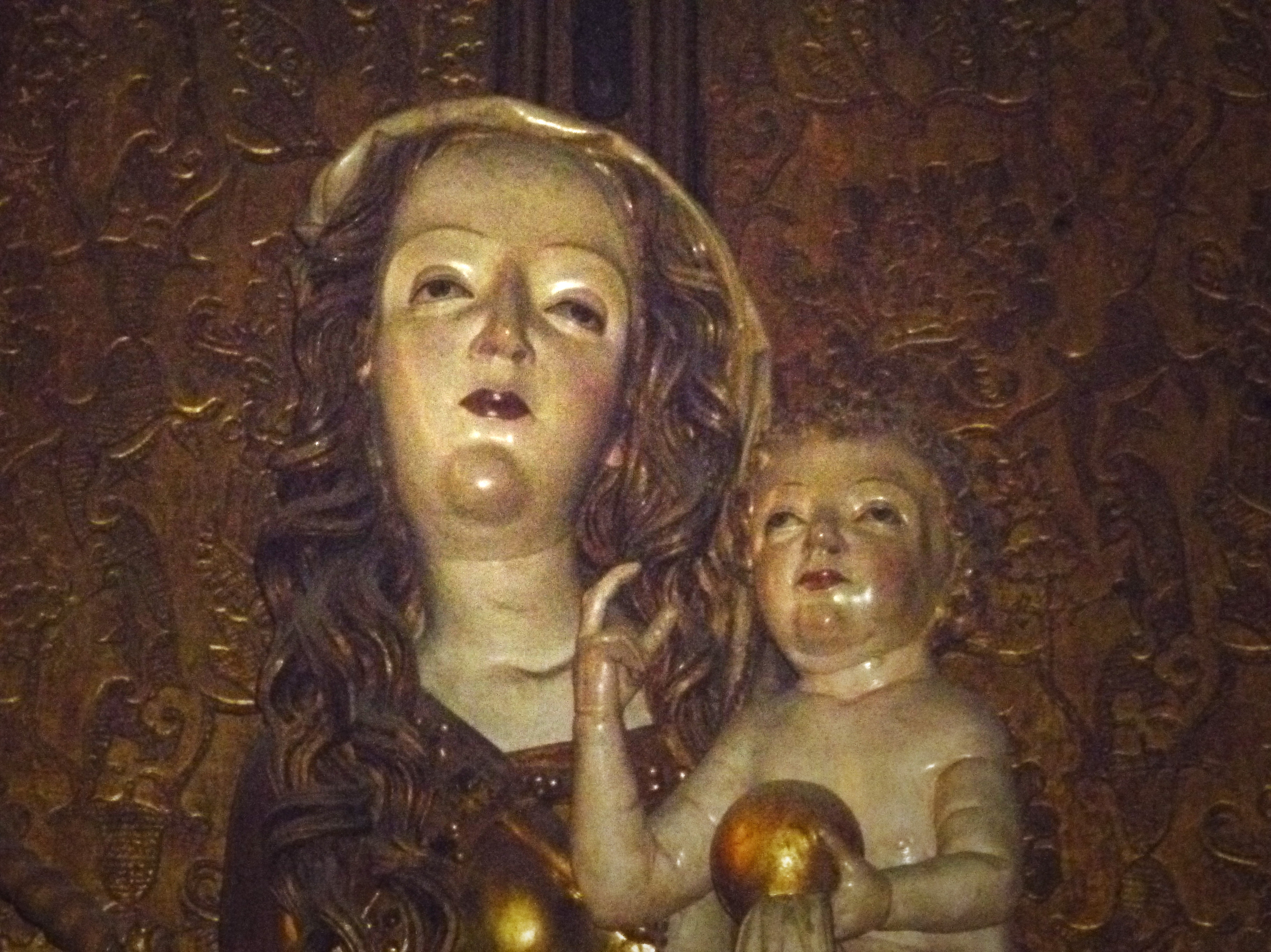
Madonna and Child, detail of the retable in the Church of the Assumption, Banská Bystrica

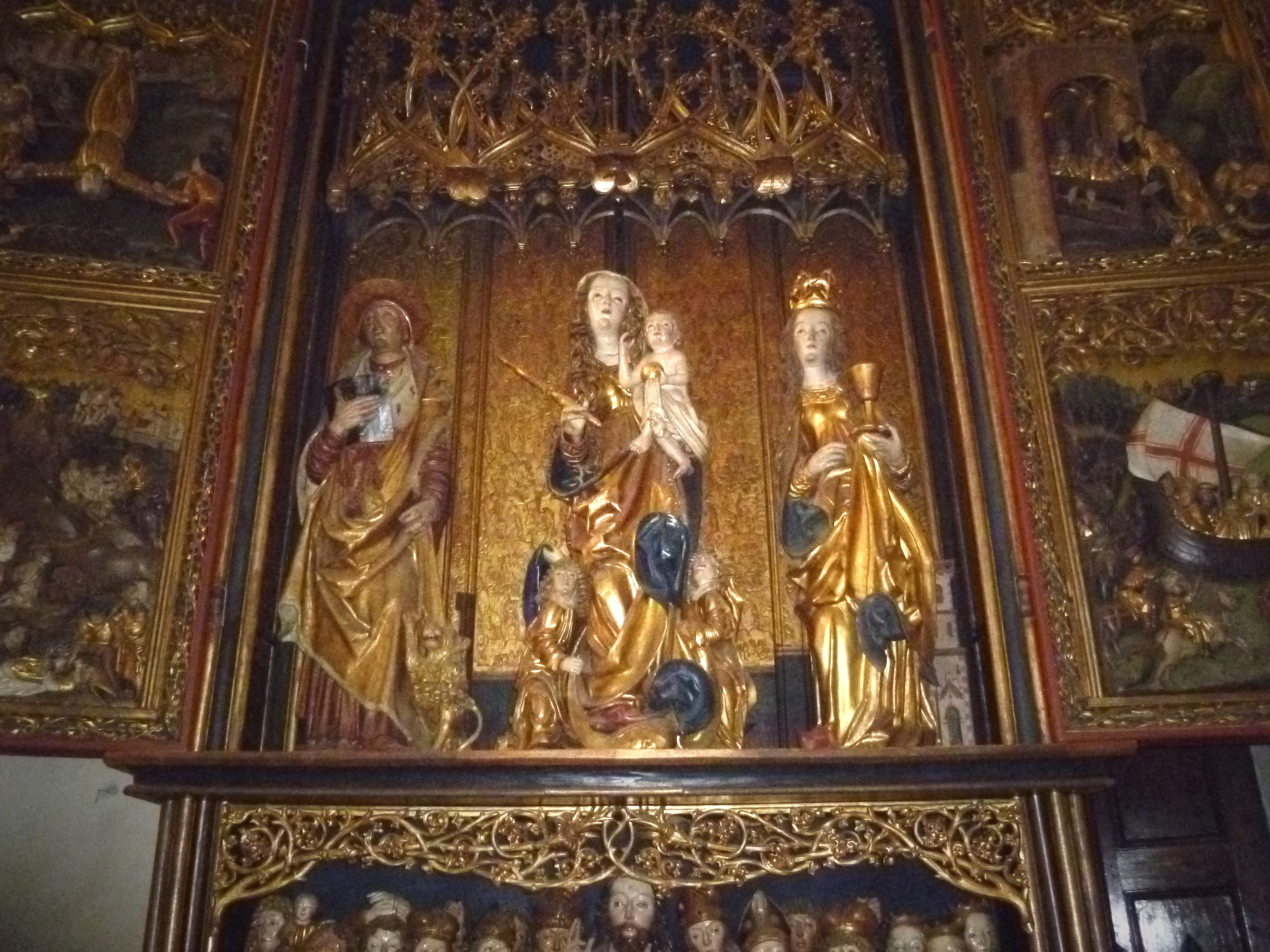
Altar of Saint. Barbara, retable by Master Paul of Levoča in the Church of the Assumption in Banská Bystrica

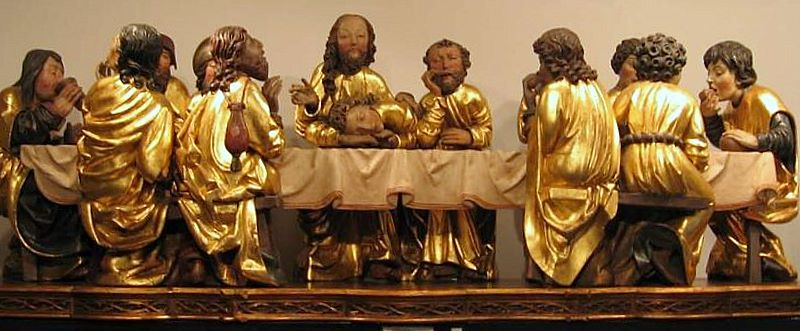
The Last Supper scene from Master Paul's altar in Levoča Lutheran church (1799–1808)

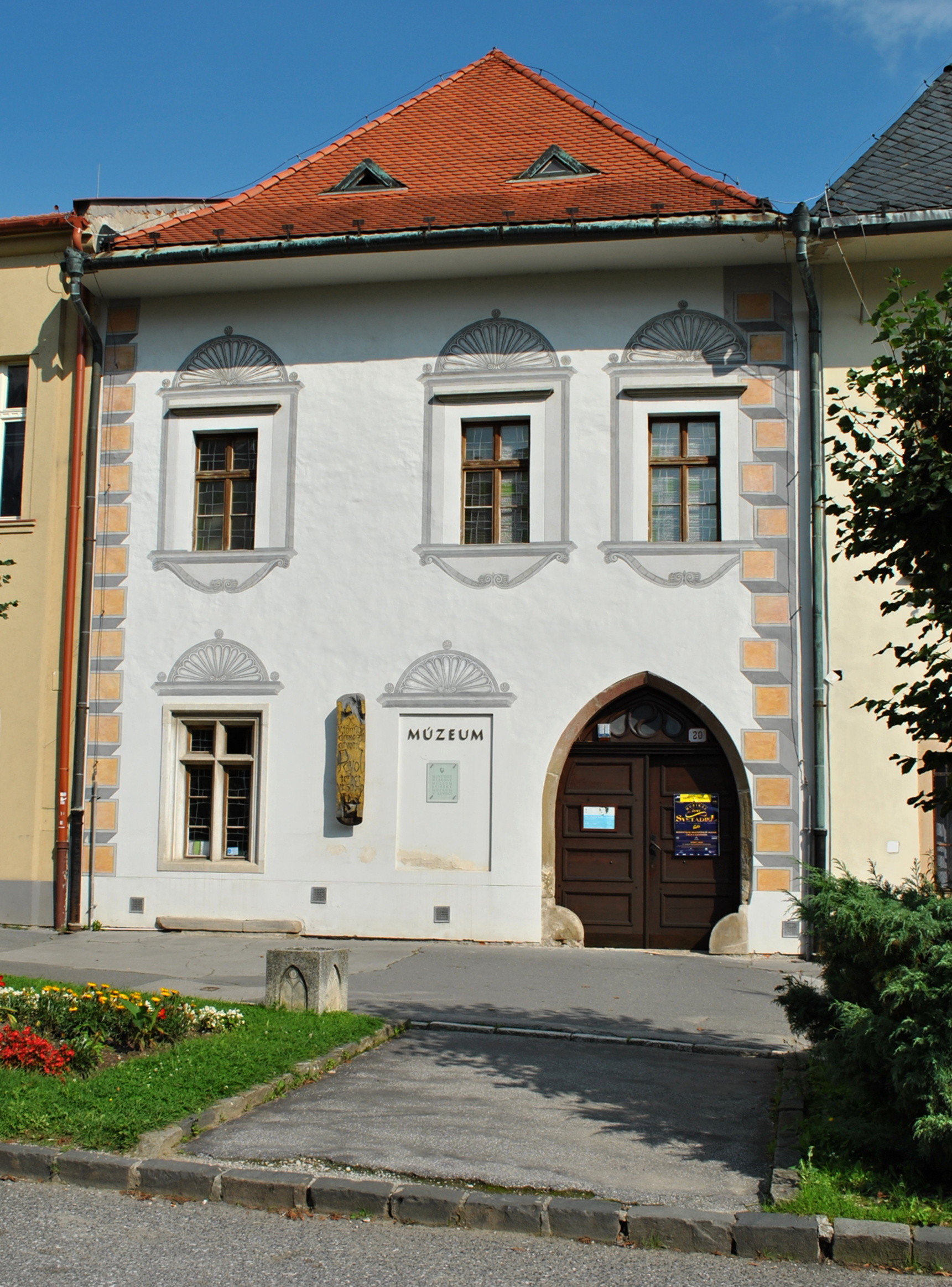
House No. 20 in Levoča, where Master Paul's workshop was located, now a museum

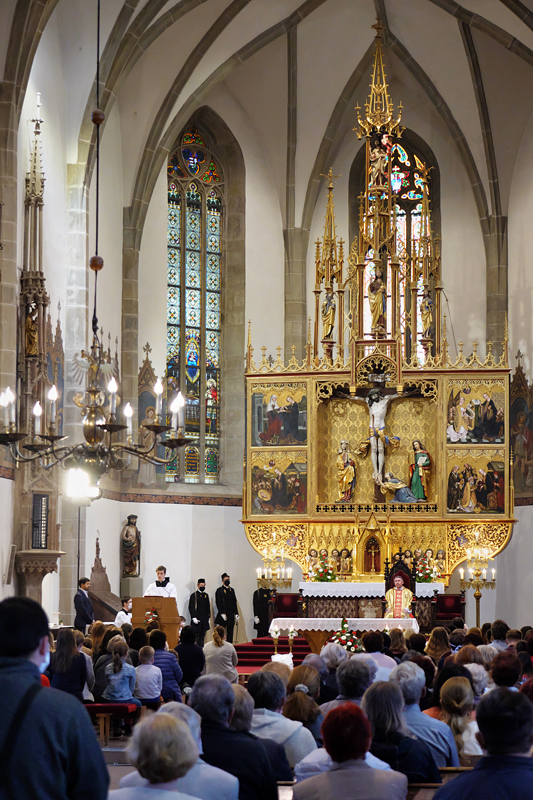
The interior of the Basilica of the Holy Cross in Kežmarok and the main altar with a sculpture of the crucified Jesus
