= Levoča =

Town in Slovakia

- Municipality
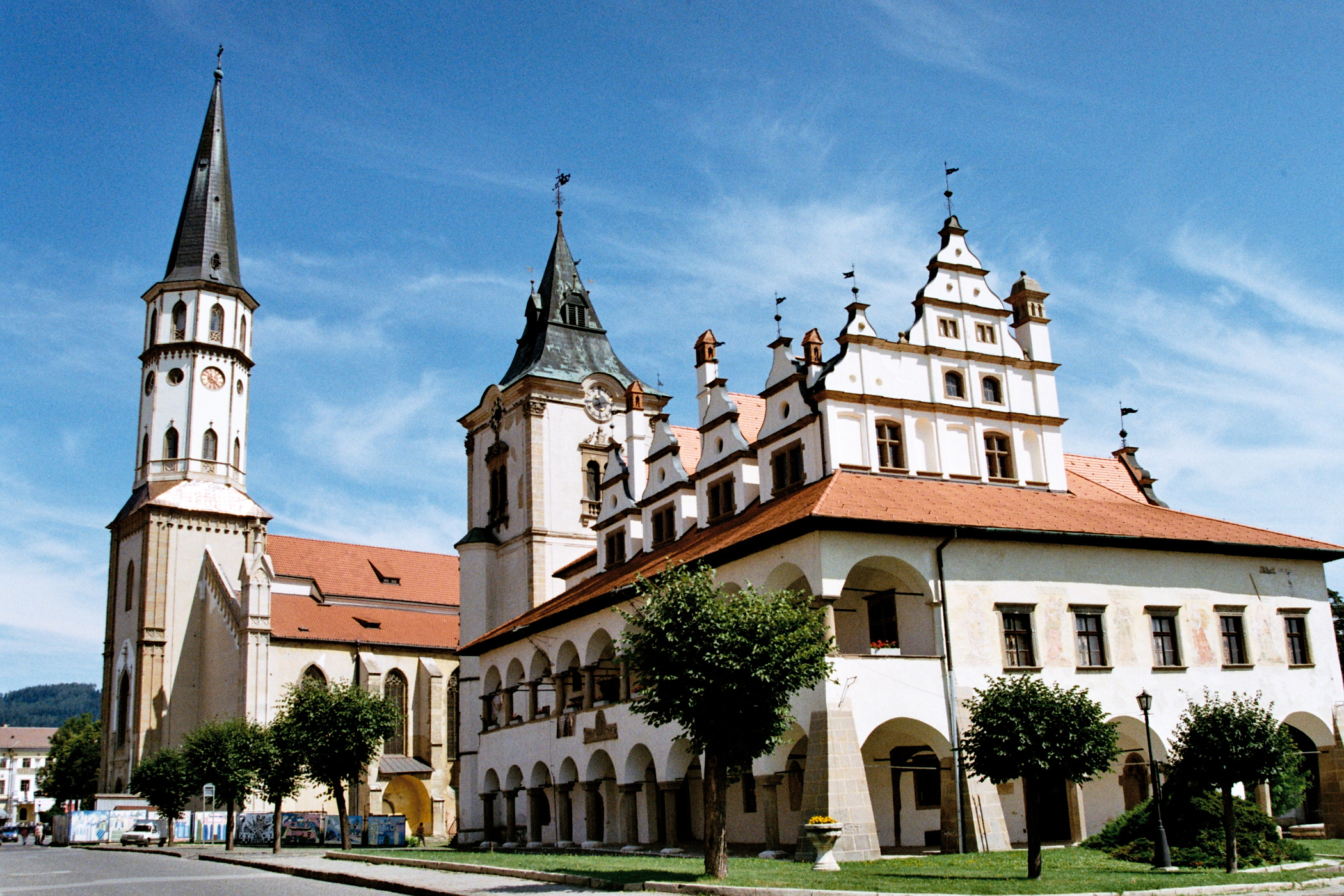
- Basilica of St. James and Old Town Hall

- Flag Coat of arms

- Location of Levoča in the Prešov Region Location of Levoča in Slovakia
- Coordinates: 49.03°N 20.59°E
- Country: Slovakia
- Region: Prešov Region
- District: Levoča District
- First mentioned: 1249

Government
  - Mayor: Miroslav Vilkovský (elected November 2018)

Area
  - Total: 64.04 km^{2} (24.73 sq mi)
- Elevation: 628 m (2,060 ft)

Population (2025)
  - Total: 13,779
- Time zone: UTC+1 (CET)
  - Summer (DST): UTC+2 (CEST)
- Postal code: 540 1
- Area code: +421 53
- Vehicle registration plate (until 2022): LE
- Website: www.levoca.sk

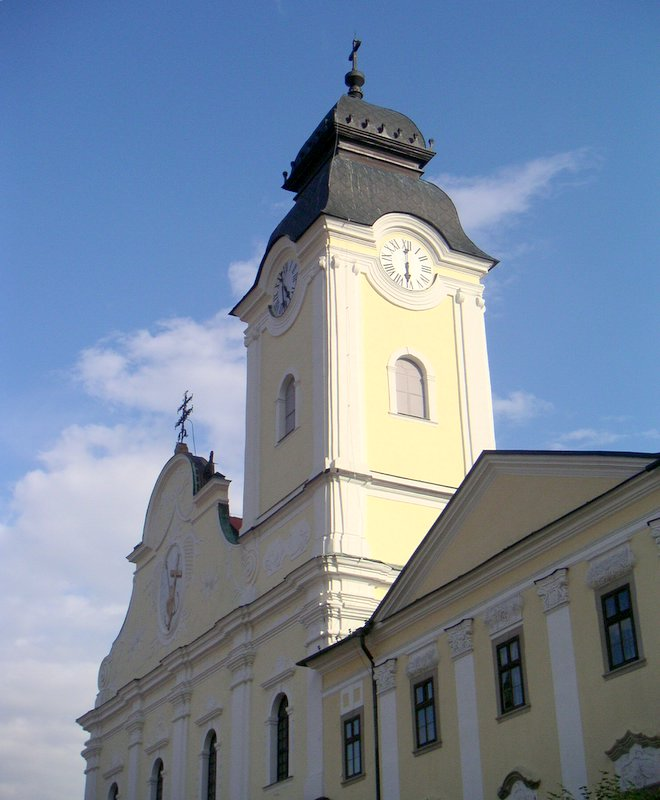
Tower of the Church of the Holy Spirit

Levoča (Hungarian: Lőcse; Rusyn: Левоча; German: Leutschau) is the principal town of Levoča District in the Prešov Region of eastern Slovakia, with a population of 14,256. The town has a historic center with a well-preserved town wall, a Gothic church with the tallest wooden altar in the world, carved by Master Pavol of Levoča, and many other Renaissance buildings.

On 28 June 2009, Levoča was added by UNESCO to its World Heritage List.

== Geography ==
The municipality lies at an altitude of 628 metres (2,060 ft) and covers an area of 64.04 km^{2} (24.73 sq mi) (2025).

It is located in the northern part of the Hornád Basin at the foothills of the Levoča Hills, at the stream Levočský potok, a tributary of Hornád. Poprad is 25 kilometres (16 miles) away to the west, Prešov 50 km (31 miles) to the east, Košice 90 km (56 miles) to the southeast and Bratislava 370 km (230 mi) to the southwest. Nearby settlements include:

- Levočská Dolina (=English: Levoča Valley). About 4 km (2 mi) out of town, on the way to Závada.
- Levočské Lúky (=English: Levoča Fields). Settlement on the road to Spišska Nová Ves.
- Závada. Village in the hills above Levočská Dolina.

== Population ==
Historical population
| Year | Pop. | ±% |
|---|---|---|
| 1970 | 9,502 | — |
| 1980 | 11,097 | +16.8% |
| 1991 | 12,678 | +14.2% |
| 2001 | 14,366 | +13.3% |
| 2011 | 14,830 | +3.2% |
| 2021 | 14,256 | −3.9% |
Source: Censuses

Population statistic (10 years)
| Year | 1995 | 2005 | 2015 | 2025 |
|---|---|---|---|---|
| Count | 13,648 | 14,677 | 14,811 | 13,779 |
| Difference | | +7.53% | +0.91% | −6.96% |

Population statistic
| Year | 2024 | 2025 |
|---|---|---|
| Count | 13,905 | 13,779 |
| Difference | | −0.90% |

It has a population of 13,779 people (31 December 2025).

=== Ethnicity ===
Census 2021 (1+ %)
| Ethnicity | Number | Fraction |
|---|---|---|
| Slovak | 13,575 | 95.22% |
| Romani | 1256 | 8.81% |
| Not found out | 481 | 3.37% |
| Rusyn | 253 | 1.77% |
| Total | 14,256 | |

In year 2021 was 14,256 people by ethnicity 13,575 as Slovak, 1256 as Romani, 481 as Not found out, 253 as Rusyn, 68 as Czech, 25 as Other, 23 as Hungarian, 14 as German, 13 as Russian, 11 as Ukrainian, 9 as Polish, 8 as Canadian, 5 as Chinese, 5 as Austrian, 5 as Greek, 4 as Jewish, 4 as Irish, 4 as French, 3 as Turkish, 2 as Serbian, 2 as Romanian, 2 as Bulgarian, 2 as English, 2 as Albanian, 1 as Vietnamese, 1 as Italian, 1 as Silesian and 1 as Moravian.

Note on population: The difference values of population numbers in the table "Population statistic" and in the sections "Ethnicity" & "Religion" is caused by the use of various statistical methods.

=== Religion ===
Census 2021 (1+ %)
| Religion | Number | Fraction |
|---|---|---|
| Roman Catholic Church | 9670 | 67.83% |
| None | 2293 | 16.08% |
| Not found out | 830 | 5.82% |
| Greek Catholic Church | 609 | 4.27% |
| Christian Congregations in Slovakia | 303 | 2.13% |
| Evangelical Church | 264 | 1.85% |
| Total | 14,256 | |

In year 2021 was 14,256 people by religion 9670 from Roman Catholic Church, 2293 from None, 830 from Not found out, 609 from Greek Catholic Church, 303 from Christian Congregations in Slovakia, 264 from Evangelical Church, 82 from Jehovah's Witnesses, 74 from Eastern Orthodox Church, 29 from Ad hoc movements, 26 from Other and not ascertained christian church, 21 from Other, 11 from Buddhism, 7 from Seventh-day Adventist Church, 7 from Apostolic Church, 6 from Calvinist Church, 6 from Islam, 4 from United Methodist Church, 3 from Paganism and natural spirituality, 2 from Jewish community, 2 from Hinduism, 2 from Czechoslovak Hussite Church, 2 from Church of Jesus Christ of Latter-day Saints, 1 from Old Catholic Church, 1 from Baptists Church and 1 from Bahá'i Community.

== Etymology ==
The name is of Slovak origin and belongs to the oldest recorded Slovak settlement names in Spiš. (Note: Below is a listing of names by which the town of Levoča has been known or recorded. The names were not necessarily at any time mutually exclusive, and often reflect minor linguistic differences: 1249: Leucha; 1268: Lyucha; 1271: Lewcha; 1277: Lyucha; 1284: Leuche, Lyuche, Leiuche; 1408: Lewscen; 1479: Lewcsouia; 1497: Leutschaw; 1773: Lewucža; 1786: Lewoče, Lőcse (Hungarian), Leutschau (German), Leuchovia (Latin), Leutschovia, Leutsaria; 1808: Leutsovia, Lőcse, Leutschau, Lewoča; 1863 – 1913: official name: Lőcse; since 1918: official name: Levoča)It was originally the name of the stream Lěvoča, a tributary of the river Hornád (present-day Levočský potok). The name probably derived from the adjective lěva (left, a left tributary); the linguist Rudolf Krajčovič has also suggested as an origin the word lěvoča meaning "regularly flooded area”.

== History ==
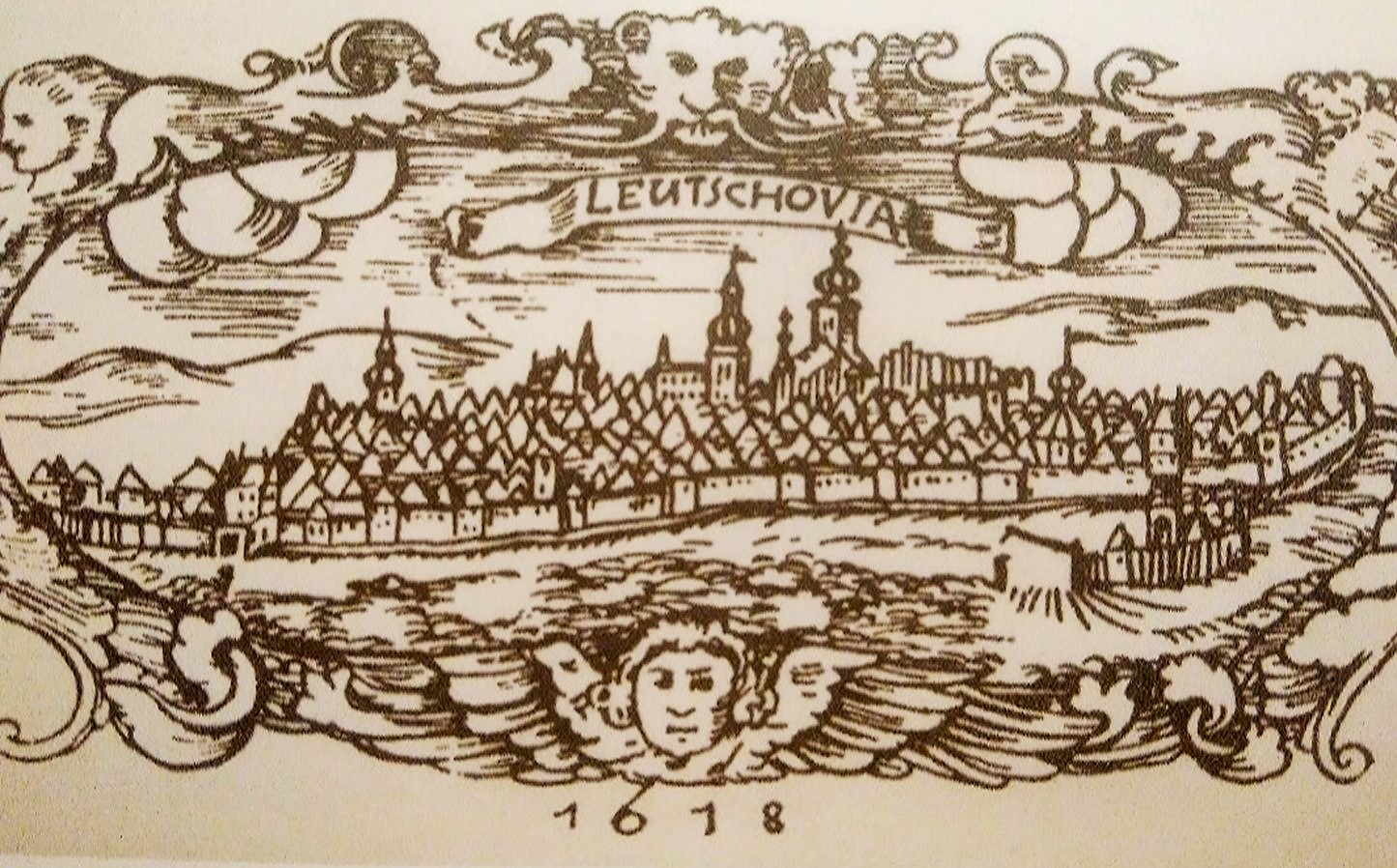
View of Levoča in 1618

Levoča is located in the historical region of Spiš, which was inhabited as early as the Stone Age. In the 11th century, this region was conquered and, subsequently, became part of the Kingdom of Hungary and remained such until 1918. After the Mongol invasions of 1241/1242, the area was also settled by Germans (later known as Zipser Germans). The town became the capital of the Association of Spiš Germans, with a form of self-rule within the Kingdom of Hungary. The oldest written reference to the city of Levoča dates back to 1249. In 1317, Levoča (at that time generally known by the German name of Leutschau - see Chronology below for lists of changing names) received the status of a royal town. In 1321, a wide-ranging right was granted, enticing merchants, craftsmen, and mine owners to settle in this town.

In the 15th century, the town, located on an intersection of trade routes between Poland and Hungary, became a rich center of commerce. It exported iron, copper, furs, leather, corn, and wine. At the same time, the town became an important cultural centre. The English humanist Leonard Cox taught around 1520 in a school in Levoča. The bookseller Brewer from Wittenberg transformed his bookstore into a prolific printing plant that lasted for 150 years. Finally, one of the best-known medieval woodcarvers Master Pavol of Levoča settled here.

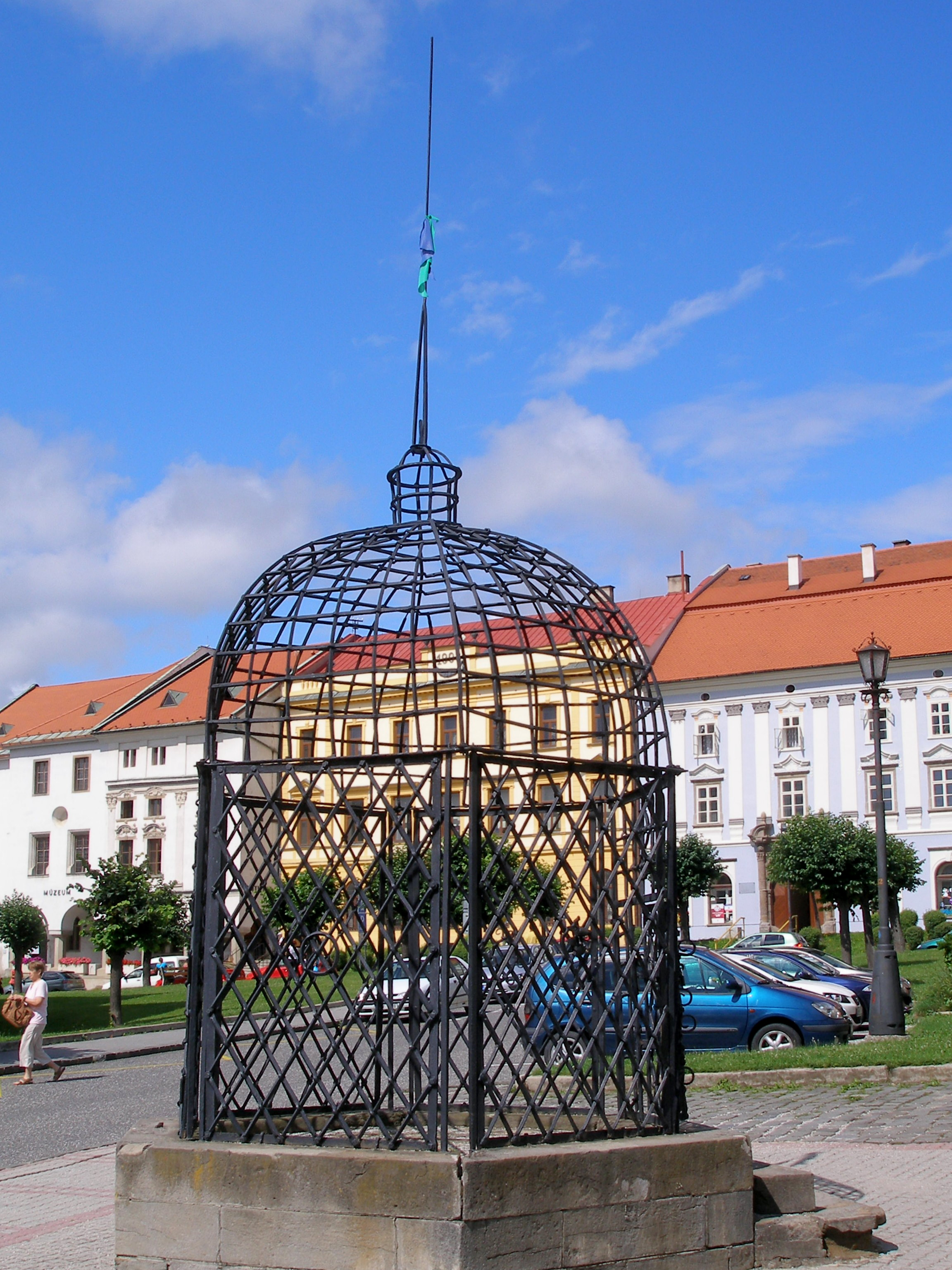
"Cage of Shame", punishment cage outside the old Town Hall

The town kept this cultural and economic status until the end of the 16th century, despite two damaging fires: the first in 1550 destroyed nearly all of the Gothic architecture and another in 1599. In this period of prosperity, several churches were built, and the town had a school, library, pharmacy, and physicians. There was a printing press as early as 1624. Levoča was a center of the Protestant Reformation. The town started to decline during the anti-Habsburg uprisings in the 17th century.

In a lurid sequence of events in 1700, the mayor of the town was accidentally wounded by a local nobleman during a hunt, generating a series of revenge attacks, finally resulting in the murder of the mayor, Karol Kramler, a Saxon magistrate. The mayor's arm was then cut off, embalmed, and preserved in the town hall as a call to further revenge. This became the subject of a Hungarian novel about the town, The Black City, by the writer Kálmán Mikszáth.

At the southern end of the main square, the Evangelical Church, Levoča was constructed from 1823 onwards, and consecrated in 1832. It replaced an earlier articular church outside the walls of the city.

The economic importance of the town was diminished in 1871 when the important new Košice–Bohumín Railway was built just 8 km (5.0 mi) to the south, bypassing Levoča and going through the nearby town of Spišská Nová Ves. Later, in 1892, only a spur line was built from Spišská Nová Ves railway station to Levoča. Before the establishment of independent Czechoslovakia in 1918, Levoča was part of Szepes County within the Kingdom of Hungary. From 1939 to 1945, it was part of the Slovak Republic. On 27 January 1945, the 1st Czechoslovak Army Corps dislodged the Wehrmacht and the Hungarian Army from Levoča, and it was once again part of Czechoslovakia. It has been part of independent Slovakia since 1993.

On 3 July 1995, Levoča was visited by Pope John Paul II. He celebrated a Mass for 650,000 worshippers at the traditional pilgrim site of Mariánska hora, a hill about 2 kilometres (1 mile) north of Levoča with views of the town.

== Historical features ==
The old town is picturesquely sited and still surrounded by most of its ancient walls. In associating the town with Spiš Castle and Žehra in June 2009 as the renamed World Heritage Site of “Levoča, Spišský Hrad, and the Associated Cultural Monuments”, UNESCO cites the town's historic center, its fortifications, and the works of Master Paul of Levoča preserved in the town.

The main entrance to the old town is via the monumental Košice Gate (15th century), behind which is located the ornate baroque Church of the Holy Spirit and the New Minorite Monastery (c. 1750).

The town square (Námestie Majstra Pavla - Master Paul's Square) boasts three major monuments; the quaint Old Town Hall (15th-17th century) which now contains a museum, the domed Evangelical Lutheran Church (1837) and the 14th century of Basilica of St. James (in Slovak: Bazilika svätého Jakuba, often mistakenly referred to in English as St. Jacob's). It houses a magnificently carved and painted wooden Gothic altar, the tallest in the world, (18.62 m (61.09 ft)), created by Master Paul around 1520. The square is very well-preserved (despite one or two modern incursions) and contains several striking buildings which were the townhouses of the local nobility in the late Middle Ages. Also notable in the square is the wrought iron “Cage of Shame”, dating back to the 17th century, used for public punishment of miscreants. A plaque on one of the houses records the printing and publication in the town of the most famous work of Comenius, the Orbis Pictus. Other buildings on the square house a historical museum and a museum dedicated to the work of Master Paul.

Behind the square on Kláštorská Street are the 14th-century church and remains of the old monastery of the Minorites, now incorporated into a Church grammar school. Nearby is the town's Polish Gate, a Gothic construction of the 15th century.

From the 16th century to the end of 1922, Levoča was the administrative center of the province of Szepes (Spiš). Between 1806 – 1826, the Hungarian architect from Eger, Antal Povolny, built a grandiose administration building, the Large Provincial House, as the seat of the town's administration. He adjusted its Classicist style to Levoča's Renaissance character by emphasizing the building's horizontal lines. The House is considered among the most beautiful Provincial Houses in the former Kingdom of Hungary. Today, it is reconstructed and it is the seat of the administration.

The State Regional Archives (Štátny oblastný archív) are in a tan stone building on the north side of the square at nám. Majstra Pavla 60.

== Jewish community ==
Compared to other places in the region, Jewish settlement began comparatively late in Levoča. The city's census data from 1768 and 1828 indicated a lack of Jewish presence, suggesting a prohibition against Jewish settlement until around 1840. The 1840s marked the beginning of Jewish migration to Levoča, mainly from Huncovce and other parts of Eastern Slovakia. This wave of migration led to the establishment of the first Jewish households and sparked the formation of a Jewish community (kehila).

During the 1870s, the kehila saw considerable expansion, leading to the incorporation of additional structures, like a cemetery, in the 1880s. In 1899, the Jewish community inaugurated an expansive synagogue, designed in an Oriental architectural style, situated beyond the city's perimeter. Accompanying this significant structure, a school and a ritual bath, known as a mikveh, were constructed nearby.

Following Slovakia's attainment of autonomy in October 1938, the Jewish population began to face increasing discrimination. On 4 November 1938, 55 Jewish individuals from Levoča, who lacked citizenship, were forcefully relocated to an unclaimed region along the Slovakia-Hungary border, near Plešivec. Held for several weeks without adequate shelter and under challenging conditions, the majority were able to return to their homes only through the concerted efforts of Jewish organizations.

Upon the formation of the Slovak Republic on 14 March 1939, Jewish homes and businesses were subjected to rampant looting and destruction by the Nazi-aligned German minority. A repeat of these incidents occurred on 23 March, with further devastation in August when a Hashomer Hatzair summer camp was attacked and subsequently dissolved. That same year saw the revocation of licenses for numerous Jewish professionals, the closure of Jewish taverns, and dismissals from community service roles.

During World War II, 981 local Jews were deported. The first deportations began in March 1942, at first primarily targeting young women, who were sent to a transit camp in Poprad and then to Auschwitz. More young people were sent to Majdanek, via a transit camp in Žilina.

Starting in March 1942, Jews from Levoča were systematically deported to concentration and extermination camps, beginning with a group of young women sent to Auschwitz. Despite escape attempts, further rounds of deportation included families, hospital patients, and psychiatric care patients, with about 80% of the Jewish population being deported by the end of the year.

Following this wave, a small number of Jews remained in the district, some possessing exemption letters or having converted to escape deportation. However, with the German capture of Levoča in September 1944, the remaining Jews faced intensified persecution. Many were deported or executed, while others found refuge in remote areas or joined partisan groups. Despite resistance, the synagogue, mikveh, school building, and cemetery were desecrated, and widespread hunting of Jews and partisans led to further deportations and executions.

Post-war, some surviving Jews returned to Levoča, reviving kehila life and repairing public buildings. Zionist activities resumed until most Jews immigrated to Israel in 1949. By the 1960s, a small kehila of about 60 people remained, with the once-desecrated cemetery left neglected. As of 1990, only a few Jewish families resided in Levoča.

In 2016, the historic Jewish cemetery was cleared of rubbish and tidied up thanks to the collaborative efforts of local Catholic youth organization Spoločenstvo Pavol, the Slovak Association of Christian Youth Movements, the Union of Slovak Jewish Communities, and the Town of Levoča.

== Twin towns — Sister cities ==
Levoča is twinned with:

- Stary Sącz, Poland
- Łańcut, Poland
- Kalwaria Zebrzydowska, Poland
- Keszthely, Hungary
- Litomyšl, Czech Republic

== Gallery ==
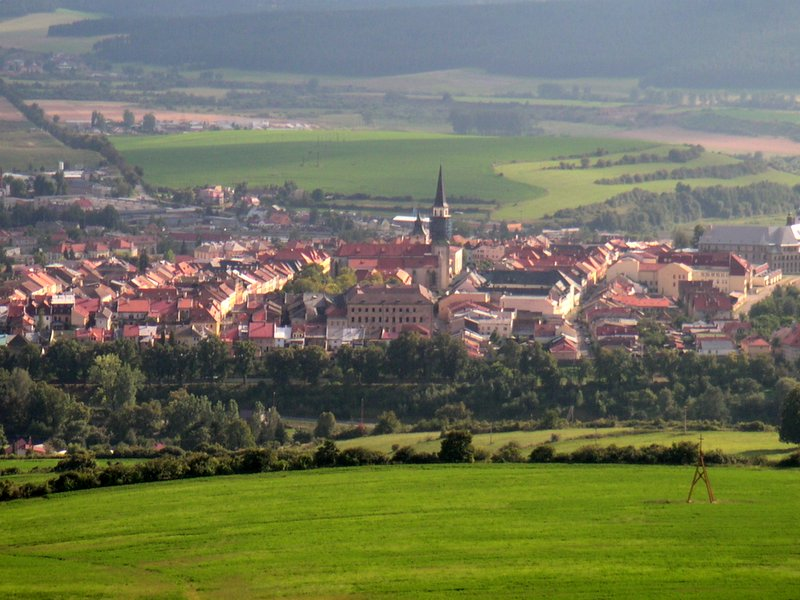
Levoča from Mariánska hora

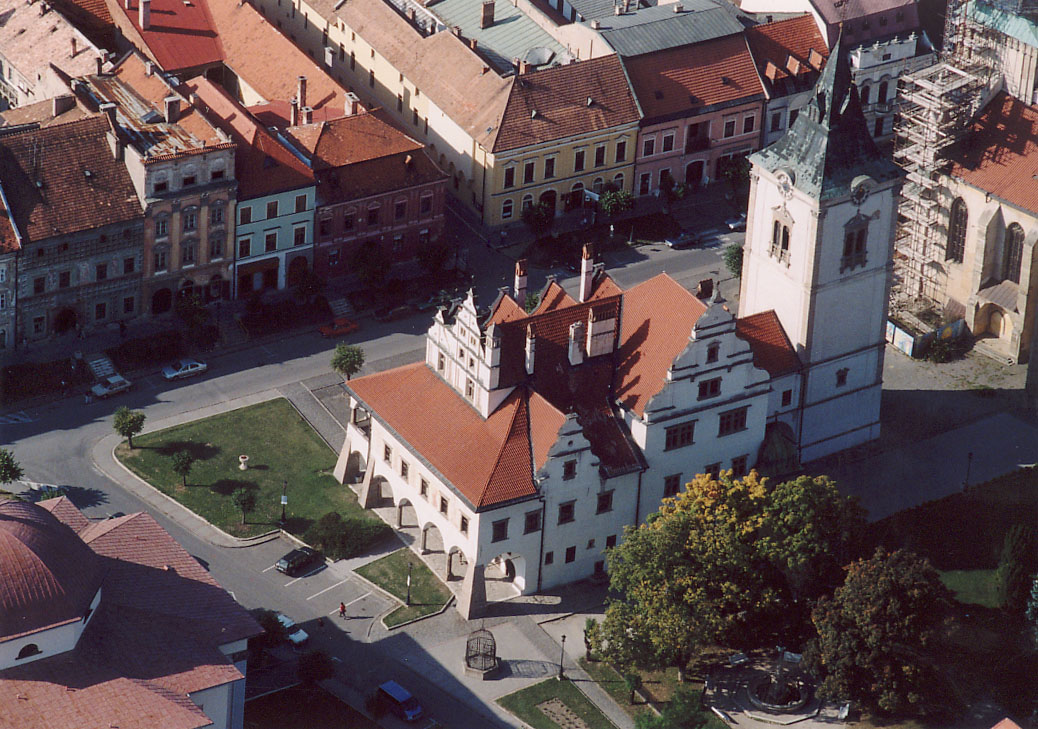
Levoča - Town hall from above

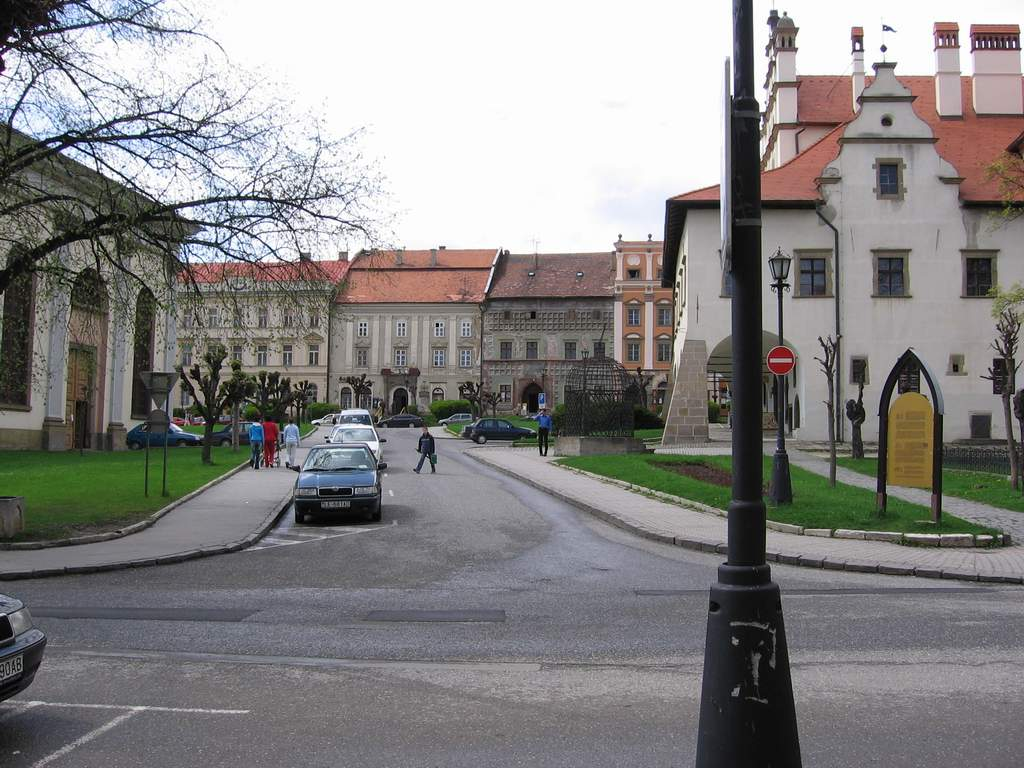
Levoča main square

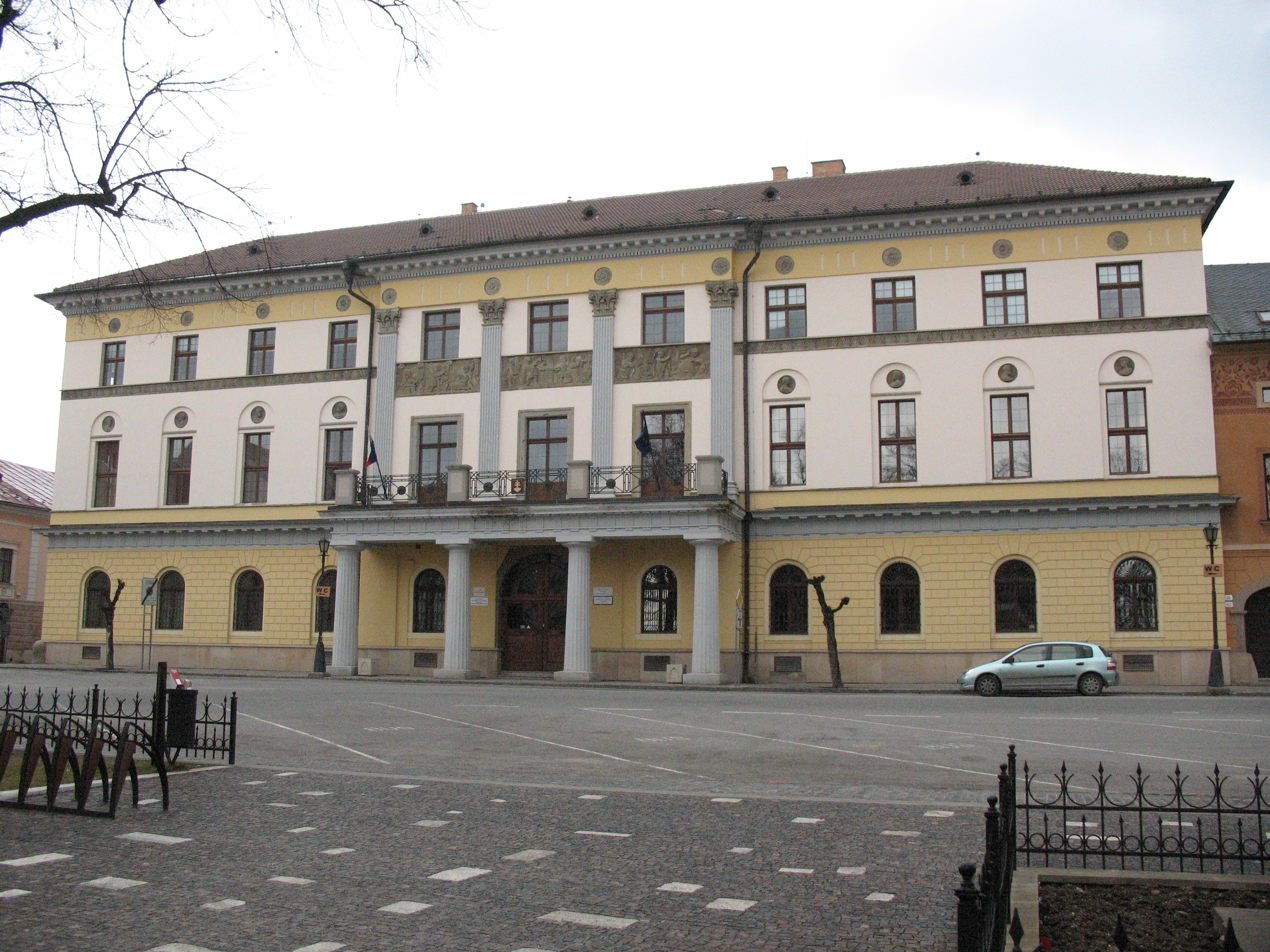
The Large Provincial House

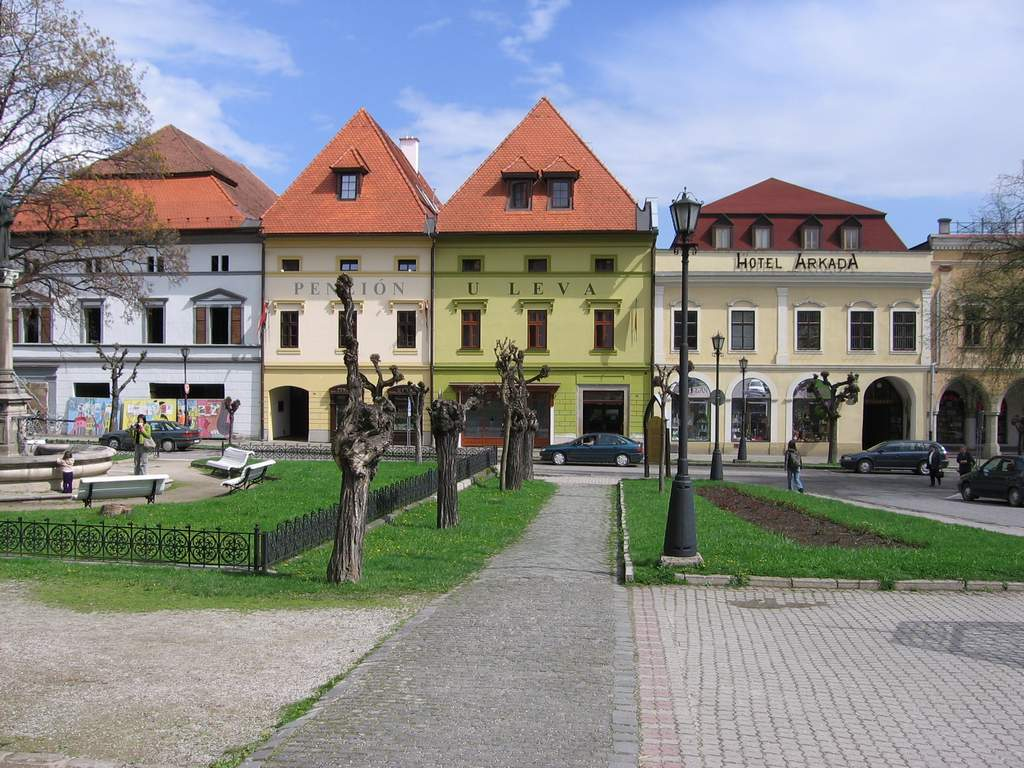
Levoča main square

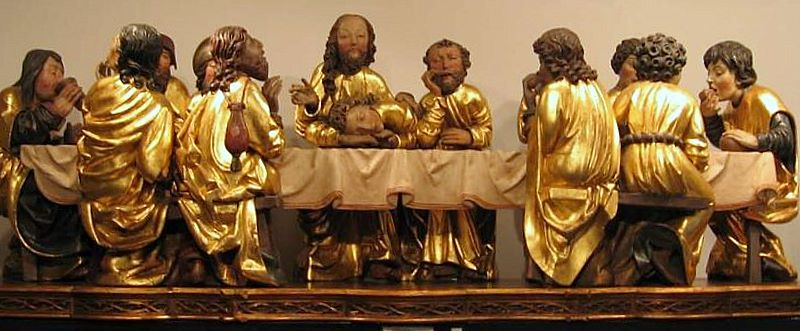
Sculptures from Master Paul's altar in St. James

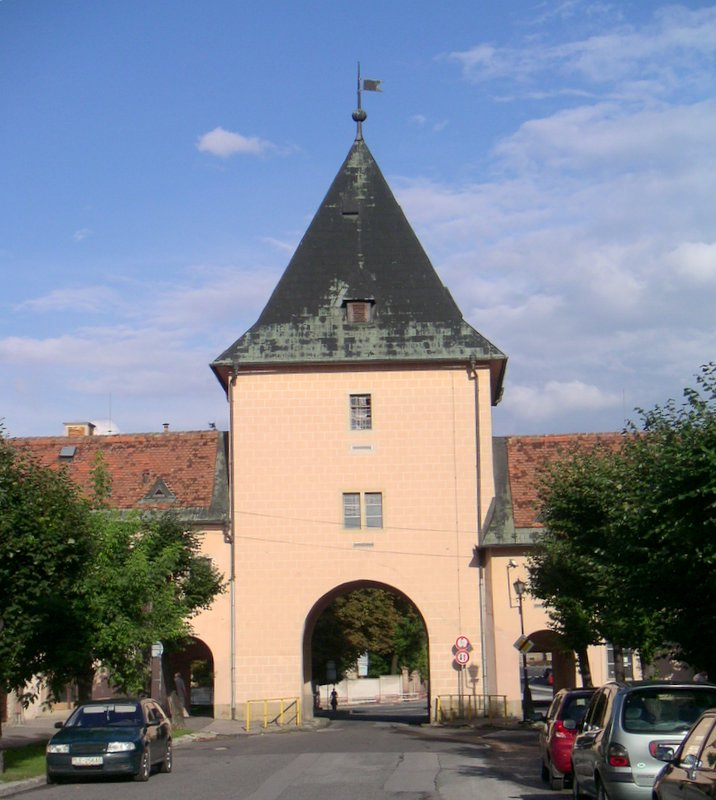
The Košice Gate

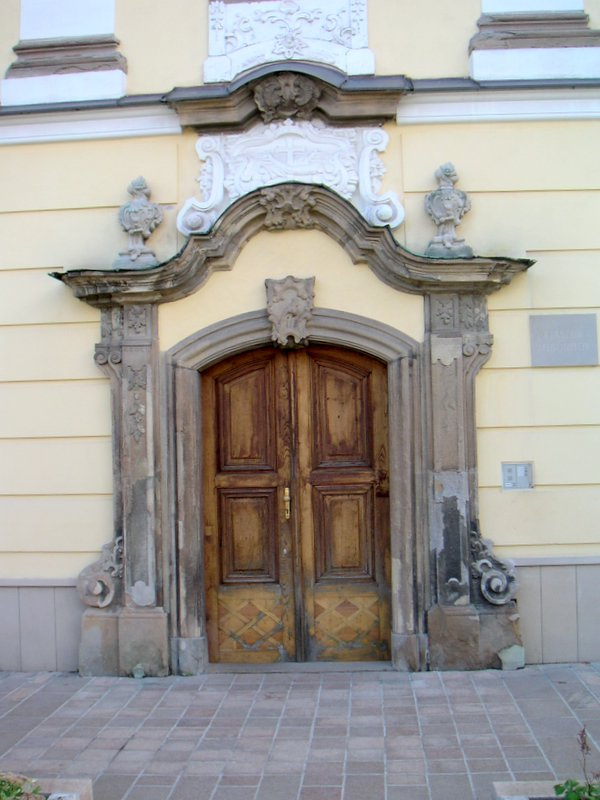
Doorway of the New Minorite Cloisters

== See also ==
- Szepes county
- Spiš
