= Podkonice =

Podkonice Padkóc
- Municipality
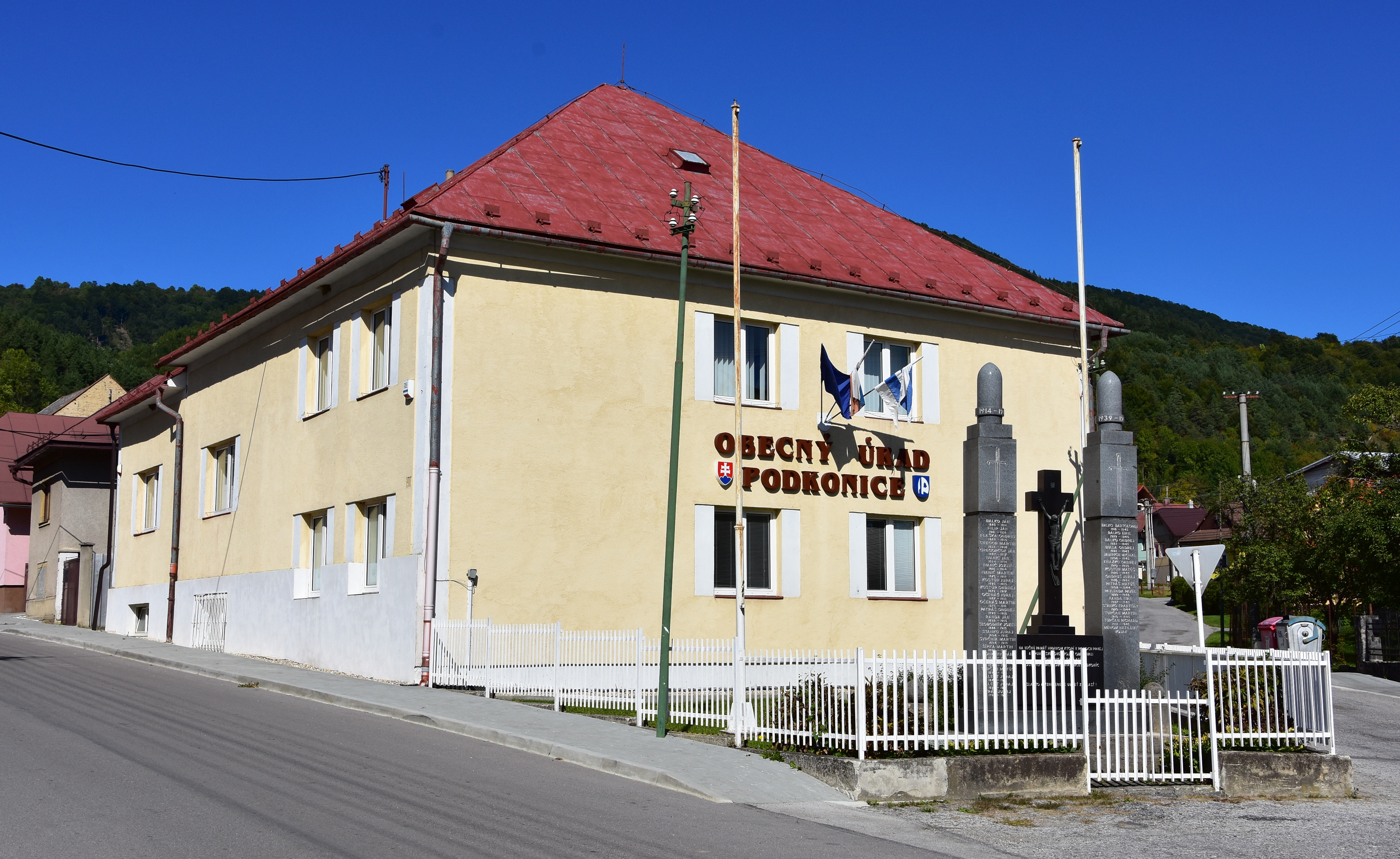
- Municipal office of Podkonice

- Flag

- Location of Podkonice in the Banská Bystrica Region Location of Podkonice in Slovakia
- Coordinates: 48.80°N 19.25°E
- Country: Slovakia
- Region: Banská Bystrica Region
- District: Banská Bystrica District
- First mentioned: 1340

Area
  - Total: 28.47 km^{2} (10.99 sq mi)
- Elevation: 508 m (1,667 ft)

Population (2025)
  - Total: 894
- Time zone: UTC+1 (CET)
  - Summer (DST): UTC+2 (CEST)
- Postal code: 976 41
- Area code: +421 48
- Vehicle registration plate (until 2022): BB
- Website: www.podkonice.sk

Podkonice (Hungarian: Padkóc) is a village and municipality in Banská Bystrica District in the Banská Bystrica Region of central Slovakia.

== Etymology ==
Slovak konica (archaic) - a stable or a shelter for shoeing horses. Podkonica - a nearby location. Koknicze 1340, Podkonicze 1441, Potkonycz 1528, Potkonicz 1773, Podkonice 1920.

== History ==
In historical records the village was first mentioned in the charter of King Karol Robert in the year 1340, where it is mentioned as "possessio Connyce". The village was possibly created on, or closeby the remains of an older settlement before 1250 as a vassal village while Ľupča Castle was being built.

In the beginning, Ľupča Castle did not only have a defensive function, but also served as accommodation for the king and his party during hunting trips in the large parts of the Zvolenské forest (encroaching on the farmstead areas of the present-day villages of Slovenská Ľupča, Podkonice, Priechod and Moštenica).

The inhabitants of Konice at the time were forced to move for some unknown reason. It is assumed that the relocation of the village from where it once stood, to today's area took place at the turn of the 13th and 14th centuries, specifically in the first quarter to the first third of the 14th century at the latest. The old name of the village was still used for some time, or was used alongside the new name currently used today, Podkonice, signifying its close by proximity to the new area.

== Geography ==
The municipality lies at an altitude of 508 metres (1,667 ft) and covers an area of 28.47 km^{2} (10.99 sq mi) (2025).

Podkonice is part of a group of mountainous type villages in the Banská Bystrica region. The village is located at the foot of the southern slopes of the Low Tatras at an altitude of 520 metres (1,710 ft) above sea level. It belongs to the Banská Bystrica District and is also part of the Central Slovak mountain region of folk culture. In March 2000, the village became a member of the "Microregion pod Panský dielom". The bordering municipalities of Baláže, Kynceľová, Nemce, Podkonice, Priechod, Selce, Slovenská Ľupča, and Špania Dolina are the other members of the microregion. The total area of this microregion is 110 km^{2} (42 sq mi), it lies in the altitude range of 360–1,250 m (1,180–4,100 ft) above sea level, and its member villages are home to approximately 8250 inhabitants. The common goal of the microregion's municipalities is partnership and cooperation in the field of tourism, solving issues of employment, and civic amenities, solving environmental problems and preserving folk and local traditions.

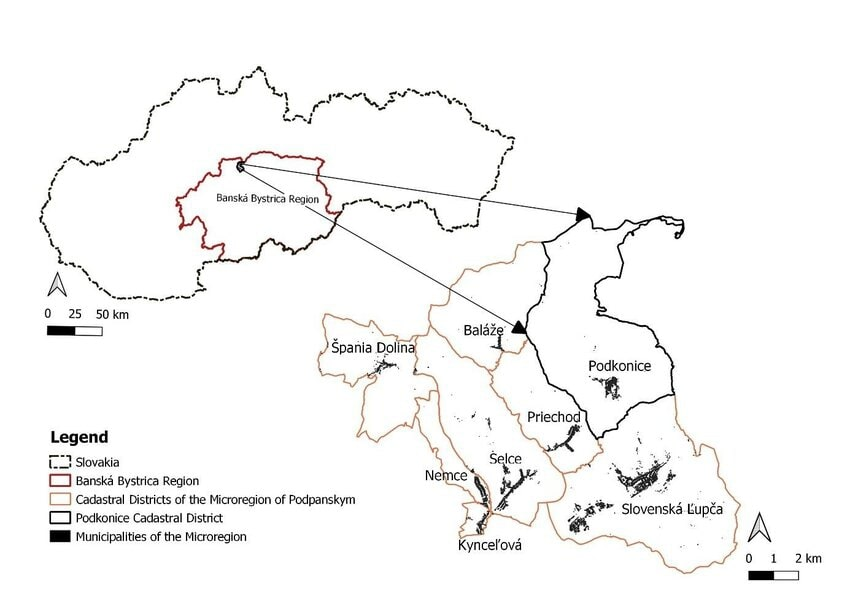
The study area (the location of the Pod Panským dielom microregion within the territory of Slovakia and the location of the Podkonice village in relation to the micro-region Pod Panským dielom)

== Population ==
Population statistic (10 years)
Year	1995	2005	2015	2025
Count	864	866	882	894
Difference		+0.23%	+1.84%	+1.36%

Population statistic
Year	2024	2025
Count	903	894
Difference		−0.99%

It has a population of 894 people (31 December 2025).

=== Ethnicity ===
Census 2021 (1+ %)
Ethnicity	Number	Fraction
Slovak	893	97.7%
Not found out	13	1.42%
Total	914	

In year 2021 was 914 people by ethnicity 893 as Slovak, 13 as Not found out, 8 as Czech, 4 as Serbian, 3 as Rusyn, 3 as Croatian, 2 as German, 2 as Other, 1 as Austrian, 1 as Hungarian and 1 as English.

Note on population: The difference values of population numbers in the table "Population statistic" and in the sections "Ethnicity" & "Religion" is caused by the use of various statistical methods.

=== Religion ===
Census 2021 (1+ %)
Religion	Number	Fraction
Roman Catholic Church	717	78.45%
None	147	16.08%
Evangelical Church	21	2.3%
Not found out	15	1.64%
Total	914	

In year 2021 was 914 people by religion 717 from Roman Catholic Church, 147 from None, 21 from Evangelical Church, 15 from Not found out, 9 from Greek Catholic Church, 2 from Other and not ascertained christian church, 1 from Eastern Orthodox Church, 1 from Christian Congregations in Slovakia and 1 from Other.

== Sport ==
FK Podkonice - football club currently competing in 3rd league - group west (3. Liga (Slovakia))
