= Ľupča Castle =

Castle in Slovakia

Ľupča castle
- Slovenská Ľupča, Slovakia
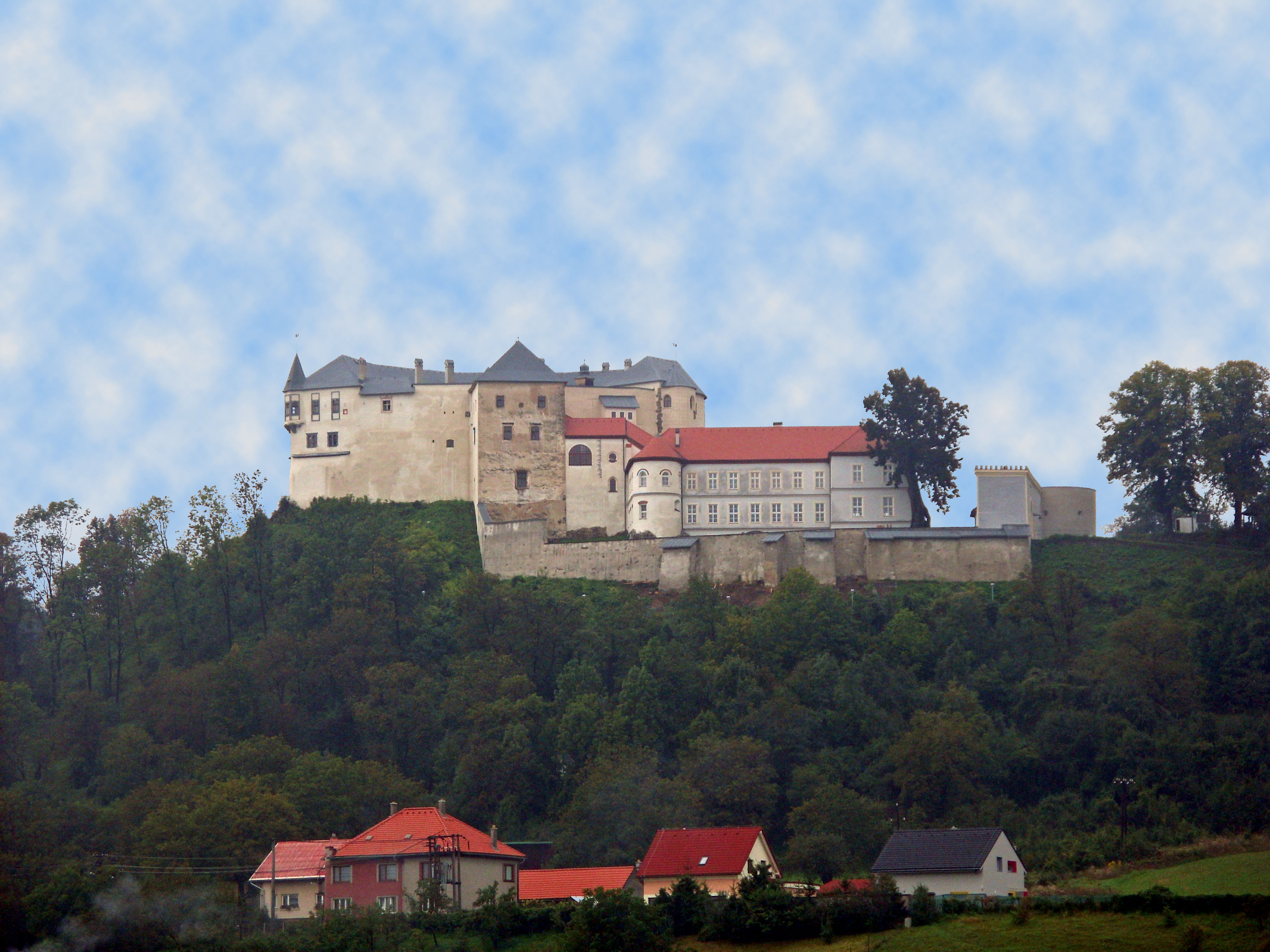
- Ľupča castle

Site information
- Type: Castle
- Owner: Zeleziarne Podbrezová a.s.
- Open to the public: Limited
- Condition: Mostly renovated

Location
- Coordinates: 48.77°N 19.28°E

Site history
- Built: 13th century
- Built by: Béla IV of Hungary

The Ľupča castle towers above the village Slovenská Ľupča. It's the highest located castle building in the Hron area (Pohronie). The castle is built on the north side of a relatively narrow fold of the Hron which is closed by the slopes of the Slovak Ore Mountains (Slovenské Rudohorie) from the south and by the slopes of the Low Tatras from the north. The oldest part of the castle is built on the isolated rock on the last hill of the Low Tatras jag with an altitude of 375m above sea level.

== History ==
=== 13th century ===
After the plundering invasion of the Tatars in 1241 only the stone architecture fortresses withstood the invaders. Therefore Béla IV of Hungary decided to build defensive structures and castles in the middle of the 13th century. The Ľupča castle was one of them. According to preserved written reports the castle was built on an important medieval road called Via Magna and served as a checkpoint on the road from Banská Bystrica to Brezno. In 1255 the castle was mentioned in conjunction with the letters patent for the town Banská Bystrica, chartered by Béla IV in the Ľupča castle. The castle and the extramural monastery were important centres in that time. This was demonstrated by the dispute cause between Béla IV and his son Stephen V of Hungary. The cause was settled in the castle on 3 August 1263 with attendance of highly placed city dignitaries and clergy, to whom belonged also the Ľupča monastery principal, guardian Thomas.

The 13th century was characterised by patronage of the monarchy to the castle. This was confirmed by frequent visits of monarchs associated with game hunting in the surrounding forests. The Ľupča caste became a temporary residence of the Hungarian kings, including Béla IV in 1258, 1263, 1265 and from 1267 till 1269. After his death his successor Stephen V visited the castle only twice, as it is reported in documents, in August 1270 and one year later when he confirmed the privilege to comes Ondrej (vogt of Banská Bystrica) for possession of part of the land. The following surrounding villeinage villages belonged to the castle in that period:

- Slovenská Ľupča
- Lučatín
- Priechod
- Sv. Ondrej
- Brusno
- Dubová (part of modern Nemecká)
- Zámostie
- Lopej
- Brezno

After the short period of rule of Stephen V, Ladislaus IV of Hungary mounted the throne. His mother Elizabeth the Cuman ruled during his infancy. She visited the castle for the first time in 1274. When Ladislaus IV was recognised as an adult, he visited the castle in 1278 and granted Poniky land to master Filip for his services in the battle on the Marchfeld against the Czech monarch Ottokar II of Bohemia.

When the Arpad family died out with the passing of Andrew III of Hungary, the owners of the castle changed frequently. As a royal castle it was often devolved by conquests to the hands of noblemen who did not respect the royal sovereignty. In that period the castle history is connected with the name of the last district mayor of the Zólyom County, magister knight Donč. His close relationships with Ľupča were well documented in the papal memorandum of 1323 where Pope John XXII allowed Donč to be buried in the crypt of the church in Ľupča together with his ancestors. From this memorandum it is also known that not only Zvolen but also Ľupča was a final resting place of Zvolen's county mayors. During 1315-1335 Donč also constructed the stone monastery to the above-mentioned church, the presentday church (one-aisle building) of Zvolenská Ľupča (now Slovenská Ľupča).

=== 14th century ===
In the 14th century the castle was alternatively the residence of the Hungarian kings. Charles I of Hungary who visited the castle in November 1310 and 1340 confirmed the municipal privileges for Zvolenská Ľupča. Visits of his successor Louis I of Hungary were more frequent. This is shown in the documents issued in the Ľupča castle in that period (1348, 1358, 1360 and 1361). In 1367 Louis I signed a document for Pavol Sclavius in the castle to invite colonists to the village Hronec. Sclavius would become the prefect of the new village. During 1369-1382 Louis I dwelled in the Ľupča castle, what is documented in the charter from 1379 promoting village Ľubietová to a town. In 1380 Louis I granted Brezno's guests the "Siavnica right", marked the chotar and allowed the free vote for mayor and priest. After one year the Brezno's representatives visited king Louis I in Ľupča castle again to ask for confirmation of their rights by the royal charter.
