= FK - 34 Brusno - Ondrej =

Slovak football club

FK – 34 Brusno – Ondrej
- Full name: FK – 34 Brusno – Ondrej
- Founded: 1934
- Ground: Stadium FK - 34 Brusno - Ondrej, Brusno, Slovakia
- Capacity: 550 (320 seats)
- League: 6. Liga
- 2024–25: 7. Liga, 2nd (promoted)

FK – 34 Brusno – Ondrej is a Slovak association football club located in Brusno. It currently plays in the sixth tier of football. The club's colours are black and white.
