= Balaze =

Balaze may refer to:

- Baláže, a village of Slovakia
- Balazé, a commune in Brittany, France
