= Môlča =

Môlča Zólyommócsa
- Municipality
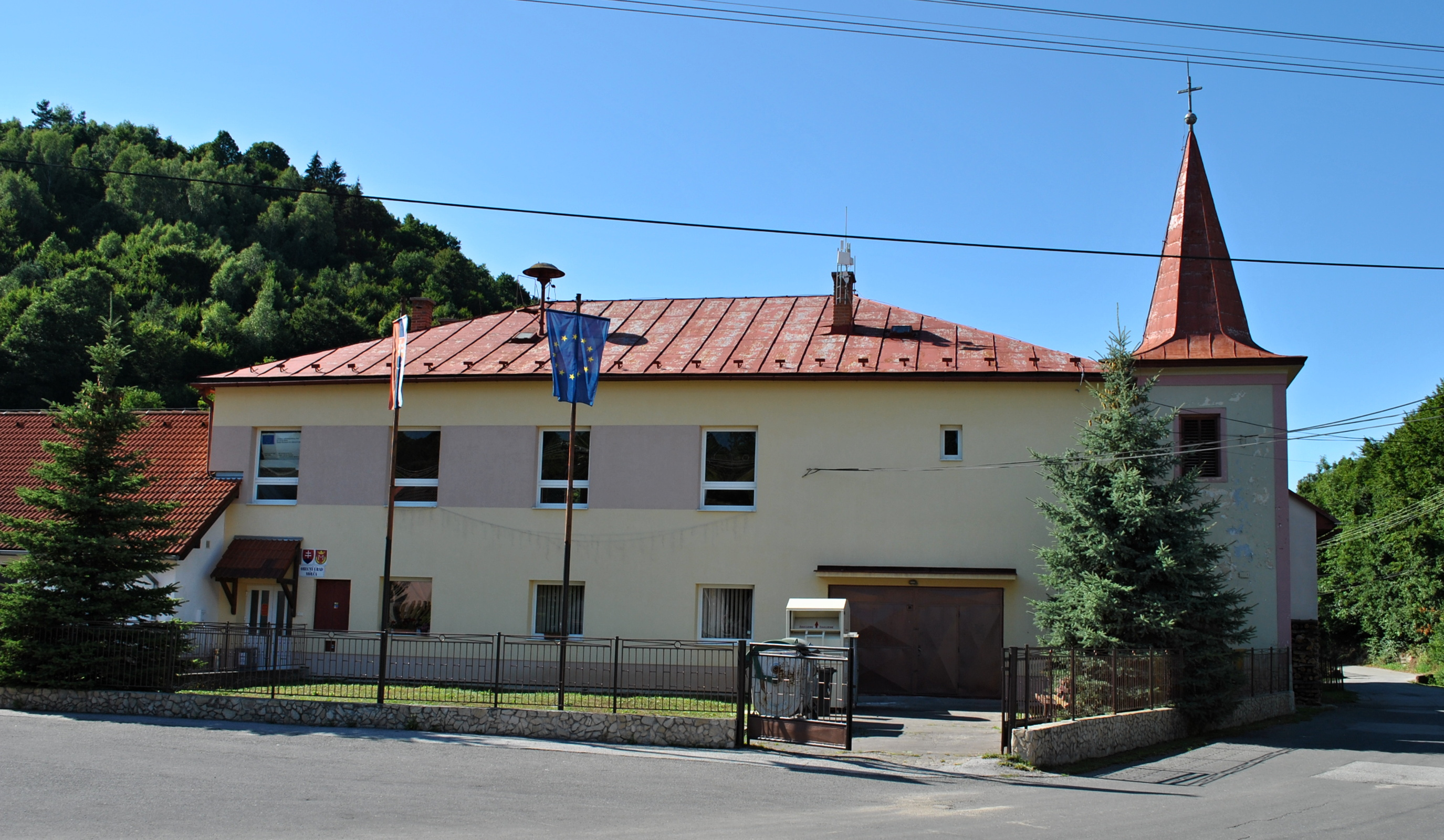

- Flag

- Location of Môlča in the Banská Bystrica Region Location of Môlča in Slovakia
- Coordinates: 48.72°N 19.23°E
- Country: Slovakia
- Region: Banská Bystrica Region
- District: Banská Bystrica District
- First mentioned: 1293

Area
  - Total: 9.39 km^{2} (3.63 sq mi)
- Elevation: 453 m (1,486 ft)

Population (2025)
  - Total: 432
- Time zone: UTC+1 (CET)
  - Summer (DST): UTC+2 (CEST)
- Postal code: 974 06
- Area code: +421 48
- Vehicle registration plate (until 2022): BB
- Website: www.molca.sk

Môlča (Hungarian: Zólyommócsa) is a village and municipality in Banská Bystrica District in the Banská Bystrica Region of central Slovakia.

== History ==
In historical records the village was first mentioned in 1293.

== Geography ==
The municipality lies at an altitude of 453 metres (1,486 ft) and covers an area of 9.39 km^{2} (3.63 sq mi) (2025).

== Population ==
Population statistic (10 years)
Year	1995	2005	2015	2025
Count	301	365	370	432
Difference		+21.26%	+1.36%	+16.75%

Population statistic
Year	2024	2025
Count	435	432
Difference		−0.68%

It has a population of 432 people (31 December 2025).

=== Ethnicity ===
Census 2021 (1+ %)
Ethnicity	Number	Fraction
Slovak	386	93.68%
Romani	48	11.65%
Not found out	24	5.82%
Total	412	

In year 2021 was 412 people by ethnicity 386 as Slovak, 48 as Romani, 24 as Not found out, 1 as Rusyn and 1 as Russian.

Note on population: The difference values of population numbers in the table "Population statistic" and in the sections "Ethnicity" & "Religion" is caused by the use of various statistical methods.

=== Religion ===
Census 2021 (1+ %)
Religion	Number	Fraction
Roman Catholic Church	148	35.92%
None	148	35.92%
Evangelical Church	95	23.06%
Not found out	15	3.64%
Total	412	

In year 2021 was 412 people by religion 148 from Roman Catholic Church, 148 from None, 95 from Evangelical Church, 15 from Not found out, 4 from Greek Catholic Church, 1 from Christian Congregations in Slovakia and 1 from Ad hoc movements.
