= Sebedín-Bečov =

Sebedín-Bečov Szebedénybecsó
- Municipality
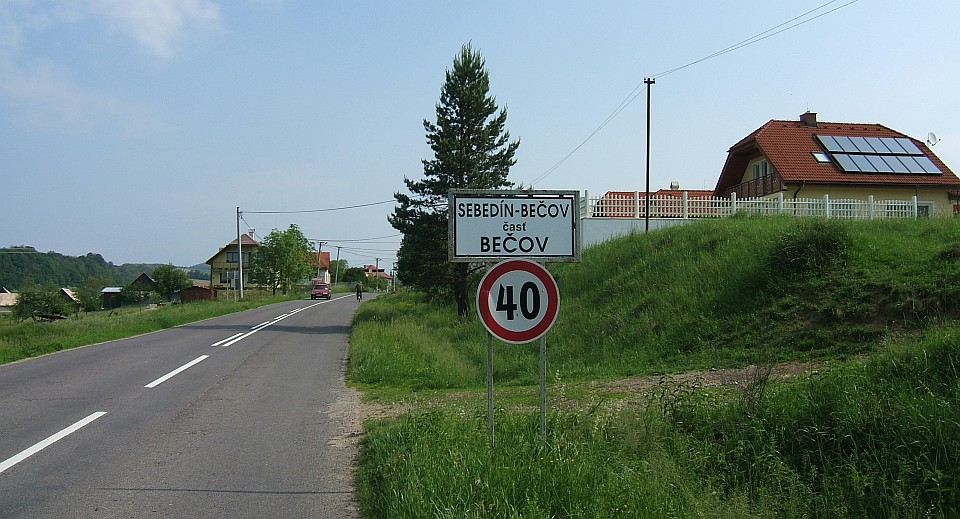

- Flag

- Location of Sebedín-Bečov in the Banská Bystrica Region Location of Sebedín-Bečov in Slovakia
- Coordinates: 48.64°N 19.24°E
- Country: Slovakia
- Region: Banská Bystrica Region
- District: Banská Bystrica District
- First mentioned: 1406

Area
  - Total: 9.62 km^{2} (3.71 sq mi)
- Elevation: 374 m (1,227 ft)

Population (2025)
  - Total: 349
- Time zone: UTC+1 (CET)
  - Summer (DST): UTC+2 (CEST)
- Postal code: 974 01
- Area code: +421 48
- Vehicle registration plate (until 2022): BB
- Website: www.sebedinbecov.sk

Sebedín-Bečov (Hungarian: Szebedénybecsó) is a village and municipality in Banská Bystrica District in the Banská Bystrica Region of central Slovakia.

== History ==
In historical records the village was first mentioned in 1406.

== Geography ==
The municipality lies at an altitude of 374 metres (1,227 ft) and covers an area of 9.62 km^{2} (3.71 sq mi) (2025).

== Population ==
Population statistic (10 years)
Year	1995	2005	2015	2025
Count	329	397	369	349
Difference		+20.66%	−7.05%	−5.42%

Population statistic
Year	2024	2025
Count	360	349
Difference		−3.05%

It has a population of 349 people (31 December 2025).

=== Ethnicity ===
Census 2021 (1+ %)
Ethnicity	Number	Fraction
Slovak	350	97.76%
Not found out	6	1.67%
Czech	4	1.11%
Total	358	

In year 2021 was 358 people by ethnicity 350 as Slovak, 6 as Not found out, 4 as Czech, 1 as Jewish, 1 as Ukrainian and 1 as Romani.

Note on population: The difference values of population numbers in the table "Population statistic" and in the sections "Ethnicity" & "Religion" is caused by the use of various statistical methods.

=== Religion ===
Census 2021 (1+ %)
Religion	Number	Fraction
Evangelical Church	153	42.74%
None	98	27.37%
Roman Catholic Church	81	22.63%
Not found out	13	3.63%
Greek Catholic Church	9	2.51%
Total	358	

In year 2021 was 358 people by religion 153 from Evangelical Church, 98 from None, 81 from Roman Catholic Church, 13 from Not found out, 9 from Greek Catholic Church, 2 from Ad hoc movements, 1 from Eastern Orthodox Church and 1 from Other.
