= Horné Pršany =

- Municipality
- Flag

- Location of Horné Pršany in the Banská Bystrica Region Location of Horné Pršany in Slovakia
- Coordinates: 48.70°N 19.08°E
- Country: Slovakia
- Region: Banská Bystrica Region
- District: Banská Bystrica District
- First mentioned: 1407

Area
  - Total: 3.52 km^{2} (1.36 sq mi)
- Elevation: 641 m (2,103 ft)

Population (2025)
  - Total: 384
- Time zone: UTC+1 (CET)
  - Summer (DST): UTC+2 (CEST)
- Postal code: 974 01
- Area code: +421 48
- Vehicle registration plate (until 2022): BB
- Website: www.horneprsany.sk

Horné Pršany (Hungarian: Felsőperesény) is a village and municipality of the Banská Bystrica District in the Banská Bystrica Region of Slovakia

== Geography ==
The municipality lies at an altitude of 641 metres (2,103 ft) and covers an area of 3.52 km^{2} (1.36 sq mi) (2025).

== History ==
In historical records, the village was first mentioned in 1407 (as Persen).

== Population ==
Population statistic (10 years)
Year	1995	2005	2015	2025
Count	345	385	389	384
Difference		+11.59%	+1.03%	−1.28%

Population statistic
Year	2024	2025
Count	386	384
Difference		−0.51%

It has a population of 384 people (31 December 2025).

=== Ethnicity ===
Census 2021 (1+ %)
Ethnicity	Number	Fraction
Slovak	388	97.48%
Not found out	10	2.51%
Total	398	

In year 2021 was 398 people by ethnicity 388 as Slovak, 10 as Not found out, 2 as Czech, 2 as Italian, 2 as Canadian, 1 as Ukrainian, 1 as Romani, 1 as Hungarian and 1 as Other.

Note on population: The difference values of population numbers in the table "Population statistic" and in the sections "Ethnicity" & "Religion" is caused by the use of various statistical methods.

=== Religion ===
Census 2021 (1+ %)
Religion	Number	Fraction
None	155	38.94%
Evangelical Church	118	29.65%
Roman Catholic Church	100	25.13%
Jehovah's Witnesses	7	1.76%
Not found out	7	1.76%
Ad hoc movements	6	1.51%
Total	398	

In year 2021 was 398 people by religion 155 from None, 118 from Evangelical Church, 100 from Roman Catholic Church, 7 from Jehovah's Witnesses, 7 from Not found out, 6 from Ad hoc movements, 1 from Calvinist Church, 1 from Paganism and natural spirituality, 1 from Other and not ascertained christian church, 1 from Other and 1 from Buddhism.
