= Turecká =

Turecká Török
- Municipality
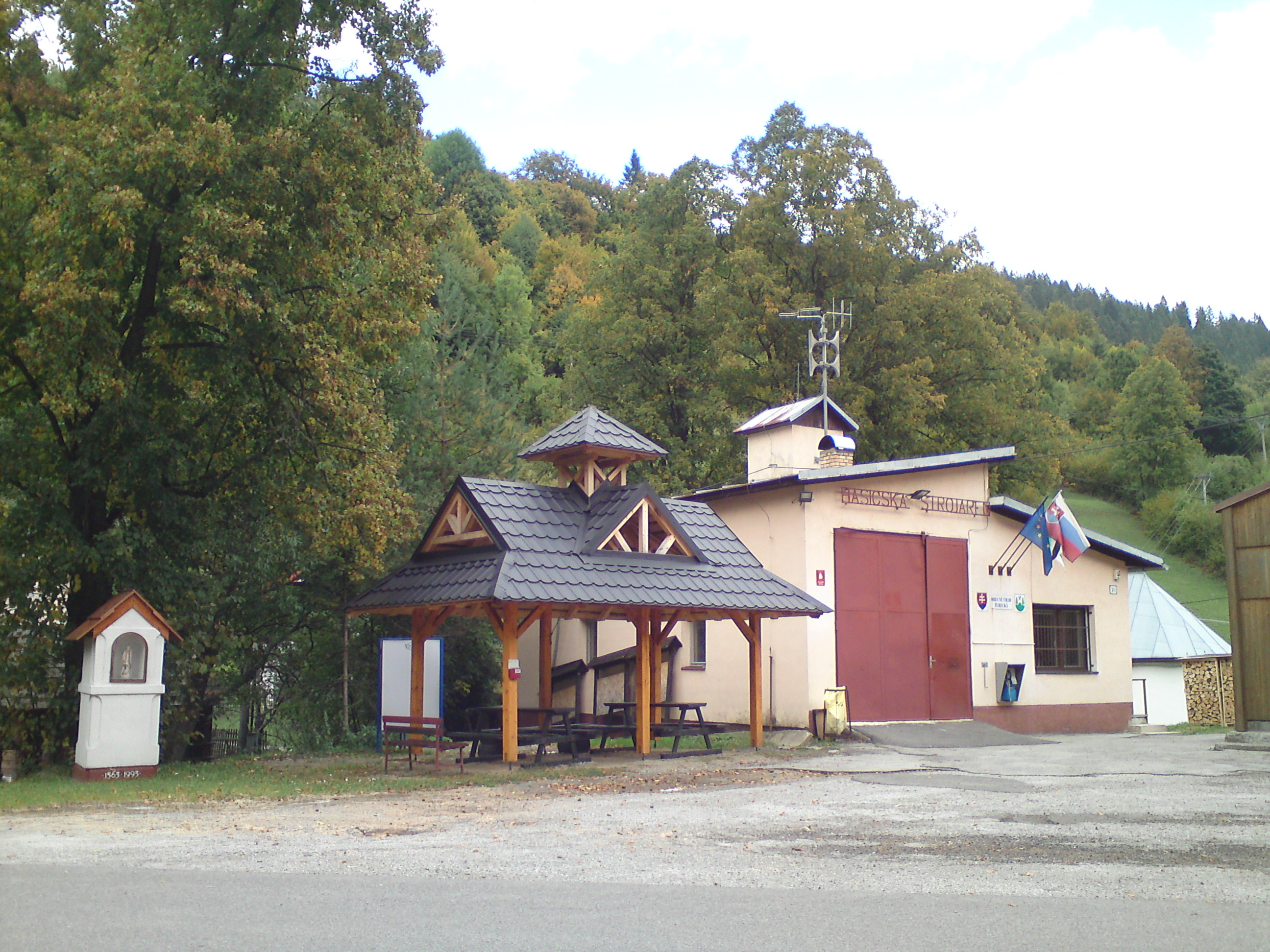

- Flag

- Location of Turecká in the Banská Bystrica Region Location of Turecká in Slovakia
- Coordinates: 48.85°N 19.08°E
- Country: Slovakia
- Region: Banská Bystrica Region
- District: Banská Bystrica District
- First mentioned: 1563

Area
  - Total: 10.16 km^{2} (3.92 sq mi)
- Elevation: 620 m (2,030 ft)

Population (2025)
  - Total: 166
- Time zone: UTC+1 (CET)
  - Summer (DST): UTC+2 (CEST)
- Postal code: 976 02
- Area code: +421 48
- Vehicle registration plate (until 2022): BB

Turecká (Hungarian: Török) is a village and municipality in Banská Bystrica District in the Banská Bystrica Region of central Slovakia.

== History ==
In historical records, the village was first mentioned in 1563.

== Geography ==
The municipality lies at an altitude of 620 metres (2,030 ft) and covers an area of 10.16 km^{2} (3.92 sq mi) (2025).

== Population ==
Population statistic (10 years)
Year	1995	2005	2015	2025
Count	138	141	146	166
Difference		+2.17%	+3.54%	+13.69%

Population statistic
Year	2024	2025
Count	165	166
Difference		+0.60%

It has a population of 166 people (31 December 2025).

=== Ethnicity ===
Census 2021 (1+ %)
Ethnicity	Number	Fraction
Slovak	155	97.48%
German	2	1.25%
Hungarian	2	1.25%
Total	159	

In year 2021 was 159 people by ethnicity 155 as Slovak, 2 as German, 2 as Hungarian, 1 as Czech, 1 as Austrian, 1 as Not found out and 1 as Other.

Note on population: The difference values of population numbers in the table "Population statistic" and in the sections "Ethnicity" & "Religion" is caused by the use of various statistical methods.

=== Religion ===
Census 2021 (1+ %)
Religion	Number	Fraction
Roman Catholic Church	100	62.89%
None	52	32.7%
Not found out	2	1.26%
Ad hoc movements	2	1.26%
Total	159	

In year 2021 was 159 people by religion 100 from Roman Catholic Church, 52 from None, 2 from Not found out, 2 from Ad hoc movements, 1 from Other, 1 from Greek Catholic Church and 1 from Evangelical Church.
