= Dúbravica =

Dúbravica Dubravica
- Municipality
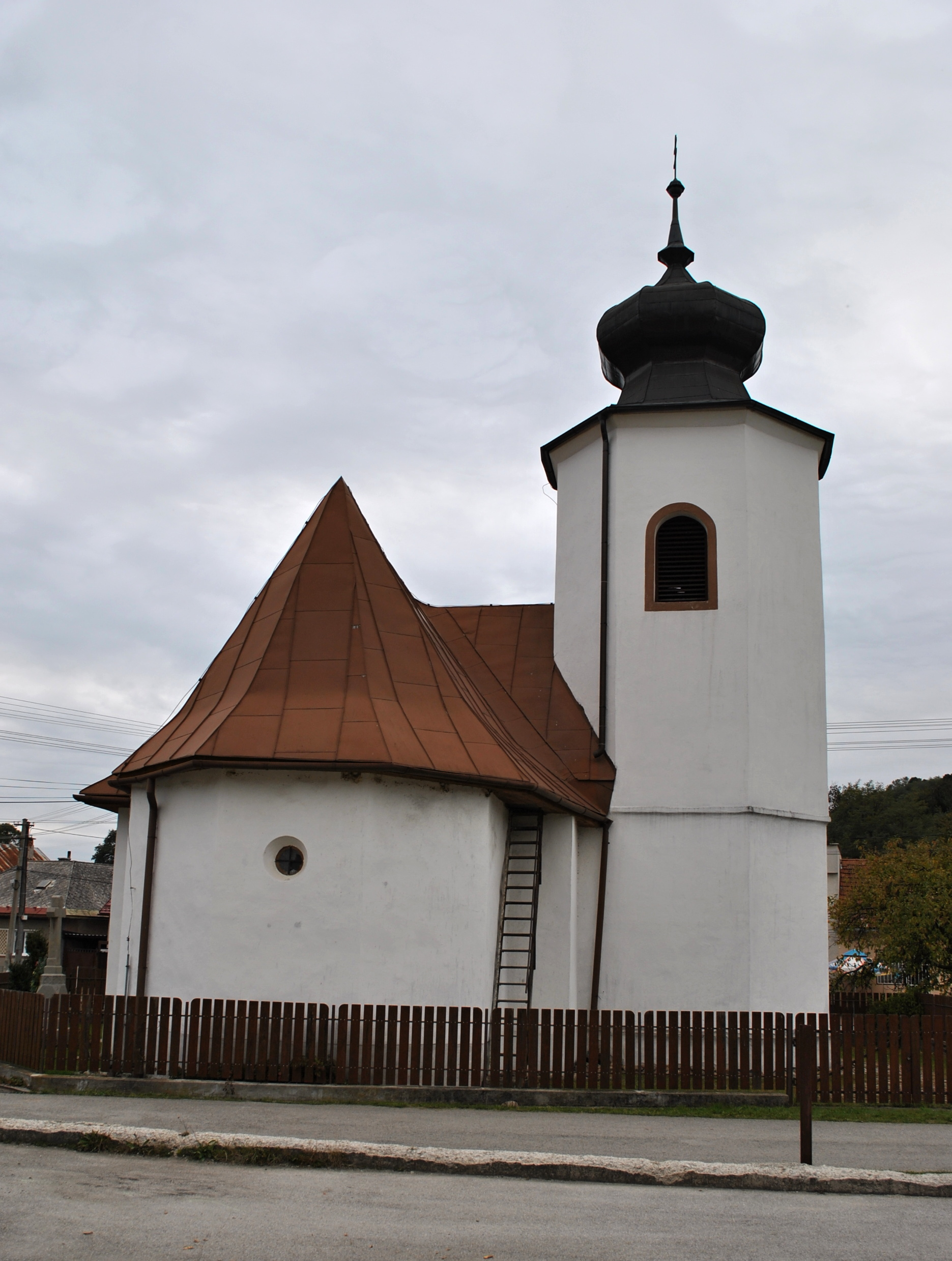

- Flag

- Location of Dúbravica in the Banská Bystrica Region Location of Dúbravica in Slovakia
- Coordinates: 48.68°N 19.28°E
- Country: Slovakia
- Region: Banská Bystrica Region
- District: Banská Bystrica District
- First mentioned: 1400

Area
  - Total: 8.50 km^{2} (3.28 sq mi)
- Elevation: 428 m (1,404 ft)

Population (2025)
  - Total: 412
- Time zone: UTC+1 (CET)
  - Summer (DST): UTC+2 (CEST)
- Postal code: 976 33
- Area code: +421 48
- Vehicle registration plate (until 2022): BB
- Website: dubravica.sk

Dúbravica (Hungarian: Dubravica) is a village and municipality of the Banská Bystrica District in the Banská Bystrica Region of Slovakia

== Geography ==
The municipality lies at an altitude of 428 metres (1,404 ft) and covers an area of 8.50 km^{2} (3.28 sq mi) (2025).

== History ==
In historical records, the village was first mentioned in 1400 (1400 Dubrauice, 1424 Dubrawyche) when it belonged to the castle of Slovenská Ľupča. In 1540, its mines were granted by Count János Dubravicky to Kremnica. From 1582 to 1657, it had to pay tributes to the Ottoman Empire.

== Population ==
Population statistic (10 years)
Year	1995	2005	2015	2025
Count	329	361	413	412
Difference		+9.72%	+14.40%	−0.24%

Population statistic
Year	2024	2025
Count	408	412
Difference		+0.98%

It has a population of 412 people (31 December 2025).

=== Ethnicity ===
Census 2021 (1+ %)
Ethnicity	Number	Fraction
Slovak	382	91.38%
Not found out	41	9.8%
Romani	7	1.67%
Total	418	

In year 2021 was 418 people by ethnicity 382 as Slovak, 41 as Not found out, 7 as Romani, 3 as English, 2 as Czech, 1 as Irish, 1 as Rusyn and 1 as Other.

Note on population: The difference values of population numbers in the table "Population statistic" and in the sections "Ethnicity" & "Religion" is caused by the use of various statistical methods.

=== Religion ===
Census 2021 (1+ %)
Religion	Number	Fraction
Roman Catholic Church	175	41.87%
Evangelical Church	121	28.95%
None	77	18.42%
Not found out	33	7.89%
Total	418	

In year 2021 was 418 people by religion 175 from Roman Catholic Church, 121 from Evangelical Church, 77 from None, 33 from Not found out, 2 from Calvinist Church, 2 from Jehovah's Witnesses, 2 from Christian Congregations in Slovakia, 2 from Ad hoc movements, 1 from Jewish community, 1 from Islam, 1 from Other and 1 from Greek Catholic Church.
