= Banská Bystrica District =

Coordinates: 48°44′N 19°09′E

- District
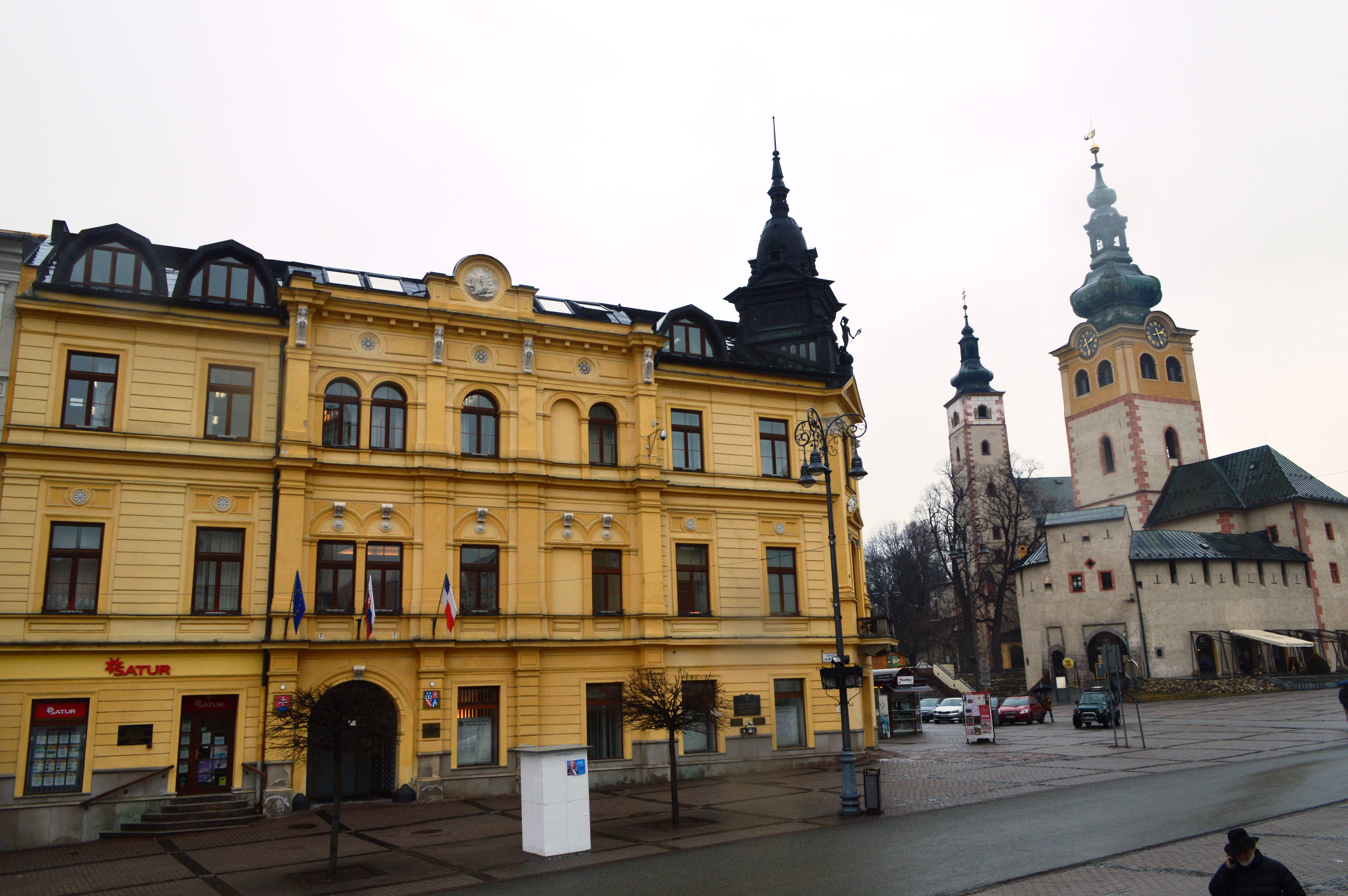
- Country: Slovakia
- Region: Banská Bystrica Region
- Seat: Banská Bystrica

Area
  - Total: 809.44 km^{2} (312.53 sq mi)

Population (2025)
  - Total: 106,000
- Time zone: UTC+1 (CET)
  - Summer (DST): UTC+2 (CEST)
- Telephone prefix: 048
- Vehicle registration plate (until 2022): BB
- Municipalities: 42

Banská Bystrica District (Slovak: okres Banská Bystrica) is a district in the Banská Bystrica Region of central Slovakia. Until 1918, the area belonged to the county of Zvolen within the Kingdom of Hungary.

Historical population
Year	Pop.	±%
1970	76,331	—
1980	93,994	+23.1%
1991	111,244	+18.4%
2001	111,984	+0.7%
2011	111,242	−0.7%
2021	108,730	−2.3%
Source: Censuses

== Population ==
Population statistic (10 years)
Year	1995	2005	2015	2025
Count	112,810	111,186	110,920	106,000
Difference		−1.43%	−0.23%	−4.43%

Population statistic
Year	2024	2025
Count	106,604	106,000
Difference		−0.56%

It has a population of 106,000 people (31 December 2025).

=== Ethnicity ===
Census 2021 (1+ %)
Ethnicity	Number	Fraction
Slovak	101,800	91.37%
Not found out	5545	4.97%
Czech	1212	1.08%
Total	111,411	

In year 2021 was 111,411 people by ethnicity 101,800 as Slovak, 5545 as Not found out, 1212 as Czech, 586 as Romani, 485 as Hungarian, 459 as Other, 252 as Russian, 158 as Rusyn, 149 as German, 147 as Ukrainian, 79 as Polish, 53 as Italian, 49 as Moravian, 44 as Croatian, 43 as Jewish, 42 as Vietnamese, 42 as English, 36 as Serbian, 31 as Austrian, 26 as Romanian, 25 as Chinese, 23 as Greek, 22 as French, 22 as Bulgarian, 20 as Irish, 19 as Canadian, 17 as Albanian, 16 as Turkish, 4 as Silesian, 4 as Iranian and 1 as Korean.

Note on population: The difference values of population numbers in the table "Population statistic" and in the sections "Ethnicity" & "Religion" is caused by the use of various statistical methods.

=== Religion ===
Census 2021 (1+ %)
Religion	Number	Fraction
Roman Catholic Church	42,443	39.04%
None	41,649	38.3%
Evangelical Church	13,737	12.63%
Not found out	6139	5.65%
Greek Catholic Church	1286	1.18%
Total	108,730	

In year 2021 was 108,730 people by religion 42,443 from Roman Catholic Church, 41,649 from None, 13,737 from Evangelical Church, 6139 from Not found out, 1286 from Greek Catholic Church, 463 from Ad hoc movements, 435 from Other and not ascertained christian church, 430 from Other, 293 from Eastern Orthodox Church, 260 from Seventh-day Adventist Church, 249 from Christian Congregations in Slovakia, 210 from Baptists Church, 206 from Jehovah's Witnesses, 184 from Buddhism, 148 from Church of the Brethren, 114 from Paganism and natural spirituality, 97 from Apostolic Church, 90 from Calvinist Church, 85 from United Methodist Church, 72 from Islam, 47 from Jewish community, 27 from Hinduism, 22 from Old Catholic Church, 21 from Bahá'i Community, 15 from Czechoslovak Hussite Church, 5 from Church of Jesus Christ of Latter-day Saints and 3 from New Apostolic Church.

== Municipalities ==
Municipality	Area [km^{2}]	Population
Badín	34.38	2,163
Baláže	14.21	227
Banská Bystrica	103.36	73,054
Brusno	43.51	2,105
Čerín	11.53	438
Dolná Mičiná	9.46	524
Dolný Harmanec	44.29	261
Donovaly	17.50	281
Dúbravica	8.50	412
Harmanec	7.75	808
Hiadeľ	16.55	496
Horná Mičiná	15.69	692
Horné Pršany	3.52	384
Hrochoť	34.74	1,425
Hronsek	7.30	693
Kordíky	9.97	510
Králiky	1.64	713
Kynceľová	1.16	394
Ľubietová	61.03	1,262
Lučatín	10.88	666
Malachov	6.26	1,125
Medzibrod	17.07	1,369
Môlča	9.39	432
Moštenica	13.42	250
Motyčky	13.08	105
Nemce	4.10	1,129
Oravce	4.72	181
Podkonice	28.47	894
Pohronský Bukovec	14.47	122
Poniky	59.03	1,544
Povrazník	3.34	146
Priechod	11.21	1,009
Riečka	6.82	866
Sebedín-Bečov	9.62	349
Selce	19.99	2,089
Slovenská Ľupča	32.32	3,259
Staré Hory	41.56	568
Strelníky	17.46	746
Špania Dolina	12.72	237
Tajov	9.28	663
Turecká	10.16	166
Vlkanová	7.77	1,243

Population and area values are current for year 2025.
