= Medzibrod =

Medzibrod Mezőköz
- Municipality
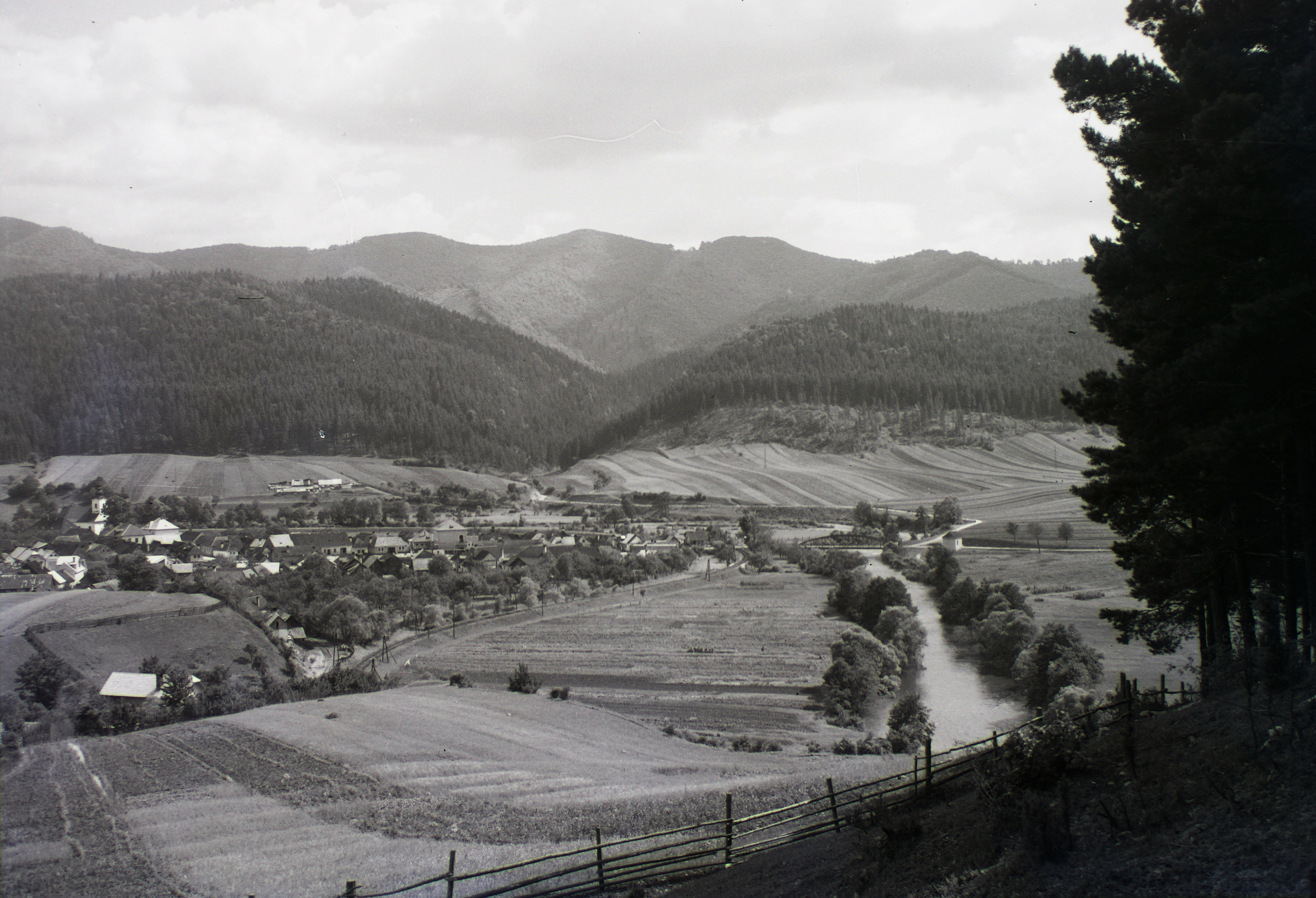

- Flag

- Location of Medzibrod in the Banská Bystrica Region Location of Medzibrod in Slovakia
- Coordinates: 48.80°N 19.35°E
- Country: Slovakia
- Region: Banská Bystrica Region
- District: Banská Bystrica District
- First mentioned: 1455

Government
  - Mayor: Pavol Svetlík

Area
  - Total: 17.07 km^{2} (6.59 sq mi)
- Elevation: 400 m (1,300 ft)

Population (2025)
  - Total: 1,369
- Time zone: UTC+1 (CET)
  - Summer (DST): UTC+2 (CEST)
- Postal code: 976 96
- Area code: +421 48
- Vehicle registration plate (until 2022): BB
- Website: www.obecmedzibrod.sk

Medzibrod (Hungarian: Mezőköz) is a village and municipality in Banská Bystrica District in the Banská Bystrica Region of central Slovakia.

== History ==
In historical records, the village was first mentioned in 1455.

== Geography ==
The municipality lies at an altitude of 400 metres (1,300 ft) and covers an area of 17.07 km^{2} (6.59 sq mi) (2025).

== Population ==
Population statistic (10 years)
Year	1995	2005	2015	2025
Count	1296	1296	1356	1369
Difference		+0%	+4.62%	+0.95%

Population statistic
Year	2024	2025
Count	1372	1369
Difference		−0.21%

It has a population of 1369 people (31 December 2025).

=== Ethnicity ===
Census 2021 (1+ %)
Ethnicity	Number	Fraction
Slovak	1347	97.46%
Not found out	40	2.89%
Total	1382	

In year 2021 was 1382 people by ethnicity 1347 as Slovak, 40 as Not found out, 3 as Czech, 2 as Romani, 2 as German, 2 as Hungarian, 1 as Russian, 1 as Other and 1 as Croatian.

Note on population: The difference values of population numbers in the table "Population statistic" and in the sections "Ethnicity" & "Religion" is caused by the use of various statistical methods.

=== Religion ===
Census 2021 (1+ %)
Religion	Number	Fraction
Roman Catholic Church	1007	72.87%
None	269	19.46%
Evangelical Church	56	4.05%
Not found out	38	2.75%
Total	1382	

In year 2021 was 1382 people by religion 1007 from Roman Catholic Church, 269 from None, 56 from Evangelical Church, 38 from Not found out, 4 from Greek Catholic Church, 2 from Paganism and natural spirituality, 1 from Old Catholic Church, 1 from Jehovah's Witnesses, 1 from Christian Congregations in Slovakia, 1 from Other, 1 from Baptists Church and 1 from Ad hoc movements.
