= Vlkanová =

Vlkanová Farkaspetőfalva
- Municipality
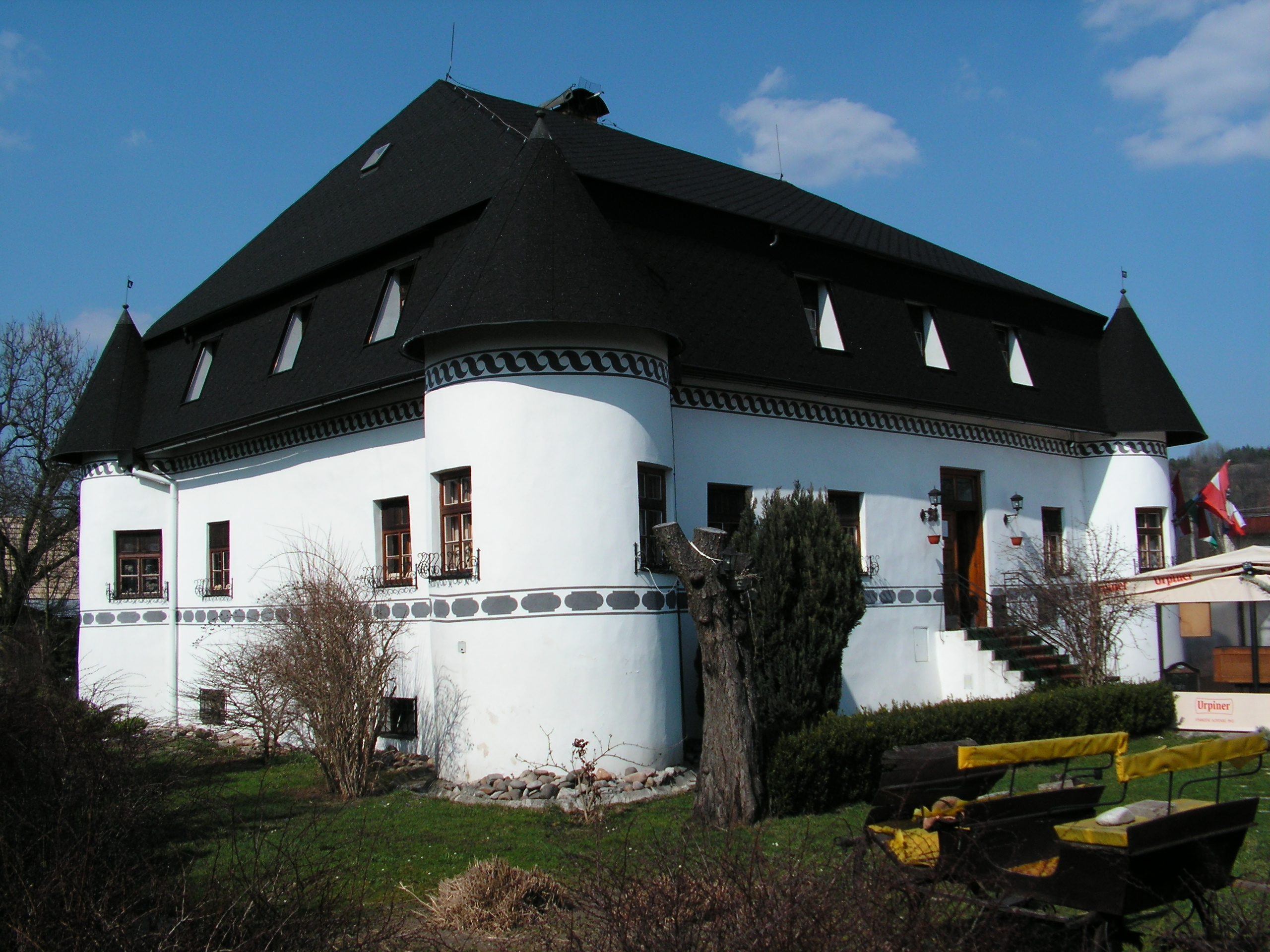
- Manor in Vlkanová

- Flag

- Location of Vlkanová in the Banská Bystrica Region Location of Vlkanová in Slovakia
- Coordinates: 48.67°N 19.15°E
- Country: Slovakia
- Region: Banská Bystrica Region
- District: Banská Bystrica District
- First mentioned: 1511

Area
  - Total: 7.77 km^{2} (3.00 sq mi)
- Elevation: 317 m (1,040 ft)

Population (2025)
  - Total: 1,243
- Time zone: UTC+1 (CET)
  - Summer (DST): UTC+2 (CEST)
- Postal code: 976 31
- Area code: +421 48
- Vehicle registration plate (until 2022): BB
- Website: www.vlkanova.sk

Vlkanová (Hungarian: Farkaspetőfalva) is a village and municipality in Banská Bystrica District in the Banská Bystrica Region of central Slovakia.

== History ==
In historical records the village was first mentioned in 1294.

== Geography ==
The municipality lies at an altitude of 317 metres (1,040 ft) and covers an area of 7.77 km^{2} (3.00 sq mi) (2025).

== Population ==
Population statistic (10 years)
Year	1995	2005	2015	2025
Count	827	1085	1314	1243
Difference		+31.19%	+21.10%	−5.40%

Population statistic
Year	2024	2025
Count	1273	1243
Difference		−2.35%

It has a population of 1243 people (31 December 2025).

=== Ethnicity ===
Census 2021 (1+ %)
Ethnicity	Number	Fraction
Slovak	1218	94.19%
Not found out	54	4.17%
Romani	26	2.01%
Total	1293	

In year 2021 was 1293 people by ethnicity 1218 as Slovak, 54 as Not found out, 26 as Romani, 12 as Czech, 10 as Ukrainian, 4 as Other, 3 as Russian, 3 as German, 3 as Hungarian and 2 as Rusyn.

Note on population: The difference values of population numbers in the table "Population statistic" and in the sections "Ethnicity" & "Religion" is caused by the use of various statistical methods.

=== Religion ===
Census 2021 (1+ %)
Religion	Number	Fraction
None	524	40.53%
Roman Catholic Church	501	38.75%
Evangelical Church	172	13.3%
Not found out	55	4.25%
Total	1293	

In year 2021 was 1293 people by religion 524 from None, 501 from Roman Catholic Church, 172 from Evangelical Church, 55 from Not found out, 10 from Greek Catholic Church, 7 from Eastern Orthodox Church, 5 from Other, 4 from Ad hoc movements, 3 from United Methodist Church, 2 from Old Catholic Church, 2 from Calvinist Church, 2 from Baptists Church, 1 from Paganism and natural spirituality, 1 from Other and not ascertained christian church, 1 from Christian Congregations in Slovakia, 1 from Church of the Brethren, 1 from Seventh-day Adventist Church and 1 from Buddhism.
