= Hiadeľ =

Hiadeľ Hédel
- Municipality
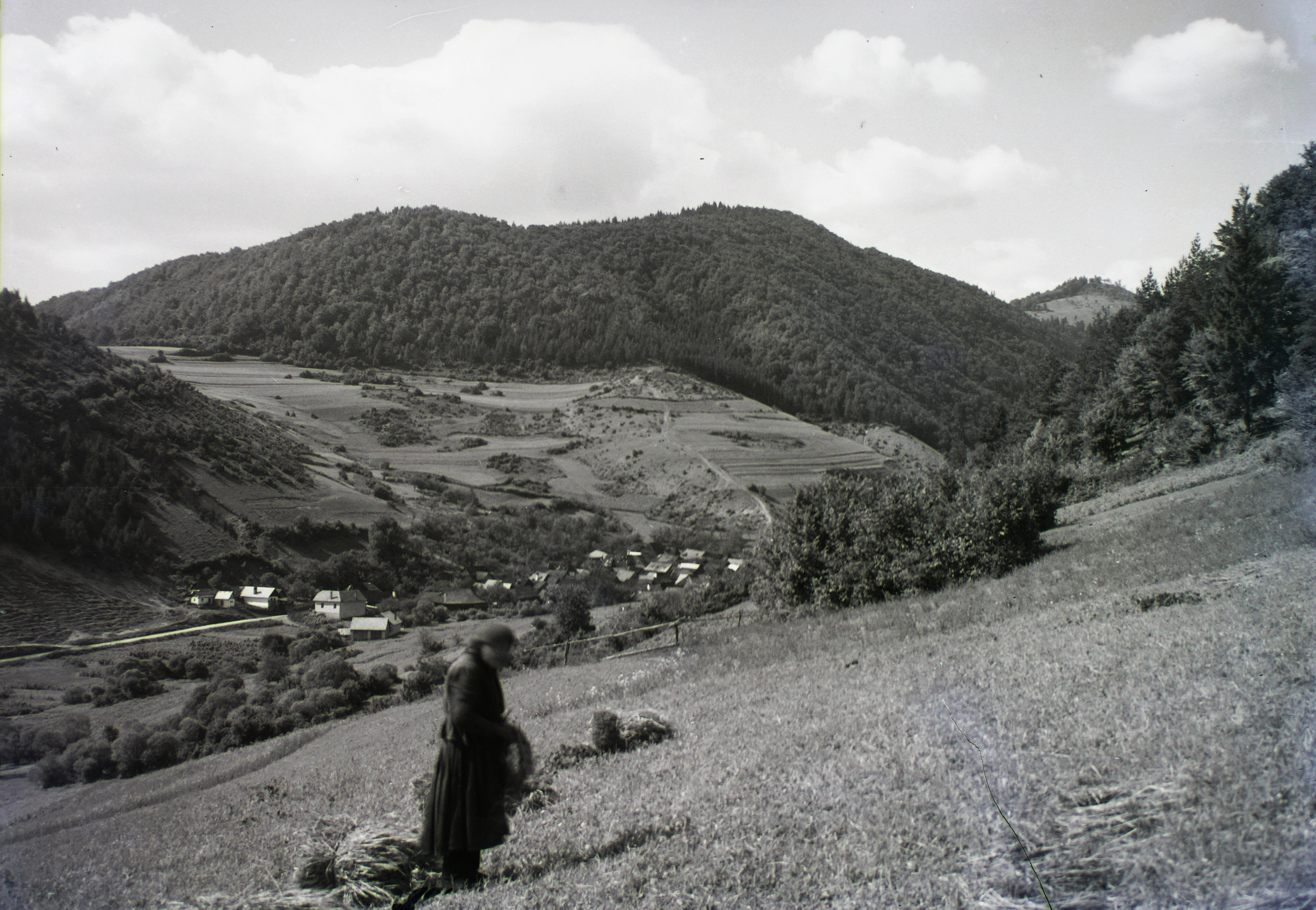

- Flag

- Location of Hiadeľ in the Banská Bystrica Region Location of Hiadeľ in Slovakia
- Coordinates: 48.82°N 19.33°E
- Country: Slovakia
- Region: Banská Bystrica Region
- District: Banská Bystrica District
- First mentioned: 1424

Area
  - Total: 16.55 km^{2} (6.39 sq mi)
- Elevation: 487 m (1,598 ft)

Population (2025)
  - Total: 496
- Time zone: UTC+1 (CET)
  - Summer (DST): UTC+2 (CEST)
- Postal code: 976 61
- Area code: +421 48
- Vehicle registration plate (until 2022): BB
- Website: www.hiadel.sk

Hiadeľ (German: Hödlerdorf, Hödlergrund; Hungarian: Hédel) is a village and municipality of the Banská Bystrica District in the Banská Bystrica Region of Slovakia.

== Geography ==
The municipality lies at an altitude of 487 metres (1,598 ft) and covers an area of 16.55 km^{2} (6.39 sq mi) (2025).

== History ==
In historical records, the village was first mentioned in 1424. It belonged to the castle of Slovenská Ľupča.

== Population ==
Population statistic (10 years)
Year	1995	2005	2015	2025
Count	568	526	520	496
Difference		−7.39%	−1.14%	−4.61%

Population statistic
Year	2024	2025
Count	490	496
Difference		+1.22%

It has a population of 496 people (31 December 2025).

=== Ethnicity ===
Census 2021 (1+ %)
Ethnicity	Number	Fraction
Slovak	504	98.43%
Not found out	7	1.36%
Total	512	

In year 2021 was 512 people by ethnicity 504 as Slovak, 7 as Not found out, 5 as Other and 2 as Czech.

Note on population: The difference values of population numbers in the table "Population statistic" and in the sections "Ethnicity" & "Religion" is caused by the use of various statistical methods.

=== Religion ===
Census 2021 (1+ %)
Religion	Number	Fraction
Roman Catholic Church	368	71.88%
None	102	19.92%
Evangelical Church	23	4.49%
Total	512	

In year 2021 was 512 people by religion 368 from Roman Catholic Church, 102 from None, 23 from Evangelical Church, 4 from Not found out, 4 from Greek Catholic Church, 4 from Ad hoc movements, 3 from Eastern Orthodox Church, 2 from United Methodist Church, 1 from Jehovah's Witnesses and 1 from Other.
