= Malachov =

Malachov Malakóperesény
- Municipality
- Flag

- Location of Malachov in the Banská Bystrica Region Location of Malachov in Slovakia
- Coordinates: 48.72°N 19.08°E
- Country: Slovakia
- Region: Banská Bystrica Region
- District: Banská Bystrica District
- First mentioned: 1327

Government
  - Mayor: Slivka Ondrej

Area
  - Total: 6.26 km^{2} (2.42 sq mi)
- Elevation: 464 m (1,522 ft)

Population (2025)
  - Total: 1,125
- Time zone: UTC+1 (CET)
  - Summer (DST): UTC+2 (CEST)
- Postal code: 974 01
- Area code: +421 48
- Vehicle registration plate (until 2022): BB
- Website: www.malachov.sk

Malachov (Hungarian: Malakóperesény) is a village and municipality in Banská Bystrica District in the Banská Bystrica Region of central Slovakia.

== History ==
In historical records the village was first mentioned in 1327.

== Geography ==
The municipality lies at an altitude of 464 metres (1,522 ft) and covers an area of 6.26 km^{2} (2.42 sq mi) (2025).

== Population ==
Population statistic (10 years)
Year	1995	2005	2015	2025
Count	812	919	1091	1125
Difference		+13.17%	+18.71%	+3.11%

Population statistic
Year	2024	2025
Count	1132	1125
Difference		−0.61%

It has a population of 1125 people (31 December 2025).

=== Ethnicity ===
Census 2021 (1+ %)
Ethnicity	Number	Fraction
Slovak	1081	96.77%
Not found out	25	2.23%
Czech	13	1.16%
Total	1117	

In year 2021 was 1117 people by ethnicity 1081 as Slovak, 25 as Not found out, 13 as Czech, 8 as Russian, 6 as Hungarian, 2 as Ukrainian, 2 as Rusyn, 2 as Other, 1 as Serbian, 1 as Austrian, 1 as German, 1 as Croatian and 1 as English.

Note on population: The difference values of population numbers in the table "Population statistic" and in the sections "Ethnicity" & "Religion" is caused by the use of various statistical methods.

=== Religion ===
Census 2021 (1+ %)
Religion	Number	Fraction
None	467	41.81%
Roman Catholic Church	294	26.32%
Evangelical Church	262	23.46%
Seventh-day Adventist Church	31	2.78%
Not found out	25	2.24%
Total	1117	

In year 2021 was 1117 people by religion 467 from None, 294 from Roman Catholic Church, 262 from Evangelical Church, 31 from Seventh-day Adventist Church, 25 from Not found out, 10 from Baptists Church, 6 from Other and not ascertained christian church, 6 from Greek Catholic Church, 5 from Jehovah's Witnesses, 5 from Ad hoc movements, 3 from United Methodist Church, 1 from Eastern Orthodox Church, 1 from Other and 1 from Church of the Brethren.
