= Riečka, Banská Bystrica District =

Riečka Récske
- Municipality
- Flag

- Location of Riečka in the Banská Bystrica Region Location of Riečka in Slovakia
- Coordinates: 48°45′30″N 19°04′50″E
- Country: Slovakia
- Region: Banská Bystrica Region
- District: Banská Bystrica District
- First mentioned: 1455

Area
  - Total: 6.82 km^{2} (2.63 sq mi)
- Elevation: 478 m (1,568 ft)

Population (2025)
  - Total: 866
- Time zone: UTC+1 (CET)
  - Summer (DST): UTC+2 (CEST)
- Postal code: 974 01
- Area code: +421 48
- Vehicle registration plate (until 2022): BB
- Website: www.riecka.sk

Riečka (Hungarian: Récske) is a village and municipality in Banská Bystrica District in the Banská Bystrica Region of central Slovakia.

== History ==
In historical records the village was first mentioned in 1455.

== Geography ==
The municipality lies at an altitude of 478 metres (1,568 ft) and covers an area of 6.82 km^{2} (2.63 sq mi) (2025).

== Population ==
Population statistic (10 years)
Year	1995	2005	2015	2025
Count	520	625	779	866
Difference		+20.19%	+24.64%	+11.16%

Population statistic
Year	2024	2025
Count	868	866
Difference		−0.23%

It has a population of 866 people (31 December 2025).

=== Ethnicity ===
Census 2021 (1+ %)
Ethnicity	Number	Fraction
Slovak	822	98.79%
Other	10	1.2%
Total	832	

In year 2021 was 832 people by ethnicity 822 as Slovak, 10 as Other, 7 as Not found out, 6 as Hungarian, 5 as Czech, 2 as Moravian, 1 as Rusyn, 1 as Polish, 1 as Canadian, 1 as Greek and 1 as English.

Note on population: The difference values of population numbers in the table "Population statistic" and in the sections "Ethnicity" & "Religion" is caused by the use of various statistical methods.

=== Religion ===
Census 2021 (1+ %)
Religion	Number	Fraction
Roman Catholic Church	461	55.41%
None	236	28.37%
Evangelical Church	91	10.94%
Other and not ascertained christian church	9	1.08%
Greek Catholic Church	9	1.08%
Total	832	

In year 2021 was 832 people by religion 461 from Roman Catholic Church, 236 from None, 91 from Evangelical Church, 9 from Other and not ascertained christian church, 9 from Greek Catholic Church, 6 from Not found out, 6 from Other, 4 from Church of the Brethren, 4 from Buddhism, 2 from Islam, 2 from Ad hoc movements, 1 from Calvinist Church and 1 from Christian Congregations in Slovakia.
