= Motyčky =

Motyčky Martalja
- Municipality
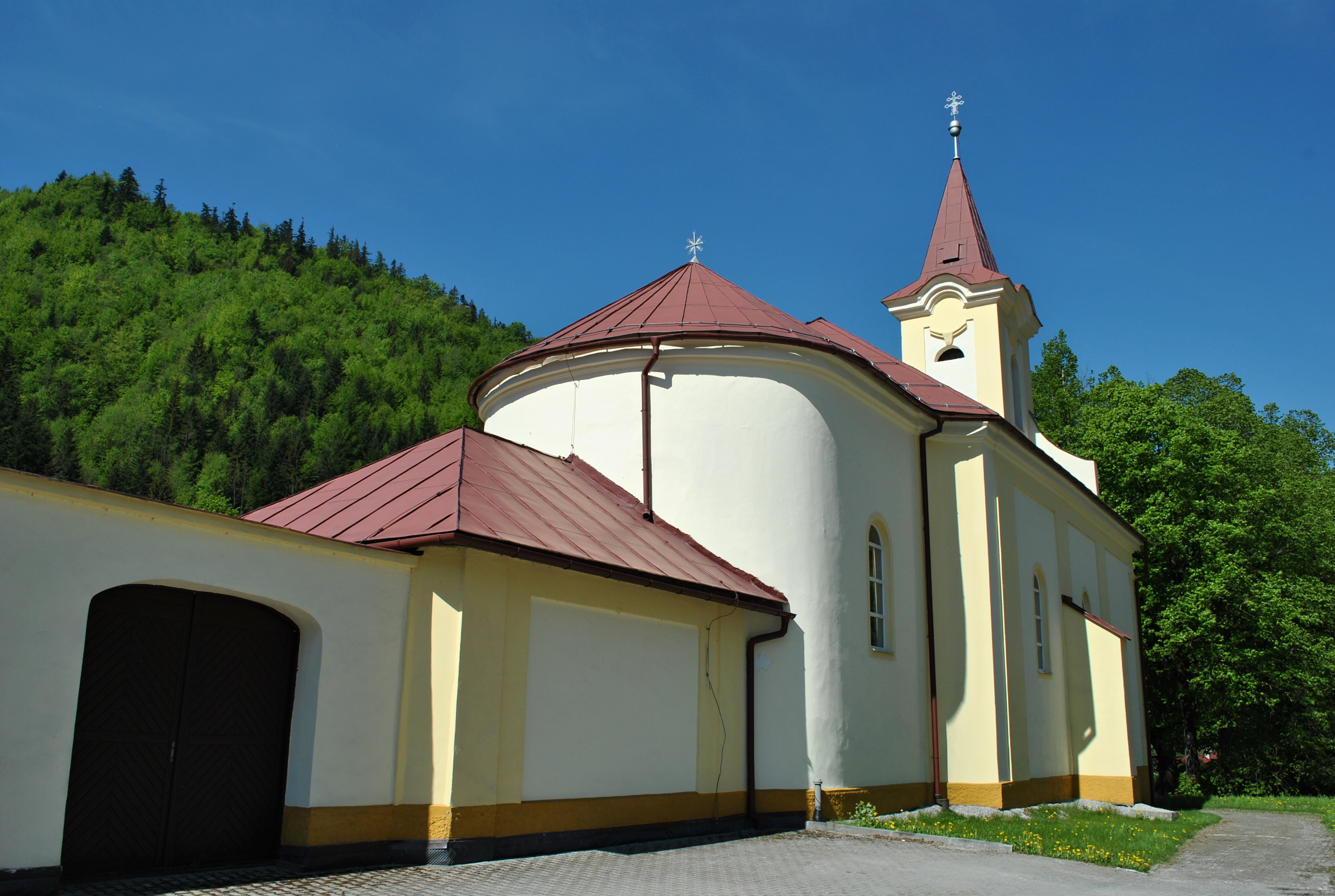
- Catholic church in Motyčky

- Flag

- Location of Motyčky in the Banská Bystrica Region Location of Motyčky in Slovakia
- Coordinates: 48.87°N 19.17°E
- Country: Slovakia
- Region: Banská Bystrica Region
- District: Banská Bystrica District
- First mentioned: 1743

Area
  - Total: 13.08 km^{2} (5.05 sq mi)
- Elevation: 690 m (2,260 ft)

Population (2025)
  - Total: 105
- Time zone: UTC+1 (CET)
  - Summer (DST): UTC+2 (CEST)
- Postal code: 976 02
- Area code: +421 48
- Vehicle registration plate (until 2022): BB
- Website: www.motycky.sk

Motyčky (Hungarian: Martalja) is a village and municipality in Banská Bystrica District in the Banská Bystrica Region of central Slovakia.

== History ==
In historical records the village was first mentioned in 1743.

== Geography ==
The municipality lies at an altitude of 690 metres (2,260 ft) and covers an area of 13.08 km^{2} (5.05 sq mi) (2025).

== Population ==
Population statistic (10 years)
Year	1995	2005	2015	2025
Count	103	97	107	105
Difference		−5.82%	+10.30%	−1.86%

Population statistic
Year	2024	2025
Count	104	105
Difference		+0.96%

It has a population of 105 people (31 December 2025).

=== Ethnicity ===
Census 2021 (1+ %)
Ethnicity	Number	Fraction
Slovak	102	97.14%
Total	105	

In year 2021 was 105 people by ethnicity 102 as Slovak, 1 as Not found out, 1 as Moravian and 1 as English.

Note on population: The difference values of population numbers in the table "Population statistic" and in the sections "Ethnicity" & "Religion" is caused by the use of various statistical methods.

=== Religion ===
Census 2021 (1+ %)
Religion	Number	Fraction
Roman Catholic Church	77	73.33%
None	22	20.95%
Evangelical Church	4	3.81%
Not found out	2	1.9%
Total	105	

In year 2021 was 105 people by religion 77 from Roman Catholic Church, 22 from None, 4 from Evangelical Church and 2 from Not found out.
