= Kordíky =

Kordíky Kordéháza
- Municipality
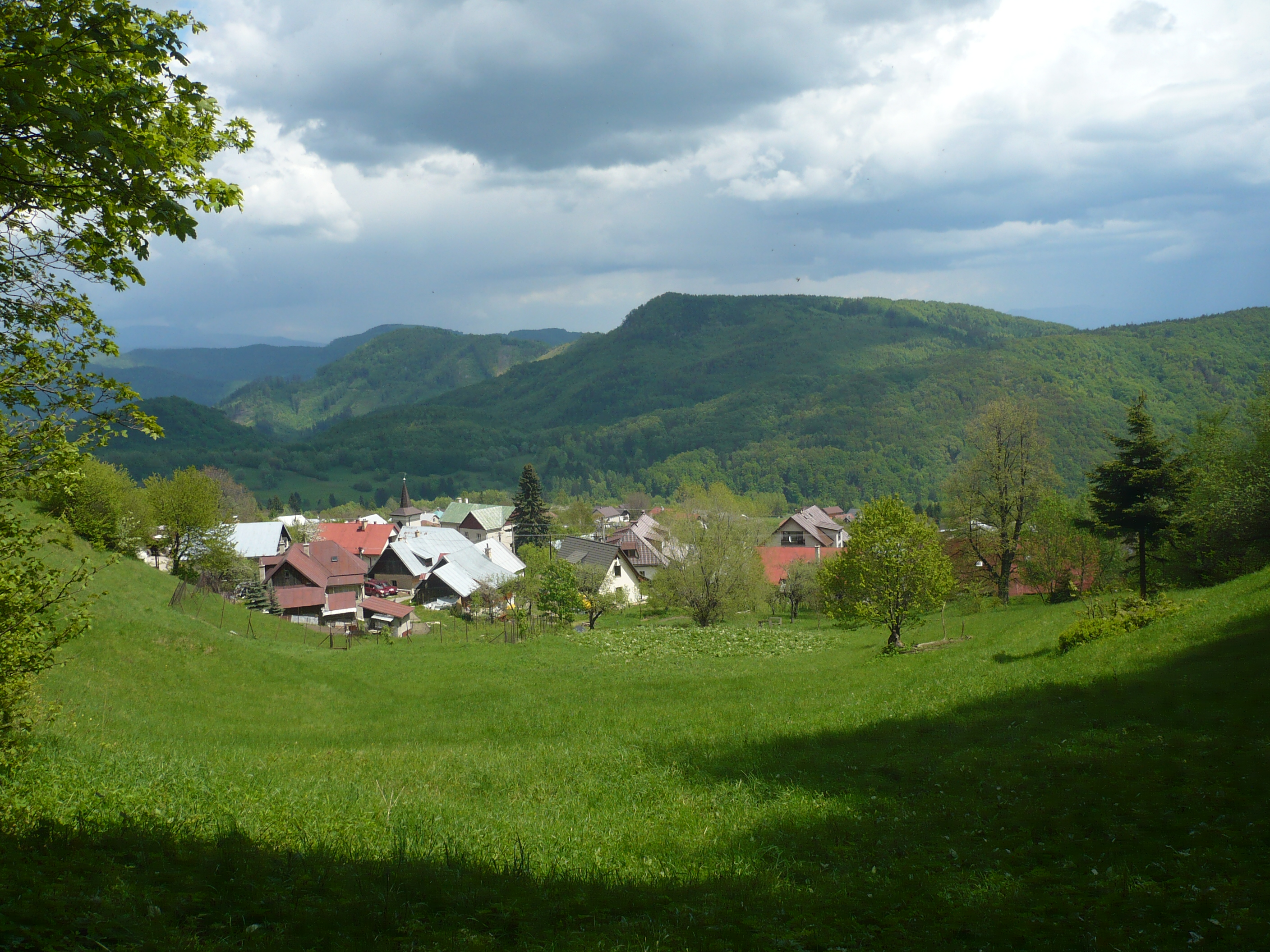

- Flag

- Location of Kordíky in the Banská Bystrica Region Location of Kordíky in Slovakia
- Coordinates: 48.77°N 19.03°E
- Country: Slovakia
- Region: Banská Bystrica Region
- District: Banská Bystrica District
- First mentioned: 1690

Government
  - Mayor: Dušan Tuček (Independent)

Area
  - Total: 9.97 km^{2} (3.85 sq mi)
- Elevation: 848 m (2,782 ft)

Population (2025)
  - Total: 510
- Time zone: UTC+1 (CET)
  - Summer (DST): UTC+2 (CEST)
- Postal code: 976 34
- Area code: +421 48
- Vehicle registration plate (until 2022): BB
- Website: www.obeckordiky.sk

Kordíky (Hungarian: Kordéháza) is a village and municipality in Banská Bystrica District in the Banská Bystrica Region of central Slovakia.

== History ==
In historical records the village was first mentioned in 1690.

== Geography ==
The municipality lies at an altitude of 848 metres (2,782 ft) and covers an area of 9.97 km^{2} (3.85 sq mi) (2025).

== Population ==
Population statistic (10 years)
Year	1995	2005	2015	2025
Count	209	297	416	510
Difference		+42.10%	+40.06%	+22.59%

Population statistic
Year	2024	2025
Count	492	510
Difference		+3.65%

It has a population of 510 people (31 December 2025).

=== Ethnicity ===
Census 2021 (1+ %)
Ethnicity	Number	Fraction
Slovak	468	98.11%
Czech	6	1.25%
Total	477	

In year 2021 was 477 people by ethnicity 468 as Slovak, 6 as Czech, 3 as Hungarian, 3 as Other, 2 as Russian, 2 as Not found out, 2 as German and 1 as Chinese.

Note on population: The difference values of population numbers in the table "Population statistic" and in the sections "Ethnicity" & "Religion" is caused by the use of various statistical methods.

=== Religion ===
Census 2021 (1+ %)
Religion	Number	Fraction
Roman Catholic Church	269	56.39%
None	174	36.48%
Evangelical Church	21	4.4%
Total	477	

In year 2021 was 477 people by religion 269 from Roman Catholic Church, 174 from None, 21 from Evangelical Church, 3 from Greek Catholic Church, 2 from Other and not ascertained christian church, 2 from Christian Congregations in Slovakia, 2 from United Methodist Church, 1 from Not found out, 1 from Other, 1 from Buddhism and 1 from Ad hoc movements.
