= Povrazník =

Povrazník Póráz
- Municipality
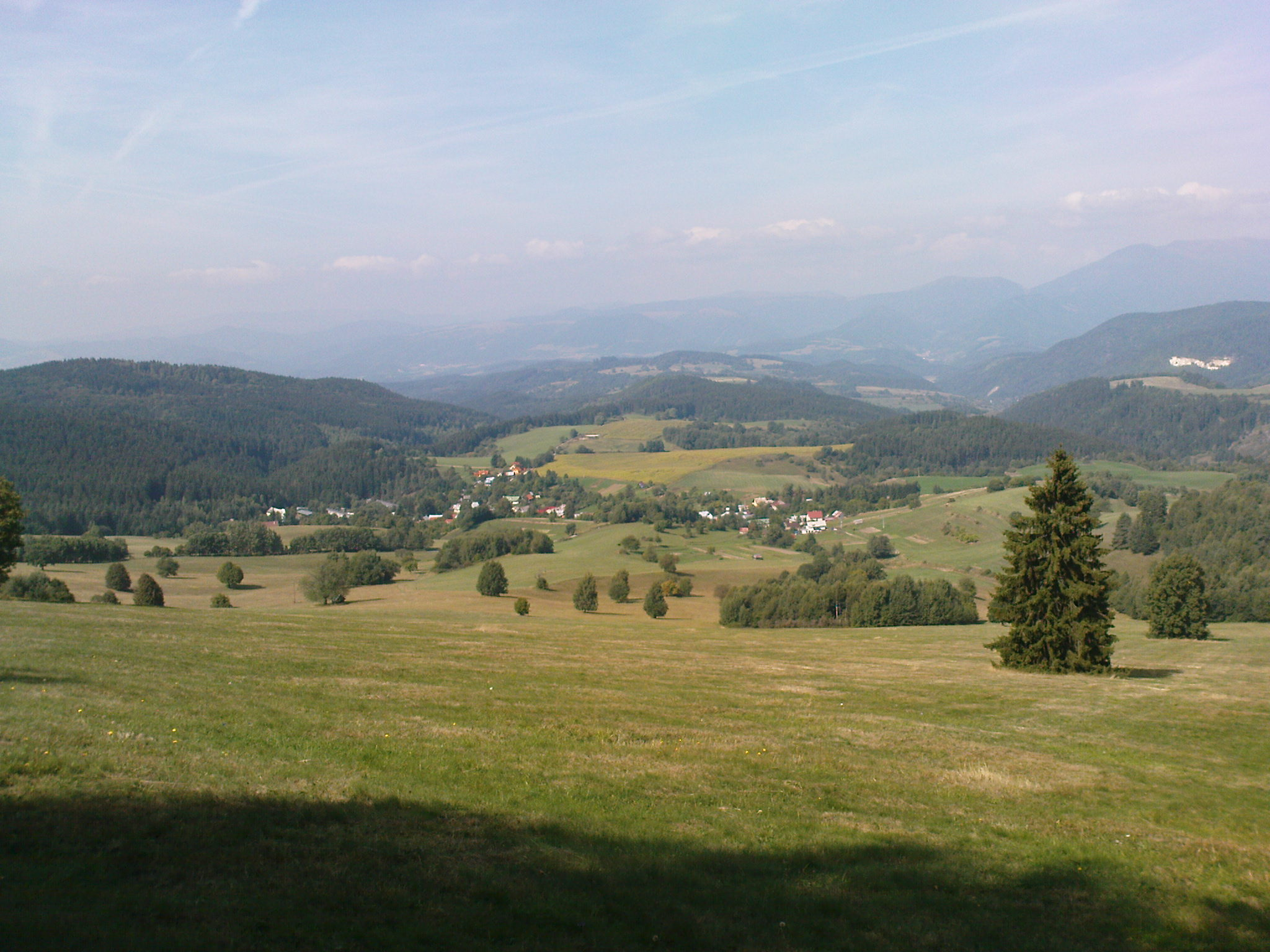

- Flag

- Location of Povrazník in the Banská Bystrica Region Location of Povrazník in Slovakia
- Coordinates: 48.72°N 19.37°E
- Country: Slovakia
- Region: Banská Bystrica Region
- District: Banská Bystrica District
- First mentioned: 1424

Area
  - Total: 3.34 km^{2} (1.29 sq mi)
- Elevation: 644 m (2,113 ft)

Population (2025)
  - Total: 146
- Time zone: UTC+1 (CET)
  - Summer (DST): UTC+2 (CEST)
- Postal code: 976 55
- Area code: +421 48
- Vehicle registration plate (until 2022): BB
- Website: www.povraznik.sk/sk/

Povrazník (Hungarian: Póráz, German: Sailersdorf) is a village and municipality in Banská Bystrica District in the Banská Bystrica Region of central Slovakia.

== History ==
The village was first mentioned in historical records in 1424.

== Geography ==
The municipality lies at an altitude of 644 metres (2,113 ft) and covers an area of 3.34 km^{2} (1.29 sq mi) (2025).

== Population ==
Population statistic (10 years)
Year	1995	2005	2015	2025
Count	150	145	138	146
Difference		−3.33%	−4.82%	+5.79%

Population statistic
Year	2024	2025
Count	142	146
Difference		+2.81%

It has a population of 146 people (31 December 2025).

=== Ethnicity ===
Census 2021 (1+ %)
Ethnicity	Number	Fraction
Slovak	130	90.9%
Not found out	13	9.09%
Total	143	

In year 2021 was 143 people by ethnicity 130 as Slovak, 13 as Not found out and 1 as Rusyn.

Note on population: The difference values of population numbers in the table "Population statistic" and in the sections "Ethnicity" & "Religion" is caused by the use of various statistical methods.

=== Religion ===
Census 2021 (1+ %)
Religion	Number	Fraction
Evangelical Church	89	62.24%
None	22	15.38%
Not found out	16	11.19%
Roman Catholic Church	15	10.49%
Total	143	

In year 2021 was 143 people by religion 89 from Evangelical Church, 22 from None, 16 from Not found out, 15 from Roman Catholic Church and 1 from Church of the Brethren.
