= Strelníky =

Strelníky Sebő
- Municipality
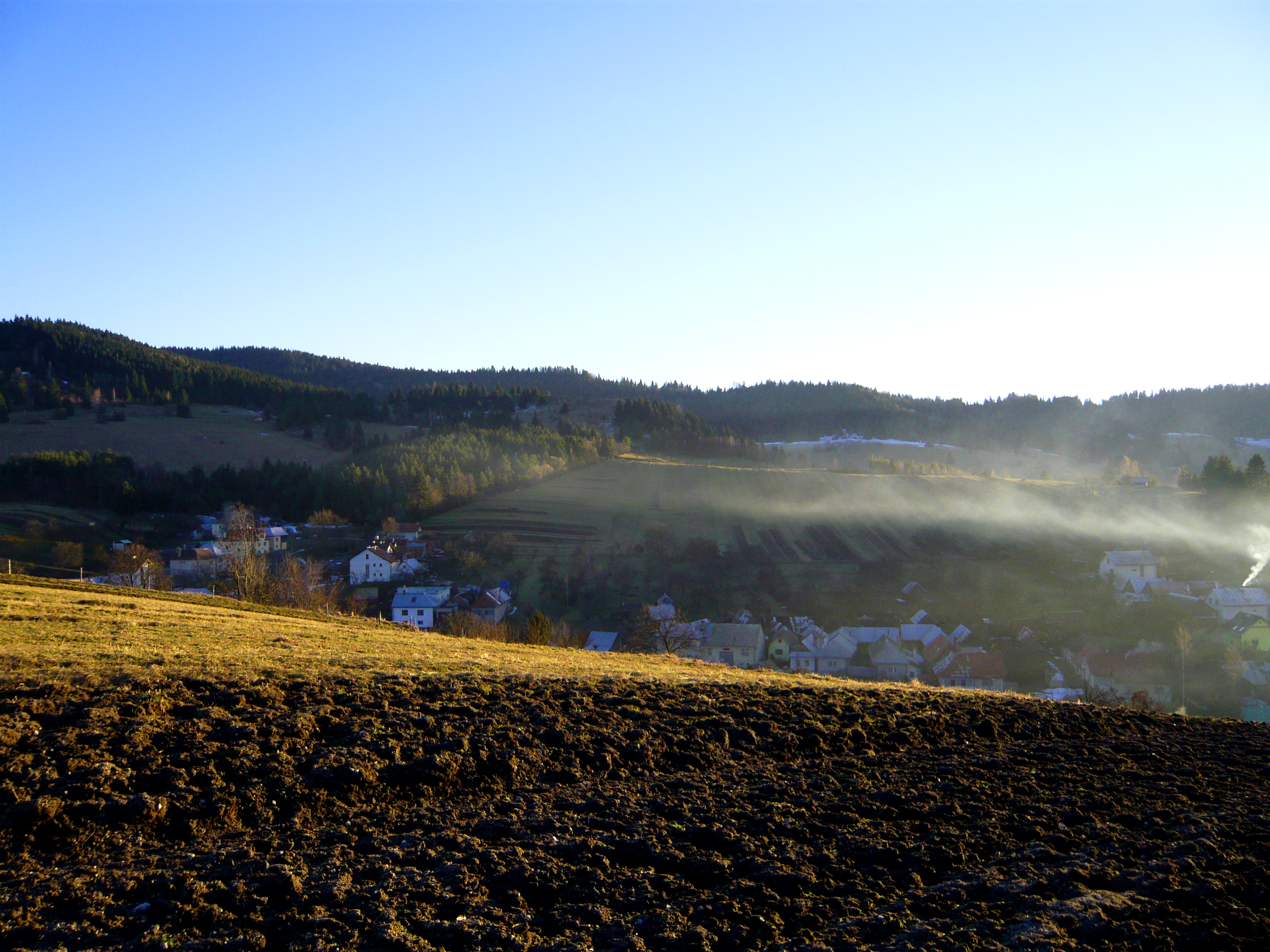

- Flag

- Location of Strelníky in the Banská Bystrica Region Location of Strelníky in Slovakia
- Coordinates: 48.72°N 19.40°E
- Country: Slovakia
- Region: Banská Bystrica Region
- District: Banská Bystrica District
- First mentioned: 1465

Area
  - Total: 17.46 km^{2} (6.74 sq mi)
- Elevation: 655 m (2,149 ft)

Population (2025)
  - Total: 746
- Time zone: UTC+1 (CET)
  - Summer (DST): UTC+2 (CEST)
- Postal code: 976 55
- Area code: +421 48
- Vehicle registration plate (until 2022): BB
- Website: www.strelniky.sk

Strelníky (Hungarian: Sebő, German: Scheibe) is a village and municipality in Banská Bystrica District in the Banská Bystrica Region of central Slovakia.

== History ==
In historical records the village was first mentioned in 1465.

== Geography ==
The municipality lies at an altitude of 655 metres (2,149 ft) and covers an area of 17.46 km^{2} (6.74 sq mi) (2025).

== Population ==
Population statistic (10 years)
Year	1995	2005	2015	2025
Count	849	808	779	746
Difference		−4.82%	−3.58%	−4.23%

Population statistic
Year	2024	2025
Count	740	746
Difference		+0.81%

It has a population of 746 people (31 December 2025).

=== Ethnicity ===
Census 2021 (1+ %)
Ethnicity	Number	Fraction
Slovak	761	98.83%
Not found out	11	1.42%
Total	770	

In year 2021 was 770 people by ethnicity 761 as Slovak, 11 as Not found out, 2 as Rusyn, 2 as Hungarian, 2 as Other and 1 as Czech.

Note on population: The difference values of population numbers in the table "Population statistic" and in the sections "Ethnicity" & "Religion" is caused by the use of various statistical methods.

=== Religion ===
Census 2021 (1+ %)
Religion	Number	Fraction
Evangelical Church	562	72.99%
None	114	14.81%
Roman Catholic Church	71	9.22%
Ad hoc movements	8	1.04%
Total	770	

In year 2021 was 770 people by religion 562 from Evangelical Church, 114 from None, 71 from Roman Catholic Church, 8 from Ad hoc movements, 5 from Not found out, 4 from Greek Catholic Church, 3 from Baptists Church, 1 from Other and not ascertained christian church, 1 from Other and 1 from Church of the Brethren.
