= Čerín =

Čerín Cserény
- Municipality
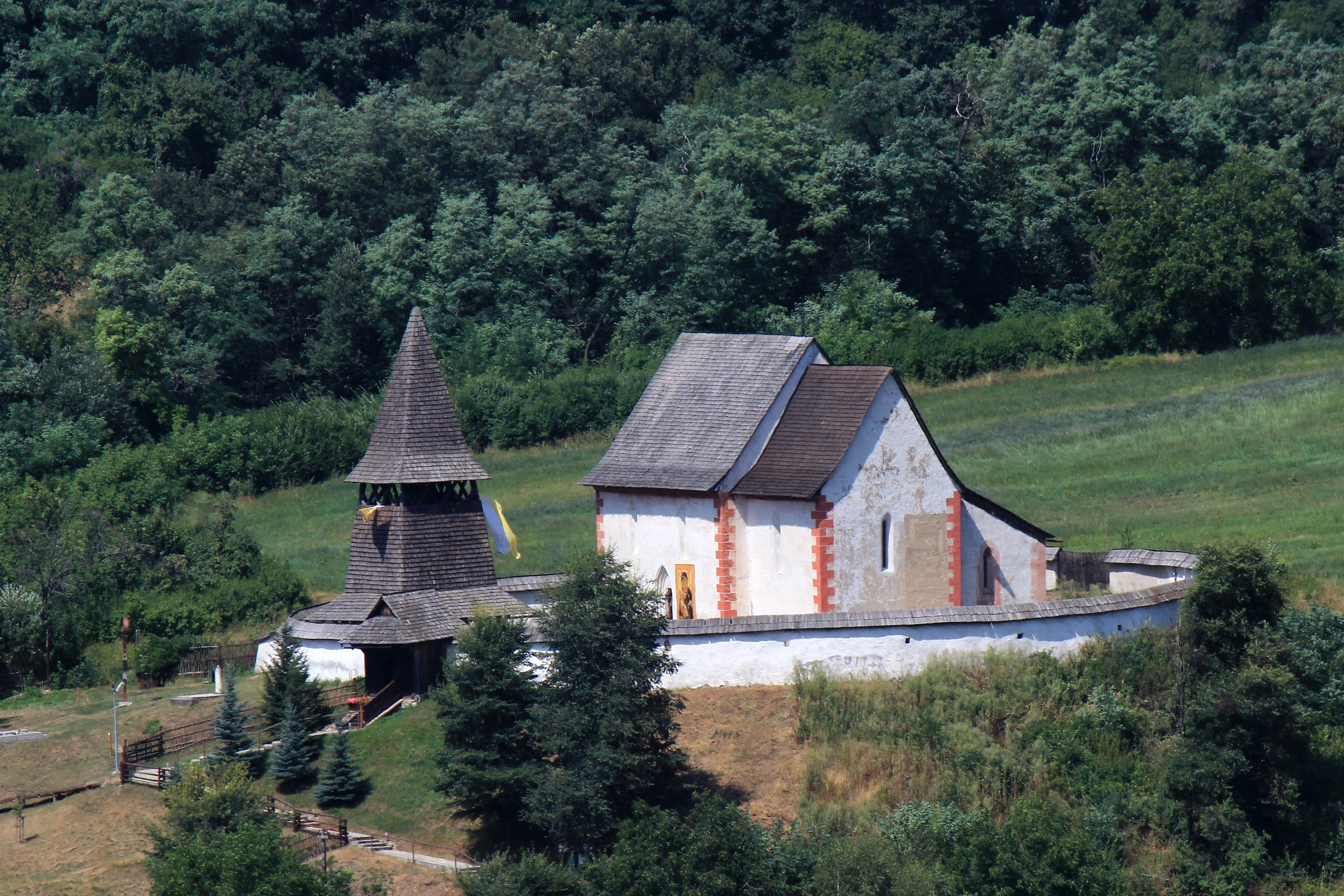
- Church of St. Martin in Čerín

- Flag

- Location of Čerín in the Banská Bystrica Region Location of Čerín in Slovakia
- Coordinates: 48.67°N 19.25°E
- Country: Slovakia
- Region: Banská Bystrica Region
- District: Banská Bystrica District
- First mentioned: 1300

Government
  - Mayor: Pavel Kmeť

Area
  - Total: 11.53 km^{2} (4.45 sq mi)
- Elevation: 395 m (1,296 ft)

Population (2025)
  - Total: 438
- Time zone: UTC+1 (CET)
  - Summer (DST): UTC+2 (CEST)
- Postal code: 974 01
- Area code: +421 48
- Vehicle registration plate (until 2022): BB
- Website: www.cerin.sk

Čerín (German: Fanischhain; Hungarian: Cserény) is a village and municipality of the Banská Bystrica District in the Banská Bystrica Region of central Slovakia.

== History ==
In historical records, the village was first mentioned in 1300 (as Cheren), when it belonged to a certain Paul, brother of Demeter, count of Zvolen. The village later belonged to the town of Zvolen and to the castle of Vígľaš. In the 16th century, it had to pay tributes to the Ottoman Empire.

== Geography ==
The municipality lies at an altitude of 395 metres (1,296 ft) and covers an area of 11.53 km^{2} (4.45 sq mi) (2025).

== Population ==
Population statistic (10 years)
Year	1995	2005	2015	2025
Count	399	441	446	438
Difference		+10.52%	+1.13%	−1.79%

Population statistic
Year	2024	2025
Count	446	438
Difference		−1.79%

It has a population of 438 people (31 December 2025).

=== Ethnicity ===
Census 2021 (1+ %)
Ethnicity	Number	Fraction
Slovak	434	96.44%
Not found out	18	4%
Romani	7	1.55%
Total	450	

In year 2021 was 450 people by ethnicity 434 as Slovak, 18 as Not found out, 7 as Romani and 2 as Czech.

Note on population: The difference values of population numbers in the table "Population statistic" and in the sections "Ethnicity" & "Religion" is caused by the use of various statistical methods.

=== Religion ===
Census 2021 (1+ %)
Religion	Number	Fraction
Evangelical Church	177	39.33%
Roman Catholic Church	116	25.78%
None	114	25.33%
Not found out	21	4.67%
Baptists Church	6	1.33%
Other and not ascertained christian church	5	1.11%
Greek Catholic Church	5	1.11%
Total	450	

In year 2021 was 450 people by religion 177 from Evangelical Church, 116 from Roman Catholic Church, 114 from None, 21 from Not found out, 6 from Baptists Church, 5 from Other and not ascertained christian church, 5 from Greek Catholic Church, 4 from Other, 1 from Church of the Brethren and 1 from Buddhism.

== Old Gothic Church ==
Established in 1315 is located on lightly fortified area on the higher ground above the village. According to chronicles, it was the Paul from Veľký Krtíš that decreed its build. The wooden bell tower comes from 17th century. The wooden ceiling of the church is decorated by tiles with colorful geometric shapes which makes it unusual and extraordinary among other Christian churches. Its oldest decoration comes from the 14th century and beside traditional Christian thematics it is decorated also by a wooden balcony which is in recent years being reconstructed, mainly the harpsichord organ. The altar is of Barok style and comes from 1744. The former altar made by a carpenter from Kremnica that comes from year 1483 was transferred to Budapest.
