= Selce, Banská Bystrica District =

Selce Szelcse
- Municipality
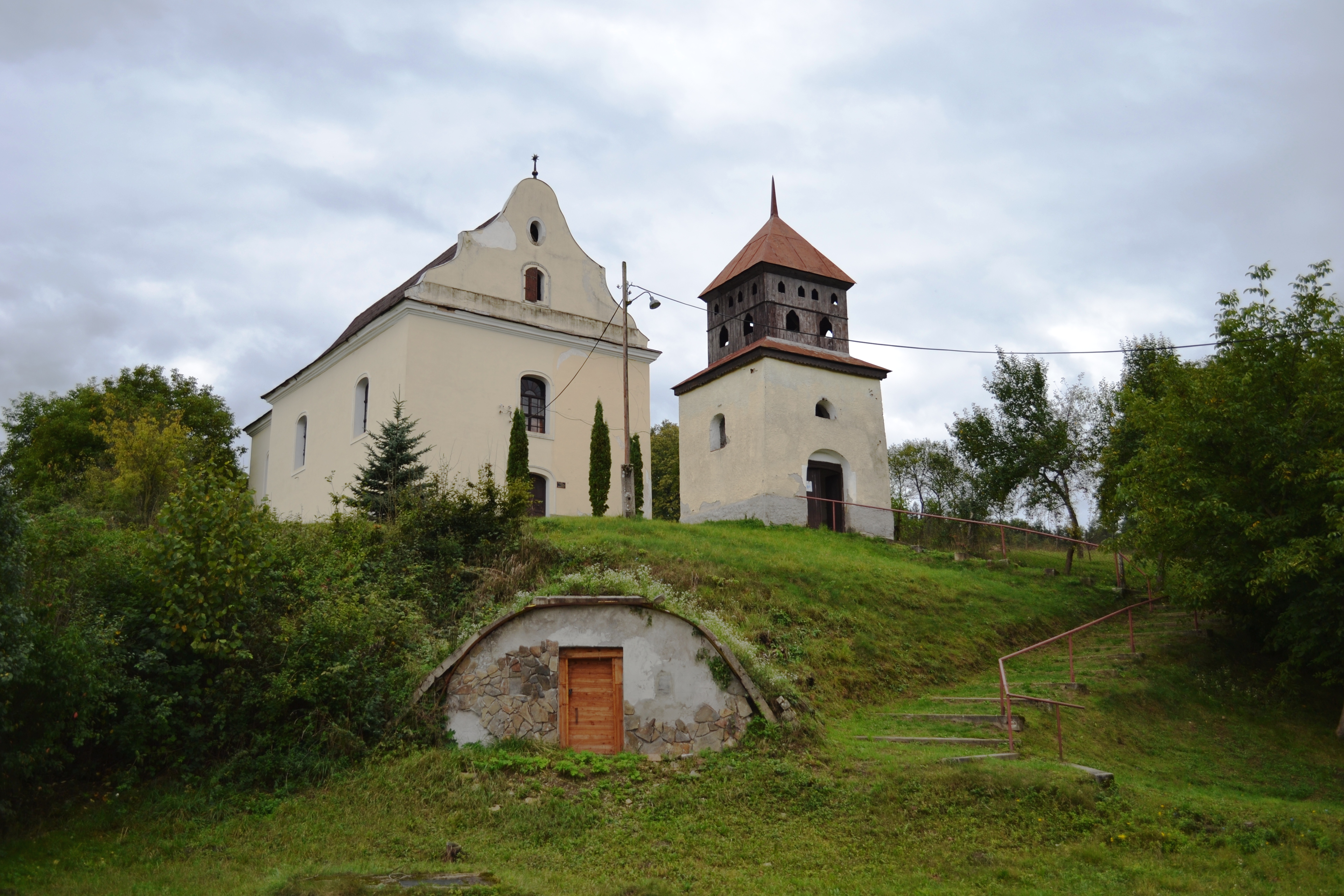

- Flag

- Location of Selce in the Banská Bystrica Region Location of Selce in Slovakia
- Coordinates: 48°45′30″N 19°12′20″E
- Country: Slovakia
- Region: Banská Bystrica Region
- District: Banská Bystrica District
- First mentioned: 1332

Area
  - Total: 19.99 km^{2} (7.72 sq mi)
- Elevation: 424 m (1,391 ft)

Population (2025)
  - Total: 2,089
- Time zone: UTC+1 (CET)
  - Summer (DST): UTC+2 (CEST)
- Postal code: 976 11
- Area code: +421 48
- Vehicle registration plate (until 2022): BB
- Website: www.selce.sk

Selce (Hungarian: Szelcse) is a village and municipality in Banská Bystrica District in the Banská Bystrica Region of central Slovakia.

== History ==
In historical records the village was first mentioned in 1332.

== Geography ==
The municipality lies at an altitude of 424 metres (1,391 ft) and covers an area of 19.99 km^{2} (7.72 sq mi) (2025).

== Population ==
Population statistic (10 years)
Year	1995	2005	2015	2025
Count	2000	2056	2154	2089
Difference		+2.8%	+4.76%	−3.01%

Population statistic
Year	2024	2025
Count	2100	2089
Difference		−0.52%

It has a population of 2089 people (31 December 2025).

=== Ethnicity ===
Census 2021 (1+ %)
Ethnicity	Number	Fraction
Slovak	2085	98.11%
Not found out	25	1.17%
Total	2125	

In year 2021 was 2125 people by ethnicity 2085 as Slovak, 25 as Not found out, 11 as Czech, 6 as Hungarian, 5 as Russian, 3 as Other, 2 as Ukrainian, 2 as German, 1 as Jewish, 1 as Rusyn, 1 as Polish, 1 as Moravian, 1 as Bulgarian and 1 as Albanian.

Note on population: The difference values of population numbers in the table "Population statistic" and in the sections "Ethnicity" & "Religion" is caused by the use of various statistical methods.

=== Religion ===
Census 2021 (1+ %)
Religion	Number	Fraction
Roman Catholic Church	1459	68.66%
None	432	20.33%
Evangelical Church	124	5.84%
Not found out	25	1.18%
Greek Catholic Church	23	1.08%
Total	2125	

In year 2021 was 2125 people by religion 1459 from Roman Catholic Church, 432 from None, 124 from Evangelical Church, 25 from Not found out, 23 from Greek Catholic Church, 11 from Seventh-day Adventist Church, 11 from Ad hoc movements, 9 from Church of the Brethren, 7 from Jehovah's Witnesses, 4 from Other, 3 from Other and not ascertained christian church, 3 from Islam, 2 from Calvinist Church, 2 from Eastern Orthodox Church, 2 from Christian Congregations in Slovakia, 2 from Bahá'i Community, 1 from Jewish community, 1 from Old Catholic Church, 1 from Paganism and natural spirituality, 1 from United Methodist Church, 1 from Baptists Church and 1 from Apostolic Church.
