= Lučatín =

Lučatín Lucatő
- Municipality
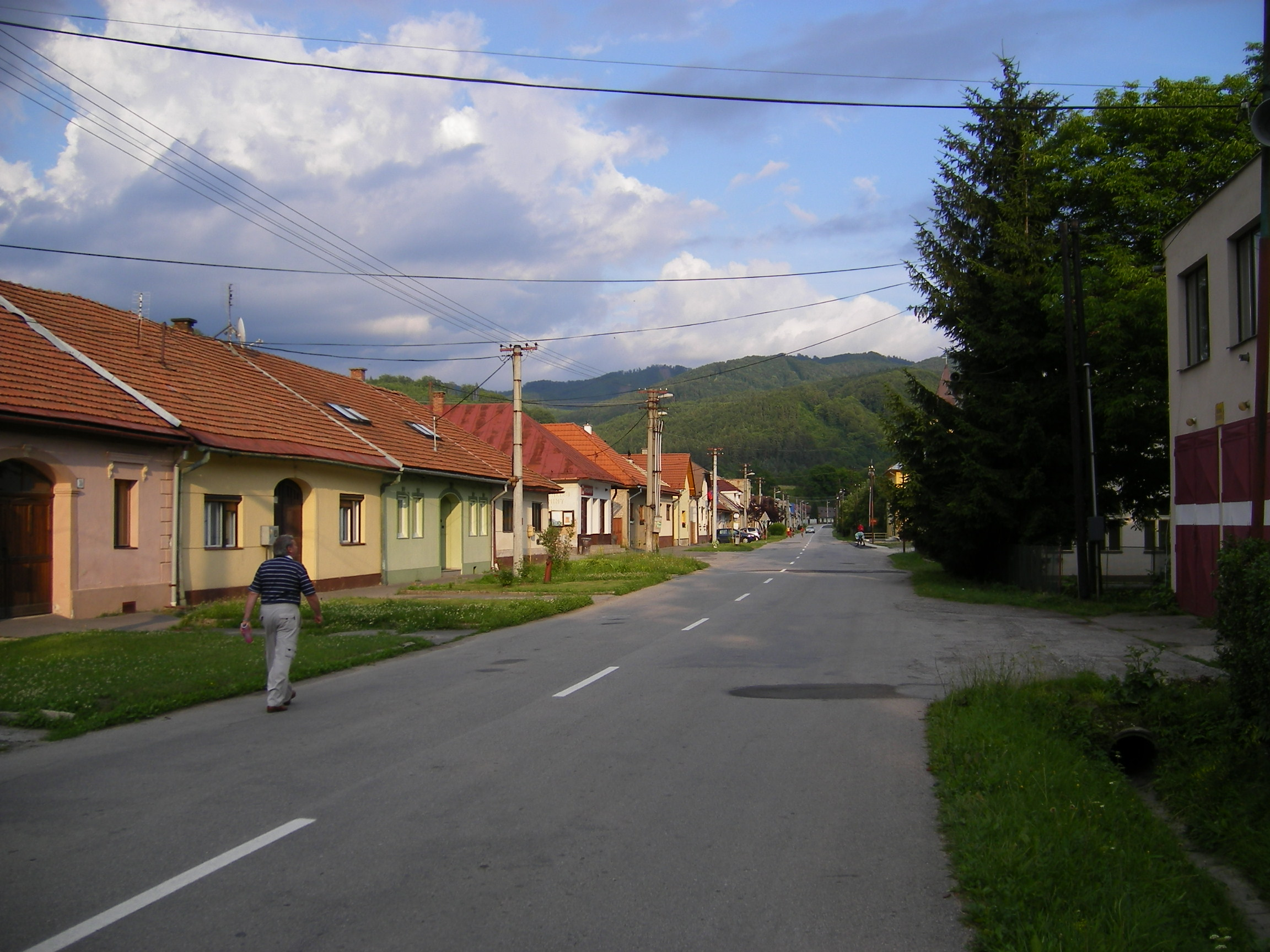

- Flag

- Location of Lučatín in the Banská Bystrica Region Location of Lučatín in Slovakia
- Coordinates: 48.78°N 19.33°E
- Country: Slovakia
- Region: Banská Bystrica Region
- District: Banská Bystrica District
- First mentioned: 1424

Area
  - Total: 10.88 km^{2} (4.20 sq mi)
- Elevation: 386 m (1,266 ft)

Population (2025)
  - Total: 666
- Time zone: UTC+1 (CET)
  - Summer (DST): UTC+2 (CEST)
- Postal code: 976 61
- Area code: +421 48
- Vehicle registration plate (until 2022): BB
- Website: www.lucatin.eu

Lučatín (Hungarian: Lucatő) is a village and municipality in Banská Bystrica District in the Banská Bystrica Region of central Slovakia.

== History ==
In historical records the village was first mentioned in 1424.

== Geography ==
The municipality lies at an altitude of 386 metres (1,266 ft) and covers an area of 10.88 km^{2} (4.20 sq mi) (2025).

== Population ==
Population statistic (10 years)
Year	1995	2005	2015	2025
Count	509	623	649	666
Difference		+22.39%	+4.17%	+2.61%

Population statistic
Year	2024	2025
Count	672	666
Difference		−0.89%

It has a population of 666 people (31 December 2025).

=== Ethnicity ===
Census 2021 (1+ %)
Ethnicity	Number	Fraction
Slovak	660	98.36%
Not found out	7	1.04%
Total	671	

In year 2021 was 671 people by ethnicity 660 as Slovak, 7 as Not found out, 5 as Other, 3 as Czech, 2 as Irish, 2 as Romani, 1 as Italian, 1 as Russian, 1 as German, 1 as Moravian, 1 as Hungarian and 1 as English.

Note on population: The difference values of population numbers in the table "Population statistic" and in the sections "Ethnicity" & "Religion" is caused by the use of various statistical methods.

=== Religion ===
Census 2021 (1+ %)
Religion	Number	Fraction
Roman Catholic Church	290	43.22%
None	211	31.45%
Evangelical Church	132	19.67%
Not found out	15	2.24%
Greek Catholic Church	11	1.64%
Total	671	

In year 2021 was 671 people by religion 290 from Roman Catholic Church, 211 from None, 132 from Evangelical Church, 15 from Not found out, 11 from Greek Catholic Church, 3 from Paganism and natural spirituality, 3 from Jehovah's Witnesses, 3 from Ad hoc movements, 2 from Other and 1 from United Methodist Church.
