= Nemce =

Nemce Zólyomnémeti
- Municipality
- Flag

- Location of Nemce in the Banská Bystrica Region Location of Nemce in Slovakia
- Coordinates: 48.76°N 19.19°E
- Country: Slovakia
- Region: Banská Bystrica Region
- District: Banská Bystrica District
- First mentioned: 1473

Area
  - Total: 4.10 km^{2} (1.58 sq mi)
- Elevation: 410 m (1,350 ft)

Population (2025)
  - Total: 1,129
- Time zone: UTC+1 (CET)
  - Summer (DST): UTC+2 (CEST)
- Postal code: 974 01
- Area code: +421 48
- Vehicle registration plate (until 2022): BB
- Website: www.nemce.sk

Nemce (Hungarian: Zólyomnémeti) is a village and municipality in Banská Bystrica District in the Banská Bystrica Region of central Slovakia.

== History ==
In historical records the village was first mentioned in 1473.

== Geography ==
The municipality lies at an altitude of 410 metres (1,350 ft) and covers an area of 4.10 km^{2} (1.58 sq mi) (2025).

== Population ==
Population statistic (10 years)
Year	1995	2005	2015	2025
Count	1093	1121	1187	1129
Difference		+2.56%	+5.88%	−4.88%

Population statistic
Year	2024	2025
Count	1153	1129
Difference		−2.08%

It has a population of 1129 people (31 December 2025).

=== Ethnicity ===
Census 2021 (1+ %)
Ethnicity	Number	Fraction
Slovak	1095	95.88%
Not found out	38	3.32%
Total	1142	

In year 2021 was 1142 people by ethnicity 1095 as Slovak, 38 as Not found out, 7 as Other, 5 as Czech, 5 as Romani, 4 as Irish, 2 as Russian, 2 as Hungarian, 2 as English, 1 as Rusyn and 1 as German.

Note on population: The difference values of population numbers in the table "Population statistic" and in the sections "Ethnicity" & "Religion" is caused by the use of various statistical methods.

=== Religion ===
Census 2021 (1+ %)
Religion	Number	Fraction
None	463	40.54%
Roman Catholic Church	365	31.96%
Evangelical Church	233	20.4%
Not found out	49	4.29%
Total	1142	

In year 2021 was 1142 people by religion 463 from None, 365 from Roman Catholic Church, 233 from Evangelical Church, 49 from Not found out, 4 from Jehovah's Witnesses, 4 from Christian Congregations in Slovakia, 4 from Greek Catholic Church, 4 from United Methodist Church, 4 from Ad hoc movements, 3 from Paganism and natural spirituality, 3 from Other and not ascertained christian church, 2 from Other, 2 from Seventh-day Adventist Church, 1 from Eastern Orthodox Church and 1 from Buddhism.
