= Moštenica =

Moštenica Mosód
- Municipality
- Flag

- Location of Moštenica in the Banská Bystrica Region Location of Moštenica in Slovakia
- Coordinates: 48.80°N 19.30°E
- Country: Slovakia
- Region: Banská Bystrica Region
- District: Banská Bystrica District
- First mentioned: 1340

Government
  - Mayor: Katarína Chabanová (Independent)

Area
  - Total: 13.42 km^{2} (5.18 sq mi)
- Elevation: 452 m (1,483 ft)

Population (2025)
  - Total: 250
- Time zone: UTC+1 (CET)
  - Summer (DST): UTC+2 (CEST)
- Postal code: 976 61
- Area code: +421 48
- Vehicle registration plate (until 2022): BB
- Website: mostenica.eu

Moštenica (Hungarian: Mosód) is a village and municipality in Banská Bystrica District in the Banská Bystrica Region of central Slovakia.

== History ==
In historical records the village was first mentioned in 1340. One of Jakob Fugger's smelting plants was located in the settlement.

== Geography ==
The municipality lies at an altitude of 452 metres (1,483 ft) and covers an area of 13.42 km^{2} (5.18 sq mi) (2025).

== Population ==
Population statistic (10 years)
Year	1995	2005	2015	2025
Count	158	202	222	250
Difference		+27.84%	+9.90%	+12.61%

Population statistic
Year	2024	2025
Count	241	250
Difference		+3.73%

It has a population of 250 people (31 December 2025).

=== Ethnicity ===
Census 2021 (1+ %)
Ethnicity	Number	Fraction
Slovak	221	94.84%
Not found out	10	4.29%
Hungarian	5	2.14%
Czech	3	1.28%
Total	233	

In year 2021 was 233 people by ethnicity 221 as Slovak, 10 as Not found out, 5 as Hungarian, 3 as Czech and 1 as Romani.

Note on population: The difference values of population numbers in the table "Population statistic" and in the sections "Ethnicity" & "Religion" is caused by the use of various statistical methods.

=== Religion ===
Census 2021 (1+ %)
Religion	Number	Fraction
Roman Catholic Church	120	51.5%
None	82	35.19%
Evangelical Church	16	6.87%
Not found out	9	3.86%
Total	233	

In year 2021 was 233 people by religion 120 from Roman Catholic Church, 82 from None, 16 from Evangelical Church, 9 from Not found out, 2 from Other, 2 from Greek Catholic Church, 1 from Buddhism and 1 from Ad hoc movements.
