= Kynceľová =

Kynceľová Göncölfalva
- Municipality
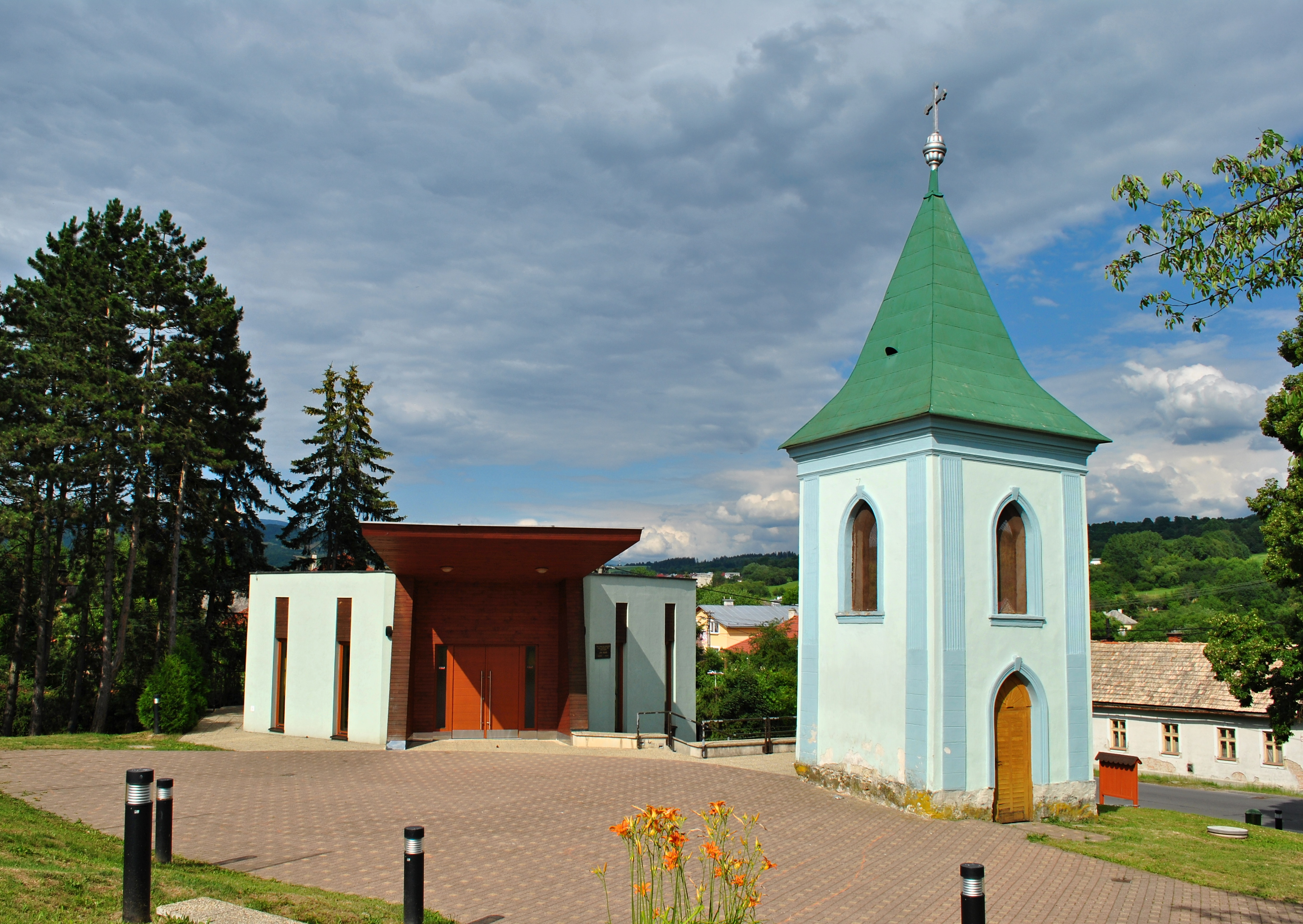

- Flag

- Location of Kynceľová in the Banská Bystrica Region Location of Kynceľová in Slovakia
- Coordinates: 48.75°N 19.17°E
- Country: Slovakia
- Region: Banská Bystrica Region
- District: Banská Bystrica District
- First mentioned: 1435

Area
  - Total: 1.16 km^{2} (0.45 sq mi)
- Elevation: 382 m (1,253 ft)

Population (2025)
  - Total: 394
- Time zone: UTC+1 (CET)
  - Summer (DST): UTC+2 (CEST)
- Postal code: 974 01
- Area code: +421 48
- Vehicle registration plate (until 2022): BB
- Website: www.kyncelova.sk

Kynceľová (Hungarian: Göncölfalva) is a village and municipality in Banská Bystrica District in the Banská Bystrica Region of central Slovakia.

== History ==
In historical records the village was first mentioned in 1435.

== Geography ==
The municipality lies at an altitude of 382 metres (1,253 ft) and covers an area of 1.16 km^{2} (0.45 sq mi) (2025).

== Population ==
Population statistic (10 years)
Year	1995	2005	2015	2025
Count	296	351	367	394
Difference		+18.58%	+4.55%	+7.35%

Population statistic
Year	2024	2025
Count	393	394
Difference		+0.25%

It has a population of 394 people (31 December 2025).

=== Ethnicity ===
Census 2021 (1+ %)
Ethnicity	Number	Fraction
Slovak	382	97.69%
Not found out	7	1.79%
Czech	4	1.02%
Romani	4	1.02%
Other	4	1.02%
Total	391	

In year 2021 was 391 people by ethnicity 382 as Slovak, 7 as Not found out, 4 as Czech, 4 as Romani, 4 as Other, 1 as Jewish, 1 as Ukrainian, 1 as Rusyn, 1 as Russian, 1 as Moravian and 1 as Hungarian.

Note on population: The difference values of population numbers in the table "Population statistic" and in the sections "Ethnicity" & "Religion" is caused by the use of various statistical methods.

=== Religion ===
Census 2021 (1+ %)
Religion	Number	Fraction
Roman Catholic Church	146	37.34%
None	140	35.81%
Evangelical Church	82	20.97%
Not found out	6	1.53%
Jehovah's Witnesses	5	1.28%
Total	391	

In year 2021 was 391 people by religion 146 from Roman Catholic Church, 140 from None, 82 from Evangelical Church, 6 from Not found out, 5 from Jehovah's Witnesses, 3 from Other, 3 from Greek Catholic Church, 2 from Ad hoc movements, 1 from Eastern Orthodox Church, 1 from Other and not ascertained christian church, 1 from Christian Congregations in Slovakia and 1 from Buddhism.
