= Brusno =

Brusno Borosznó
- Municipality
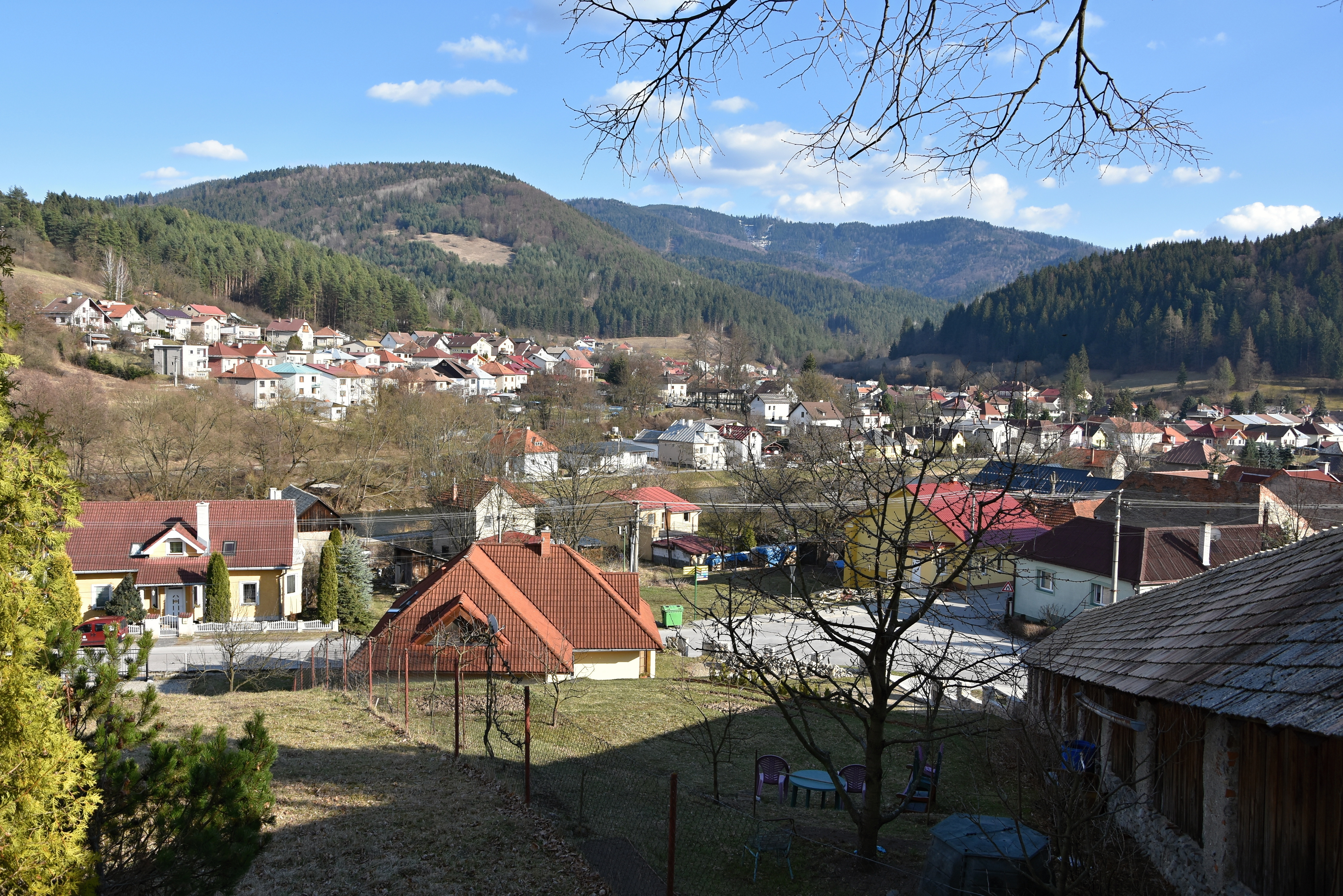
- View of Brusno from its church

- Flag

- Location of Brusno in the Banská Bystrica Region Location of Brusno in Slovakia
- Coordinates: 48.80°N 19.38°E
- Country: Slovakia
- Region: Banská Bystrica Region
- District: Banská Bystrica District
- First mentioned: 1424

Government
  - Mayor: Ing. Ivan Švec

Area
  - Total: 43.51 km^{2} (16.80 sq mi)
- Elevation: 417 m (1,368 ft)

Population (2025)
  - Total: 2,105
- Time zone: UTC+1 (CET)
  - Summer (DST): UTC+2 (CEST)
- Postal code: 976 62
- Area code: +421 48
- Vehicle registration plate (until 2022): BB
- Website: www.brusno.sk

Brusno (Hungarian: Borosznó) is a village and municipality in Banská Bystrica District in the Banská Bystrica Region of central Slovakia.

== History ==
In historical records the village was first mentioned in 1402.

== Geography ==
The municipality lies at an altitude of 417 metres (1,368 ft) and covers an area of 43.51 km^{2} (16.80 sq mi) (2025).

== Population ==
Population statistic (10 years)
Year	1995	2005	2015	2025
Count	2076	2100	2172	2105
Difference		+1.15%	+3.42%	−3.08%

Population statistic
Year	2024	2025
Count	2122	2105
Difference		−0.80%

It has a population of 2105 people (31 December 2025).

=== Ethnicity ===
Census 2021 (1+ %)
Ethnicity	Number	Fraction
Slovak	2065	95.91%
Not found out	77	3.57%
Total	2153	

In year 2021 was 2153 people by ethnicity 2065 as Slovak, 77 as Not found out, 12 as Czech, 9 as Russian, 7 as Other, 3 as Austrian, 3 as Hungarian, 3 as Canadian, 1 as Vietnamese, 1 as Ukrainian, 1 as Italian, 1 as Romani, 1 as Rusyn, 1 as Romanian, 1 as French and 1 as English.

Note on population: The difference values of population numbers in the table "Population statistic" and in the sections "Ethnicity" & "Religion" is caused by the use of various statistical methods.

=== Religion ===
Census 2021 (1+ %)
Religion	Number	Fraction
Roman Catholic Church	1468	68.18%
None	473	21.97%
Not found out	78	3.62%
Evangelical Church	68	3.16%
Total	2153	

In year 2021 was 2153 people by religion 1468 from Roman Catholic Church, 473 from None, 78 from Not found out, 68 from Evangelical Church, 18 from Greek Catholic Church, 12 from Ad hoc movements, 11 from Other, 6 from Other and not ascertained christian church, 5 from Christian Congregations in Slovakia, 4 from Eastern Orthodox Church, 3 from Calvinist Church, 3 from Buddhism, 2 from Paganism and natural spirituality, 1 from Hinduism and 1 from Czechoslovak Hussite Church.
