= Priechod =

Priechod Perhát
- Municipality
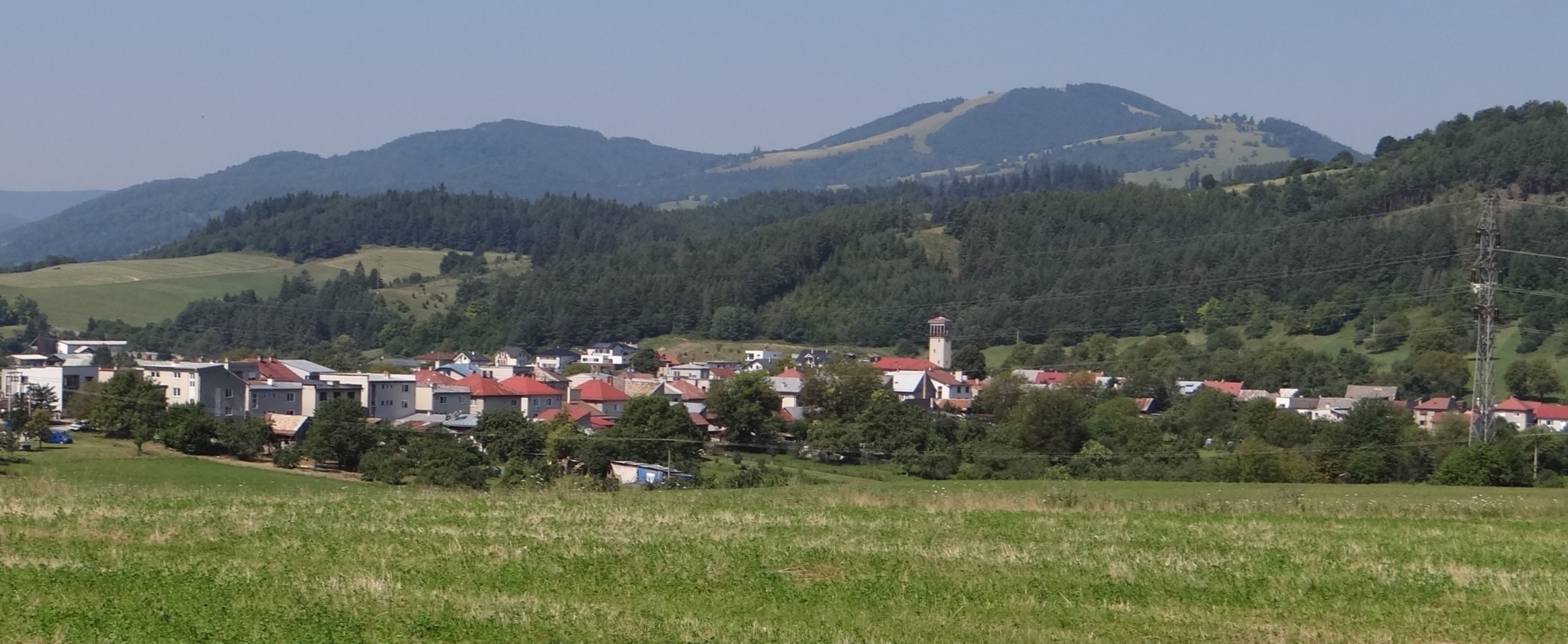

- Flag

- Location of Priechod in the Banská Bystrica Region Location of Priechod in Slovakia
- Coordinates: 48.78°N 19.23°E
- Country: Slovakia
- Region: Banská Bystrica Region
- District: Banská Bystrica District
- First mentioned: 1340

Area
  - Total: 11.21 km^{2} (4.33 sq mi)
- Elevation: 463 m (1,519 ft)

Population (2025)
  - Total: 1,009
- Time zone: UTC+1 (CET)
  - Summer (DST): UTC+2 (CEST)
- Postal code: 976 11
- Area code: +421 48
- Vehicle registration plate (until 2022): BB
- Website: www.priechod.sk

Priechod (Hungarian: Perhát) is a village and municipality in Banská Bystrica District in the Banská Bystrica Region of central Slovakia.

== History ==
In historical records the village was first mentioned in 1340.

== Geography ==
The municipality lies at an altitude of 460 metres and covers an area of 11.211 km^{2}.

== Geography ==
The municipality lies at an altitude of 463 metres (1,519 ft) and covers an area of 11.21 km^{2} (4.33 sq mi) (2025).

== Population ==
Population statistic (10 years)
Year	1995	2005	2015	2025
Count	864	915	918	1009
Difference		+5.90%	+0.32%	+9.91%

Population statistic
Year	2024	2025
Count	1030	1009
Difference		−2.03%

It has a population of 1009 people (31 December 2025).

=== Ethnicity ===
Census 2021 (1+ %)
Ethnicity	Number	Fraction
Slovak	1002	99.3%
Total	1009	

In year 2021 was 1009 people by ethnicity 1002 as Slovak, 5 as Jewish, 5 as Not found out, 4 as Czech, 2 as Other, 1 as Romani, 1 as Russian and 1 as German.

Note on population: The difference values of population numbers in the table "Population statistic" and in the sections "Ethnicity" & "Religion" is caused by the use of various statistical methods.

=== Religion ===
Census 2021 (1+ %)
Religion	Number	Fraction
Roman Catholic Church	726	71.95%
None	198	19.62%
Evangelical Church	39	3.87%
Not found out	14	1.39%
Total	1009	

In year 2021 was 1009 people by religion 726 from Roman Catholic Church, 198 from None, 39 from Evangelical Church, 14 from Not found out, 6 from Other, 5 from Jewish community, 5 from Other and not ascertained christian church, 5 from Greek Catholic Church, 4 from Apostolic Church, 4 from Ad hoc movements, 2 from Jehovah's Witnesses and 1 from Christian Congregations in Slovakia.
