= Baláže =

Municipality of Slovakia

Baláže Balázs
- Municipality
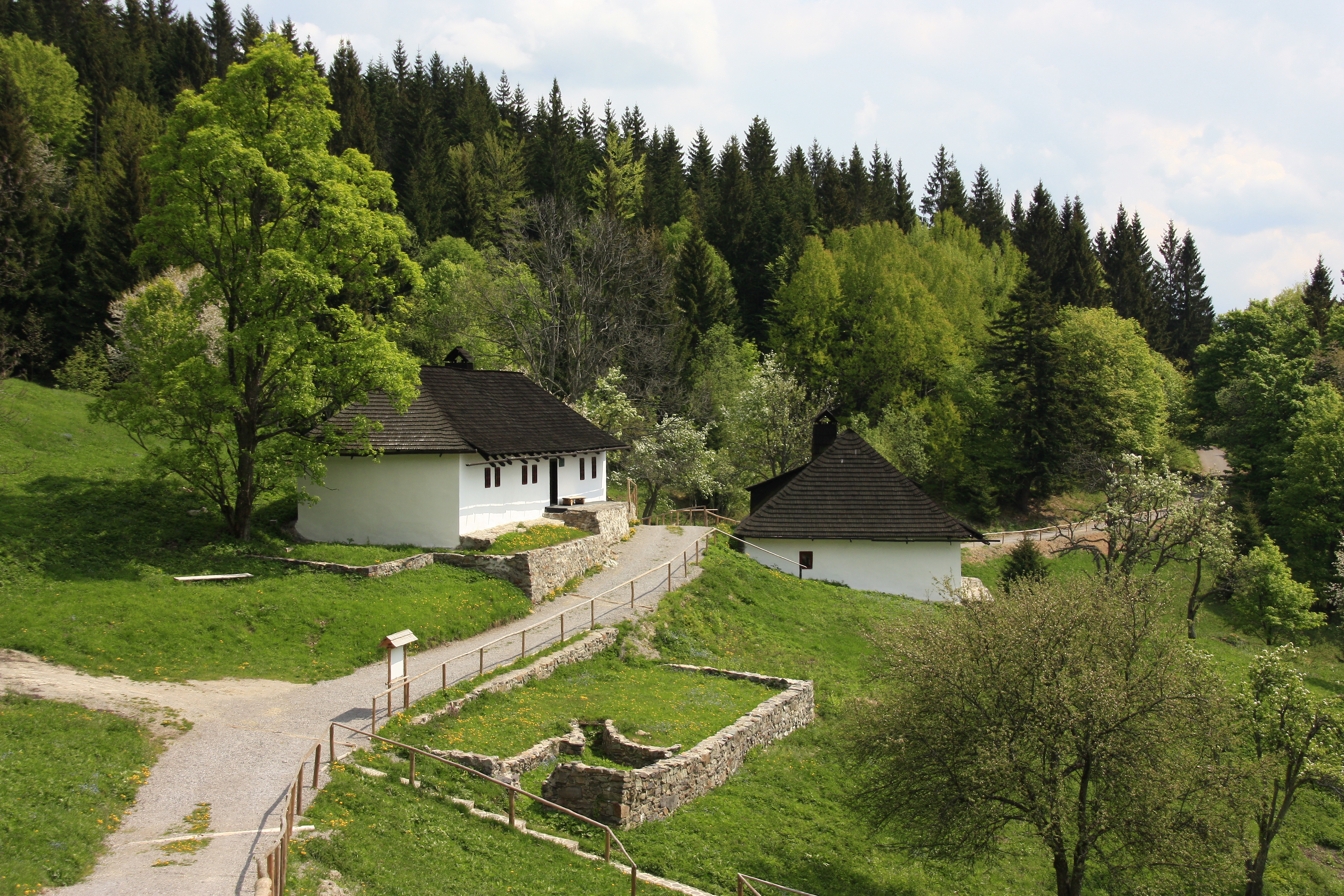

- Flag

- Location of Baláže in the Banská Bystrica Region Location of Baláže in Slovakia
- Coordinates: 48.82°N 19.20°E
- Country: Slovakia
- Region: Banská Bystrica Region
- District: Banská Bystrica District
- First mentioned: 1529

Government
  - Mayor: Robert Chaban

Area
  - Total: 14.21 km^{2} (5.49 sq mi)
- Elevation: 538 m (1,765 ft)

Population (2025)
  - Total: 227
- Time zone: UTC+1 (CET)
  - Summer (DST): UTC+2 (CEST)
- Postal code: 976 11
- Area code: +421 48
- Vehicle registration plate (until 2022): BB
- Website: www.balaze.sk

Baláže (German: Lipscherseifen; Hungarian: Balázs) is a village and municipality in the Banská Bystrica District in the Banská Bystrica Region of Slovakia.

== Geography ==
The municipality lies at an altitude of 538 metres (1,765 ft) and covers an area of 14.21 km^{2} (5.49 sq mi) (2025).

== History ==
In historical records, the village was first mentioned in 1529 (1529 Huttae Lyptyczae, 1531 Lyptzcicz, 1540 Lypschersaifen), when it belonged to a certain citizen Kolmann from Banská Bystrica. Later, it was sold to Lang, Glocknitzer, Petermann and Königsberger. From 1469 to 1546 it belonged to the noble family of Thurzo and the rich merchants Fuggers.

== Population ==
Population statistic (10 years)
Year	1995	2005	2015	2025
Count	199	192	211	227
Difference		−3.51%	+9.89%	+7.58%

Population statistic
Year	2024	2025
Count	229	227
Difference		−0.87%

It has a population of 227 people (31 December 2025).

=== Ethnicity ===
Census 2021 (1+ %)
Ethnicity	Number	Fraction
Slovak	218	98.64%
Czech	5	2.26%
Total	221	

In year 2021 was 221 people by ethnicity 218 as Slovak, 5 as Czech, 2 as Hungarian and 1 as Not found out.

Note on population: The difference values of population numbers in the table "Population statistic" and in the sections "Ethnicity" & "Religion" is caused by the use of various statistical methods.

=== Religion ===
Census 2021 (1+ %)
Religion	Number	Fraction
Roman Catholic Church	147	66.52%
None	69	31.22%
Total	221	

In year 2021 was 221 people by religion 147 from Roman Catholic Church, 69 from None, 2 from Evangelical Church, 2 from Ad hoc movements and 1 from Buddhism.

== Genealogical resources ==
The records for genealogical research are available at the state archive in Banská Bystrica (Slovak: Štátny archív v Banskej Bystrici).

- Roman Catholic church records (births/marriages/deaths): 1658-1786 (parish C), 1787-1896 (parish B)
- Census records 1869 of Balaze are not available at the state archive.

== See also ==
- List of municipalities and towns in Slovakia
