= Staré Hory (disambiguation) =

Staré Hory is a municipality and village in Slovakia.

Staré Hory may also refer to places:

- Staré Hory Mountains, a mountain range in Slovakia
- Staré Hory, a municipal part of Jihlava, Czech Republic
