= Basilica of the Visitation of the Blessed Virgin Mary =

Basilica of the Visitation of the Blessed Virgin Mary is the name of several churches:

- Basilica of the Visitation of the Blessed Virgin Mary, Levoča, Slovakia
- Basilica of the Visitation of the Blessed Virgin Mary, Staré Hory, Slovakia
- Basilica of the Visitation of the Blessed Virgin Mary, Trakai, Lithuania
