= Ilja Völlmy Kudryavtsev =

- Born: Saint Petersburg, Russia
- Education: Saint Petersburg Conservatory; Royal Academy of Music (DipRAM)
- Occupations: Organist, Pianist
- Known for: Organ performance, Titular Organist at Stadtkirche Liestal, Artistic Director of Liestaler Internationaler Orgelfestival
- Spouse: Annina Völlmy

Ilja Völlmy Kudryavtsev is a Russian-born organist and pianist based in Switzerland. He serves as the titular organist at the Stadtkirche St. Martin in Liestal, Switzerland, where he also organizes concert series and founded the Liestaler Internationaler Orgelfestival, serving as its artistic director. He performs internationally and his repertoire spans various eras, with a particular focus on 19th and 20th-century organ music, as well as contemporary and avant-garde works.

== Early life and education ==
Born in Saint Petersburg, Russia, Kudryavtsev began piano studies at age 7 and took up the organ at age 16. As organ music is not traditional in the Russian Orthodox Church, he practiced and later became an organist at a Finnish-Lutheran church in St. Petersburg.

From 2001 to 2006, he studied at the Saint Petersburg Conservatory as both an organist and pianist. In September 2006, he received an entrance scholarship to pursue postgraduate studies at the Royal Academy of Music in London. There, he studied interpretation with David Titterington and improvisation with Lionel Rogg. During his time at the Academy, he received various scholarships and prizes, graduating with the DipRAM award in 2008. He also held a Fellowship at the Academy from 2008 to 2009.

== Career ==
While studying in London, Kudryavtsev performed as a recitalist in several major festivals, including the Spitalfields Festival, London Handel Festival, City of London Festival, and the Southbank Centre's Messiaen Festival in 2008.

In 2009, Kudryavtsev moved to Switzerland to become the "titulaire" (titular) organist at the Stadtkirche St. Martin in Liestal, a main church in the cantonal capital. The church houses a notable romantic organ built in 1863 by the French firm Merklin-Schütze. In Liestal, Kudryavtsev organizes the “Heure Mystique” concert series, the "Easter music festival", and directs the annual "Orgelnacht" (Organ Night) event. In 2016/2017, he founded and became the artistic director of the “Liestaler Internationaler Orgelfestival”.

Kudryavtsev gives regular recitals throughout Switzerland, France, Germany, Italy, Ireland, Russia, and the United Kingdom. Notable international engagements include performances at the Vivat Vox Organi festival in Špania Dolina, Slovakia (2020), playing on the historic 1751 Martin Podkonický organ; a concert at the Garrison Church of St. Peter and Paul in Lviv, Ukraine (2017), which marked the first organ music heard in the church in 100 years (using a specially brought digital instrument); and participation in the "Organum Novum" contemporary music project at the Petrikirche in St. Petersburg (2020). He has also performed at venues such as Westminster Abbey, Basel Minster, St. Jakob, Zürich, Heiliggeist Bern, and the Abbatiale Saint-Ouen in Rouen.

In 2011, he won 3rd prize at the St. Maurice International Organ Competition in Switzerland.

Kudryavtsev frequently collaborates with other musicians. He performs regularly with his wife, cellist Annina Völlmy, sometimes under the name "Duo Chants Russes". Together with soprano Jeanne Pascal Künzli, they form the "Trio Via Cantante". He also engages in projects combining the organ with instruments like flute, saxophone, or percussion (e.g., with Luzian Graber and Ben Zahler) or with art forms like pantomime and dance, and practices improvisation based on texts or images.

== Repertoire ==
While his repertoire encompasses music from all historical periods, Kudryavtsev's main musical interests currently focus on 19th and 20th-century organ music. His programs have featured standard repertoire by composers such as César Franck, Charles-Marie Widor, Johann Sebastian Bach, and Wolfgang Amadeus Mozart, alongside works by Mykola Kolessa, Arnold Schoenberg, Louis Vierne, Alexander Glazunov, Sergei Rachmaninoff, Dmitri Shostakovich, and Ernest Bloch. He has also performed less common works, such as William Byrd's "The Bells", pieces by Jehan Titelouze, and Max Bruch's "Kol Nidrei". His participation in the "Organum Novum" project highlighted contemporary composers like Sergei Khismatov, Thanos Chrysakis, and Anna Korsun. His concert programs sometimes include his own compositions, arrangements, or improvisations, such as "Reflections for organ and cello" or improvisations within the "Duo Chants Russes".

== Personal life ==
Kudryavtsev is married to Swiss cellist Annina Völlmy. She is a graduate of the St. Petersburg Conservatory, where she studied under A. Nikitin, has been an active concertmaster since 2001, and specializes in chamber music, church music, and improvisation. The couple met while Kudryavtsev was still in Russia and perform frequently together.

Following the full-scale Russian invasion of Ukraine in 2022, Kudryavtsev has publicly supported Ukraine by playing benefit concerts, raising funds for medical supplies, and attending Ukrainian community events in Switzerland. He has stated that the war has caused a deep rift between him and his parents, who remain in Russia and hold differing views influenced by Russian state media. Kudryavtsev has described their situations as living in "different worlds" ("verschiedenen Welten"). He believes he is now considered a "traitor" ("Landesverräter") in Russia and cannot return. He feels settled in the Baselbiet region and comfortable within the Swiss Reformed Church.
