= Basilica of the Visitation of the Blessed Virgin Mary, Staré Hory =

Roman Catholic minor basilica

Coordinates: 48°50′02.3″N 19°06′46.2″E

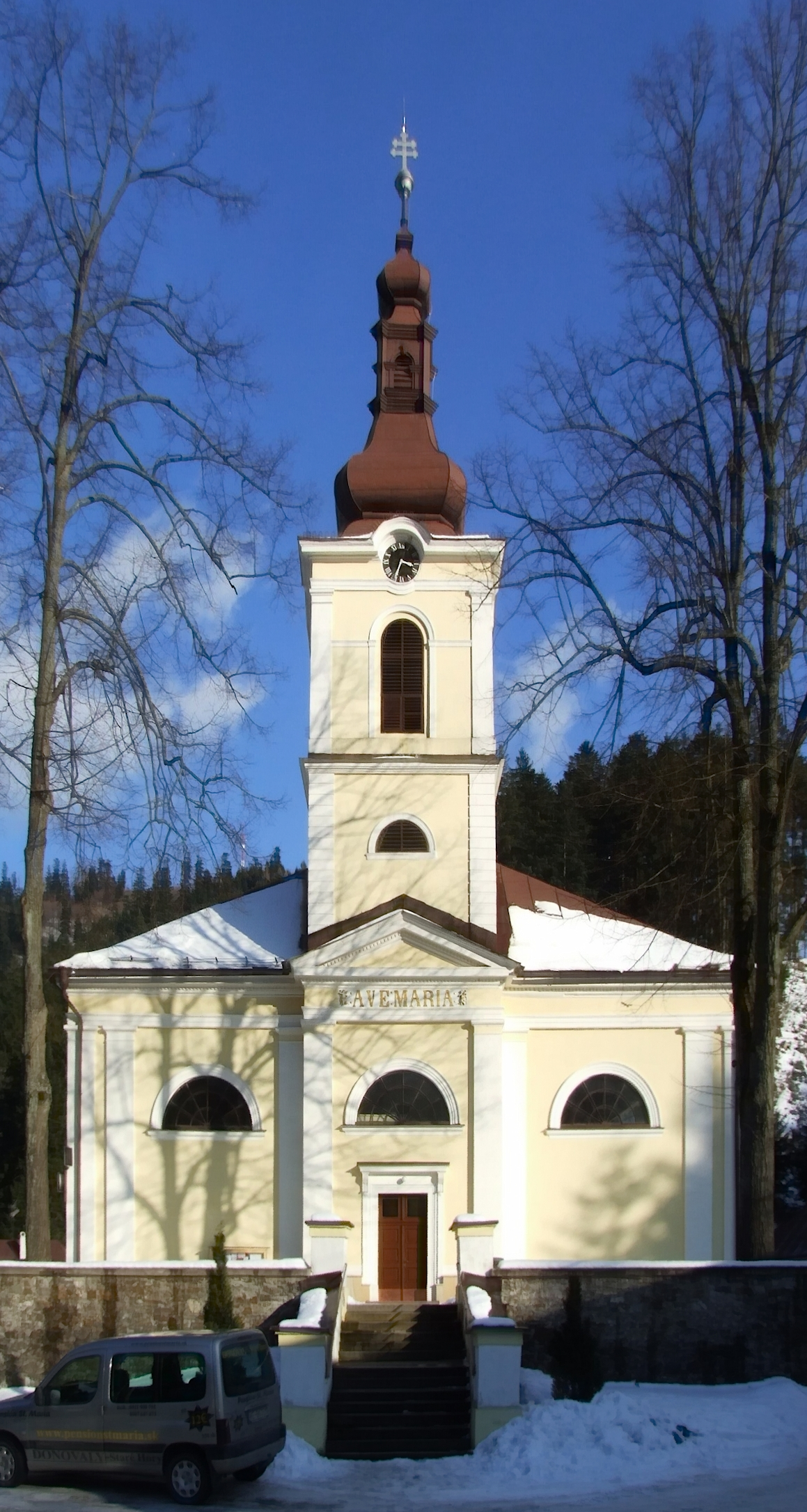
The Basilica of the Visitation of the Blessed Virgin Mary, Staré Hory

The Basilica of the Visitation of the Blessed Virgin Mary (Slovak: Bazilika navštívenia Panny Márie) in Staré Hory, Slovakia is a Roman Catholic basilica minor church. The decree designating it a basilica was issued in 1990.

Staré Hory is a village in the Banská Bystrica Region in Central Slovakia. It is in the Staré Hory Mountains, between the Veľká Fatra and Low Tatra mountain ranges.

The village became a destination for annual Marian pilgrimages in the 15th century. The first church was built in 1448 by Michal Konigzberg. Reconstructions occurred in 1499, 1589, 1722 and 1850, when two side naves were added. The building has been listed since 1963 as a Slovak National Cultural Monument.

Close to the church is Studnička, a well, which according to legend served as a hiding place for a statue of Mary during religious unrest in the 17th century, during which period Jesuits established a mission in the village. In 1711 it was retrieved and returned to the church. The well also became an attraction for pilgrims. From 1780 pilgrims to Staré Hory were formally granted indulgences by Pope Pius VI. in 1942 Studnička was formally sanctified. When the church became a basilica minor in 1990 12,000 pilgrims attended.
