= Donovaly =

- Municipality
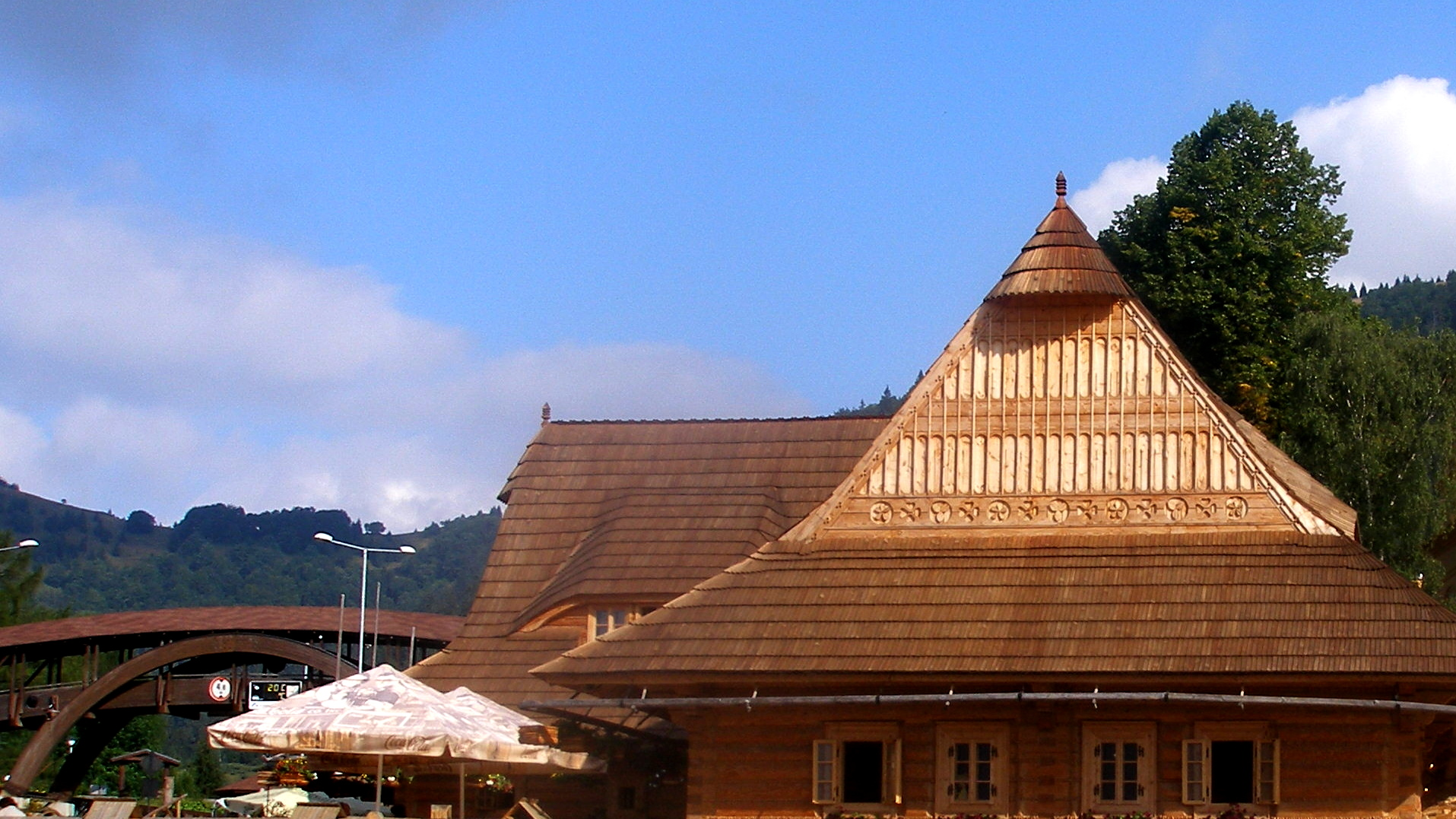

- Flag Coat of arms

- Location of Donovaly in the Banská Bystrica Region Location of Donovaly in Slovakia
- Coordinates: 48.88°N 19.23°E
- Country: Slovakia
- Region: Banská Bystrica Region
- District: Banská Bystrica District
- First mentioned: 1618

Government
  - Mayor: Miroslav Daňo

Area
  - Total: 17.50 km^{2} (6.76 sq mi)
- Elevation: 972 m (3,189 ft)

Population (2025)
  - Total: 281
- Time zone: UTC+1 (CET)
  - Summer (DST): UTC+2 (CEST)
- Postal code: 976 39
- Area code: +421 48
- Vehicle registration plate (until 2022): BB
- Website: www.donovaly.sk

Donovaly (Hungarian: Dóval) is a village in the Banská Bystrica Region of central Slovakia. Being situated in an important pass between the mountains of Veľká Fatra and Starohorské vrchy, on the route connecting Banská Bystrica with Ružomberok, it became a prominent centre of winter and summer sports.

== Geography ==
The municipality lies at an altitude of 972 metres (3,189 ft) and covers an area of 17.50 km^{2} (6.76 sq mi) (2025).

== History ==
Donovaly was founded in the early 17th century. During World War II, it became an important center of the anti-German Resistance.

== Population ==
Population statistic (10 years)
Year	1995	2005	2015	2025
Count	151	154	227	281
Difference		+1.98%	+47.40%	+23.78%

Population statistic
Year	2024	2025
Count	283	281
Difference		−0.70%

It has a population of 281 people (31 December 2025).

=== Ethnicity ===
Census 2021 (1+ %)
Ethnicity	Number	Fraction
Slovak	225	90.36%
Not found out	12	4.81%
Other	6	2.4%
Ukrainian	4	1.6%
German	4	1.6%
Total	249	

In year 2021 was 249 people by ethnicity 225 as Slovak, 12 as Not found out, 6 as Other, 4 as Ukrainian, 4 as German, 2 as Czech, 1 as Russian, 1 as Polish and 1 as Hungarian.

Note on population: The difference values of population numbers in the table "Population statistic" and in the sections "Ethnicity" & "Religion" is caused by the use of various statistical methods.

=== Religion ===
Census 2021 (1+ %)
Religion	Number	Fraction
None	110	44.18%
Roman Catholic Church	104	41.77%
Not found out	12	4.82%
Evangelical Church	12	4.82%
Total	249	

In year 2021 was 249 people by religion 110 from None, 104 from Roman Catholic Church, 12 from Not found out, 12 from Evangelical Church, 2 from Eastern Orthodox Church, 2 from Other, 2 from Hinduism, 1 from Paganism and natural spirituality, 1 from Christian Congregations in Slovakia, 1 from Seventh-day Adventist Church, 1 from Apostolic Church and 1 from Ad hoc movements.

== Tourism ==
Donovaly is a part of Low Tatras National Park, and it hosts one of the biggest and most popular ski resorts in Slovakia. Elevation is between 910 – 1,402 m, and there are more than 11 km of ski slopes, 17 lifts and elevators. In 2006, the Telemix lift by POMA, France – the 3rd of this kind in the world – was installed. It consists of 6 seated lift chairs, and 8 seated cabins, so the skiers can choose how they will go up to the top. Winter season starts from end of November and lasts until late March, beginning of April. It is also renowned for its dogsled racing championships.

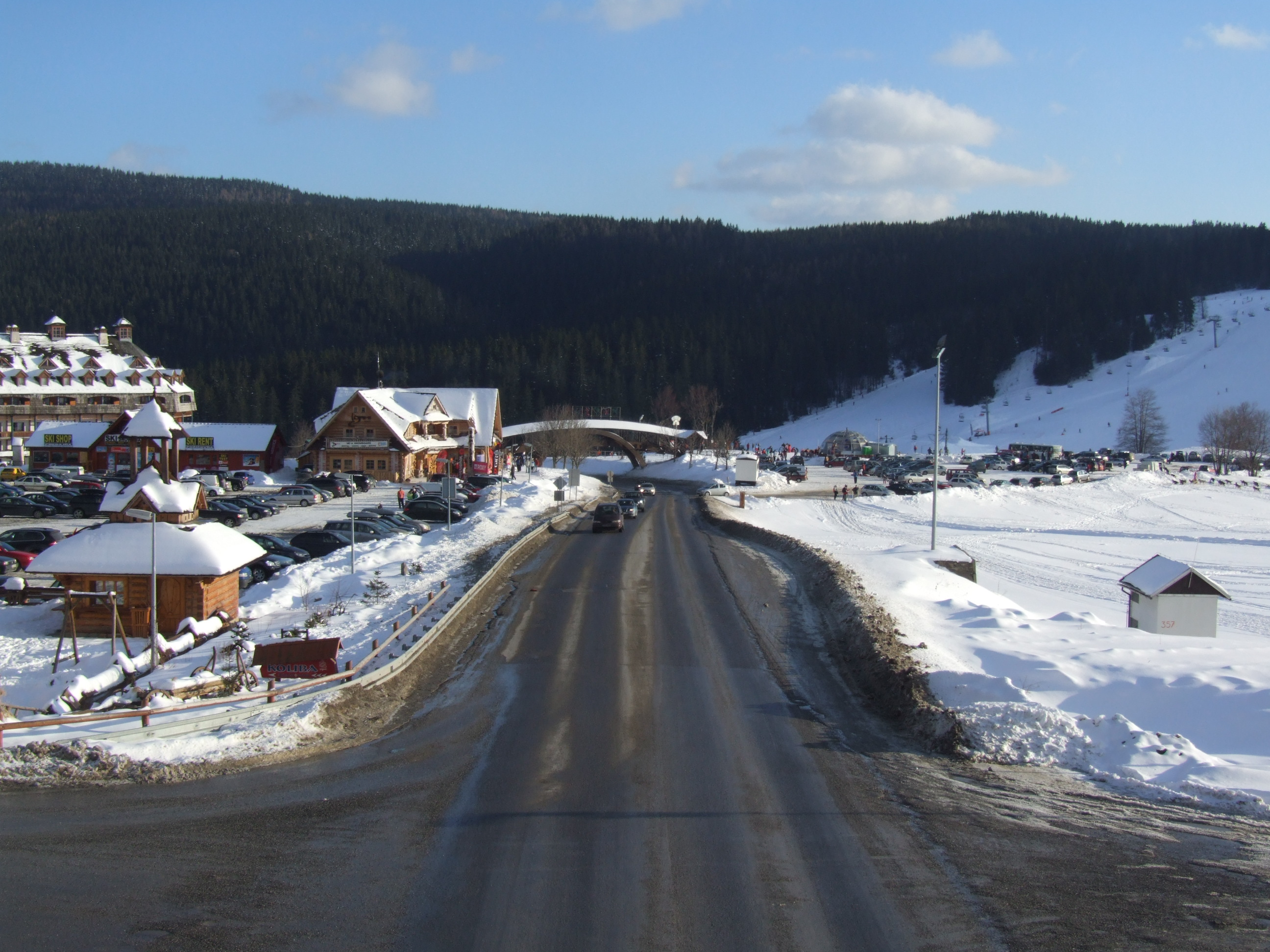
State road 59 in Donovaly

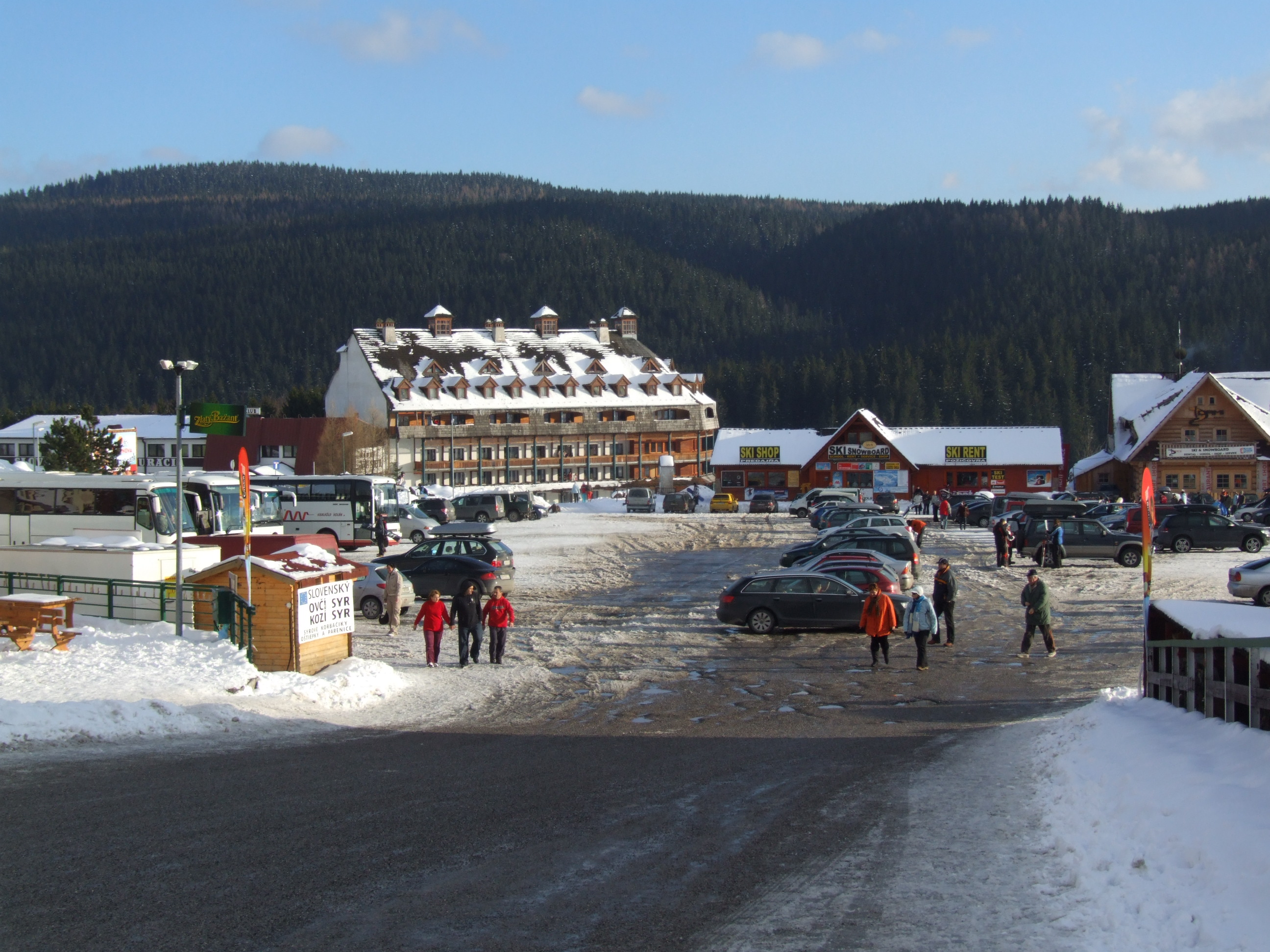
Parking for tourists

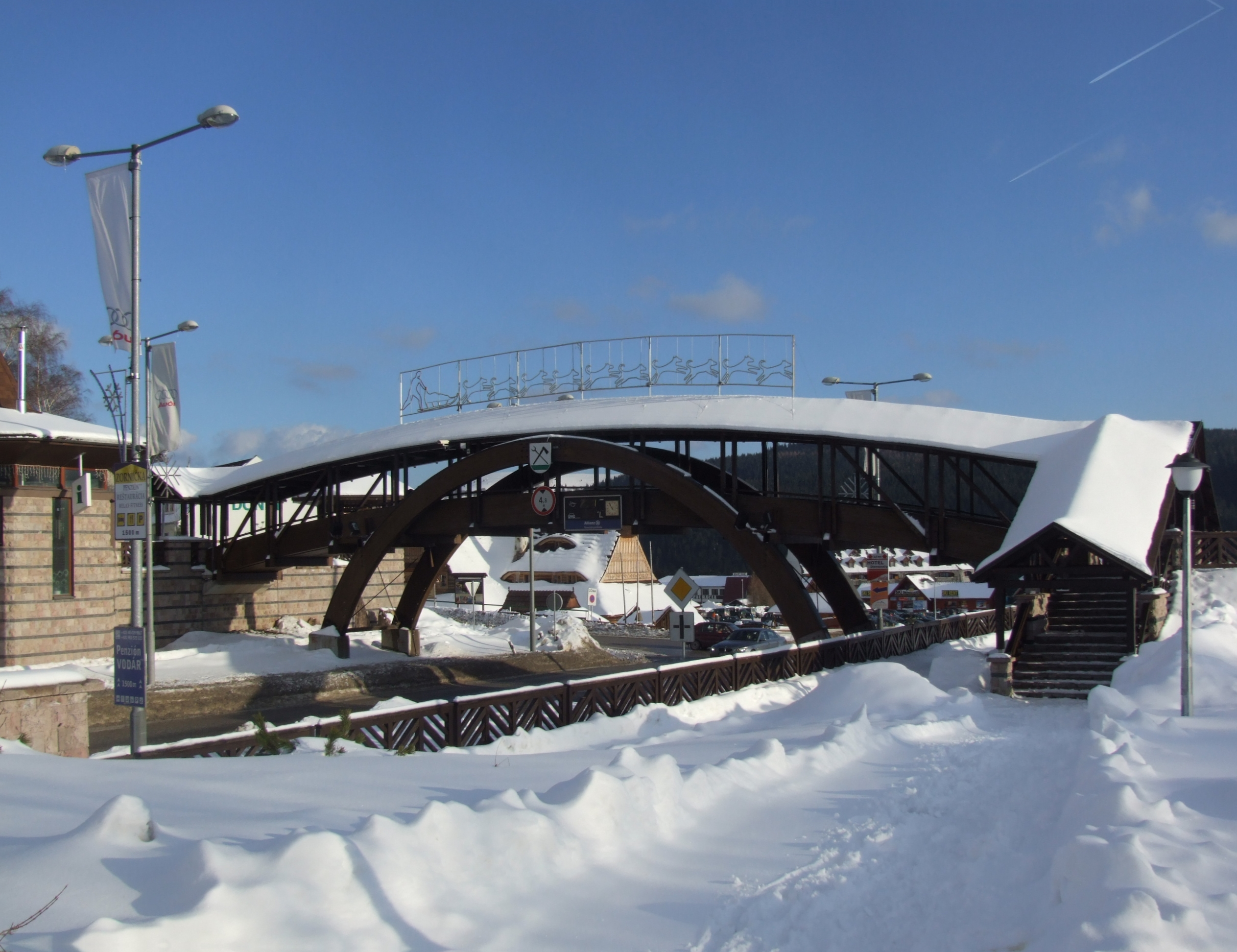
Footbridge in Donovaly

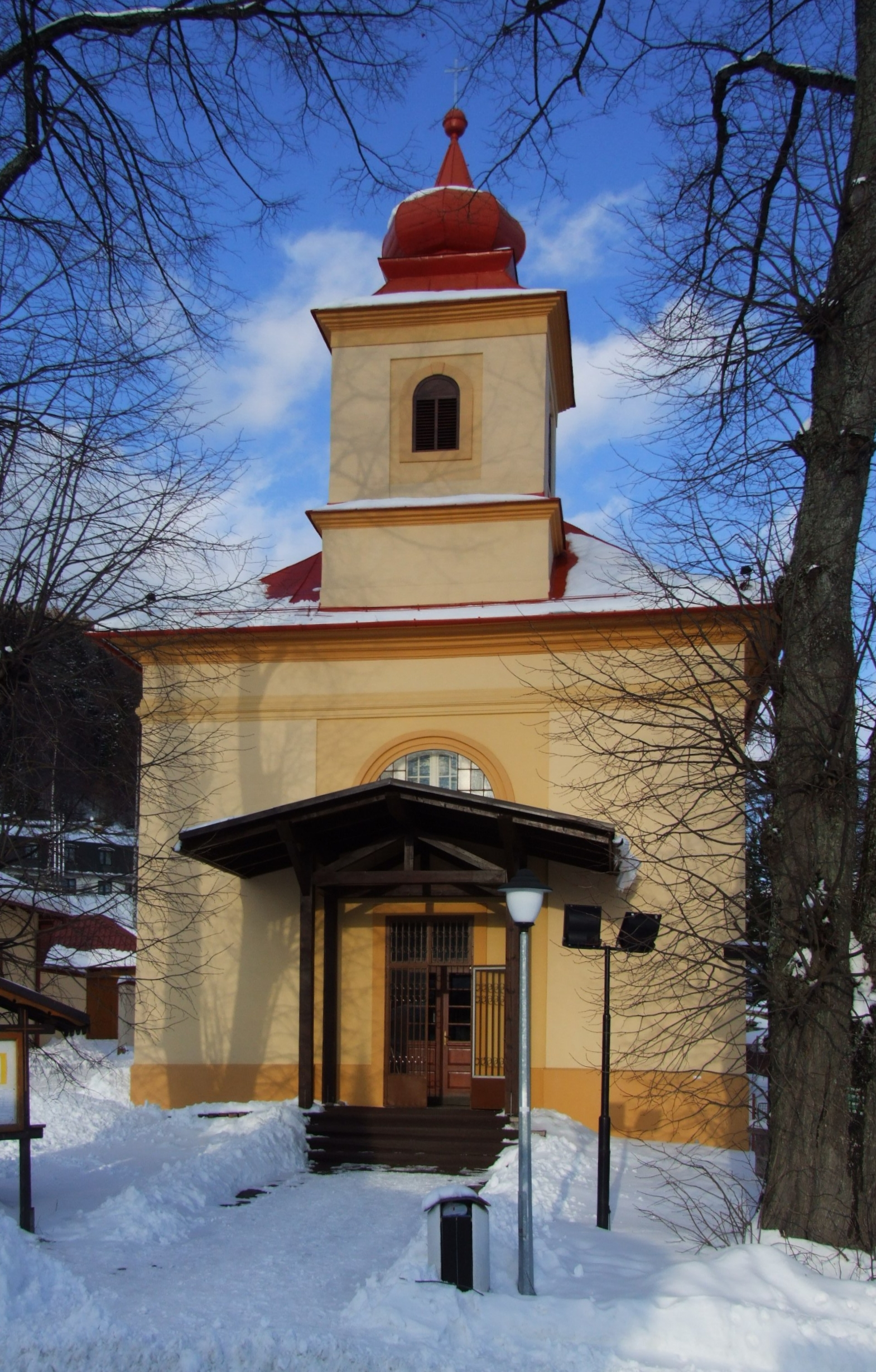
Small church in village

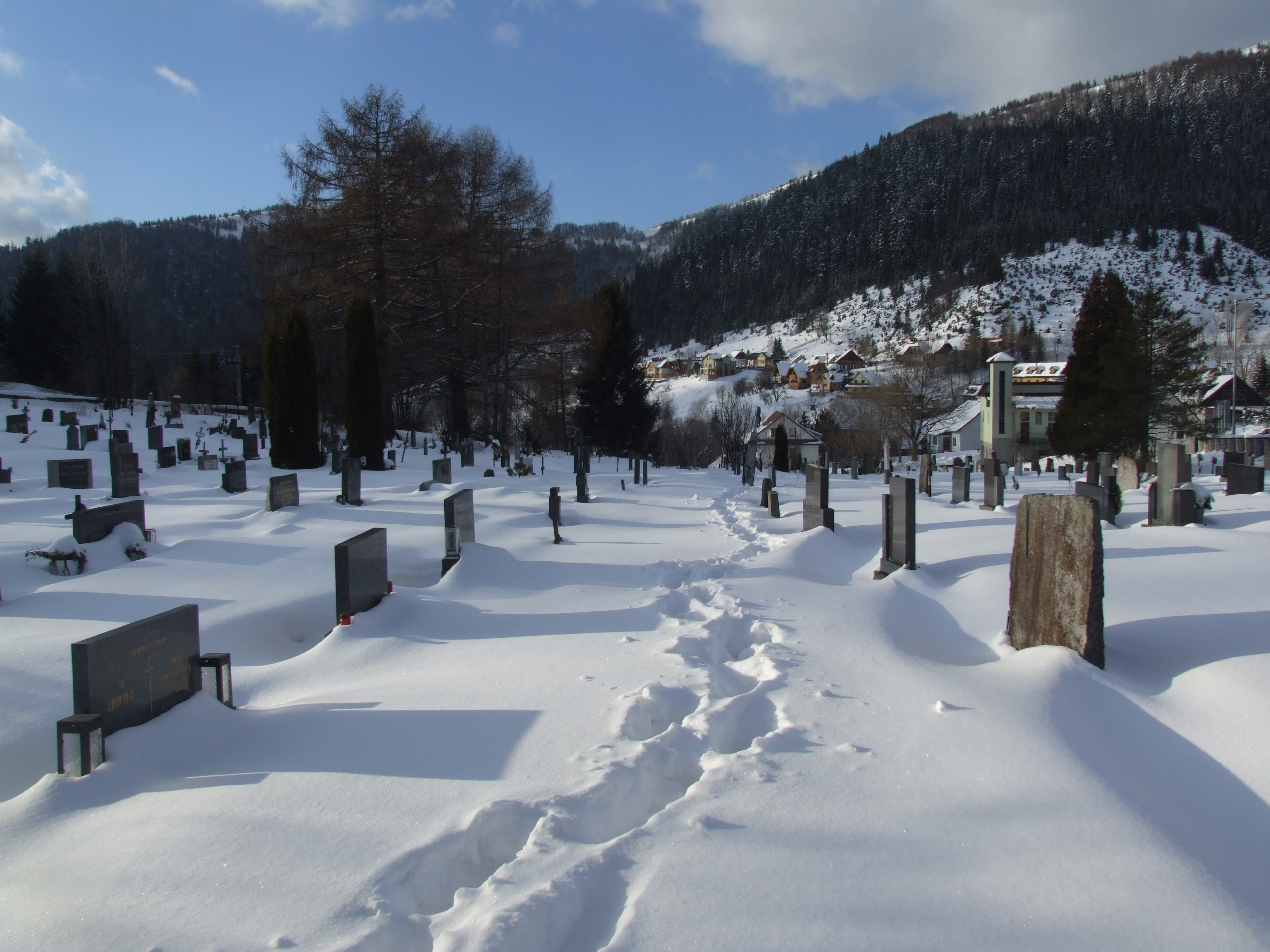
Cemetery

== See also ==
- List of municipalities and towns in Slovakia

== Genealogical resources ==
The records for genealogical research are available at the state archive "Statny Archiv in Banska Bystrica, Slovakia"

- Roman Catholic church records (births/marriages/deaths): 1797-1897 (parish A)
