= Basilica of the Visitation of the Blessed Virgin Mary, Levoča =

Church building in Levoča District, Slovakia

Coordinates: 49.043056°N 20.597222°E

he Blessed Virgin Mary, Marian Hill, Levoča

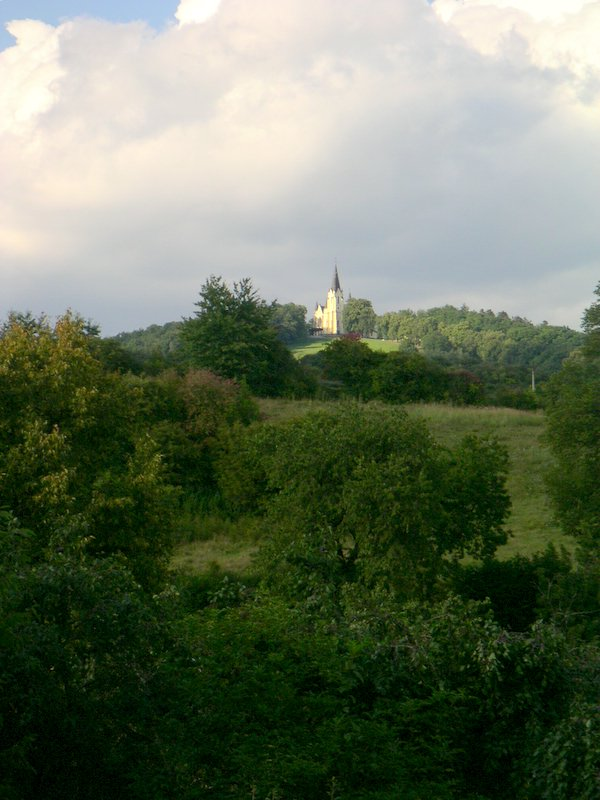
The

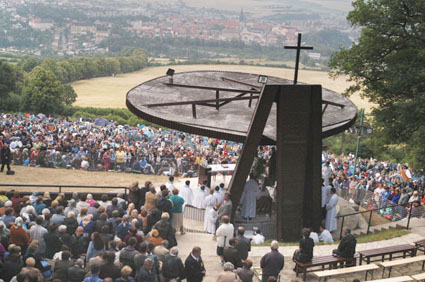
Annual pilgrimage at Marian Hill

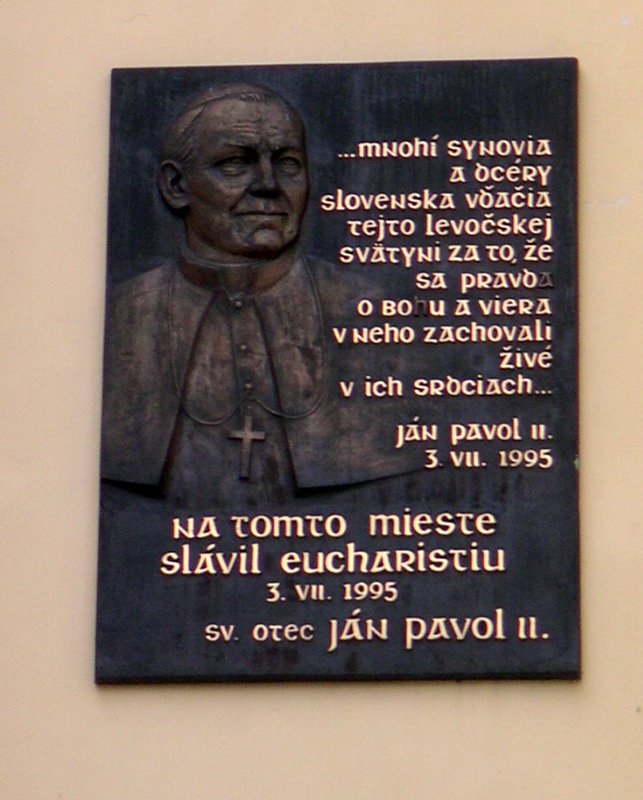
Plaque commemorating visit of Pope John Paul II

The Basilica of the Visitation of the Blessed Virgin Mary (Slovak: Bazilika navštívenia Panny Márie) in Levoča, Slovakia is located at the summit of Mariánska hora (English: Marian Hill), (Slovak pronunciation: [ˈmarijaːnska ˈɦɔra]; 781 m. above sea level), a hill above Levoča with views over the town and countryside. Built in its present form between 1906 and 1922, the church is the destination of an annual major pilgrimage.

== First church ==
It is thought that the location of the chapel was used as a refuge by the townsfolk of Levoča during the Mongol invasions of the 13th century; it may also have been attached to a hospital for sufferers from leprosy. A chapel has existed on the site since at least the 13th century, and is mentioned in chronicles of 1247. It attracted pilgrims and there are records of repairs made to the church in 1311 and 1322.

== Second church ==
The chapel was enlarged and rebuilt in 1470, and is depicted in this form on the altar of Master Paul of Levoča in the Basilica of St. James in Levoča. In 1673 a group of shepherds allegedly witnessed an apparition of the Virgin Mary close to the church.

== Third church ==
A Baroque building replaced the second church in 1766. When Emperor Joseph II banned pilgrimages throughout the Austrian Empire in 1787, the church on Mariánska hora went into decline. Repairs did not commence until 1820. During the 19th century the church was furnished with an organ (1844), and statues in honour of Mary were erected on the path up the hill.

== The present church ==
The foundation stone for the present church was laid in 1903. Construction, to the design of the architect Anton Müller, was not completed until 1914, as a consequence of poor materials and the collapse of the new tower in 1908. Pope John Paul II, at the request of the local bishop, upgraded the church to a Basilica Minor in 1984, and visited the site himself on 3 July 1995, when about 650,000 pilgrims gathered for the occasion. The annual pilgrimage, on or around 2 July (Feast of the Visitation - still celebrated on the traditional date of 2 July in Slovakia), still draws a very large number of participants. On 3 October 2005, Levoča and Mariánska hora were selected to join the European Association of Marian Pilgrimage Sites.

== Greek Orthodox chapel ==
A Greek Orthodox chapel, consecrated in 1858, stands adjacent to the Basilica.
