= Staré Hory =

Staré Hory Óhegy
- Municipality
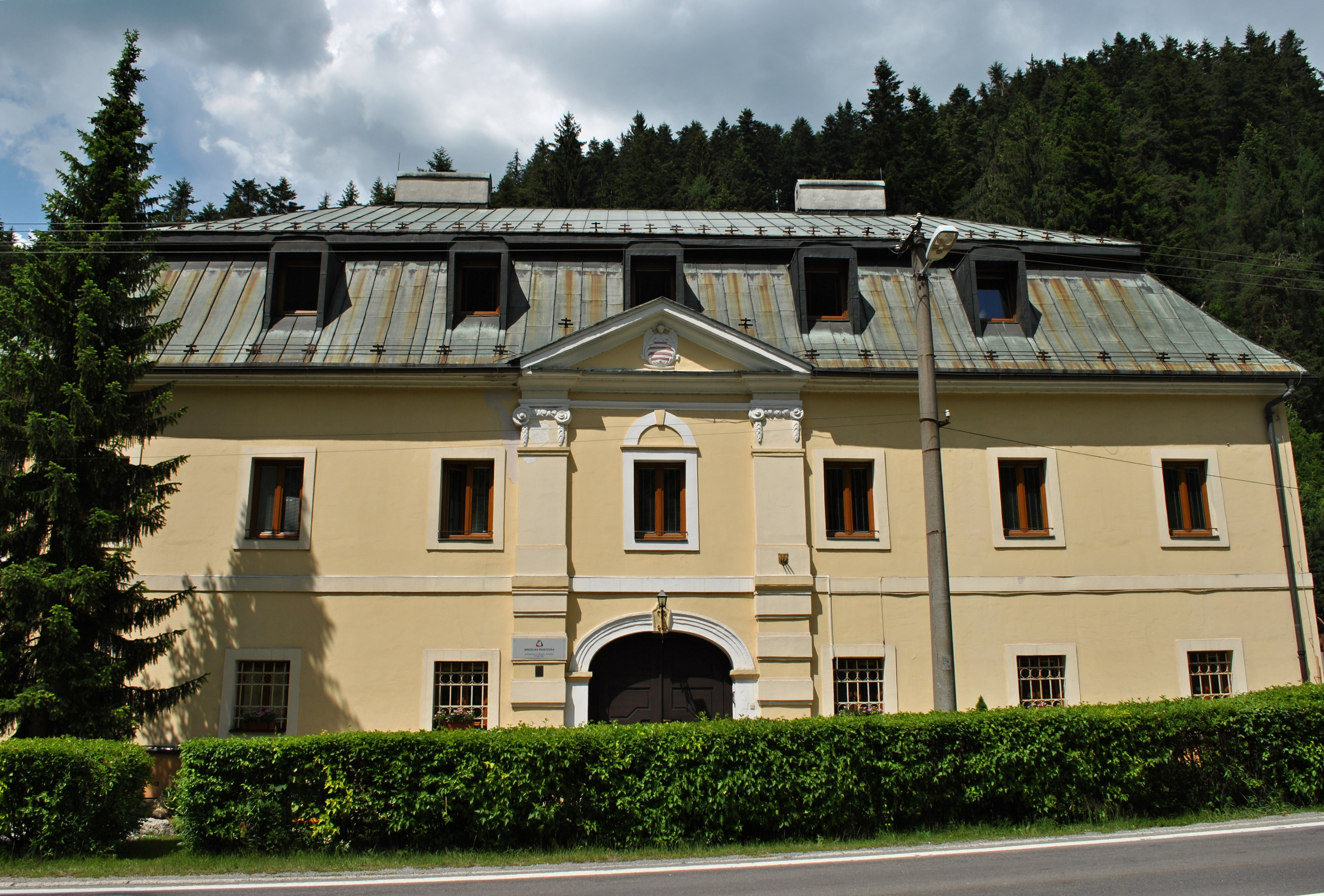

- Flag Coat of arms

- Location of Staré Hory in the Banská Bystrica Region Location of Staré Hory in Slovakia
- Coordinates: 48.83°N 19.12°E
- Country: Slovakia
- Region: Banská Bystrica Region
- District: Banská Bystrica District
- First mentioned: 1536

Area
  - Total: 41.56 km^{2} (16.05 sq mi)
- Elevation: 539 m (1,768 ft)

Population (2025)
  - Total: 568
- Time zone: UTC+1 (CET)
  - Summer (DST): UTC+2 (CEST)
- Postal code: 976 02
- Area code: +421 48
- Vehicle registration plate (until 2022): BB
- Website: www.starehory.sk

Staré Hory (Hungarian: Óhegy) is a village in the Banská Bystrica Region in Central Slovakia. It is situated in the Staré Hory Mountains, between the Veľká Fatra and Low Tatra mountain ranges. As of the end of 2019, the village had a population of 555.

The copper deposits in the vicinity of the village were exploited as early as 2000–1700 BC. The stone tools used by prehistoric miners have been found both in Staré Hory and the nearby village of Špania Dolina. However, the name of the village was mentioned for the first time in 1536. In the 16th century, a smelting plant was built there. After the mining industry declined, the main economic activity shifted from the production of copper and charcoal to making bobbin lace. Merchants from Staré Hory were selling bobbin lace all over Austria-Hungary.

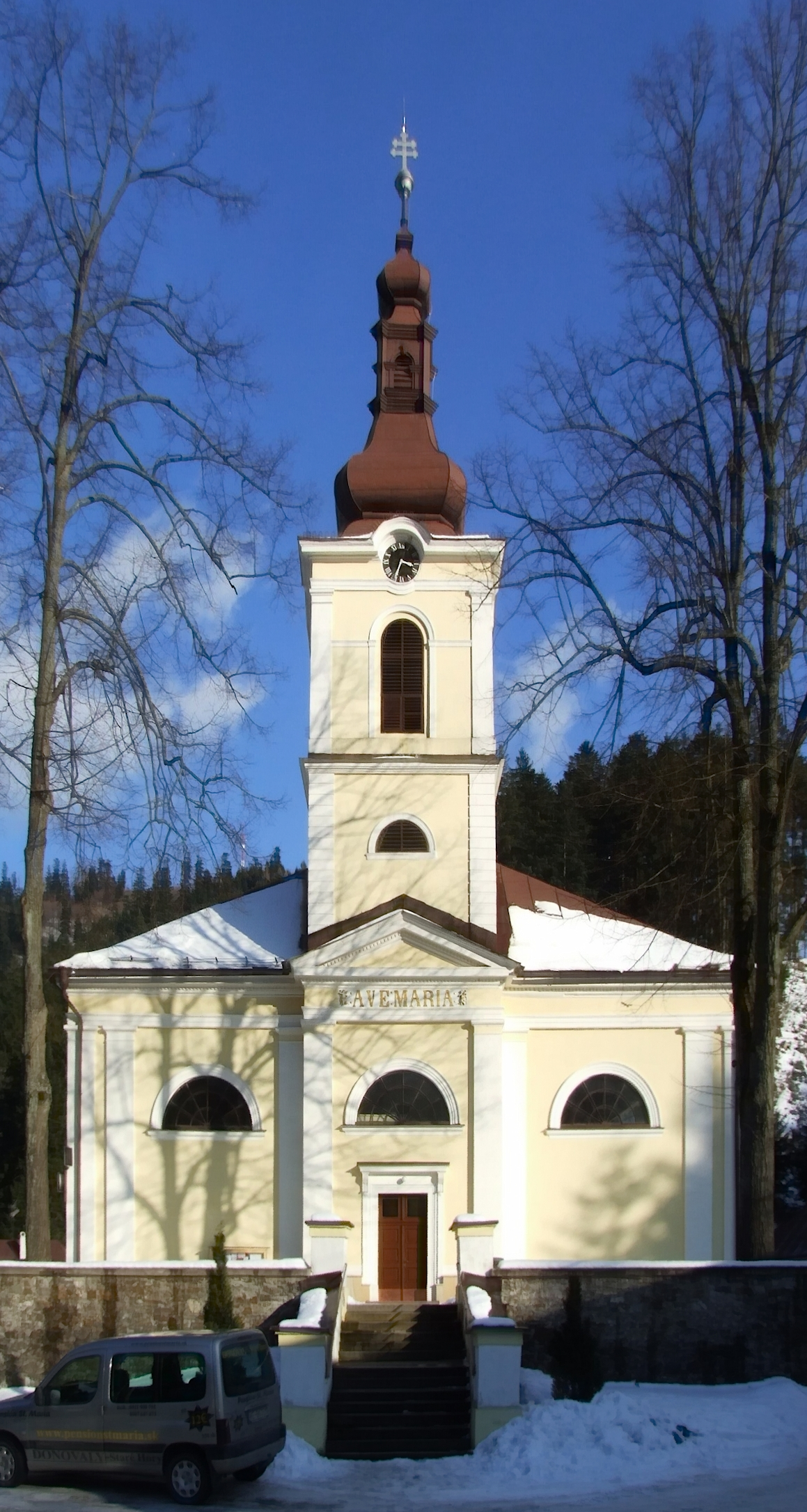
Basilica of the Visitation

A natural spring with a statue of Virgin Mary near Staré Hory is a traditional place of pilgrimage. There is also a Baroque church, originally built in the 15th century, situated in the village. This church dons the status of a minor basilica as classified by the Roman Catholic Church, the Basilica of the Visitation.

== Geography ==
The municipality lies at an altitude of 539 metres (1,768 ft) and covers an area of 41.56 km^{2} (16.05 sq mi) (2025).

== Population ==
Population statistic (10 years)
Year	1995	2005	2015	2025
Count	421	481	554	568
Difference		+14.25%	+15.17%	+2.52%

Population statistic
Year	2024	2025
Count	582	568
Difference		−2.40%

It has a population of 568 people (31 December 2025).

=== Ethnicity ===
Census 2021 (1+ %)
Ethnicity	Number	Fraction
Slovak	524	95.09%
Not found out	26	4.71%
Romani	7	1.27%
Total	551	

In year 2021 was 551 people by ethnicity 524 as Slovak, 26 as Not found out, 7 as Romani, 4 as Czech, 3 as Hungarian, 2 as Canadian, 2 as Other, 1 as Russian, 1 as Polish and 1 as German.

Note on population: The difference values of population numbers in the table "Population statistic" and in the sections "Ethnicity" & "Religion" is caused by the use of various statistical methods.

=== Religion ===
Census 2021 (1+ %)
Religion	Number	Fraction
Roman Catholic Church	302	54.81%
None	190	34.48%
Evangelical Church	32	5.81%
Not found out	17	3.09%
Total	551	

In year 2021 was 551 people by religion 302 from Roman Catholic Church, 190 from None, 32 from Evangelical Church, 17 from Not found out, 4 from Greek Catholic Church, 2 from Ad hoc movements, 1 from Eastern Orthodox Church, 1 from Other and not ascertained christian church, 1 from Christian Congregations in Slovakia and 1 from Other.
