= Špania Dolina =

- Municipality
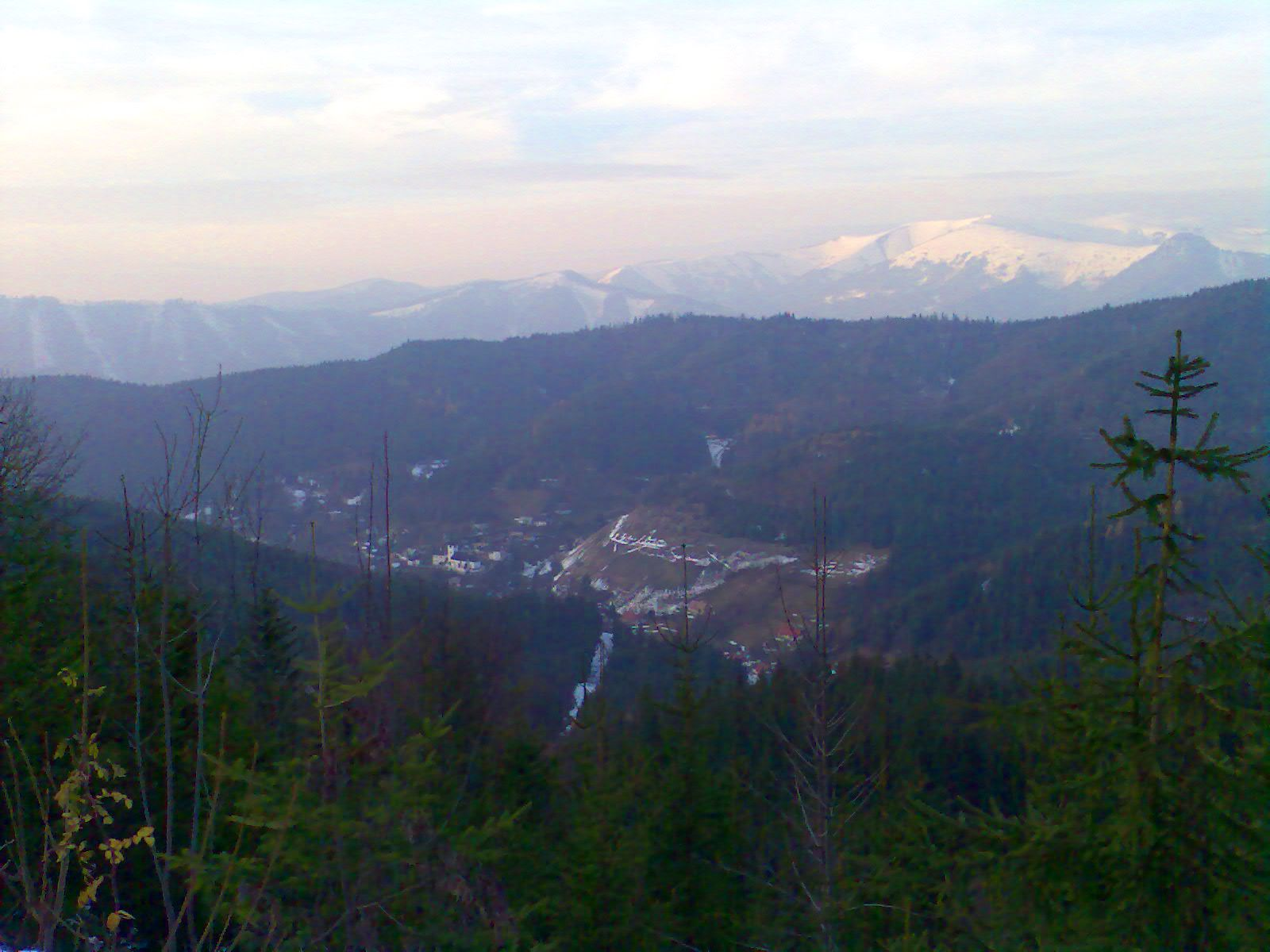
- Špania Dolina from Panský Diel

- Flag Coat of arms

- Location of Špania Dolina in the Banská Bystrica Region Location of Špania Dolina in Slovakia
- Coordinates: 48.82°N 19.13°E
- Country: Slovakia
- Region: Banská Bystrica Region
- District: Banská Bystrica District
- First mentioned: 1263

Government
  - Mayor: Martina Wilhelmerová

Area
  - Total: 12.72 km^{2} (4.91 sq mi)
- Elevation: 711 m (2,333 ft)

Population (2025)
  - Total: 237
- Time zone: UTC+1 (CET)
  - Summer (DST): UTC+2 (CEST)
- Postal code: 974 15
- Area code: +421 48
- Vehicle registration plate (until 2022): BB
- Website: www.spaniadolina.sk

Špania Dolina is a village and municipality in central Slovakia, near the city of Banská Bystrica. Although its permanent population does not exceed 200 people, it is a picturesque historic village situated 728 m above sea level and is surrounded by the Staré Hory and Veľká Fatra mountains. It has become a popular tourist recreation centre.

== Geography ==
The municipality lies at an altitude of 711 metres (2,333 ft) and covers an area of 12.72 km^{2} (4.91 sq mi) (2025).

== Name ==
The ancient Latin name of the village is Valis Dominorum (meaning "Lord’s Valley"). The first part of the Slovak name ("Špania") is derived from another Latin word for "lord": spanatus. The second part ("Dolina") means "valley" in Slovak. The old German name of the village was Herrengrundt and it has been used for centuries by Carpathian Germans living in the area. The Hungarian name of the village is Úrvölgy.

== History ==
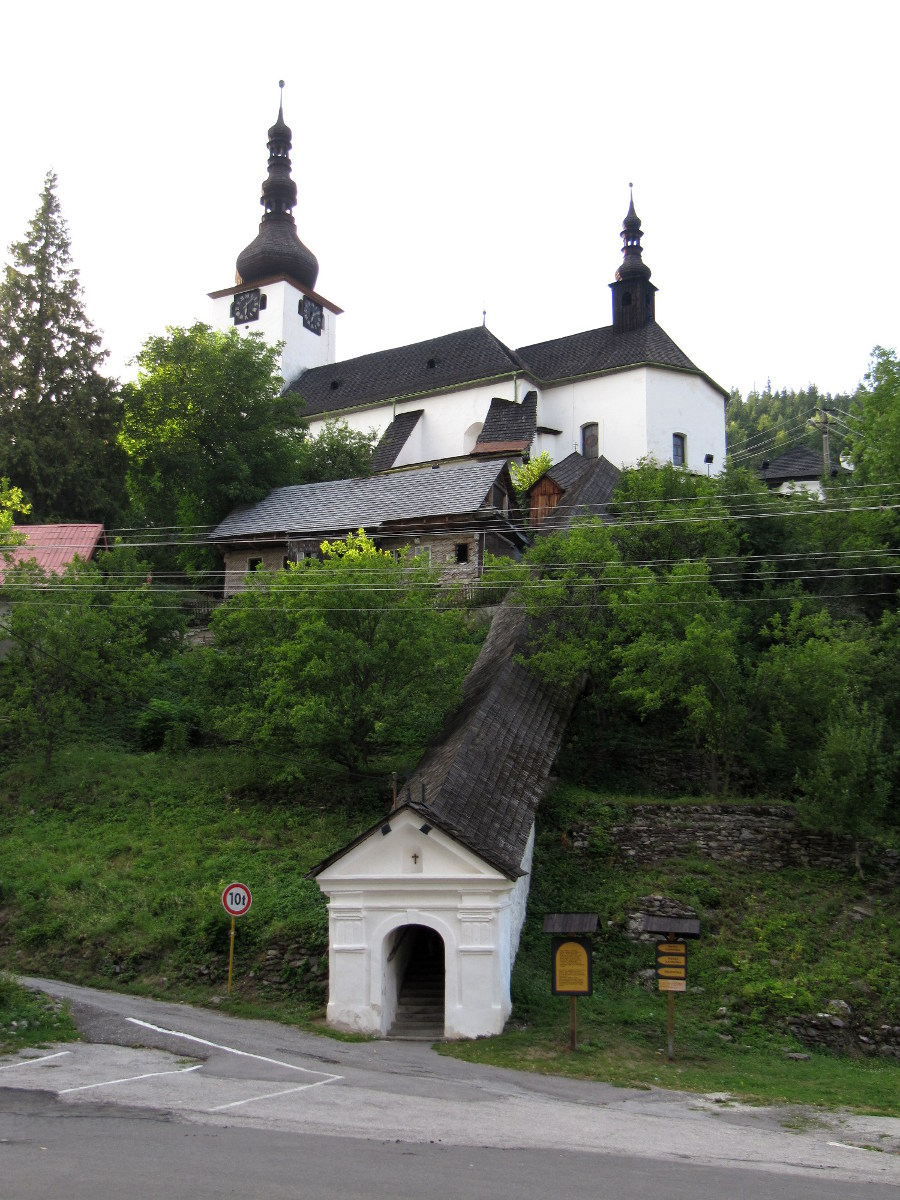
Catholic church and covered stairway leading to it

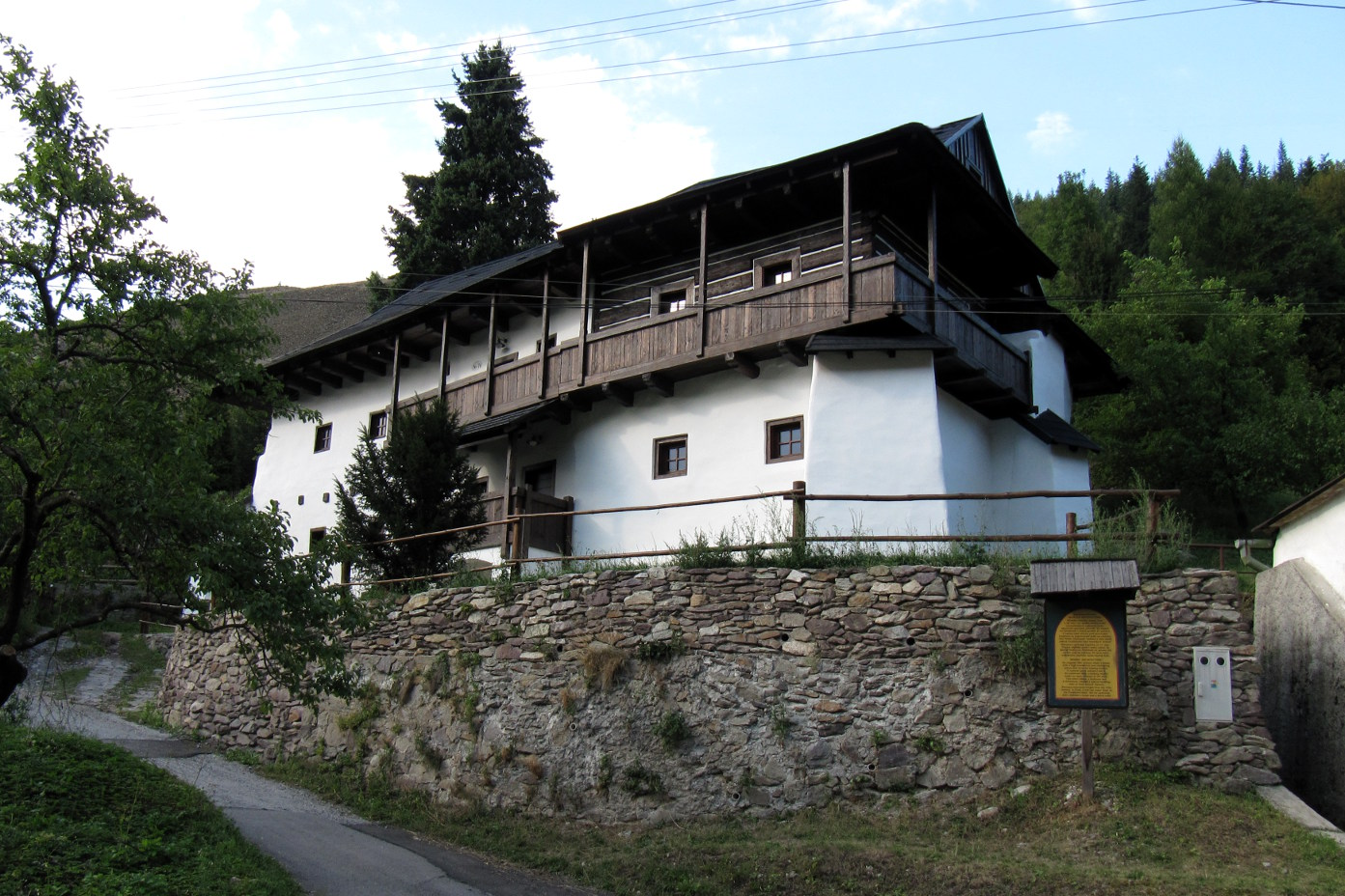
A minershouse

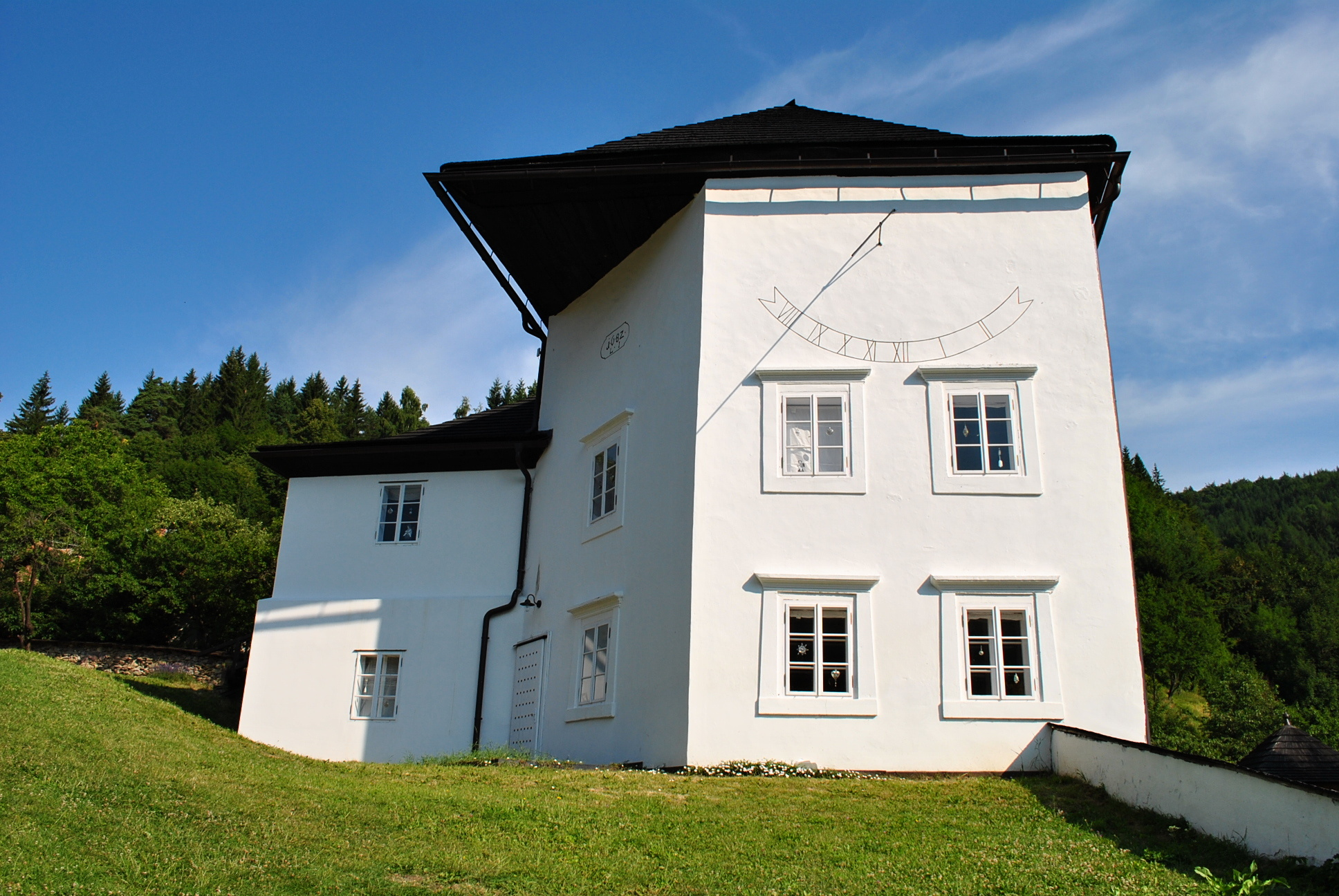
Bastion, a part of the former defense system around the settlement, built in 1644

Prehistoric mining tools excavated in the territory of Špania Dolina have been dated from as early as 2000-1700 BC. Copper from Špania Dolina has also been identified in bronze artifacts from the Balkans and the Middle East. It indicates that the local mines were part of an extensive network of trade routes during the Bronze Age. However, the first written reference to the village itself only appeared in 1254. Abundant deposits of copper and silver were exploited first by miners from Banská Bystrica and after 1494 by one of the first multinational corporations, founded by the affluent Fugger and Thurzo families.

The rich region attracted many foreign visitors. The House of Fugger funded a laboratory of the famous alchemist Paracelsus there. In 1696, Edward Browne gave description of the mine of Herrengrund (Browne used the German name of the settlement), belonged that time to the Hungarian Kingdom, in his book: Brief account of some travels in Hungaria, Servia, Bulgaria, Macedonia, Thessaly, Austria, Styria, Carinthia, and Friuli. He mentions the very rich ore, „in an hundred ponds of Ore they ordinarily find twenty ponds of Copper”. Browne sent some ore to the prominent English naturalist, John Woodward, these are now in his collection in Sedgwick Museum of Earth Sciences, Cambridge. The prominent French thinker Montesquieu visited and described the copper mines in Špania Dolina upon the encouragement of Isaac Newton.

The ancient tradition of making bobbin lace led to the establishment of a bobbin lace craft school in 1883. The copper mines were closed down in 1888 and the economy of the village is now based primarily on tourism.

== Landmarks ==
A covered stairway leads to a fortified church, built in the Gothic and Renaissance styles. Wooden miners' houses, now reconstructed, were originally built in the 17th and 18th centuries. The so-called "Knocker" from the 16th century served as a special bell tower for calling the miners to work in the morning. Ancient shafts and other technical monuments are scattered in the nearby forests. Špania Dolina is also a hub of hiking, mountain biking, and cross-country skiing trails.

== Population ==
Population statistic (10 years)
Year	1995	2005	2015	2025
Count	131	182	200	237
Difference		+38.93%	+9.89%	+18.5%

Population statistic
Year	2024	2025
Count	234	237
Difference		+1.28%

It has a population of 237 people (31 December 2025).

=== Ethnicity ===
Census 2021 (1+ %)
Ethnicity	Number	Fraction
Slovak	205	91.92%
Not found out	10	4.48%
Czech	4	1.79%
Total	223	

In year 2021 was 223 people by ethnicity 205 as Slovak, 10 as Not found out, 4 as Czech, 2 as Polish, 2 as Other, 1 as Italian, 1 as Rusyn, 1 as German, 1 as Moravian and 1 as Hungarian.

Note on population: The difference values of population numbers in the table "Population statistic" and in the sections "Ethnicity" & "Religion" is caused by the use of various statistical methods.

=== Religion ===
Census 2021 (1+ %)
Religion	Number	Fraction
Roman Catholic Church	114	51.12%
None	68	30.49%
Not found out	11	4.93%
Evangelical Church	11	4.93%
Baptists Church	4	1.79%
Other and not ascertained christian church	3	1.35%
Total	223	

In year 2021 was 223 people by religion 114 from Roman Catholic Church, 68 from None, 11 from Not found out, 11 from Evangelical Church, 4 from Baptists Church, 3 from Other and not ascertained christian church, 2 from Paganism and natural spirituality, 2 from Other, 2 from Church of the Brethren, 2 from Ad hoc movements, 1 from Hinduism, 1 from Greek Catholic Church, 1 from Czechoslovak Hussite Church and 1 from Buddhism.

Špania Dolina has only 192 residents (as of December 31, 2013). According to the 2001 census, 95.3% of inhabitants were Slovaks and 3% Czechs. The religious makeup was 82.8% Roman Catholics and 10.7% people with no religious affiliation.
