= Staré Hory Mountains =

Mountain range in Central Slovakia

Coordinates: 48°50′N 19°12′E

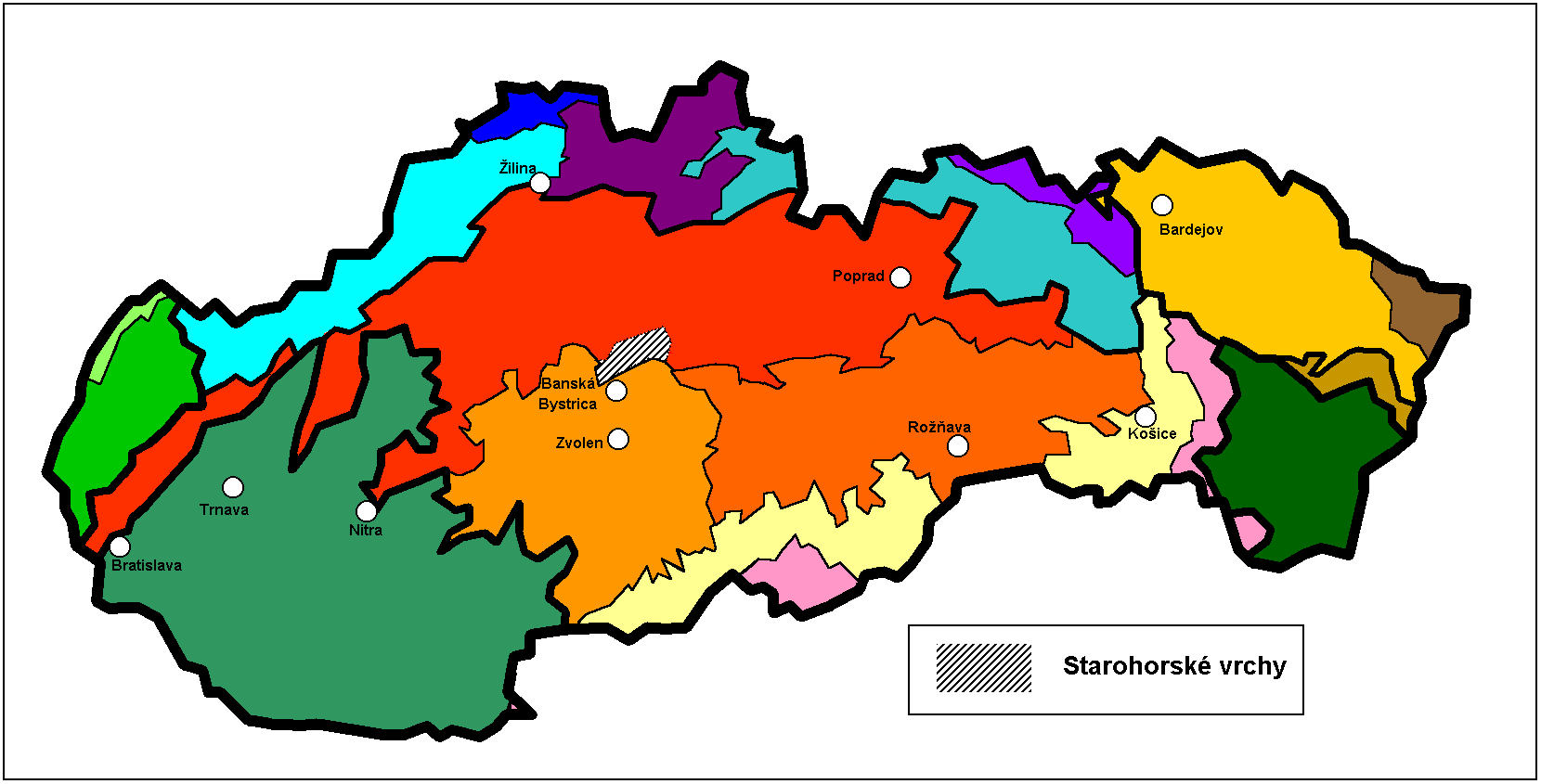
Staré Hory Mountains on the geological map of Slovakia

The Staré Hory Mountains (Slovak: Starohorské vrchy) is a small mountain range in Central Slovakia, near the town of Banská Bystrica. It is a part of the Low Tatra, which is part of the Fatra-Tatra Area and the Inner Western Carpathians. The mountain range is named after the village of Staré Hory (literally Old Mountains).

It borders the Veľká Fatra Mts. in the north west and north, Low Tatra in the east, Zvolen Basin in the south and the Kremnica Mountains in the west.

Points of interest include: the villages of Špania Dolina and Donovaly and the Harmanec Cave.
