= Liptovské Matiašovce =

- Municipality
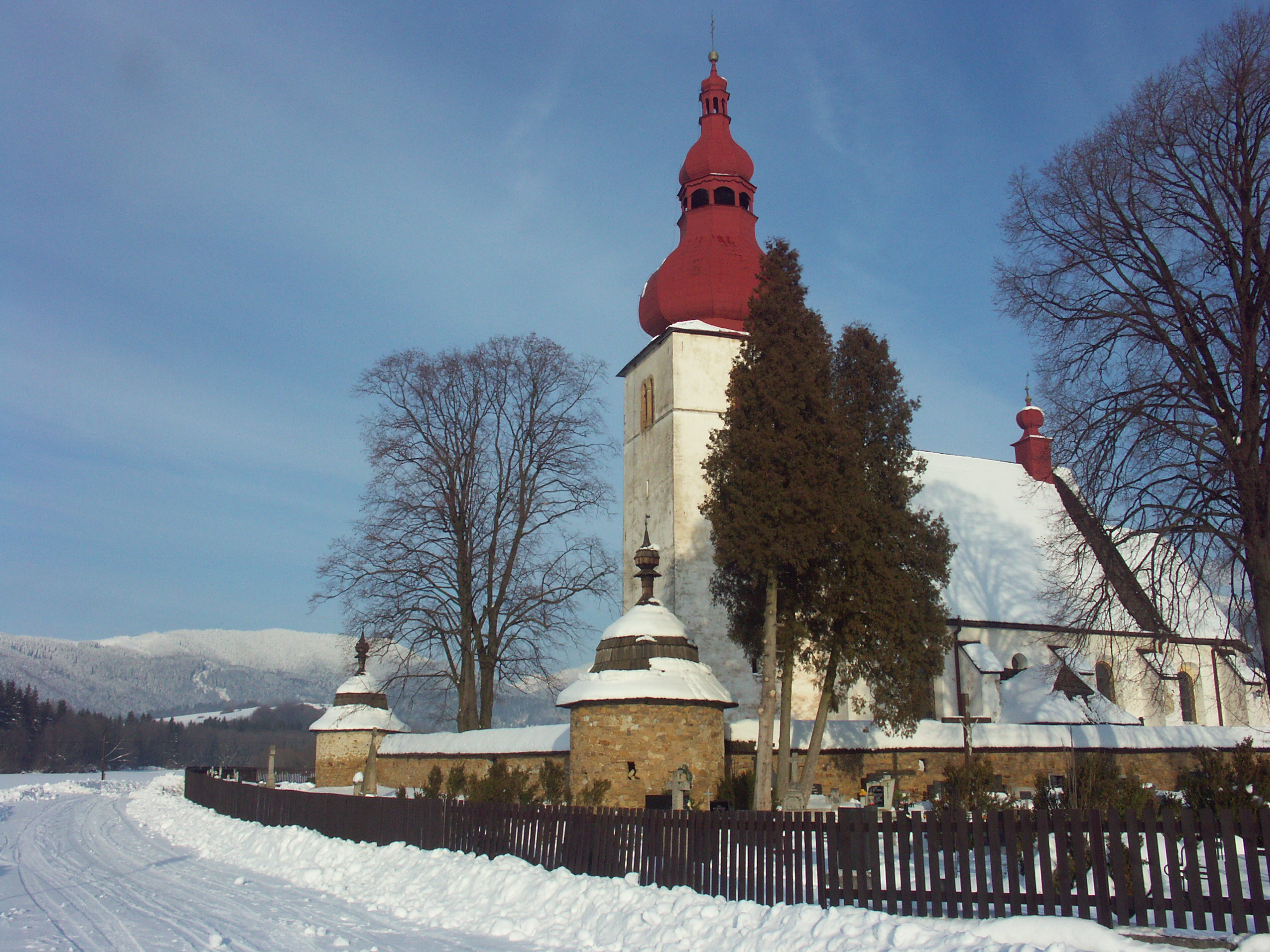
- Saint Ladislaus Church

- Flag

- Location of Liptovské Matiašovce in the Žilina Region Location of Liptovské Matiašovce in Slovakia
- Coordinates: 49.17°N 19.57°E
- Country: Slovakia
- Region: Žilina Region
- District: Liptovský Mikuláš District
- First mentioned: 1416

Area
  - Total: 5.73 km^{2} (2.21 sq mi)
- Elevation: 648 m (2,126 ft)

Population (2025)
  - Total: 327
- Time zone: UTC+1 (CET)
  - Summer (DST): UTC+2 (CEST)
- Postal code: 322 4
- Area code: +421 44
- Vehicle registration plate (until 2022): LM
- Website: www.obecliptovskematiasovce.sk

Liptovské Matiašovce (Slovak: [ˈliptɔwskeː ˈmaciɐʂɔwtse]; Hungarian: Mattyasóc) is a village and municipality in Liptovský Mikuláš District in the Žilina Region of northern Slovakia.

== History ==
In historical records the village was first mentioned in 1416. Before the establishment of independent Czechoslovakia in 1918, it was part of Liptó County within the Kingdom of Hungary. From 1939 to 1945, it was part of the Slovak Republic.

== Geography ==
The municipality lies at an altitude of 648 metres (2,126 ft) and covers an area of 5.73 km^{2} (2.21 sq mi) (2025).

== Population ==
Population statistic (10 years)
Year	1995	2005	2015	2025
Count	308	284	308	327
Difference		−7.79%	+8.45%	+6.16%

Population statistic
Year	2024	2025
Count	321	327
Difference		+1.86%

It has a population of 327 people (31 December 2025).

=== Ethnicity ===
Census 2021 (1+ %)
Ethnicity	Number	Fraction
Slovak	312	99.36%
Not found out	10	3.18%
Total	314	

In year 2021 was 314 people by ethnicity 312 as Slovak, 10 as Not found out and 1 as Czech.

Note on population: The difference values of population numbers in the table "Population statistic" and in the sections "Ethnicity" & "Religion" is caused by the use of various statistical methods.

=== Religion ===
Census 2021 (1+ %)
Religion	Number	Fraction
Roman Catholic Church	268	85.35%
None	32	10.19%
Evangelical Church	7	2.23%
Total	314	

In year 2021 was 314 people by religion 268 from Roman Catholic Church, 32 from None, 7 from Evangelical Church, 3 from Not found out, 1 from Old Catholic Church, 1 from Other and not ascertained christian church, 1 from Christian Congregations in Slovakia and 1 from Greek Catholic Church.
