= Gôtovany =

Village and municipality in Slovakia

- Municipality
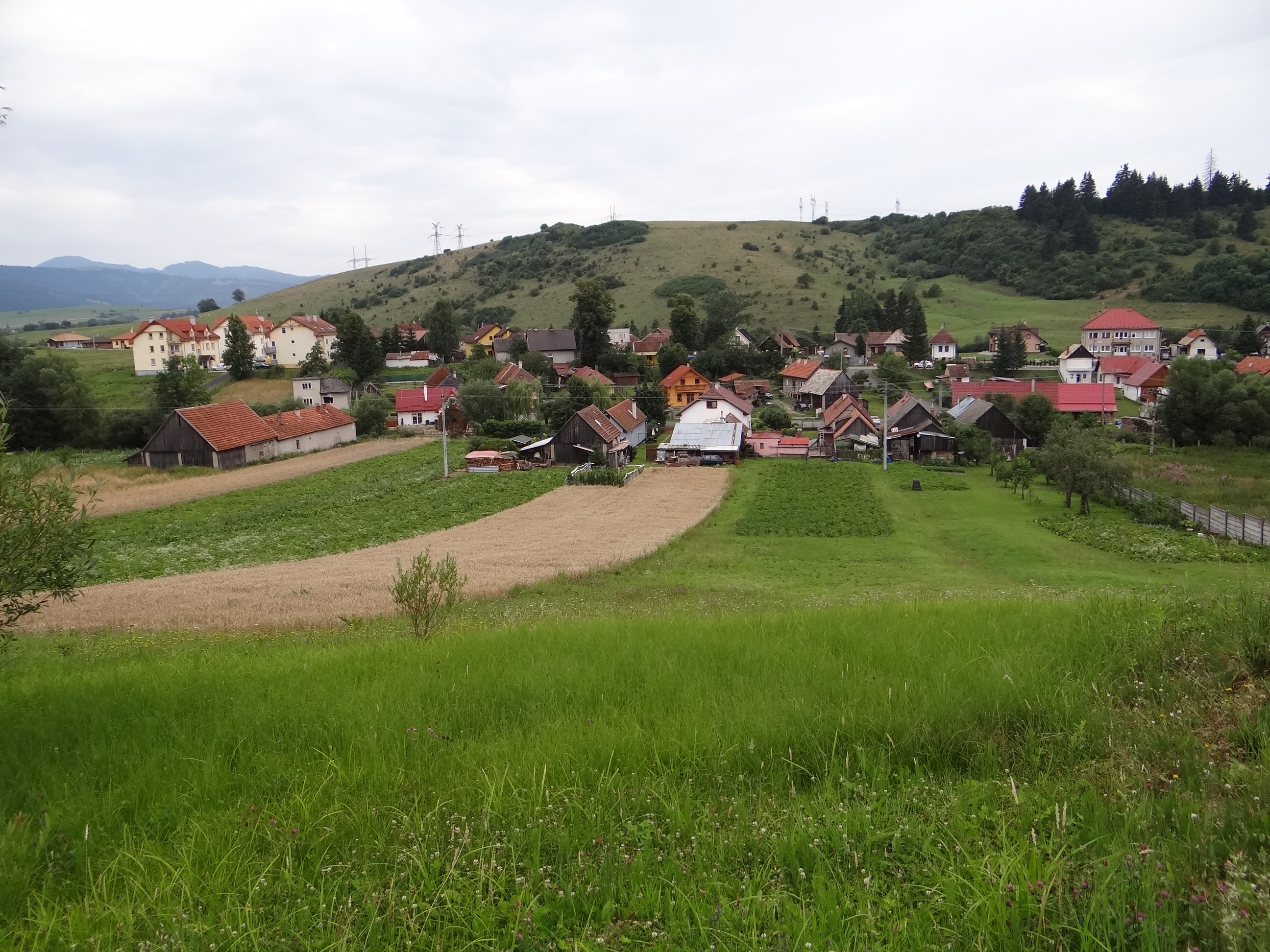

- Flag

- Location of Gôtovany in the Žilina Region Location of Gôtovany in Slovakia
- Coordinates: 49.07°N 19.50°E
- Country: Slovakia
- Region: Žilina Region
- District: Liptovský Mikuláš District
- First mentioned: 1355

Area
  - Total: 2.91 km^{2} (1.12 sq mi)
- Elevation: 587 m (1,926 ft)

Population (2025)
  - Total: 513
- Time zone: UTC+1 (CET)
  - Summer (DST): UTC+2 (CEST)
- Postal code: 321 3
- Area code: +421 44
- Vehicle registration plate (until 2022): LM
- Website: www.gotovany.sk

Gôtovany (Hungarian: Guotfalu) is a village and municipality in Liptovský Mikuláš District in the Žilina Region of northern Slovakia.

== History ==
In historical records the village was first mentioned in 1355. Before the establishment of independent Czechoslovakia in 1918, it was part of Liptó County within the Kingdom of Hungary. From 1939 to 1945, it was part of the Slovak Republic.

== Geography ==
The municipality lies at an altitude of 587 metres (1,926 ft) and covers an area of 2.91 km^{2} (1.12 sq mi) (2025).

== Population ==
Population statistic (10 years)
| Year | 1995 | 2005 | 2015 | 2025 |
|---|---|---|---|---|
| Count | 370 | 391 | 444 | 513 |
| Difference | | +5.67% | +13.55% | +15.54% |

Population statistic
| Year | 2024 | 2025 |
|---|---|---|
| Count | 511 | 513 |
| Difference | | +0.39% |

It has a population of 513 people (31 December 2025).

=== Ethnicity ===
Census 2021 (1+ %)
| Ethnicity | Number | Fraction |
|---|---|---|
| Slovak | 452 | 95.96% |
| Not found out | 11 | 2.33% |
| Czech | 5 | 1.06% |
| Total | 471 | |

In year 2021 was 471 people by ethnicity 452 as Slovak, 11 as Not found out, 5 as Czech, 2 as Ukrainian, 2 as Romani, 1 as Rusyn, 1 as Russian, 1 as German, 1 as Hungarian, 1 as Other and 1 as Greek.

Note on population: The difference values of population numbers in the table "Population statistic" and in the sections "Ethnicity" & "Religion" is caused by the use of various statistical methods.

=== Religion ===
Census 2021 (1+ %)
| Religion | Number | Fraction |
|---|---|---|
| Evangelical Church | 207 | 43.95% |
| Roman Catholic Church | 135 | 28.66% |
| None | 101 | 21.44% |
| Not found out | 10 | 2.12% |
| Greek Catholic Church | 6 | 1.27% |
| Total | 471 | |

In year 2021 was 471 people by religion 207 from Evangelical Church, 135 from Roman Catholic Church, 101 from None, 10 from Not found out, 6 from Greek Catholic Church, 3 from Eastern Orthodox Church, 3 from Baptists Church, 2 from Jehovah's Witnesses, 2 from United Methodist Church, 1 from Christian Congregations in Slovakia and 1 from Ad hoc movements.

== Genealogical resources ==
The records for genealogical research are available at the state archive "Statny Archiv in Bytca, Slovakia"

- Roman Catholic church records (births/marriages/deaths): 1725-1896 (parish B)

== See also ==
- List of municipalities and towns in Slovakia
