= Liptovské Kľačany =

Village and municipality in Slovakia

- Municipality
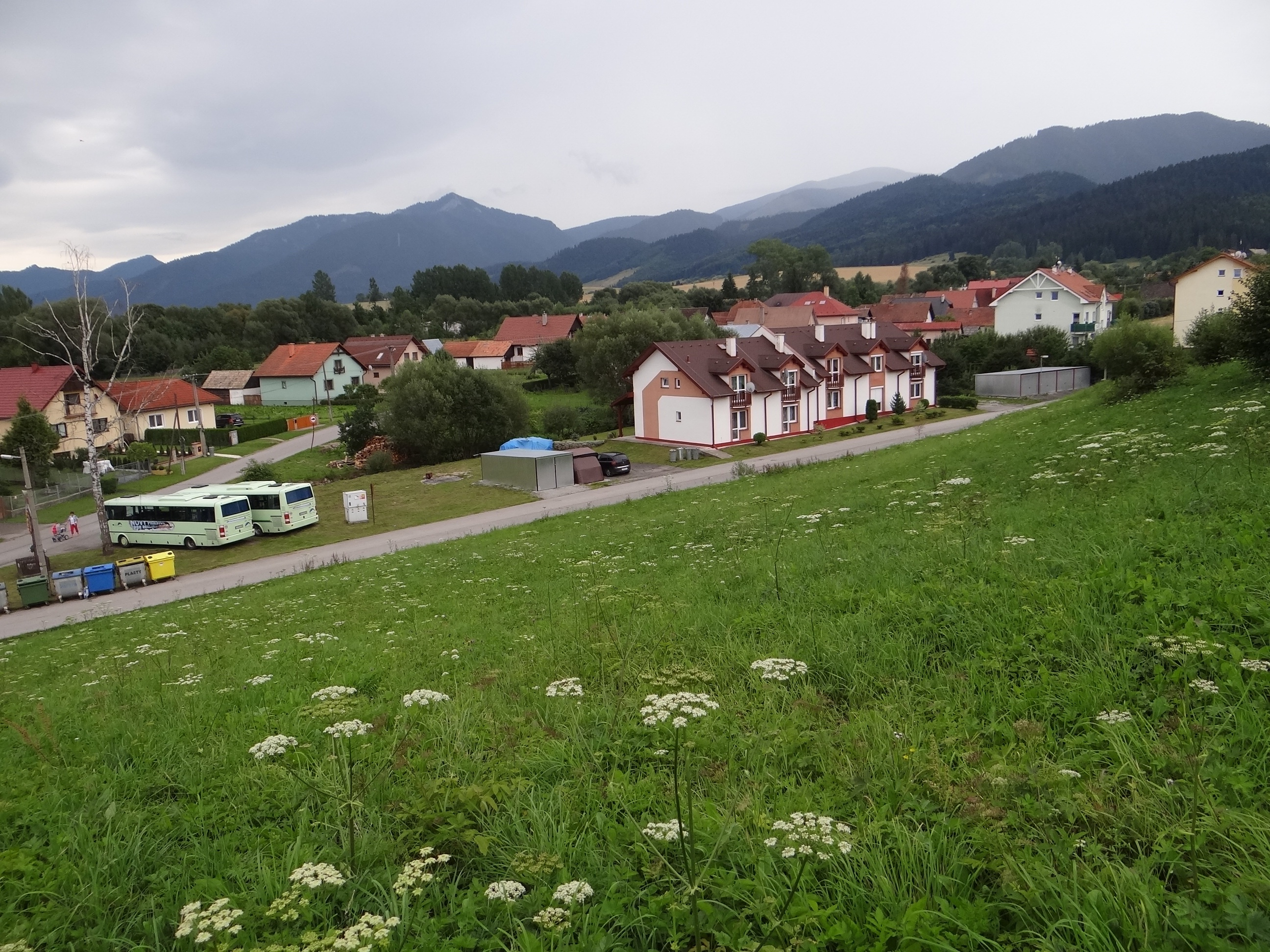

- Flag

- Location of Liptovské Kľačany in the Žilina Region Location of Liptovské Kľačany in Slovakia
- Coordinates: 49.03°N 19.48°E
- Country: Slovakia
- Region: Žilina Region
- District: Liptovský Mikuláš District
- First mentioned: 1474

Area
  - Total: 13.41 km^{2} (5.18 sq mi)
- Elevation: 668 m (2,192 ft)

Population (2025)
  - Total: 389
- Time zone: UTC+1 (CET)
  - Summer (DST): UTC+2 (CEST)
- Postal code: 348 1
- Area code: +421 44
- Vehicle registration plate (until 2022): LM
- Website: liptovskeklacany.sk

Liptovské Kľačany (Slovak: [ˈliptɔwskeː ˈkʎatʂani]; Hungarian: Kelecsén) is a village and municipality in Liptovský Mikuláš District in the Žilina Region of northern Slovakia.

== History ==
In historical records the village was first mentioned in 1474. Before the establishment of independent Czechoslovakia in 1918, it was part of Liptó County within the Kingdom of Hungary. From 1939 to 1945, it was part of the Slovak Republic.

== Geography ==
The municipality lies at an altitude of 668 metres (2,192 ft) and covers an area of 13.41 km^{2} (5.18 sq mi) (2025).

== Population ==
Population statistic (10 years)
Year	1995	2005	2015	2025
Count	300	359	389	389
Difference		+19.66%	+8.35%	+0%

Population statistic
Year	2024	2025
Count	379	389
Difference		+2.63%

It has a population of 389 people (31 December 2025).

=== Ethnicity ===
Census 2021 (1+ %)
Ethnicity	Number	Fraction
Slovak	367	97.08%
Not found out	15	3.96%
Russian	4	1.05%
Total	378	

In year 2021 was 378 people by ethnicity 367 as Slovak, 15 as Not found out, 4 as Russian and 2 as German.

Note on population: The difference values of population numbers in the table "Population statistic" and in the sections "Ethnicity" & "Religion" is caused by the use of various statistical methods.

=== Religion ===
Census 2021 (1+ %)
Religion	Number	Fraction
Roman Catholic Church	285	75.4%
None	51	13.49%
Evangelical Church	25	6.61%
Not found out	9	2.38%
Other	5	1.32%
Total	378	

In year 2021 was 378 people by religion 285 from Roman Catholic Church, 51 from None, 25 from Evangelical Church, 9 from Not found out, 5 from Other, 1 from Eastern Orthodox Church, 1 from Greek Catholic Church and 1 from Ad hoc movements.
