= Liptovský Trnovec =

Village and municipality in Slovakia

- Municipality
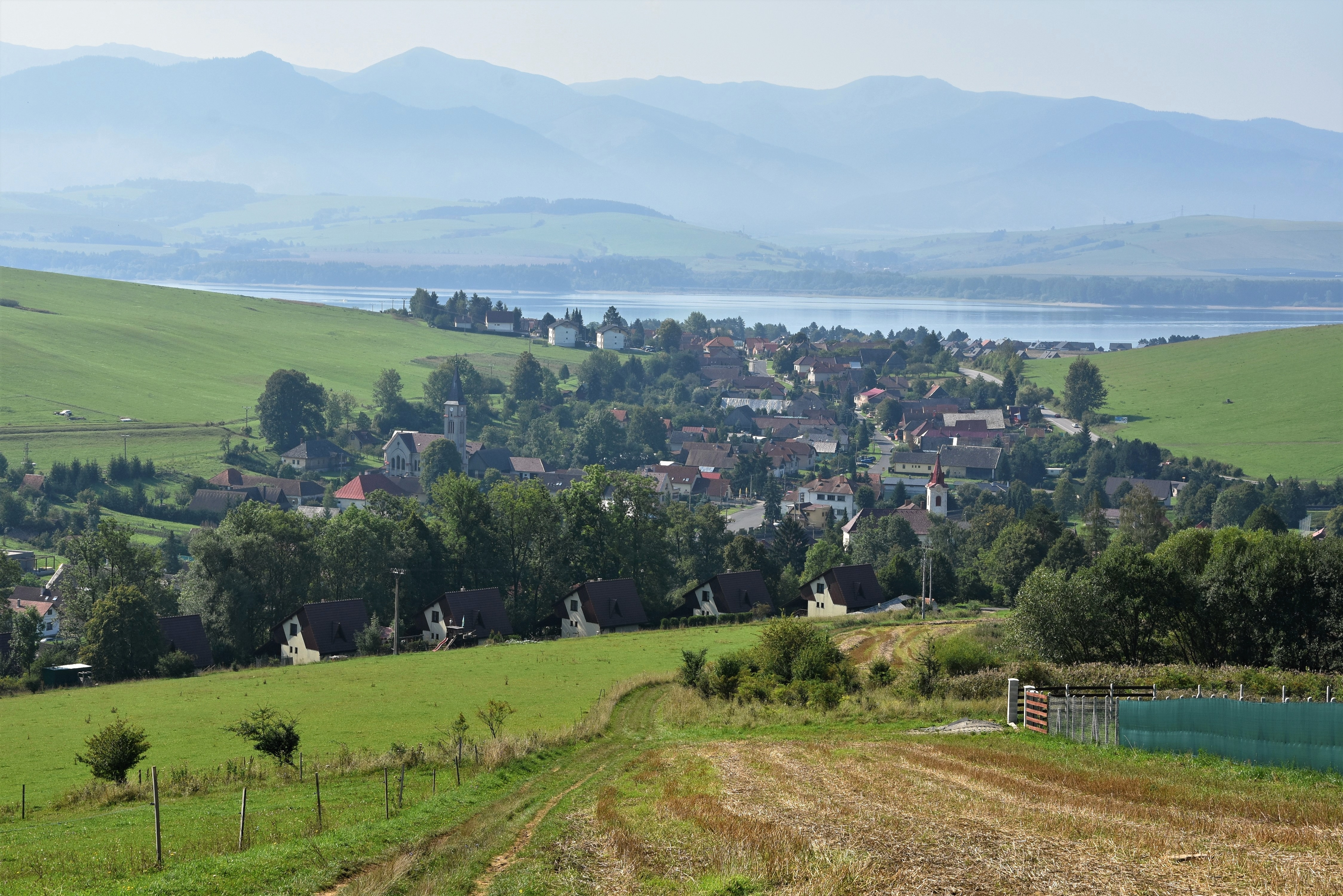

- Flag

- Location of Liptovský Trnovec in the Žilina Region Location of Liptovský Trnovec in Slovakia
- Coordinates: 49.12°N 19.55°E
- Country: Slovakia
- Region: Žilina Region
- District: Liptovský Mikuláš District
- First mentioned: 1283

Area
  - Total: 27.45 km^{2} (10.60 sq mi)
- Elevation: 588 m (1,929 ft)

Population (2025)
  - Total: 639
- Time zone: UTC+1 (CET)
  - Summer (DST): UTC+2 (CEST)
- Postal code: 322 2
- Area code: +421 44
- Vehicle registration plate (until 2022): LM
- Website: www.liptovskytrnovec.eu

Liptovský Trnovec (Slovak: [ˈliptɔwskiː ˈtr̩nɔʋets]; Hungarian: Tarnóc) is a village and municipality in Liptovský Mikuláš District in the Žilina Region of northern Slovakia.

== History ==
In historical records the village was first mentioned in 1283. Before the establishment of independent Czechoslovakia in 1918, it was part of Liptó County within the Kingdom of Hungary. From 1939 to 1945, it was part of the Slovak Republic.

== Geography ==
The municipality lies at an altitude of 588 metres (1,929 ft) and covers an area of 27.45 km^{2} (10.60 sq mi) (2025).

== Population ==
Population statistic (10 years)
Year	1995	2005	2015	2025
Count	557	539	557	639
Difference		−3.23%	+3.33%	+14.72%

Population statistic
Year	2024	2025
Count	633	639
Difference		+0.94%

It has a population of 639 people (31 December 2025).

=== Ethnicity ===
Census 2021 (1+ %)
Ethnicity	Number	Fraction
Slovak	544	93.31%
Not found out	37	6.34%
Czech	9	1.54%
Total	583	

In year 2021 was 583 people by ethnicity 544 as Slovak, 37 as Not found out, 9 as Czech, 4 as Austrian, 3 as Other, 1 as Ukrainian, 1 as Silesian, 1 as Russian, 1 as Polish and 1 as Hungarian.

Note on population: The difference values of population numbers in the table "Population statistic" and in the sections "Ethnicity" & "Religion" is caused by the use of various statistical methods.

=== Religion ===
Census 2021 (1+ %)
Religion	Number	Fraction
Roman Catholic Church	199	34.13%
Evangelical Church	189	32.42%
None	147	25.21%
Not found out	36	6.17%
Total	583	

In year 2021 was 583 people by religion 199 from Roman Catholic Church, 189 from Evangelical Church, 147 from None, 36 from Not found out, 5 from Christian Congregations in Slovakia, 3 from Other, 2 from Greek Catholic Church, 1 from United Methodist Church and 1 from Ad hoc movements.
