= Veľké Borové =

- Municipality
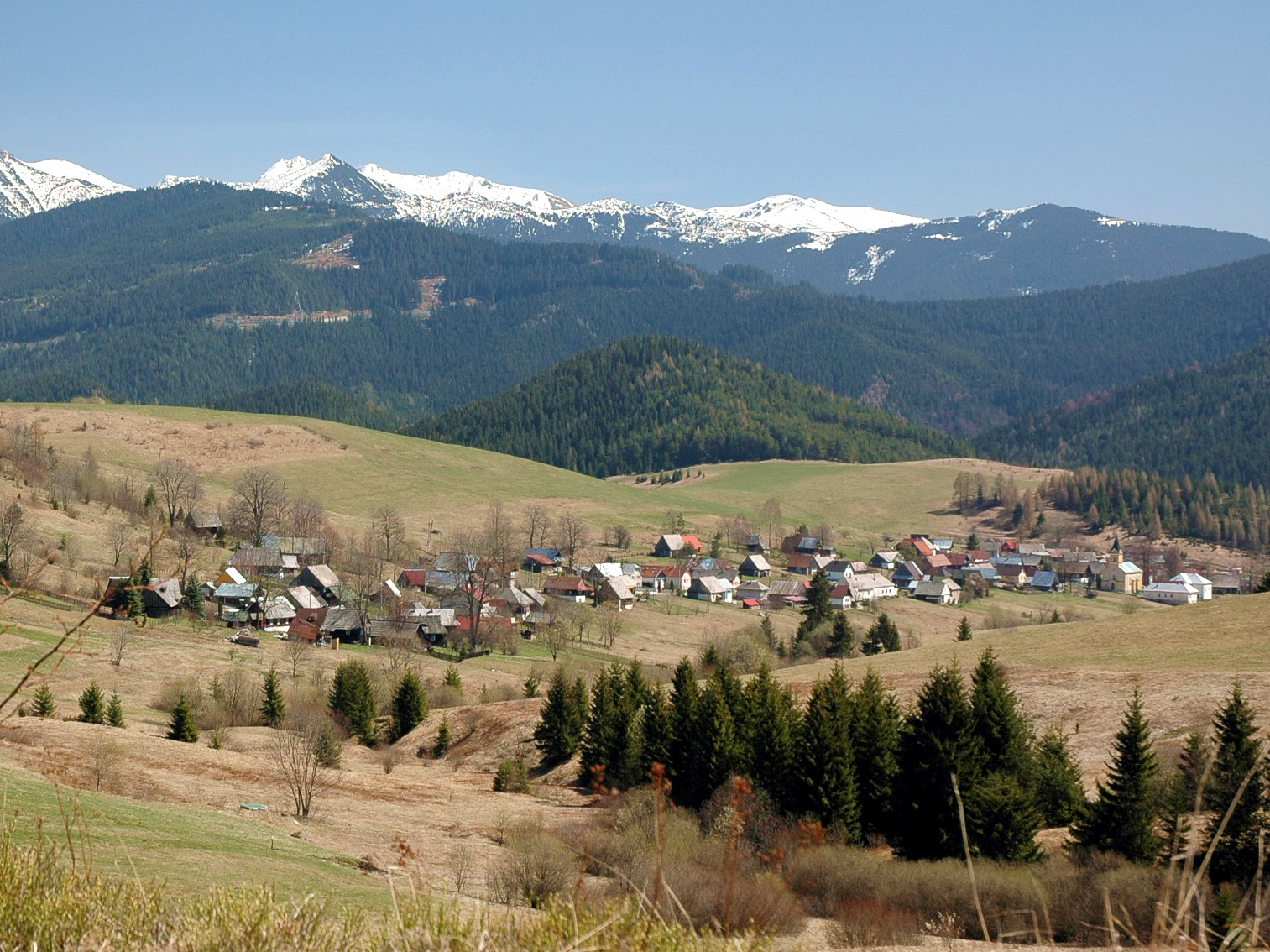

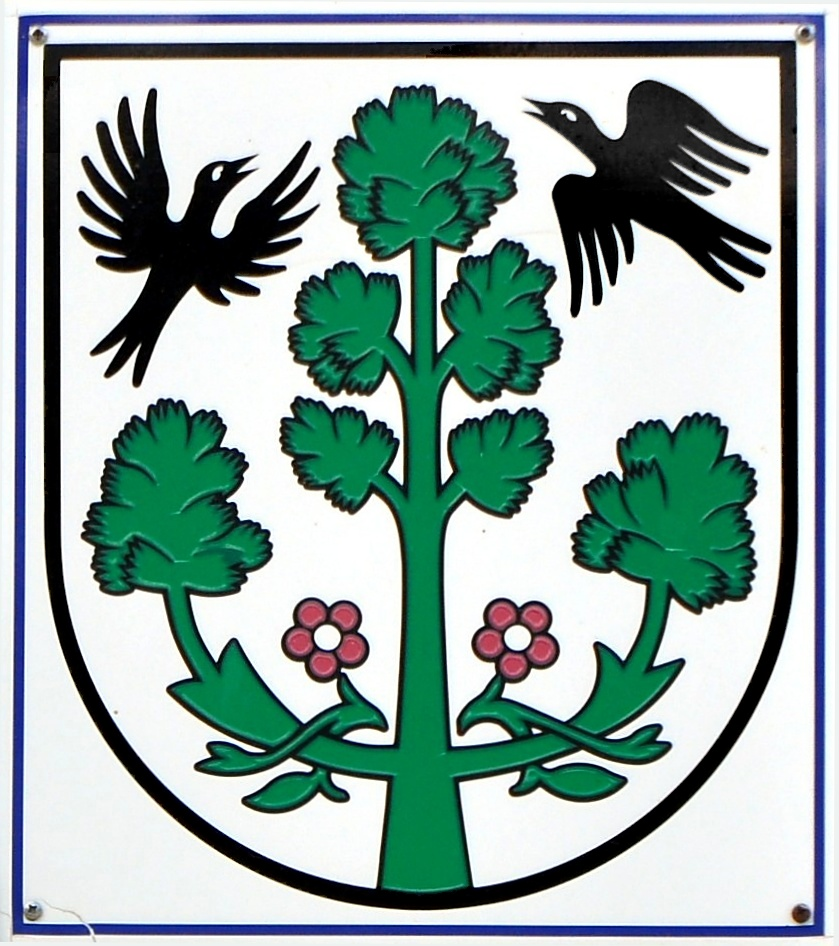
- Flag Coat of arms

- Location of Veľké Borové in the Žilina Region Location of Veľké Borové in Slovakia
- Coordinates: 49.20°N 19.53°E
- Country: Slovakia
- Region: Žilina Region
- District: Liptovský Mikuláš District
- First mentioned: 1646

Area
  - Total: 10.98 km^{2} (4.24 sq mi)
- Elevation: 835 m (2,740 ft)

Population (2025)
  - Total: 40
- Time zone: UTC+1 (CET)
  - Summer (DST): UTC+2 (CEST)
- Postal code: 274 6
- Area code: +421 44
- Vehicle registration plate (until 2022): LM
- Website: www.velke-borove.sk

Veľké Borové (Hungarian: Nagyborove, Polish: Wielkie Borowe) is a village and municipality in Liptovský Mikuláš District in the Žilina Region of northern Slovakia.

== History ==
In historical records the village was first mentioned in 1646. Before the establishment of independent Czechoslovakia in 1918, it was part of Liptó County within the Kingdom of Hungary. In the 1880s, it had a population 670, Polish and Slovak by ethnicity. From 1939 to 1945, it was part of the Slovak Republic.

== Geography ==
The municipality lies at an altitude of 835 metres (2,740 ft) and covers an area of 10.98 km^{2} (4.24 sq mi) (2025).

== Population ==
Population statistic (10 years)
Year	1995	2005	2015	2025
Count	104	78	53	40
Difference		−25%	−32.05%	−24.52%

Population statistic
Year	2024	2025
Count	42	40
Difference		−4.76%

It has a population of 40 people (31 December 2025).

=== Ethnicity ===
Census 2021 (1+ %)
Ethnicity	Number	Fraction
Slovak	39	97.5%
Not found out	1	2.5%
Total	40	

In year 2021 was 40 people by ethnicity 39 as Slovak and 1 as Not found out.

Note on population: The difference values of population numbers in the table "Population statistic" and in the sections "Ethnicity" & "Religion" is caused by the use of various statistical methods.

=== Religion ===
Census 2021 (1+ %)
Religion	Number	Fraction
Roman Catholic Church	37	92.5%
None	2	5%
Not found out	1	2.5%
Total	40	

In year 2021 was 40 people by religion 37 from Roman Catholic Church, 2 from None and 1 from Not found out.
