= Nižná Boca =

- Municipality
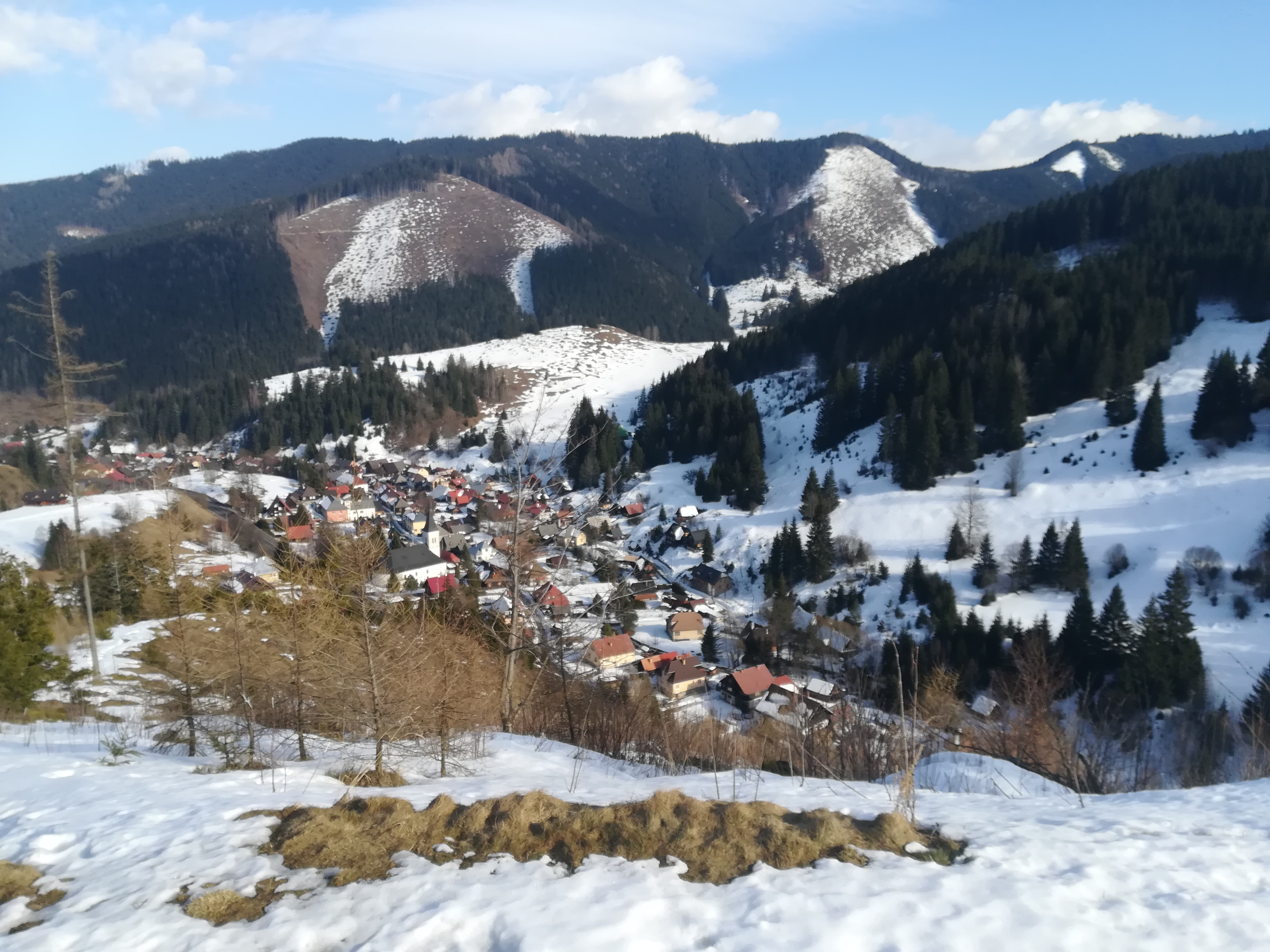

- Flag

- Location of Nižná Boca in the Žilina Region Location of Nižná Boca in Slovakia
- Coordinates: 48.95°N 19.77°E
- Country: Slovakia
- Region: Žilina Region
- District: Liptovský Mikuláš District
- First mentioned: 1350

Government
  - Mayor: Silvia Skusilová

Area
  - Total: 25.17 km^{2} (9.72 sq mi)
- Elevation: 844 m (2,769 ft)

Population (2025)
  - Total: 155
- Time zone: UTC+1 (CET)
  - Summer (DST): UTC+2 (CEST)
- Postal code: 323 4
- Area code: +421 44
- Vehicle registration plate (until 2022): LM
- Website: www.niznaboca.sk

Nižná Boca (Hungarian: Szentivánboca) is a village and municipality in Liptovský Mikuláš District in the Žilina Region of northern Slovakia.

== History ==
In historical records the village was first mentioned in 1285. Nižná Boca Village is situated on both banks of the river Boca. It is surrounded by nearby mountains. The area is situated in a protected area in the Low Tatras National Park.

Near the village are meadows and small rolls. The soil is poor. Potatoes are often harvested as much as inflicted. Under difficult circumstances, planted crops grown are exposed to severe weather conditions.

The population was addressed mainly to cattle and sheep. A special feature is a rarity, even the fact that citizens have cattle for short time next to their homes, as well as directly on grassland in special loghouses - meadow stables. About 50 of these meadow stables can be seen scattered throughout the valley. Some are still functional and in good condition. Efforts is currently underway to rescue the stables.

Vyšná Boca is a little, originally a mining village (altitude 950 m), at the end of the Bocianska dolina (Stork Valley) below Čertovica and Rovná hoľa. It is situated in the Protected Area of the Low Tatras National Park (NAPANT) and is an excellent starting point for the hikes to the Ďumbierske and Kráľovohorské Tatras. In the middle of the 19th century, the village was separated from the former villages Kráľovská and Svätojánska Boca. Meantime it was an administrative part of Nižná Boca. In the past, iron, gold and antimony were mined here, later the inhabitants dealt with agriculture, work in woods and stock-raising. The mining past reminds a chain of big mining houses with courtyard galleries shifting now to holiday cottages. In the village, there is a tolerant church from the year 1785, built at foundations of an older one.

Before the establishment of independent Czechoslovakia in 1918, Nižná Boca was part of Liptó County within the Kingdom of Hungary. From 1939 to 1945, it was part of the Slovak Republic.

== Geography ==
The municipality lies at an altitude of 844 metres (2,769 ft) and covers an area of 25.17 km^{2} (9.72 sq mi) (2025).

== Population ==
Population statistic (10 years)
Year	1995	2005	2015	2025
Count	184	169	162	155
Difference		−8.15%	−4.14%	−4.32%

Population statistic
Year	2024	2025
Count	155	155
Difference		+0%

It has a population of 155 people (31 December 2025).

=== Ethnicity ===
Census 2021 (1+ %)
Ethnicity	Number	Fraction
Slovak	161	98.77%
Czech	2	1.22%
Not found out	2	1.22%
Total	163	

In year 2021 was 163 people by ethnicity 161 as Slovak, 2 as Czech, 2 as Not found out, 1 as Rusyn and 1 as Polish.

Note on population: The difference values of population numbers in the table "Population statistic" and in the sections "Ethnicity" & "Religion" is caused by the use of various statistical methods.

=== Religion ===
Census 2021 (1+ %)
Religion	Number	Fraction
None	71	43.56%
Evangelical Church	58	35.58%
Roman Catholic Church	29	17.79%
Ad hoc movements	3	1.84%
Other and not ascertained christian church	2	1.23%
Total	163	

In year 2021 was 163 people by religion 71 from None, 58 from Evangelical Church, 29 from Roman Catholic Church, 3 from Ad hoc movements and 2 from Other and not ascertained christian church.
