= Žiar, Liptovský Mikuláš District =

Village and municipality in Slovakia

Žiar
- Municipality
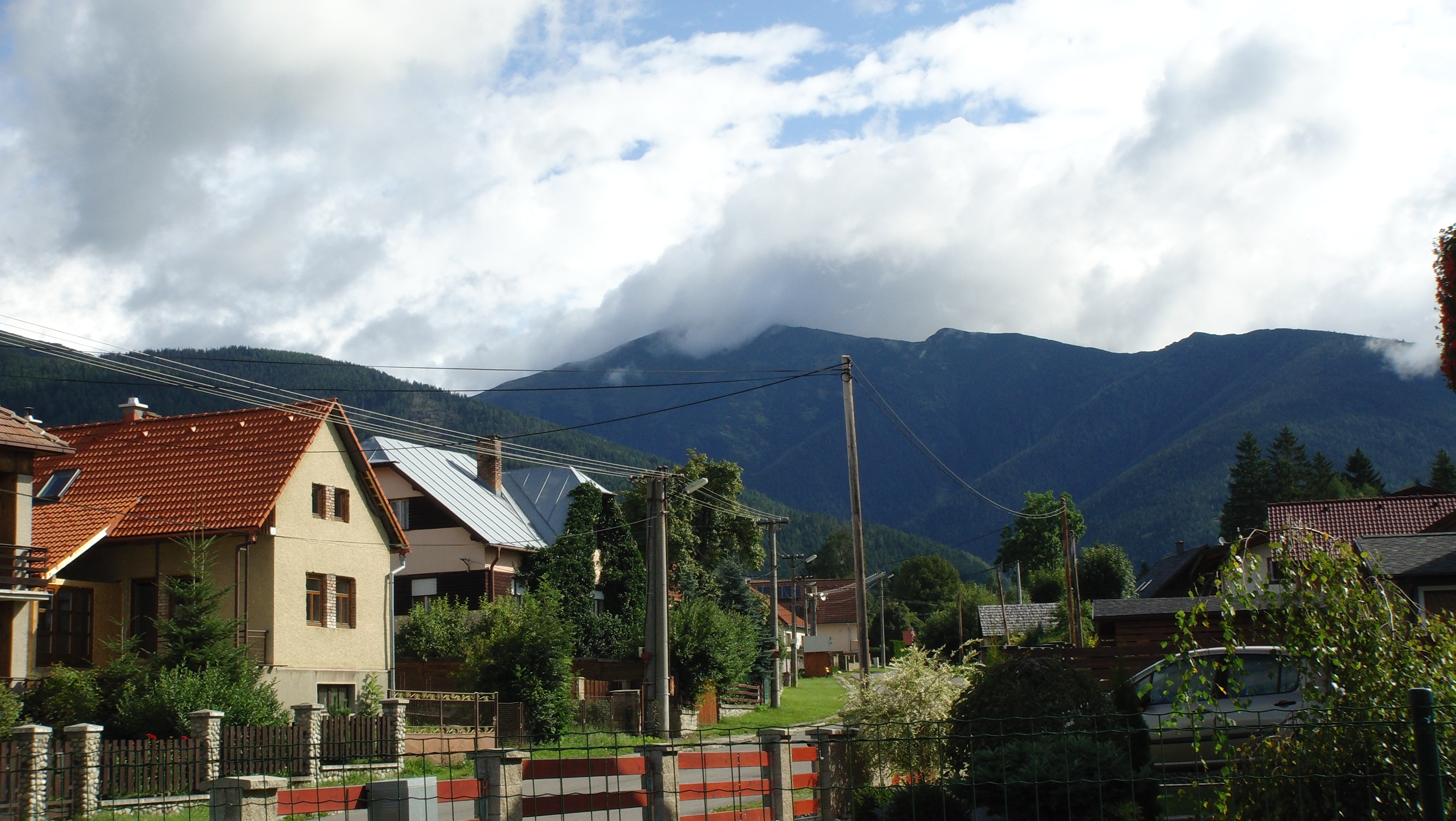

- Flag

- Location of Žiar in the Žilina Region Location of Žiar in Slovakia
- Coordinates: 49°08′N 19°40′E
- Country: Slovakia
- Region: Žilina Region
- District: Liptovský Mikuláš District
- First mentioned: 1349

Area
  - Total: 21.89 km^{2} (8.45 sq mi)
- Elevation: 759 m (2,490 ft)

Population (2025)
  - Total: 486
- Time zone: UTC+1 (CET)
  - Summer (DST): UTC+2 (CEST)
- Postal code: 310 5
- Area code: +421 44
- Vehicle registration plate (until 2022): LM
- Website: www.obecziar.sk

Žiar (Hungarian: Zsár) is a village and municipality in Liptovský Mikuláš District in the Žilina Region of northern Slovakia.

== History ==
In historical records the village was first mentioned in 1349. Before the establishment of independent Czechoslovakia in 1918, it was part of Liptó County within the Kingdom of Hungary. From 1939 to 1945, it was part of the Slovak Republic.

== Geography ==
The municipality lies at an altitude of 759 metres (2,490 ft) and covers an area of 21.89 km^{2} (8.45 sq mi) (2025).

== Population ==
Population statistic (10 years)
Year	1995	2005	2015	2025
Count	418	418	444	486
Difference		+0%	+6.22%	+9.45%

Population statistic
Year	2024	2025
Count	483	486
Difference		+0.62%

It has a population of 486 people (31 December 2025).

=== Ethnicity ===
Census 2021 (1+ %)
Ethnicity	Number	Fraction
Slovak	464	97.27%
Czech	8	1.67%
Russian	5	1.04%
Total	477	

In year 2021 was 477 people by ethnicity 464 as Slovak, 8 as Czech, 5 as Russian, 4 as Other, 3 as Not found out, 2 as Irish, 1 as German, 1 as Hungarian and 1 as Greek.

Note on population: The difference values of population numbers in the table "Population statistic" and in the sections "Ethnicity" & "Religion" is caused by the use of various statistical methods.

=== Religion ===
Census 2021 (1+ %)
Religion	Number	Fraction
Evangelical Church	223	46.75%
Roman Catholic Church	119	24.95%
None	113	23.69%
Other and not ascertained christian church	5	1.05%
Total	477	

In year 2021 was 477 people by religion 223 from Evangelical Church, 119 from Roman Catholic Church, 113 from None, 5 from Other and not ascertained christian church, 4 from Not found out, 4 from Christian Congregations in Slovakia, 4 from Other, 2 from Greek Catholic Church, 1 from Jehovah's Witnesses, 1 from United Methodist Church and 1 from Buddhism.
