= Liptovská Sielnica =

- Municipality
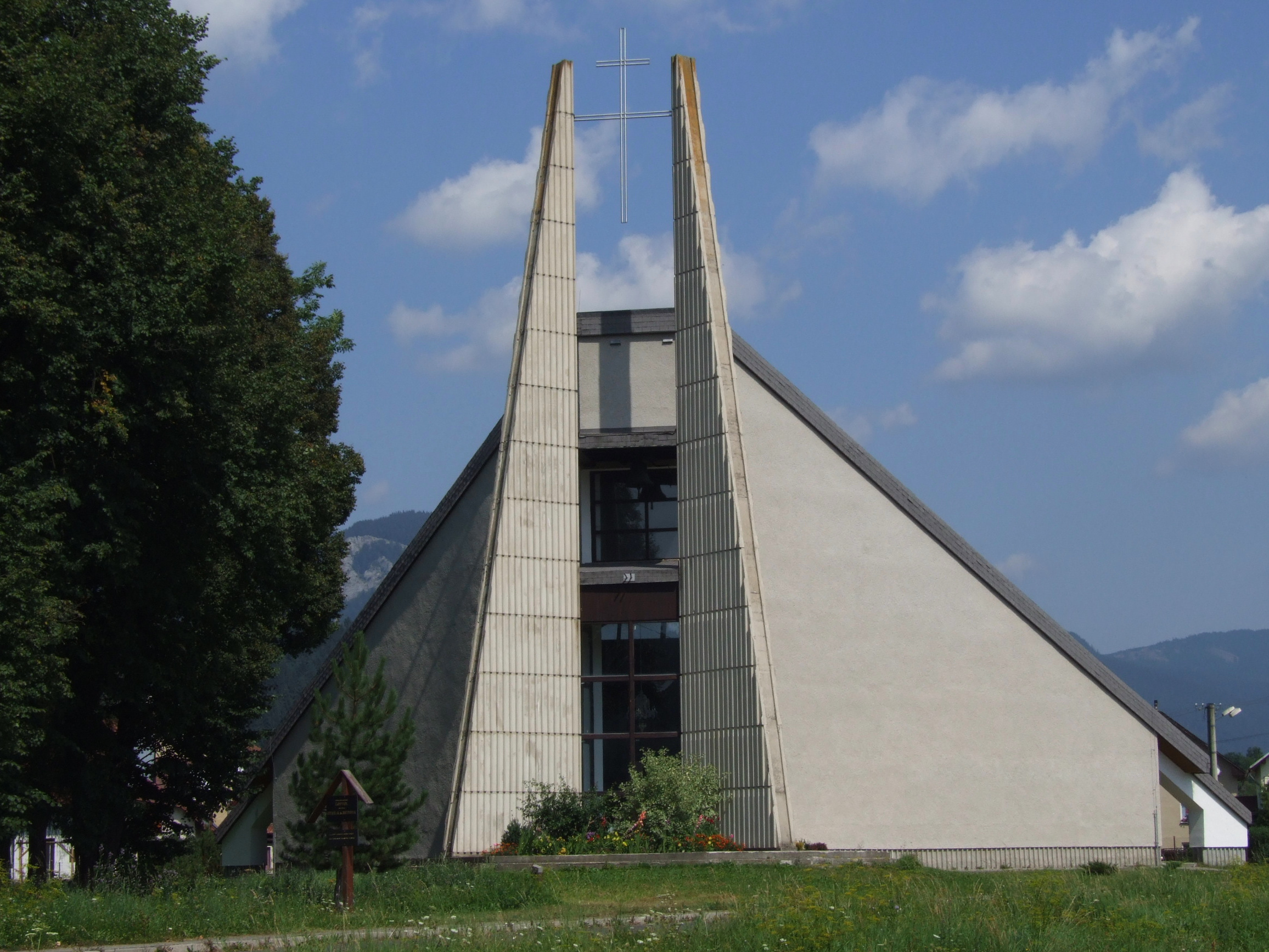
- Church of Saints Cyril and Methodius

- Flag

- Location of Liptovská Sielnica in the Žilina Region Location of Liptovská Sielnica in Slovakia
- Coordinates: 49.13°N 19.52°E
- Country: Slovakia
- Region: Žilina Region
- District: Liptovský Mikuláš District
- First mentioned: 1262

Area
  - Total: 17.25 km^{2} (6.66 sq mi)
- Elevation: 574 m (1,883 ft)

Population (2025)
  - Total: 566
- Time zone: UTC+1 (CET)
  - Summer (DST): UTC+2 (CEST)
- Postal code: 322 3
- Area code: +421 44
- Vehicle registration plate (until 2022): LM
- Website: www.liptovskasielnica.sk

Liptovská Sielnica (Hungarian: Szielnic) is a village and municipality in Liptovský Mikuláš District in the Žilina Region of northern Slovakia.

== History ==
In historical records the village was first mentioned in 1262. Before the establishment of independent Czechoslovakia in 1918, it was part of Liptó County within the Kingdom of Hungary. From 1939 to 1945, it was part of the Slovak Republic.

== Geography ==
The municipality lies at an altitude of 574 metres (1,883 ft) and covers an area of 17.25 km^{2} (6.66 sq mi) (2025).

== Population ==
Population statistic (10 years)
Year	1995	2005	2015	2025
Count	448	622	608	566
Difference		+38.83%	−2.25%	−6.90%

Population statistic
Year	2024	2025
Count	589	566
Difference		−3.90%

It has a population of 566 people (31 December 2025).

=== Ethnicity ===
Census 2021 (1+ %)
Ethnicity	Number	Fraction
Slovak	587	97.02%
Not found out	18	2.97%
Total	605	

In year 2021 was 605 people by ethnicity 587 as Slovak, 18 as Not found out, 5 as Czech, 5 as German and 2 as Rusyn.

Note on population: The difference values of population numbers in the table "Population statistic" and in the sections "Ethnicity" & "Religion" is caused by the use of various statistical methods.

=== Religion ===
Census 2021 (1+ %)
Religion	Number	Fraction
Roman Catholic Church	284	46.94%
None	151	24.96%
Evangelical Church	142	23.47%
Not found out	13	2.15%
Total	605	

In year 2021 was 605 people by religion 284 from Roman Catholic Church, 151 from None, 142 from Evangelical Church, 13 from Not found out, 3 from Paganism and natural spirituality, 3 from Greek Catholic Church, 3 from Church of the Brethren, 3 from Ad hoc movements, 1 from Old Catholic Church, 1 from Calvinist Church and 1 from Eastern Orthodox Church.
