= Malatíny =

- Municipality
- Flag

- Location of Malatíny in the Žilina Region Location of Malatíny in Slovakia
- Coordinates: 49.06°N 19.45°E
- Country: Slovakia
- Region: Žilina Region
- District: Liptovský Mikuláš District
- First mentioned: 1250

Area
  - Total: 4.17 km^{2} (1.61 sq mi)
- Elevation: 553 m (1,814 ft)

Population (2025)
  - Total: 262
- Time zone: UTC+1 (CET)
  - Summer (DST): UTC+2 (CEST)
- Postal code: 321 5
- Area code: +421 44
- Vehicle registration plate (until 2022): LM
- Website: obecmalatiny.sk

Malatíny (Hungarian: Hárommalatin) is a village and municipality in Liptovský Mikuláš District in the Žilina Region of northern Slovakia.

== History ==
In historical records the village was first mentioned in 1250. Before the establishment of independent Czechoslovakia in 1918, it was part of Liptó County within the Kingdom of Hungary. From 1939 to 1945, it was part of the Slovak Republic.

== Geography ==
The municipality lies at an altitude of 553 metres (1,814 ft) and covers an area of 4.17 km^{2} (1.61 sq mi) (2025).

== Population ==
Population statistic (10 years)
Year	1995	2005	2015	2025
Count	155	166	213	262
Difference		+7.09%	+28.31%	+23.00%

Population statistic
Year	2024	2025
Count	259	262
Difference		+1.15%

It has a population of 262 people (31 December 2025).

=== Ethnicity ===
Census 2021 (1+ %)
Ethnicity	Number	Fraction
Slovak	226	92.62%
Not found out	15	6.14%
Czech	3	1.22%
Other	3	1.22%
Total	244	

In year 2021 was 244 people by ethnicity 226 as Slovak, 15 as Not found out, 3 as Czech, 3 as Other and 1 as English.

Note on population: The difference values of population numbers in the table "Population statistic" and in the sections "Ethnicity" & "Religion" is caused by the use of various statistical methods.

=== Religion ===
Census 2021 (1+ %)
Religion	Number	Fraction
Roman Catholic Church	110	45.08%
None	57	23.36%
Evangelical Church	49	20.08%
Not found out	21	8.61%
Baptists Church	4	1.64%
Total	244	

In year 2021 was 244 people by religion 110 from Roman Catholic Church, 57 from None, 49 from Evangelical Church, 21 from Not found out, 4 from Baptists Church, 1 from Other and not ascertained christian church, 1 from United Methodist Church and 1 from Ad hoc movements.
