= Liptovský Ondrej =

- Municipality
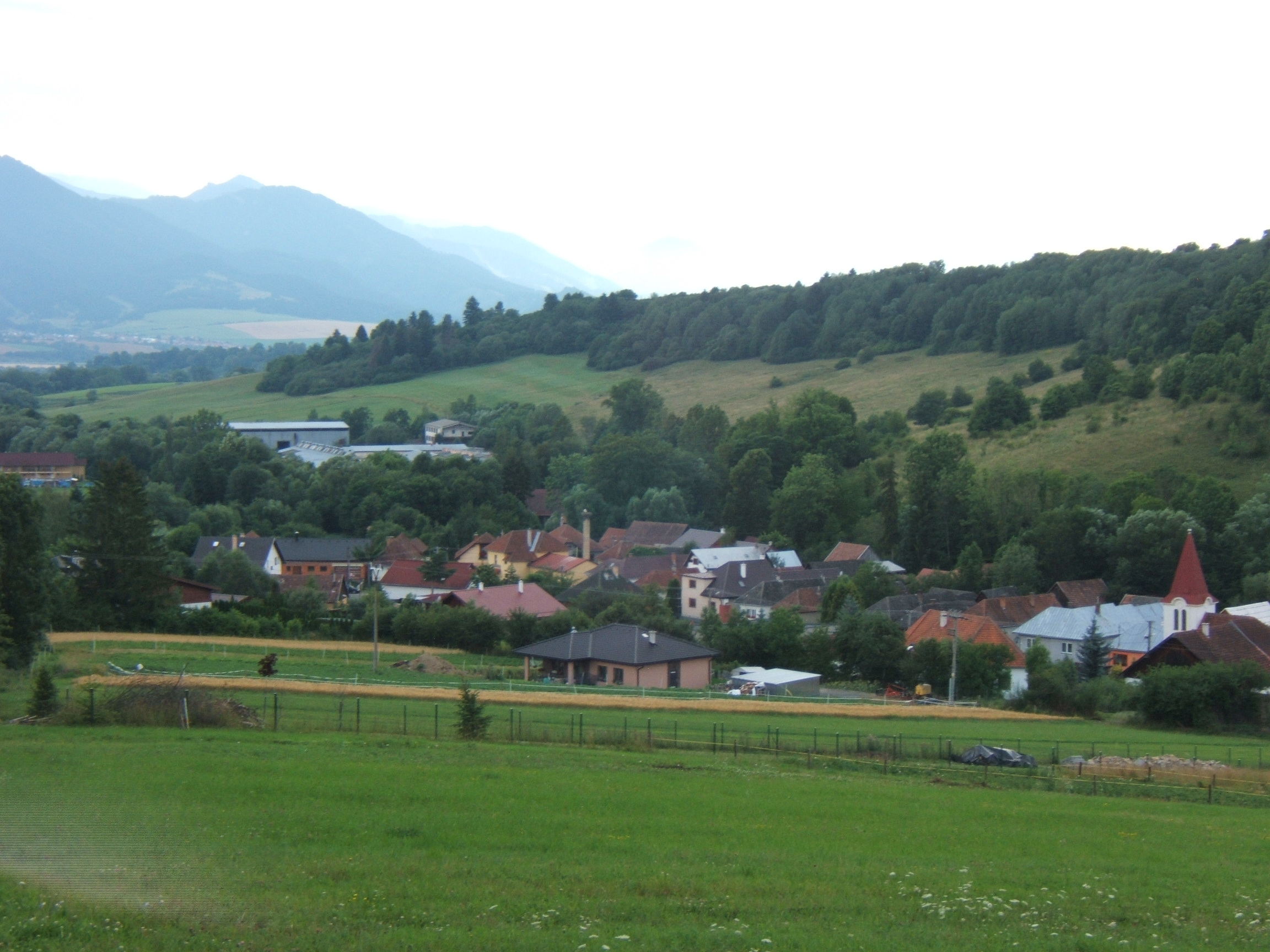

- Flag

- Location of Liptovský Ondrej in the Žilina Region Location of Liptovský Ondrej in Slovakia
- Coordinates: 49.10°N 19.72°E
- Country: Slovakia
- Region: Žilina Region
- District: Liptovský Mikuláš District
- First mentioned: 1332

Area
  - Total: 4.68 km^{2} (1.81 sq mi)
- Elevation: 678 m (2,224 ft)

Population (2025)
  - Total: 670
- Time zone: UTC+1 (CET)
  - Summer (DST): UTC+2 (CEST)
- Postal code: 310 4
- Area code: +421 44
- Vehicle registration plate (until 2022): LM
- Website: liptovskyondrej.sk

Liptovský Ondrej (Slovak: [ˈliptɔwskiː ˈɔndrej]; Hungarian: Szentandrás) is a village and municipality in Liptovský Mikuláš District in the Žilina Region of northern Slovakia.

== History ==
In historical records the village was first mentioned in 1332. Before the establishment of independent Czechoslovakia in 1918, it was part of Liptó County within the Kingdom of Hungary. From 1939 to 1945, it was part of the Slovak Republic.

== Geography ==
The municipality lies at an altitude of 678 metres (2,224 ft) and covers an area of 4.68 km^{2} (1.81 sq mi) (2025).

== Population ==
Population statistic (10 years)
Year	1995	2005	2015	2025
Count	456	569	612	670
Difference		+24.78%	+7.55%	+9.47%

Population statistic
Year	2024	2025
Count	671	670
Difference		−0.14%

It has a population of 670 people (31 December 2025).

=== Ethnicity ===
Census 2021 (1+ %)
Ethnicity	Number	Fraction
Slovak	621	99.04%
Czech	7	1.11%
Total	627	

In year 2021 was 627 people by ethnicity 621 as Slovak, 7 as Czech, 3 as German, 2 as Polish, 1 as Rusyn, 1 as Not found out and 1 as Hungarian.

Note on population: The difference values of population numbers in the table "Population statistic" and in the sections "Ethnicity" & "Religion" is caused by the use of various statistical methods.

=== Religion ===
Census 2021 (1+ %)
Religion	Number	Fraction
Evangelical Church	312	49.76%
None	181	28.87%
Roman Catholic Church	116	18.5%
Total	627	

In year 2021 was 627 people by religion 312 from Evangelical Church, 181 from None, 116 from Roman Catholic Church, 5 from Not found out, 3 from United Methodist Church, 2 from Other and not ascertained christian church, 2 from Greek Catholic Church, 2 from Ad hoc movements, 1 from Old Catholic Church, 1 from Paganism and natural spirituality, 1 from Islam and 1 from Buddhism.
