= Lazisko =

Village and municipality in Slovakia

- Municipality
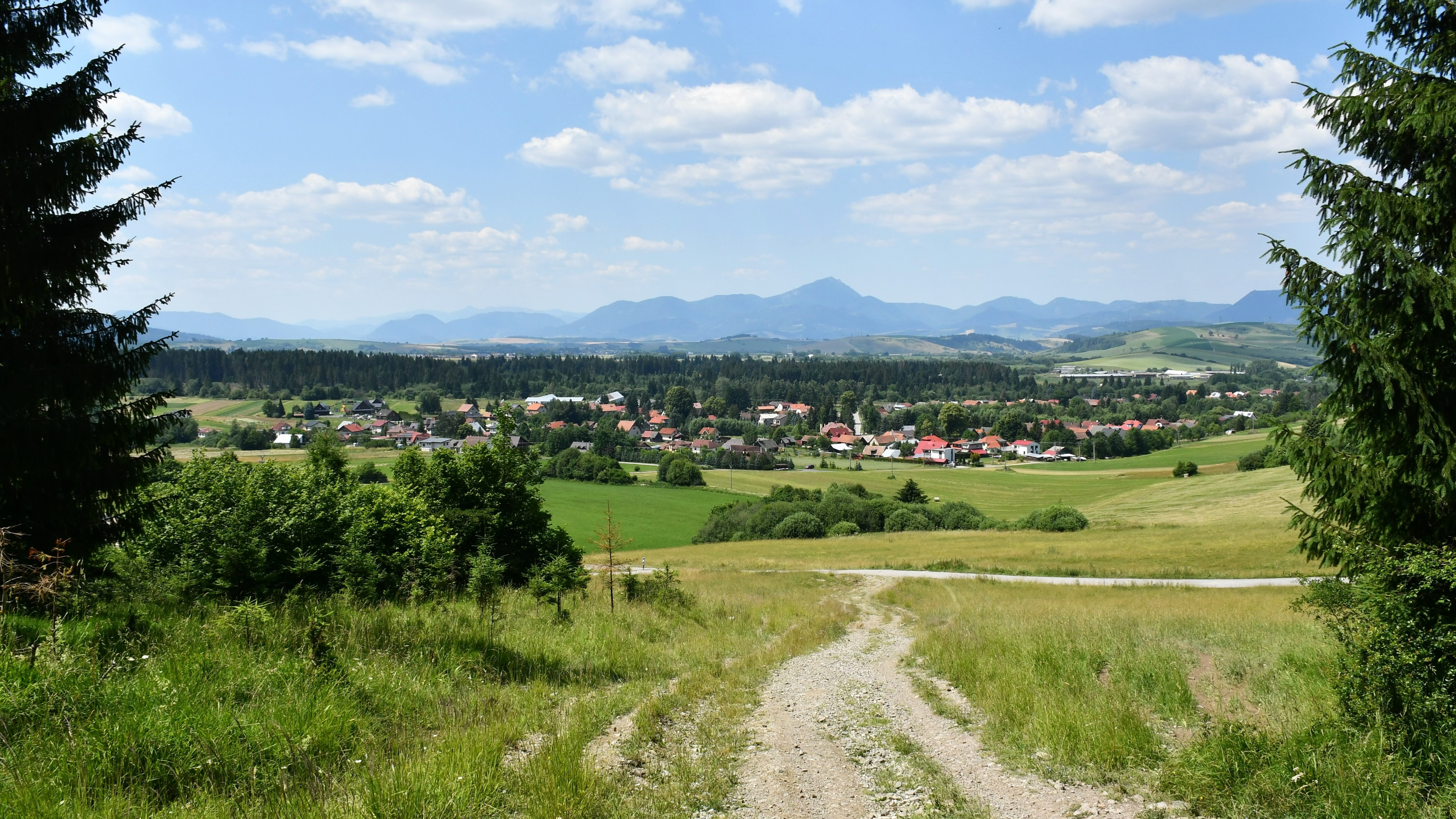

- Flag Coat of arms

- Location of Lazisko in the Žilina Region Location of Lazisko in Slovakia
- Coordinates: 49.03°N 19.55°E
- Country: Slovakia
- Region: Žilina Region
- District: Liptovský Mikuláš District
- First mentioned: 1352

Area
  - Total: 23.98 km^{2} (9.26 sq mi)
- Elevation: 676 m (2,218 ft)

Population (2025)
  - Total: 375
- Time zone: UTC+1 (CET)
  - Summer (DST): UTC+2 (CEST)
- Postal code: 321 1
- Area code: +421 44
- Vehicle registration plate (until 2022): LM
- Website: www.lazisko.sk

Lazisko (Hungarian: Laziszkó) is a village and municipality in Liptovský Mikuláš District in the Žilina Region of northern Slovakia.

== History ==
In historical records the village was first mentioned in 1352. Before the establishment of independent Czechoslovakia in 1918, it was part of Liptó County within the Kingdom of Hungary. From 1939 to 1945, it was part of the Slovak Republic.

== Geography ==
The municipality lies at an altitude of 676 metres (2,218 ft) and covers an area of 23.98 km^{2} (9.26 sq mi) (2025).

== Population ==
Population statistic (10 years)
Year	1995	2005	2015	2025
Count	425	429	405	375
Difference		+0.94%	−5.59%	−7.40%

Population statistic
Year	2024	2025
Count	371	375
Difference		+1.07%

It has a population of 375 people (31 December 2025).

=== Ethnicity ===
Census 2021 (1+ %)
Ethnicity	Number	Fraction
Slovak	369	99.19%
Czech	4	1.07%
Not found out	4	1.07%
Total	372	

In year 2021 was 372 people by ethnicity 369 as Slovak, 4 as Czech, 4 as Not found out, 2 as Other, 1 as Russian and 1 as Polish.

Note on population: The difference values of population numbers in the table "Population statistic" and in the sections "Ethnicity" & "Religion" is caused by the use of various statistical methods.

=== Religion ===
Census 2021 (1+ %)
Religion	Number	Fraction
Evangelical Church	169	45.43%
None	104	27.96%
Roman Catholic Church	96	25.81%
Total	372	

In year 2021 was 372 people by religion 169 from Evangelical Church, 104 from None, 96 from Roman Catholic Church, 1 from Jehovah's Witnesses, 1 from Greek Catholic Church and 1 from United Methodist Church.
