= Bobrovček =

Municipality of Slovakia

- Municipality
- Flag

- Location of Bobrovček in the Žilina Region Location of Bobrovček in Slovakia
- Coordinates: 49.15°N 19.60°E
- Country: Slovakia
- Region: Žilina Region
- District: Liptovský Mikuláš District
- First mentioned: 1231

Area
  - Total: 3.42 km^{2} (1.32 sq mi)
- Elevation: 661 m (2,169 ft)

Population (2025)
  - Total: 158
- Time zone: UTC+1 (CET)
  - Summer (DST): UTC+2 (CEST)
- Postal code: 322 1
- Area code: +421 44
- Vehicle registration plate (until 2022): LM
- Website: www.bobrovcek.sk

Bobrovček (Hungarian: Kisbobróc) is a village and municipality in Liptovský Mikuláš District in the Žilina Region of northern Slovakia.

== History ==
In historical records the village was first mentioned in 1231. Before the establishment of independent Czechoslovakia in 1918, it was part of Liptó County within the Kingdom of Hungary. From 1939 to 1945, it was part of the Slovak Republic.

== Geography ==
The municipality lies at an altitude of 661 metres (2,169 ft) and covers an area of 3.42 km^{2} (1.32 sq mi) (2025).

== Population ==
Population statistic (10 years)
Year	1995	2005	2015	2025
Count	224	200	179	158
Difference		−10.71%	−10.5%	−11.73%

Population statistic
Year	2024	2025
Count	158	158
Difference		+0%

It has a population of 158 people (31 December 2025).

=== Ethnicity ===
Census 2021 (1+ %)
Ethnicity	Number	Fraction
Slovak	166	97.64%
Not found out	3	1.76%
Total	170	

In year 2021 was 170 people by ethnicity 166 as Slovak, 3 as Not found out and 1 as Czech.

Note on population: The difference values of population numbers in the table "Population statistic" and in the sections "Ethnicity" & "Religion" is caused by the use of various statistical methods.

=== Religion ===
Census 2021 (1+ %)
Religion	Number	Fraction
Roman Catholic Church	70	41.18%
Evangelical Church	58	34.12%
None	36	21.18%
Not found out	3	1.76%
Greek Catholic Church	2	1.18%
Total	170	

In year 2021 was 170 people by religion 70 from Roman Catholic Church, 58 from Evangelical Church, 36 from None, 3 from Not found out, 2 from Greek Catholic Church and 1 from Ad hoc movements.

== Genealogical resources ==
The records for genealogical research are available at the state archive "Statny Archiv in Bytca, Slovakia"

- Roman Catholic church records (births/marriages/deaths): 1732-1900 (parish B)
- Lutheran church records (births/marriages/deaths): 1783-1904 (parish B)

== See also ==
- List of municipalities and towns in Slovakia
