= Pavlova Ves =

- Municipality
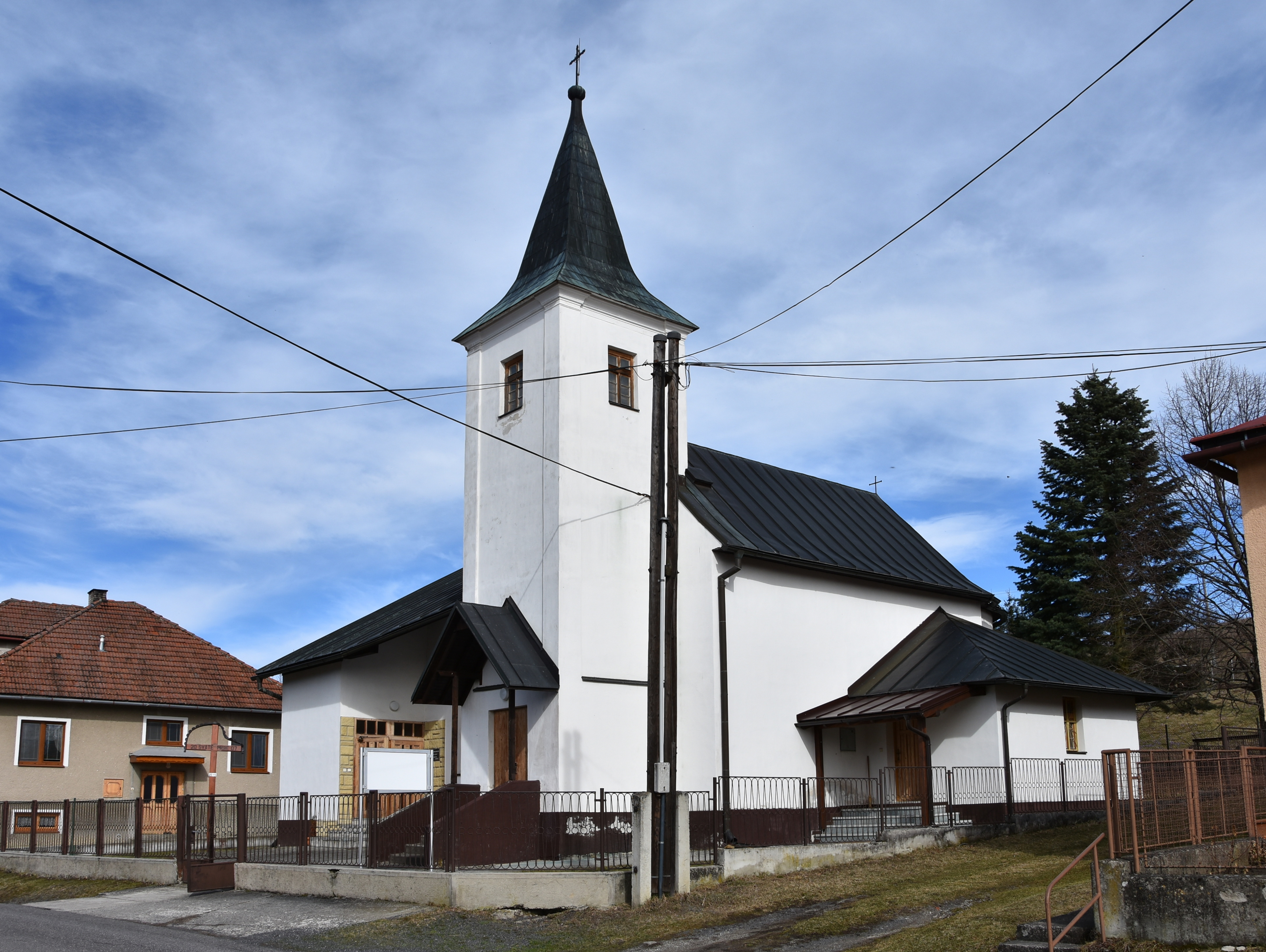

- Flag Coat of arms

- Location of Pavlova Ves in the Žilina Region Location of Pavlova Ves in Slovakia
- Coordinates: 49.13°N 19.58°E
- Country: Slovakia
- Region: Žilina Region
- District: Liptovský Mikuláš District
- First mentioned: 1469

Area
  - Total: 6.83 km^{2} (2.64 sq mi)
- Elevation: 620 m (2,030 ft)

Population (2025)
  - Total: 276
- Time zone: UTC+1 (CET)
  - Summer (DST): UTC+2 (CEST)
- Postal code: 322 1
- Area code: +421 44
- Vehicle registration plate (until 2022): LM
- Website: pavlovaves.sk

Pavlova Ves (Hungarian: Pálfalu) is a village and municipality in Liptovský Mikuláš District in the Žilina Region of northern Slovakia.

== History ==
In historical records the village was first mentioned in 1469 AD. Before the establishment of independent Czechoslovakia in 1918, it was part of Liptó County within the Kingdom of Hungary. From 1939 to 1945, it was part of the Slovak Republic.

== Geography ==
The municipality lies at an altitude of 620 metres (2,030 ft) and covers an area of 6.83 km^{2} (2.64 sq mi) (2025).

== Population ==
Population statistic (10 years)
Year	1995	2005	2015	2025
Count	280	247	257	276
Difference		−11.78%	+4.04%	+7.39%

Population statistic
Year	2024	2025
Count	281	276
Difference		−1.77%

It has a population of 276 people (31 December 2025).

=== Ethnicity ===
Census 2021 (1+ %)
Ethnicity	Number	Fraction
Slovak	267	94.01%
Romani	10	3.52%
Not found out	10	3.52%
Czech	4	1.4%
Polish	4	1.4%
Total	284	

In year 2021 was 284 people by ethnicity 267 as Slovak, 10 as Romani, 10 as Not found out, 4 as Czech, 4 as Polish, 2 as Hungarian and 2 as Other.

Note on population: The difference values of population numbers in the table "Population statistic" and in the sections "Ethnicity" & "Religion" is caused by the use of various statistical methods.

=== Religion ===
Census 2021 (1+ %)
Religion	Number	Fraction
Roman Catholic Church	124	43.66%
None	109	38.38%
Evangelical Church	28	9.86%
Not found out	7	2.46%
Other and not ascertained christian church	5	1.76%
Greek Catholic Church	3	1.06%
Total	284	

In year 2021 was 284 people by religion 124 from Roman Catholic Church, 109 from None, 28 from Evangelical Church, 7 from Not found out, 5 from Other and not ascertained christian church, 3 from Greek Catholic Church, 2 from Old Catholic Church, 2 from Jehovah's Witnesses, 2 from Ad hoc movements, 1 from Jewish community and 1 from Other.
