= Liptovské Beharovce =

Municipality in Žilina Region, Slovakia

- Municipality
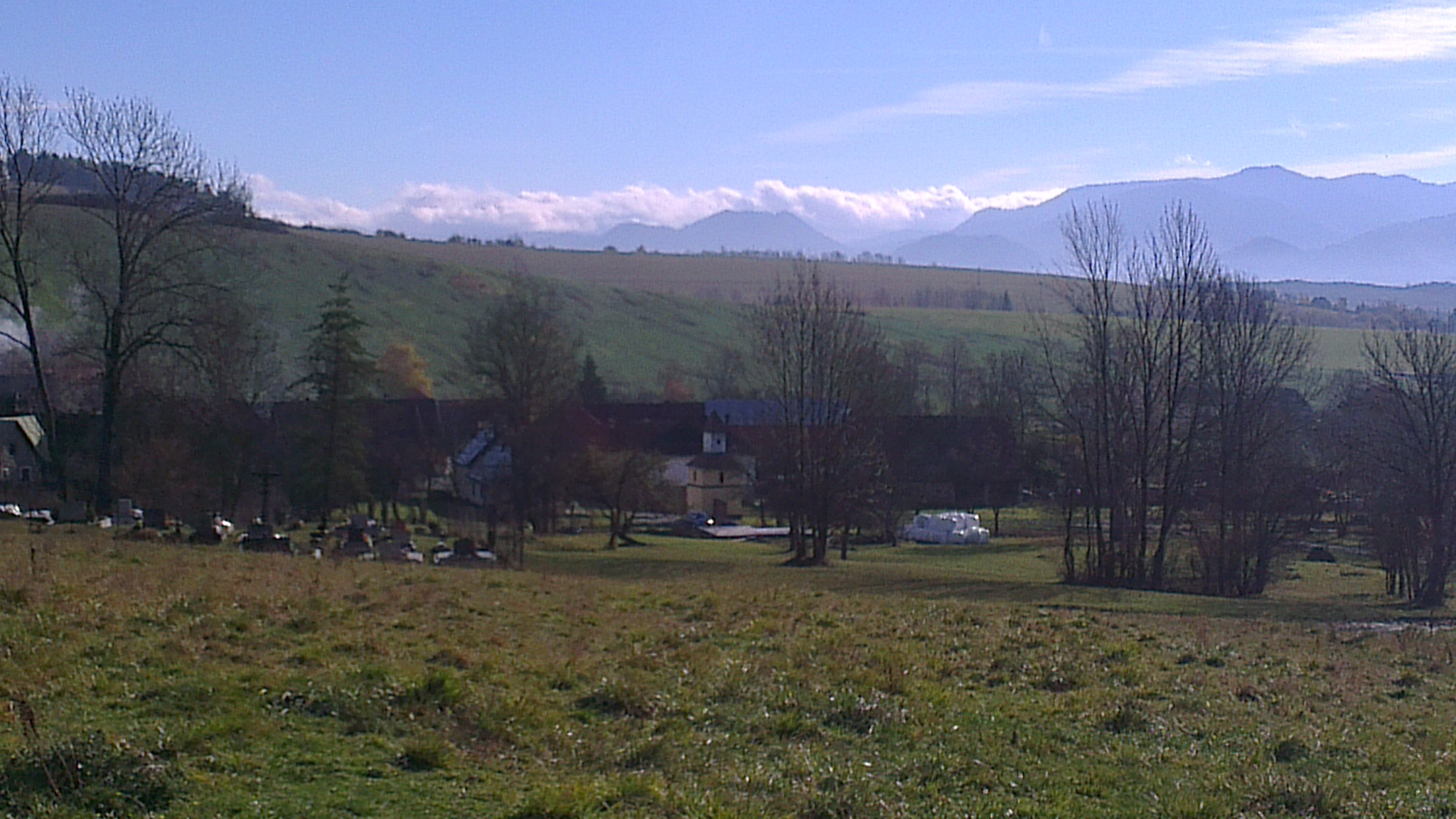

- Flag

- Location of Liptovské Beharovce in the Žilina Region Location of Liptovské Beharovce in Slovakia
- Coordinates: 49.13°N 19.58°E
- Country: Slovakia
- Region: Žilina Region
- District: Liptovský Mikuláš District
- First mentioned: 1295

Government
  - Mayor: Anna Pruknerová (Ind.)

Area
  - Total: 1.99 km^{2} (0.77 sq mi)
- Elevation: 634 m (2,080 ft)

Population (2025)
  - Total: 101
- Time zone: UTC+1 (CET)
  - Summer (DST): UTC+2 (CEST)
- Postal code: 322 1
- Area code: +421 44
- Vehicle registration plate (until 2022): LM
- Website: liptovskebeharovce.sk

Liptovské Beharovce (Slovak: [ˈliptɔwskeː ˈbeɦarɔwtse]; Hungarian: Behárfalu) is a village and municipality in Liptovský Mikuláš District in the Žilina Region of northern Slovakia.

== History ==
In historical records the village was first mentioned in 1295. Before the establishment of independent Czechoslovakia in 1918, it was part of Liptó County within the Kingdom of Hungary. From 1939 to 1945, it was part of the Slovak Republic.

== Geography ==
The municipality lies at an altitude of 634 metres (2,080 ft) and covers an area of 1.99 km^{2} (0.77 sq mi) (2025).

== Population ==
Population statistic (10 years)
Year	1995	2005	2015	2025
Count	52	56	72	101
Difference		+7.69%	+28.57%	+40.27%

Population statistic
Year	2024	2025
Count	90	101
Difference		+12.22%

It has a population of 101 people (31 December 2025).

=== Ethnicity ===
Census 2021 (1+ %)
Ethnicity	Number	Fraction
Slovak	78	97.5%
Irish	2	2.5%
Not found out	2	2.5%
Czech	1	1.25%
Rusyn	1	1.25%
Other	1	1.25%
Total	80	

In year 2021 was 80 people by ethnicity 78 as Slovak, 2 as Irish, 2 as Not found out, 1 as Czech, 1 as Rusyn and 1 as Other.

Note on population: The difference values of population numbers in the table "Population statistic" and in the sections "Ethnicity" & "Religion" is caused by the use of various statistical methods.

=== Religion ===
Census 2021 (1+ %)
Religion	Number	Fraction
Roman Catholic Church	45	56.25%
None	22	27.5%
Evangelical Church	6	7.5%
Other	2	2.5%
Greek Catholic Church	2	2.5%
Paganism and natural spirituality	1	1.25%
Not found out	1	1.25%
Buddhism	1	1.25%
Total	80	

In year 2021 was 80 people by religion 45 from Roman Catholic Church, 22 from None, 6 from Evangelical Church, 2 from Other, 2 from Greek Catholic Church, 1 from Paganism and natural spirituality, 1 from Not found out and 1 from Buddhism.
