= Galovany =

Village and municipality in Slovakia

- Municipality
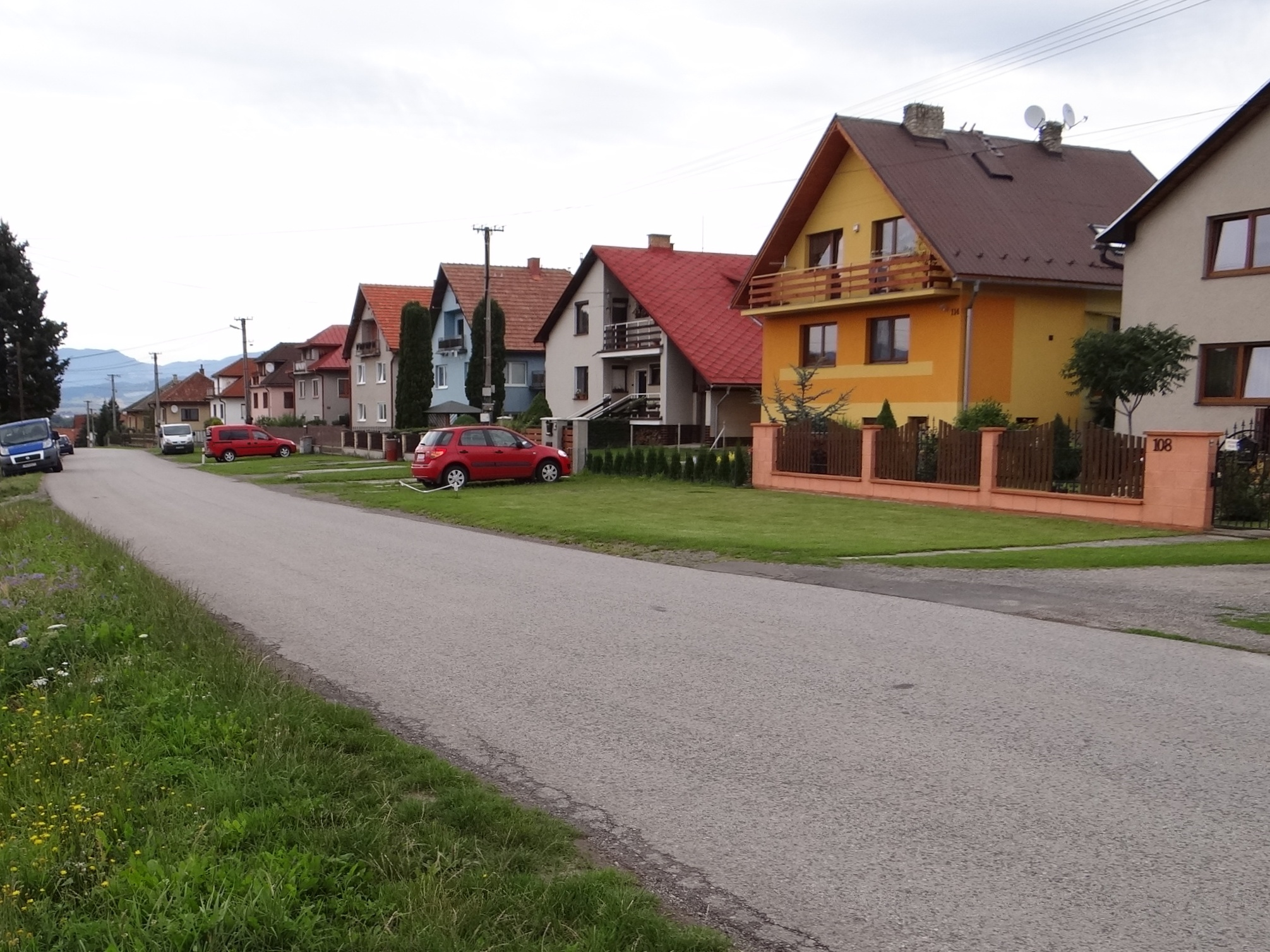

- Flag

- Location of Galovany in the Žilina Region Location of Galovany in Slovakia
- Coordinates: 49.07°N 19.53°E
- Country: Slovakia
- Region: Žilina Region
- District: Liptovský Mikuláš District
- First mentioned: 1600

Area
  - Total: 12.92 km^{2} (4.99 sq mi)
- Elevation: 586 m (1,923 ft)

Population (2025)
  - Total: 325
- Time zone: UTC+1 (CET)
  - Summer (DST): UTC+2 (CEST)
- Postal code: 321 3
- Area code: +421 44
- Vehicle registration plate (until 2022): LM
- Website: www.galovany.sk

Galovany (Hungarian: Gálfalu) is a village and municipality in Liptovský Mikuláš District in the Žilina Region of northern Slovakia. The village merged with the former Velika Paludza village in the 19th century.

== History ==
In historical records the village was first mentioned in 1600. Before the establishment of independent Czechoslovakia in 1918, it was part of Liptó County within the Kingdom of Hungary. From 1939 to 1945, it was part of the Slovak Republic.

== Geography ==
The municipality lies at an altitude of 586 metres (1,923 ft) and covers an area of 12.92 km^{2} (4.99 sq mi) (2025).

== Population ==
Population statistic (10 years)
Year	1995	2005	2015	2025
Count	217	276	269	325
Difference		+27.18%	−2.53%	+20.81%

Population statistic
Year	2024	2025
Count	315	325
Difference		+3.17%

It has a population of 325 people (31 December 2025).

=== Ethnicity ===
Census 2021 (1+ %)
Ethnicity	Number	Fraction
Slovak	309	99.35%
Not found out	4	1.28%
Total	311	

In year 2021 was 311 people by ethnicity 309 as Slovak, 4 as Not found out and 1 as English.

Note on population: The difference values of population numbers in the table "Population statistic" and in the sections "Ethnicity" & "Religion" is caused by the use of various statistical methods.

=== Religion ===
Census 2021 (1+ %)
Religion	Number	Fraction
Evangelical Church	141	45.34%
Roman Catholic Church	82	26.37%
None	80	25.72%
Total	311	

In year 2021 was 311 people by religion 141 from Evangelical Church, 82 from Roman Catholic Church, 80 from None, 3 from Not found out, 2 from Jehovah's Witnesses, 1 from Other, 1 from Greek Catholic Church and 1 from Ad hoc movements.

== Genealogical resources ==
The records for genealogical research are available at the state archive "Statny Archiv in Bytca, Slovakia"

- Roman Catholic church records (births/marriages/deaths): 1712-1933 (parish B)
- Lutheran church records (births/marriages/deaths): 1659-1948 (parish B)

== See also ==
- List of municipalities and towns in Slovakia
