= Beňadiková =

Village and municipality in Slovakia

- Municipality
- Flag

- Location of Beňadiková in the Žilina Region Location of Beňadiková in Slovakia
- Coordinates: 49.07°N 19.68°E
- Country: Slovakia
- Region: Žilina Region
- District: Liptovský Mikuláš District
- First mentioned: 1352

Area
  - Total: 4.97 km^{2} (1.92 sq mi)
- Elevation: 619 m (2,031 ft)

Population (2025)
  - Total: 529
- Time zone: UTC+1 (CET)
  - Summer (DST): UTC+2 (CEST)
- Postal code: 310 4
- Area code: +421 44
- Vehicle registration plate (until 2022): LM
- Website: www.benadikova.sk

Beňadiková (Hungarian: Benedekfalu) is a village and municipality in Liptovský Mikuláš District in the Žilina Region of northern Slovakia.

== History ==
In historical records the village was first mentioned in 1352. Before the establishment of independent Czechoslovakia in 1918, it was part of Liptó County within the Kingdom of Hungary. From 1939 to 1945, it was part of the Slovak Republic.

== Geography ==
The municipality lies at an altitude of 619 metres (2,031 ft) and covers an area of 4.97 km^{2} (1.92 sq mi) (2025).

== Population ==
Population statistic (10 years)
Year	1995	2005	2015	2025
Count	427	435	491	529
Difference		+1.87%	+12.87%	+7.73%

Population statistic
Year	2024	2025
Count	527	529
Difference		+0.37%

It has a population of 529 people (31 December 2025).

=== Ethnicity ===
Census 2021 (1+ %)
Ethnicity	Number	Fraction
Slovak	521	97.74%
Czech	12	2.25%
Total	533	

In year 2021 was 533 people by ethnicity 521 as Slovak, 12 as Czech, 3 as Not found out, 1 as Ukrainian, 1 as Rusyn, 1 as Polish, 1 as Hungarian and 1 as Other.

Note on population: The difference values of population numbers in the table "Population statistic" and in the sections "Ethnicity" & "Religion" is caused by the use of various statistical methods.

=== Religion ===
Census 2021 (1+ %)
Religion	Number	Fraction
None	206	38.65%
Evangelical Church	188	35.27%
Roman Catholic Church	103	19.32%
United Methodist Church	10	1.88%
Not found out	9	1.69%
Total	533	

In year 2021 was 533 people by religion 206 from None, 188 from Evangelical Church, 103 from Roman Catholic Church, 10 from United Methodist Church, 9 from Not found out, 4 from Seventh-day Adventist Church, 3 from Other, 3 from Greek Catholic Church, 2 from Eastern Orthodox Church, 2 from Christian Congregations in Slovakia, 1 from Other and not ascertained christian church, 1 from Jehovah's Witnesses and 1 from Islam.

== Genealogical resources ==
The records for genealogical research are available at the state archive "Statny Archiv in Bytca, Slovakia"

- Roman Catholic church records (births/marriages/deaths): 1729-1895 (parish B)
- Lutheran church records (births/marriages/deaths): 1783-1951 (parish B)

== See also ==
- List of municipalities and towns in Slovakia
