= Liptovský Mikuláš District =

Coordinates: 49°4′50″N 19°37′20″E

- District
- Country: Slovakia
- Region (kraj): Žilina Region
- Cultural region: Liptov
- Seat: Liptovský Mikuláš

Area
  - Total: 1,340.99 km^{2} (517.76 sq mi)

Population (2025)
  - Total: 70,995
- Time zone: UTC+1 (CET)
  - Summer (DST): UTC+2 (CEST)
- Telephone prefix: 044
- Vehicle registration plate (until 2022): LM
- Municipalities: 56

Liptovský Mikuláš District (okres Liptovský Mikuláš) is a district in the eastern part of Žilina Region of central Slovakia. The district was established in the 19th century with its current name and exists within current borders since 1996. Its main cultural and economic center is its seat Liptovský Mikuláš. Liptovský Mikuláš District main economic branches are industry and tourism. In the district is located Liptovská Mara dam, one of the largest water reservoirs in Slovakia.

== Population ==
Population statistic (10 years)
Year	1995	2005	2015	2025
Count	74,629	73,418	72,450	70,995
Difference		−1.62%	−1.31%	−2.00%

Population statistic
Year	2024	2025
Count	71,186	70,995
Difference		−0.26%

It has a population of 70,995 people (31 December 2025).

Historical population
Year	Pop.	±%
1970	64,419	—
1980	68,702	+6.6%
1991	73,469	+6.9%
2001	73,984	+0.7%
2011	72,627	−1.8%
2021	71,935	−1.0%
Source: Statistical Office of the Slovak Republic

=== Ethnicity ===
Census 2021 (1+ %)
Ethnicity	Number	Fraction
Slovak	67,414	90.65%
Not found out	3620	4.86%
Romani	1268	1.7%
Czech	947	1.27%
Total	74,366	

In year 2021 was 74,366 people by ethnicity 67,414 as Slovak, 3620 as Not found out, 1268 as Romani, 947 as Czech, 235 as Other, 168 as Hungarian, 128 as Rusyn, 117 as Russian, 104 as Polish, 73 as German, 54 as Ukrainian, 36 as Moravian, 33 as English, 23 as Vietnamese, 17 as Austrian, 17 as Greek, 15 as Jewish, 15 as Serbian, 13 as Italian, 10 as Irish, 10 as Turkish, 10 as Canadian, 10 as French, 9 as Chinese, 7 as Silesian, 5 as Albanian, 4 as Romanian, 2 as Croatian and 2 as Bulgarian.

Note on population: The difference values of population numbers in the table "Population statistic" and in the sections "Ethnicity" & "Religion" is caused by the use of various statistical methods.

=== Religion ===
Census 2021 (1+ %)
Religion	Number	Fraction
None	23,359	32.47%
Roman Catholic Church	22,569	31.37%
Evangelical Church	19,499	27.11%
Not found out	3811	5.3%
Total	71,935	

In year 2021 was 71,935 people by religion 23,359 from None, 22,569 from Roman Catholic Church, 19,499 from Evangelical Church, 3811 from Not found out, 617 from Greek Catholic Church, 376 from Jehovah's Witnesses, 270 from Ad hoc movements, 258 from Other and not ascertained christian church, 238 from Other, 161 from Baptists Church, 130 from Eastern Orthodox Church, 128 from Christian Congregations in Slovakia, 101 from United Methodist Church, 97 from Buddhism, 72 from Seventh-day Adventist Church, 69 from Paganism and natural spirituality, 37 from Islam, 35 from Church of the Brethren, 24 from Calvinist Church, 23 from Apostolic Church, 21 from Old Catholic Church, 20 from Jewish community, 10 from Czechoslovak Hussite Church, 7 from Hinduism and 3 from Bahá'i Community.

== Municipalities ==
Municipality	Area [km^{2}]	Population
Beňadiková	4.97	529
Bobrovček	3.42	158
Bobrovec	31.14	2,007
Bobrovník	6.77	121
Bukovina	1.90	111
Demänovská Dolina	47.84	379
Dúbrava	23.21	1,180
Galovany	12.92	325
Gôtovany	2.91	513
Huty	11.57	137
Hybe	52.86	1,442
Ižipovce	2.63	92
Jakubovany	9.10	375
Jalovec	20.17	311
Jamník	45.61	449
Konská	11.80	218
Kráľova Lehota	165.33	598
Kvačany	22.43	549
Lazisko	23.98	375
Liptovská Anna	11.28	106
Liptovská Kokava	19.88	875
Liptovská Porúbka	42.22	1,221
Liptovská Sielnica	17.25	566
Liptovské Beharovce	1.99	101
Liptovské Kľačany	13.41	389
Liptovské Matiašovce	5.73	327
Liptovský Hrádok	18.32	6,979
Liptovský Ján	67.77	1,109
Liptovský Mikuláš	69.97	29,710
Liptovský Ondrej	4.68	670
Liptovský Peter	6.12	1,254
Liptovský Trnovec	27.45	639
Ľubeľa	17.45	1,188
Malatíny	4.17	262
Malé Borové	5.83	112
Malužiná	39.48	233
Nižná Boca	25.17	155
Partizánska Ľupča	92.40	1,294
Pavčina Lehota	7.21	411
Pavlova Ves	6.83	276
Podtureň	5.08	1,062
Pribylina	73.93	1,309
Prosiek	12.67	245
Smrečany	8.04	698
Svätý Kríž	9.41	974
Trstené	3.94	222
Uhorská Ves	4.45	561
Vavrišovo	9.90	688
Važec	59.68	2,366
Veľké Borové	10.98	40
Veterná Poruba	4.72	358
Vlachy	11.22	647
Východná	41.97	2,218
Vyšná Boca	20.59	90
Závažná Poruba	18.65	1,285
Žiar	21.89	486

Population and area values are current for year 2025.
