= Ižipovce =

Village and municipality in Slovakia

- Municipality
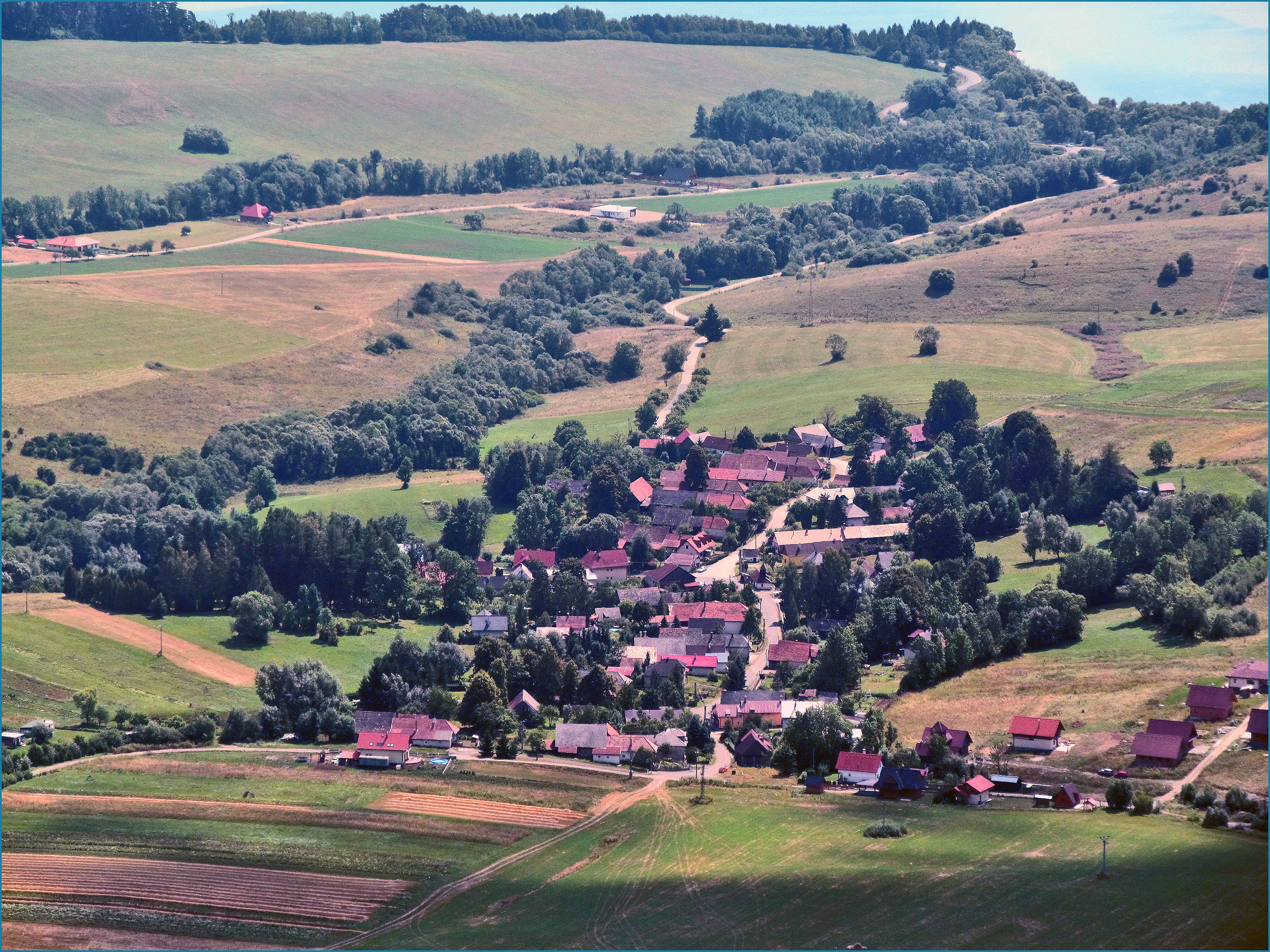

- Flag

- Location of Ižipovce in the Žilina Region Location of Ižipovce in Slovakia
- Coordinates: 49.15°N 19.50°E
- Country: Slovakia
- Region: Žilina Region
- District: Liptovský Mikuláš District
- First mentioned: 1286

Area
  - Total: 2.63 km^{2} (1.02 sq mi)
- Elevation: 598 m (1,962 ft)

Population (2025)
  - Total: 92
- Time zone: UTC+1 (CET)
  - Summer (DST): UTC+2 (CEST)
- Postal code: 322 3
- Area code: +421 44
- Vehicle registration plate (until 2022): LM
- Website: www.obec-izipovce.sk

Ižipovce (Hungarian: Izsépfalu) is a village and municipality in Liptovský Mikuláš District in the Žilina Region of northern Slovakia.

== History ==
In historical records the village was first mentioned in 1286. Before the establishment of independent Czechoslovakia in 1918, it was part of Liptó County within the Kingdom of Hungary. From 1939 to 1945, it was part of the Slovak Republic.

== Geography ==
The municipality lies at an altitude of 598 metres (1,962 ft) and covers an area of 2.63 km^{2} (1.02 sq mi) (2025).

== Population ==
Population statistic (10 years)
| Year | 1995 | 2005 | 2015 | 2025 |
|---|---|---|---|---|
| Count | 91 | 85 | 91 | 92 |
| Difference | | −6.59% | +7.05% | +1.09% |

Population statistic
| Year | 2024 | 2025 |
|---|---|---|
| Count | 98 | 92 |
| Difference | | −6.12% |

It has a population of 92 people (31 December 2025).

=== Ethnicity ===
Census 2021 (1+ %)
| Ethnicity | Number | Fraction |
|---|---|---|
| Slovak | 88 | 98.87% |
| Not found out | 1 | 1.12% |
| Total | 89 | |

In year 2021 was 89 people by ethnicity 88 as Slovak and 1 as Not found out.

Note on population: The difference values of population numbers in the table "Population statistic" and in the sections "Ethnicity" & "Religion" is caused by the use of various statistical methods.

=== Religion ===
Census 2021 (1+ %)
| Religion | Number | Fraction |
|---|---|---|
| Evangelical Church | 41 | 46.07% |
| None | 24 | 26.97% |
| Roman Catholic Church | 17 | 19.1% |
| Ad hoc movements | 3 | 3.37% |
| Calvinist Church | 1 | 1.12% |
| Not found out | 1 | 1.12% |
| Other | 1 | 1.12% |
| Greek Catholic Church | 1 | 1.12% |
| Total | 89 | |

In year 2021 was 89 people by religion 41 from Evangelical Church, 24 from None, 17 from Roman Catholic Church, 3 from Ad hoc movements, 1 from Calvinist Church, 1 from Not found out, 1 from Other and 1 from Greek Catholic Church.

== Genealogical resources ==
The records for genealogical research are available at the state archive "Statny Archiv in Bytca, Slovakia"

- Lutheran church records (births/marriages/deaths): 1783-1924 (parish B)

== See also ==
- List of municipalities and towns in Slovakia
