= Kvačany, Liptovský Mikuláš District =

Kvačany
- Municipality
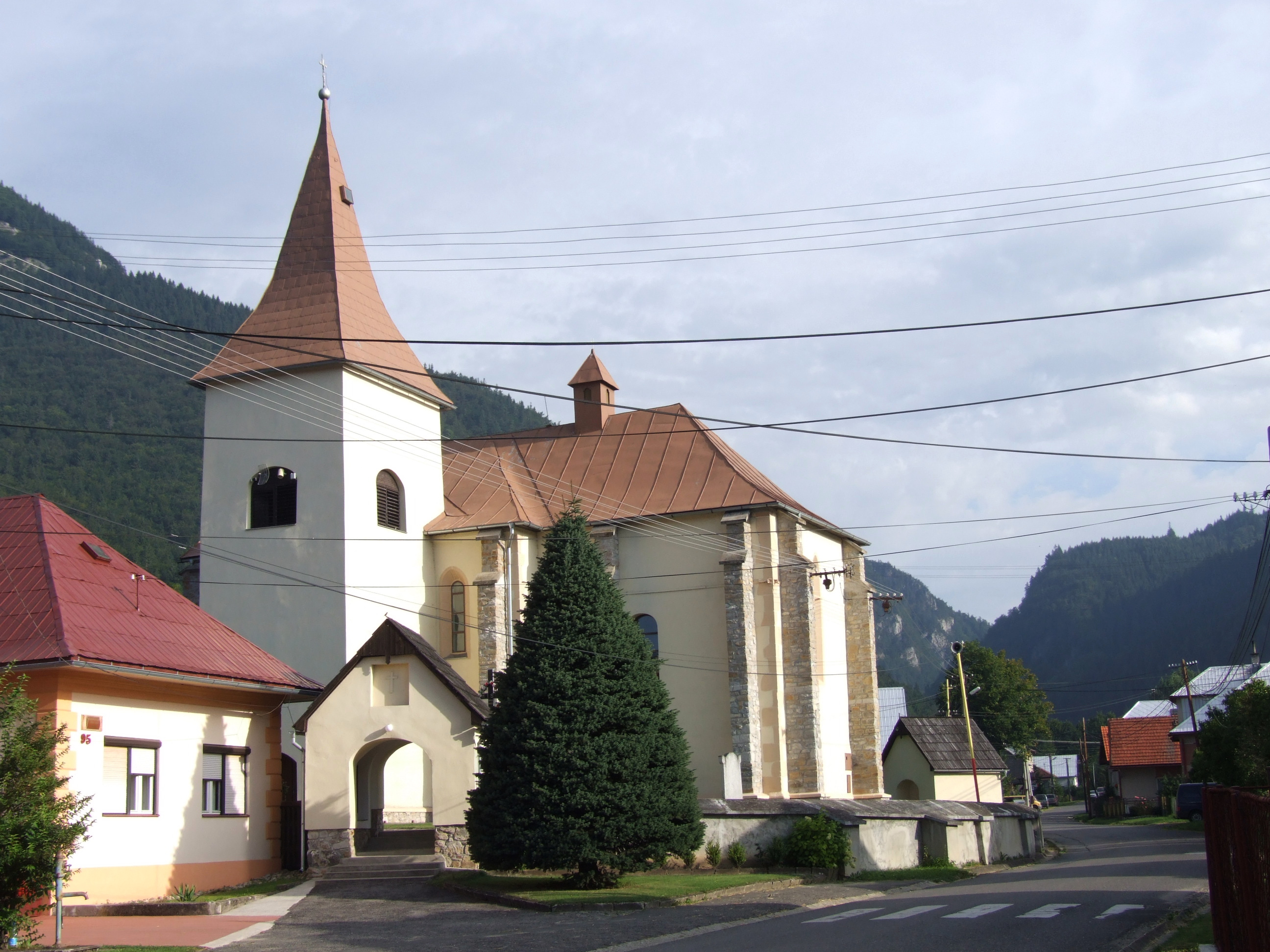

- Flag

- Location of Kvačany in the Žilina Region Location of Kvačany in Slovakia
- Coordinates: 49.1728°N 19.5436°E
- Country: Slovakia
- Region: Žilina Region
- District: Liptovský Mikuláš District
- First mentioned: 1286

Area
  - Total: 22.43 km^{2} (8.66 sq mi)
- Elevation: 623 m (2,044 ft)

Population (2025)
  - Total: 549
- Time zone: UTC+1 (CET)
  - Summer (DST): UTC+2 (CEST)
- Postal code: 322 4
- Area code: +421 44
- Vehicle registration plate (until 2022): LM
- Website: www.kvacanylm.sk

Kvačany (Hungarian: Kvacsan) is a village and municipality in Liptovský Mikuláš District in the Žilina Region of northern Slovakia.

== History ==
In historical records the village was first mentioned in 1286. Before the establishment of independent Czechoslovakia in 1918, it was part of Liptó County within the Kingdom of Hungary. From 1939 to 1945, it was part of the Slovak Republic.

== Geography ==
The municipality lies at an altitude of 623 metres (2,044 ft) and covers an area of 22.43 km^{2} (8.66 sq mi) (2025).

== Population ==
Population statistic (10 years)
Year	1995	2005	2015	2025
Count	572	540	555	549
Difference		−5.59%	+2.77%	−1.08%

Population statistic
Year	2024	2025
Count	553	549
Difference		−0.72%

It has a population of 549 people (31 December 2025).

=== Ethnicity ===
Census 2021 (1+ %)
Ethnicity	Number	Fraction
Slovak	554	99.28%
Total	558	

In year 2021 was 558 people by ethnicity 554 as Slovak, 3 as Ukrainian, 3 as Other, 2 as Czech, 2 as Hungarian and 1 as Not found out.

Note on population: The difference values of population numbers in the table "Population statistic" and in the sections "Ethnicity" & "Religion" is caused by the use of various statistical methods.

=== Religion ===
Census 2021 (1+ %)
Religion	Number	Fraction
Roman Catholic Church	424	75.99%
None	91	16.31%
Evangelical Church	24	4.3%
Total	558	

In year 2021 was 558 people by religion 424 from Roman Catholic Church, 91 from None, 24 from Evangelical Church, 5 from Christian Congregations in Slovakia, 4 from Other and not ascertained christian church, 3 from Eastern Orthodox Church, 3 from Not found out, 3 from Greek Catholic Church and 1 from Seventh-day Adventist Church.
