= Liptovská Kokava =

- Municipality
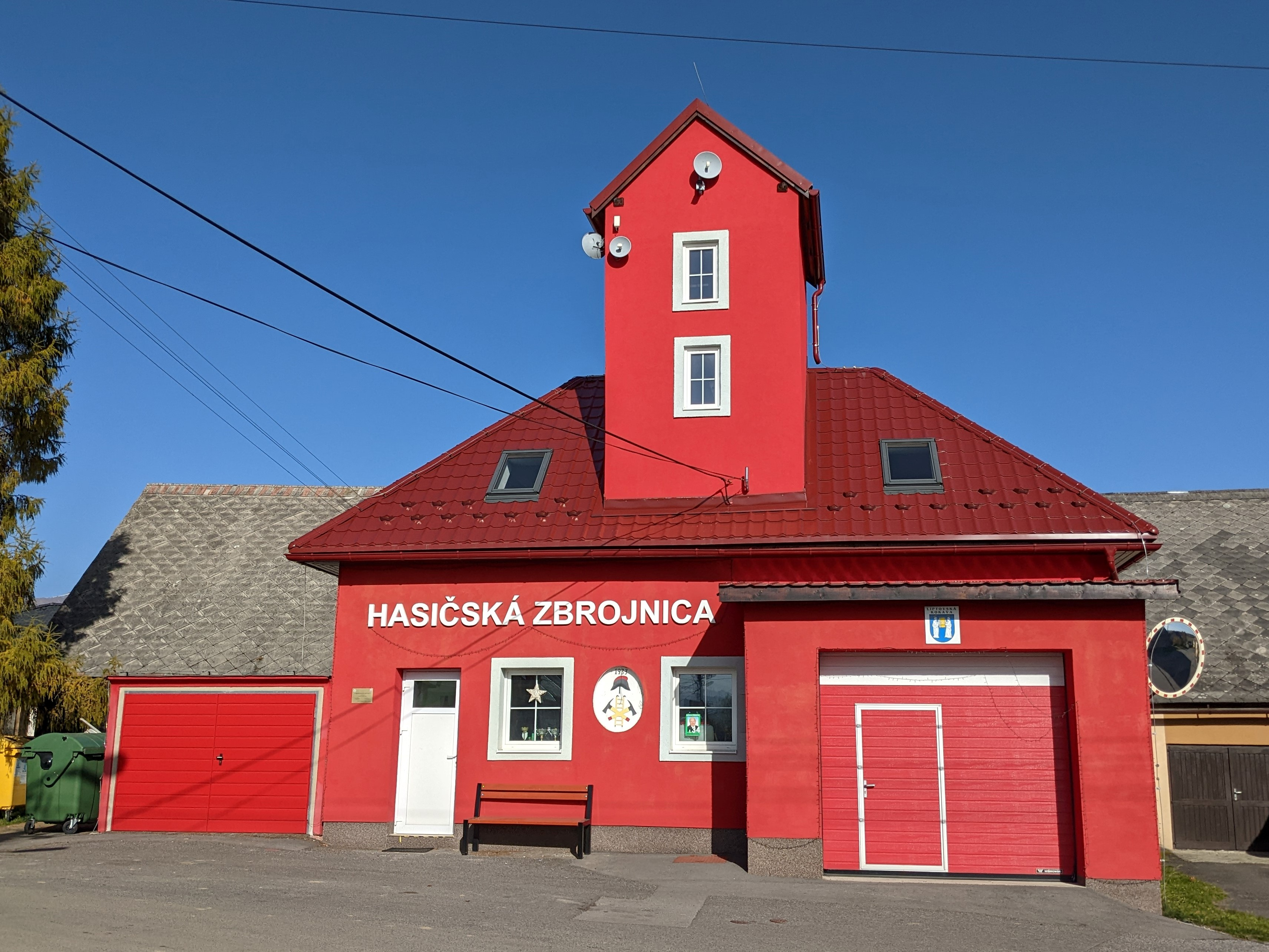

- Flag

- Location of Liptovská Kokava in the Žilina Region Location of Liptovská Kokava in Slovakia
- Coordinates: 49.08°N 19.82°E
- Country: Slovakia
- Region: Žilina Region
- District: Liptovský Mikuláš District
- First mentioned: 1469

Area
  - Total: 19.88 km^{2} (7.68 sq mi)
- Elevation: 796 m (2,612 ft)

Population (2025)
  - Total: 875
- Time zone: UTC+1 (CET)
  - Summer (DST): UTC+2 (CEST)
- Postal code: 324 4
- Area code: +421 44
- Vehicle registration plate (until 2022): LM
- Website: www.liptovskakokava.sk

Liptovská Kokava (Slovak: [ˈliptɔwskaː ˈkɔkaʋa]; Hungarian: Kokava) is a village and municipality in Liptovský Mikuláš District in the Žilina Region of northern Slovakia, at the foot of Kriváň, Slovakia's symbolic and often considered most beautiful mountain.

== History ==
In historical records the village was first mentioned in 1469, at the foot of Kriváň, Slovakia's symbolic and often considered most beautiful mountain.

The surname 'Kokavec' is believed to originate from this village.

Before the establishment of independent Czechoslovakia in 1918, Liptovská Kokava was part of Liptó County within the Kingdom of Hungary. From 1939 to 1945, it was part of the Slovak Republic.

== Geography ==
The municipality lies at an altitude of 796 metres (2,612 ft) and covers an area of 19.88 km^{2} (7.68 sq mi) (2025).

== Population ==
Population statistic (10 years)
Year	1995	2005	2015	2025
Count	1156	1034	975	875
Difference		−10.55%	−5.70%	−10.25%

Population statistic
Year	2024	2025
Count	882	875
Difference		−0.79%

It has a population of 875 people (31 December 2025).

=== Ethnicity ===
Census 2021 (1+ %)
Ethnicity	Number	Fraction
Slovak	914	97.85%
Not found out	12	1.28%
Total	934	

In year 2021 was 934 people by ethnicity 914 as Slovak, 12 as Not found out, 6 as Other, 5 as Czech, 3 as Hungarian, 2 as Jewish, 2 as Rusyn, 2 as German, 1 as Russian and 1 as Moravian.

Note on population: The difference values of population numbers in the table "Population statistic" and in the sections "Ethnicity" & "Religion" is caused by the use of various statistical methods.

=== Religion ===
Census 2021 (1+ %)
Religion	Number	Fraction
Evangelical Church	632	67.67%
None	136	14.56%
Roman Catholic Church	119	12.74%
Not found out	16	1.71%
Total	934	

In year 2021 was 934 people by religion 632 from Evangelical Church, 136 from None, 119 from Roman Catholic Church, 16 from Not found out, 5 from Other and not ascertained christian church, 5 from Other, 4 from Greek Catholic Church, 4 from Ad hoc movements, 3 from Islam, 3 from United Methodist Church, 1 from Jewish community, 1 from Paganism and natural spirituality, 1 from Jehovah's Witnesses, 1 from Christian Congregations in Slovakia, 1 from Seventh-day Adventist Church, 1 from Buddhism and 1 from Baptists Church.

== In popular culture ==
Liptovská Kokava was frequently referred in the 10th series of the historical drama Dunaj, k vašim službám as the birthplace of one of the protagonists - Lukáš Kudlička (Adam Bardy). No scenes were shot in the village.
