= Liptovská Anna =

- Municipality
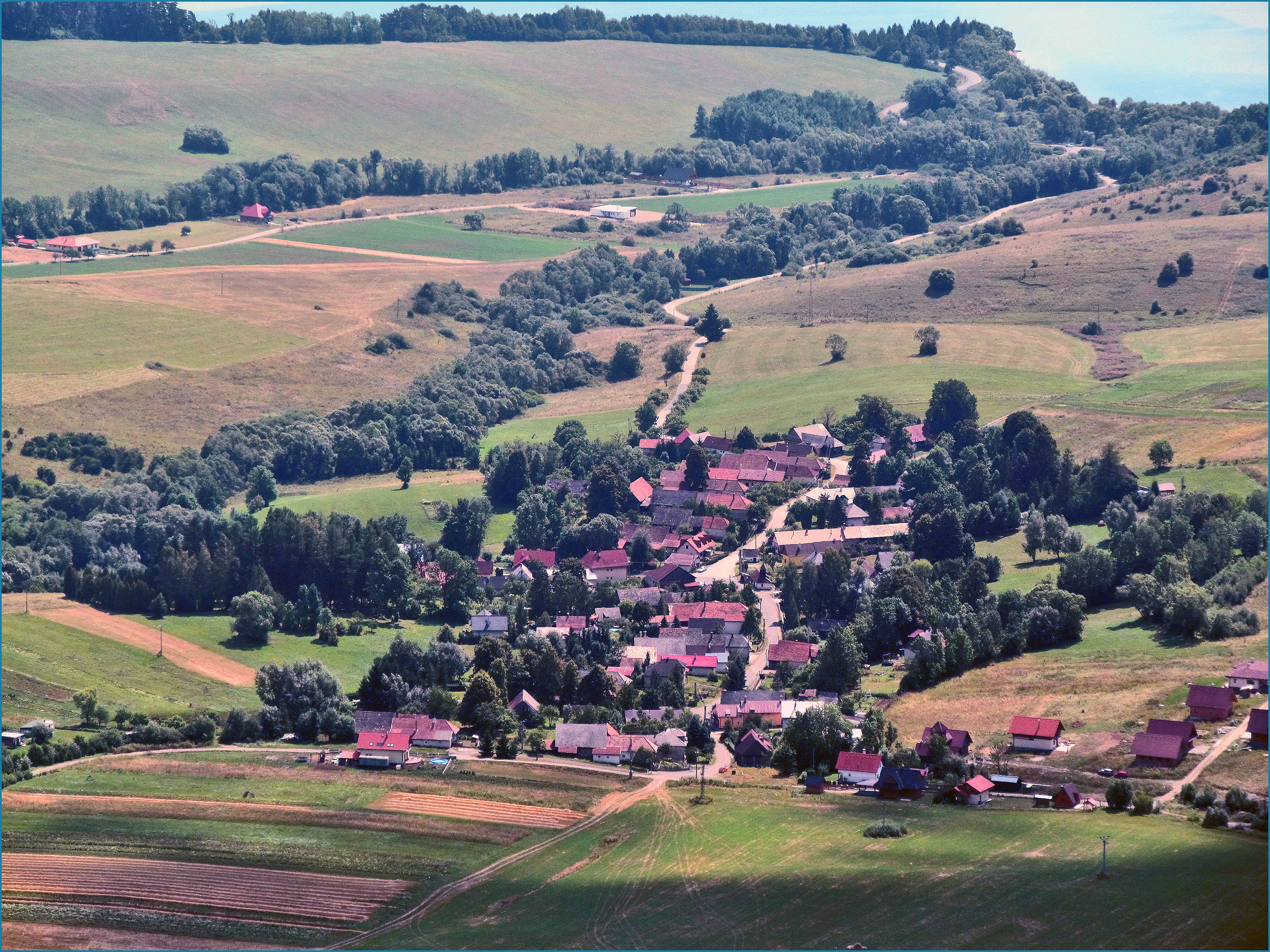

- Flag

- Location of Liptovská Anna in the Žilina Region Location of Liptovská Anna in Slovakia
- Coordinates: 49.15°N 19.47°E
- Country: Slovakia
- Region: Žilina Region
- District: Liptovský Mikuláš District
- First mentioned: 1396

Area
  - Total: 11.28 km^{2} (4.36 sq mi)
- Elevation: 666 m (2,185 ft)

Population (2025)
  - Total: 106
- Time zone: UTC+1 (CET)
  - Summer (DST): UTC+2 (CEST)
- Postal code: 322 3
- Area code: +421 44
- Vehicle registration plate (until 2022): LM

Liptovská Anna (Slovak: [ˈliptɔwskaː ˈanna]; Hungarian: Szentanna) is a village and municipality in Liptovský Mikuláš District in the Žilina Region of northern Slovakia.

== History ==
In historical records the village was first mentioned in 1396. Before the establishment of independent Czechoslovakia in 1918, it was part of Liptó County within the Kingdom of Hungary. From 1939 to 1945, it was part of the Slovak Republic.

== Geography ==
The municipality lies at an altitude of 666 metres (2,185 ft) and covers an area of 11.28 km^{2} (4.36 sq mi) (2025).

== Population ==
Population statistic (10 years)
Year	1995	2005	2015	2025
Count	101	88	82	106
Difference		−12.87%	−6.81%	+29.26%

Population statistic
Year	2024	2025
Count	104	106
Difference		+1.92%

It has a population of 106 people (31 December 2025).

=== Ethnicity ===
Census 2021 (1+ %)
Ethnicity	Number	Fraction
Slovak	91	95.78%
Not found out	4	4.21%
German	4	4.21%
Total	95	

In year 2021 was 95 people by ethnicity 91 as Slovak, 4 as Not found out and 4 as German.

Note on population: The difference values of population numbers in the table "Population statistic" and in the sections "Ethnicity" & "Religion" is caused by the use of various statistical methods.

=== Religion ===
Census 2021 (1+ %)
Religion	Number	Fraction
Evangelical Church	36	37.89%
None	36	37.89%
Roman Catholic Church	19	20%
Not found out	3	3.16%
United Methodist Church	1	1.05%
Total	95	

In year 2021 was 95 people by religion 36 from Evangelical Church, 36 from None, 19 from Roman Catholic Church, 3 from Not found out and 1 from United Methodist Church.
