= Bukovina, Liptovský Mikuláš District =

Village and municipality in Slovakia

Bukovina
- Municipality
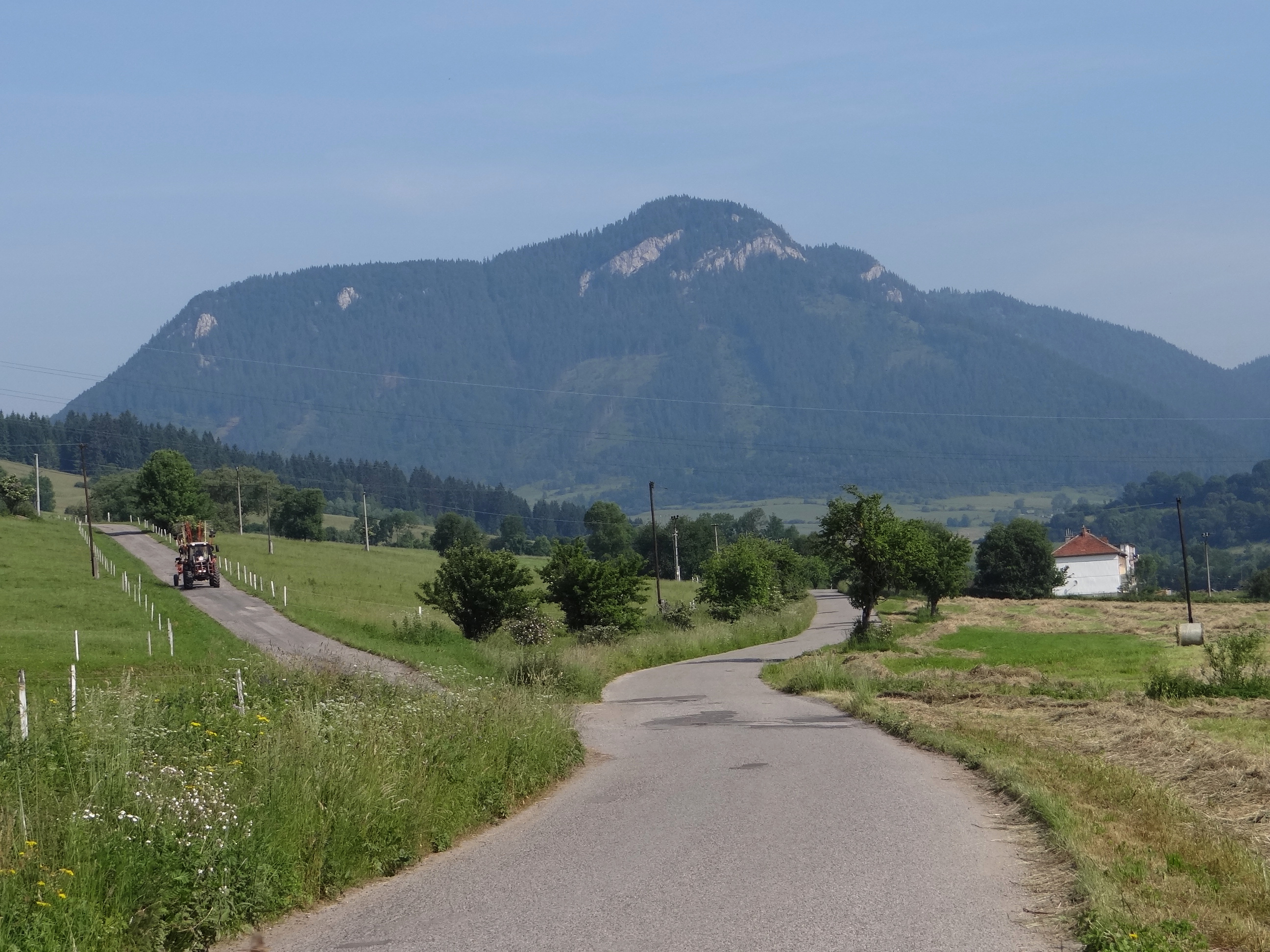

- Flag

- Location of Bukovina in the Žilina Region Location of Bukovina in Slovakia
- Coordinates: 49.1344°N 19.4706°E
- Country: Slovakia
- Region: Žilina Region
- District: Liptovský Mikuláš District
- First mentioned: 1297

Area
  - Total: 1.90 km^{2} (0.73 sq mi)
- Elevation: 591 m (1,939 ft)

Population (2025)
  - Total: 111
- Time zone: UTC+1 (CET)
  - Summer (DST): UTC+2 (CEST)
- Postal code: 322 3
- Area code: +421 44
- Vehicle registration plate (until 2022): LM
- Website: www.obecbukovina.sk

Bukovina (Hungarian: Liptóbakonya) is a village and municipality in Liptovský Mikuláš District in the Žilina Region of northern Slovakia.

== History ==
In historical records the village was first mentioned in 1297. Before the establishment of independent Czechoslovakia in 1918, it was part of Liptó County within the Kingdom of Hungary. From 1939 to 1945, it was part of the Slovak Republic.

== Geography ==
The municipality lies at an altitude of 591 metres (1,939 ft) and covers an area of 1.90 km^{2} (0.73 sq mi) (2025).

== Population ==
Population statistic (10 years)
Year	1995	2005	2015	2025
Count	142	131	101	111
Difference		−7.74%	−22.90%	+9.90%

Population statistic
Year	2024	2025
Count	113	111
Difference		−1.76%

It has a population of 111 people (31 December 2025).

=== Ethnicity ===
Census 2021 (1+ %)
Ethnicity	Number	Fraction
Slovak	108	96.42%
Not found out	4	3.57%
Total	112	

In year 2021 was 112 people by ethnicity 108 as Slovak, 4 as Not found out and 1 as Czech.

Note on population: The difference values of population numbers in the table "Population statistic" and in the sections "Ethnicity" & "Religion" is caused by the use of various statistical methods.

=== Religion ===
Census 2021 (1+ %)
Religion	Number	Fraction
Roman Catholic Church	47	41.96%
Evangelical Church	45	40.18%
None	13	11.61%
Not found out	4	3.57%
Total	112	

In year 2021 was 112 people by religion 47 from Roman Catholic Church, 45 from Evangelical Church, 13 from None, 4 from Not found out, 1 from Greek Catholic Church, 1 from Buddhism and 1 from Ad hoc movements.

== Genealogical resources ==
The records for genealogical research are available at the state archive "Statny Archiv in Bytca, Slovakia"

- Lutheran church records (births/marriages/deaths): 1783-1924 (parish B)

== See also ==
- List of municipalities and towns in Slovakia
