= Prosiek =

- Municipality
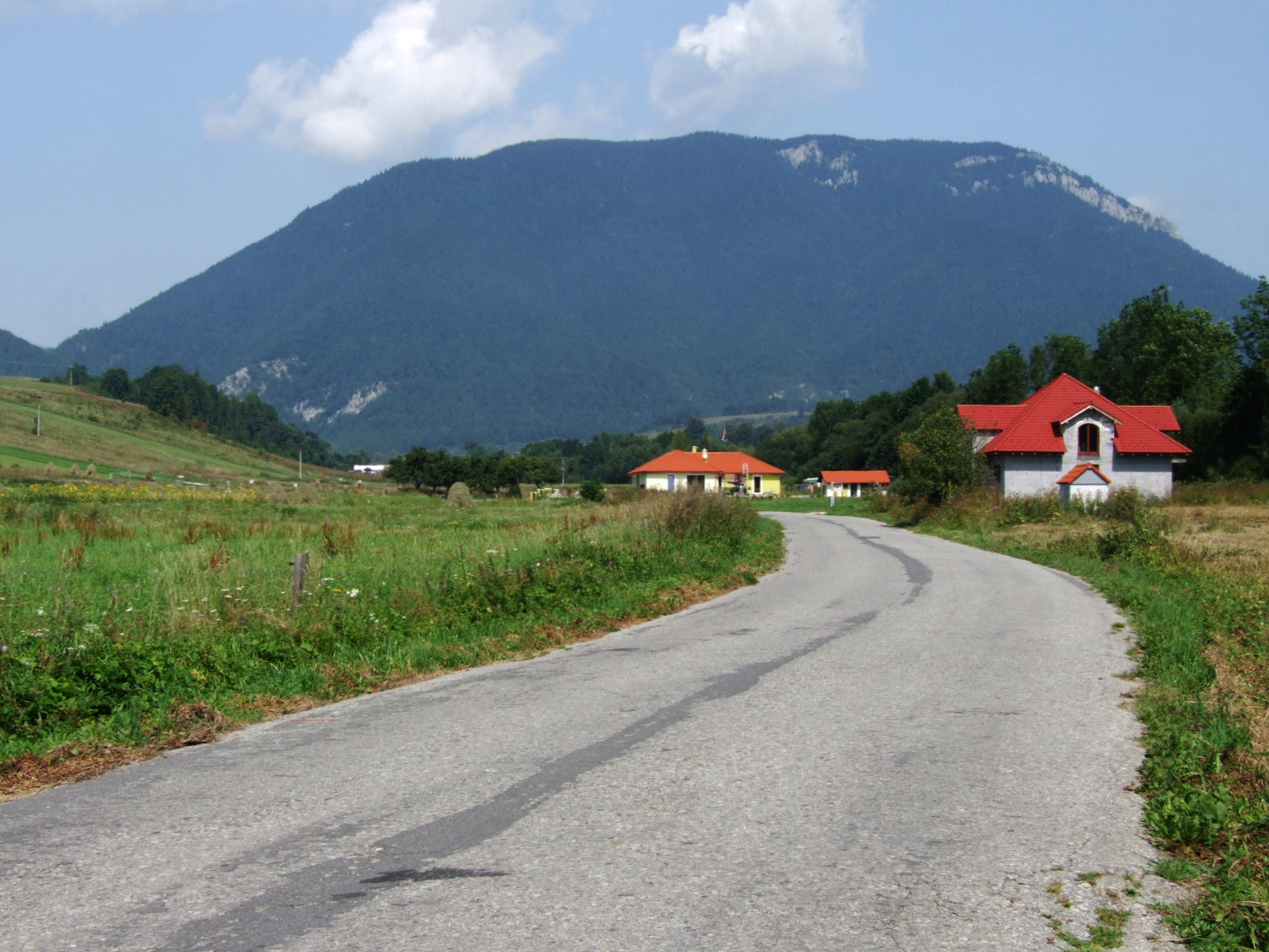

- Flag

- Location of Prosiek in the Žilina Region Location of Prosiek in Slovakia
- Coordinates: 49.15°N 19.50°E
- Country: Slovakia
- Region: Žilina Region
- District: Liptovský Mikuláš District
- First mentioned: 1280

Area
  - Total: 12.67 km^{2} (4.89 sq mi)
- Elevation: 589 m (1,932 ft)

Population (2025)
  - Total: 245
- Time zone: UTC+1 (CET)
  - Summer (DST): UTC+2 (CEST)
- Postal code: 322 3
- Area code: +421 44
- Vehicle registration plate (until 2022): LM
- Website: www.prosiek.sk

Prosiek (Hungarian: Prószék) is a village and municipality in Liptovský Mikuláš District in the Žilina Region of northern Slovakia.

== History ==
In historical records the village was first mentioned in 1280. Before the establishment of independent Czechoslovakia in 1918, it was part of Liptó County within the Kingdom of Hungary. From 1939 to 1945, it was part of the Slovak Republic.

== Geography ==
The municipality lies at an altitude of 589 metres (1,932 ft) and covers an area of 12.67 km^{2} (4.89 sq mi) (2025).

== Population ==
Population statistic (10 years)
| Year | 1995 | 2005 | 2015 | 2025 |
|---|---|---|---|---|
| Count | 201 | 186 | 203 | 245 |
| Difference | | −7.46% | +9.13% | +20.68% |

Population statistic
| Year | 2024 | 2025 |
|---|---|---|
| Count | 244 | 245 |
| Difference | | +0.40% |

It has a population of 245 people (31 December 2025).

=== Ethnicity ===
Census 2021 (1+ %)
| Ethnicity | Number | Fraction |
|---|---|---|
| Slovak | 216 | 95.57% |
| Not found out | 5 | 2.21% |
| Czech | 3 | 1.32% |
| Total | 226 | |

In year 2021 was 226 people by ethnicity 216 as Slovak, 5 as Not found out, 3 as Czech, 1 as Ukrainian and 1 as Other.

Note on population: The difference values of population numbers in the table "Population statistic" and in the sections "Ethnicity" & "Religion" is caused by the use of various statistical methods.

=== Religion ===
Census 2021 (1+ %)
| Religion | Number | Fraction |
|---|---|---|
| Roman Catholic Church | 113 | 50% |
| Evangelical Church | 63 | 27.88% |
| None | 39 | 17.26% |
| Not found out | 5 | 2.21% |
| Greek Catholic Church | 3 | 1.33% |
| Total | 226 | |

In year 2021 was 226 people by religion 113 from Roman Catholic Church, 63 from Evangelical Church, 39 from None, 5 from Not found out, 3 from Greek Catholic Church, 1 from Eastern Orthodox Church, 1 from Other and 1 from Ad hoc movements.
