= Malužiná =

Village and municipality in Slovakia

- Municipality
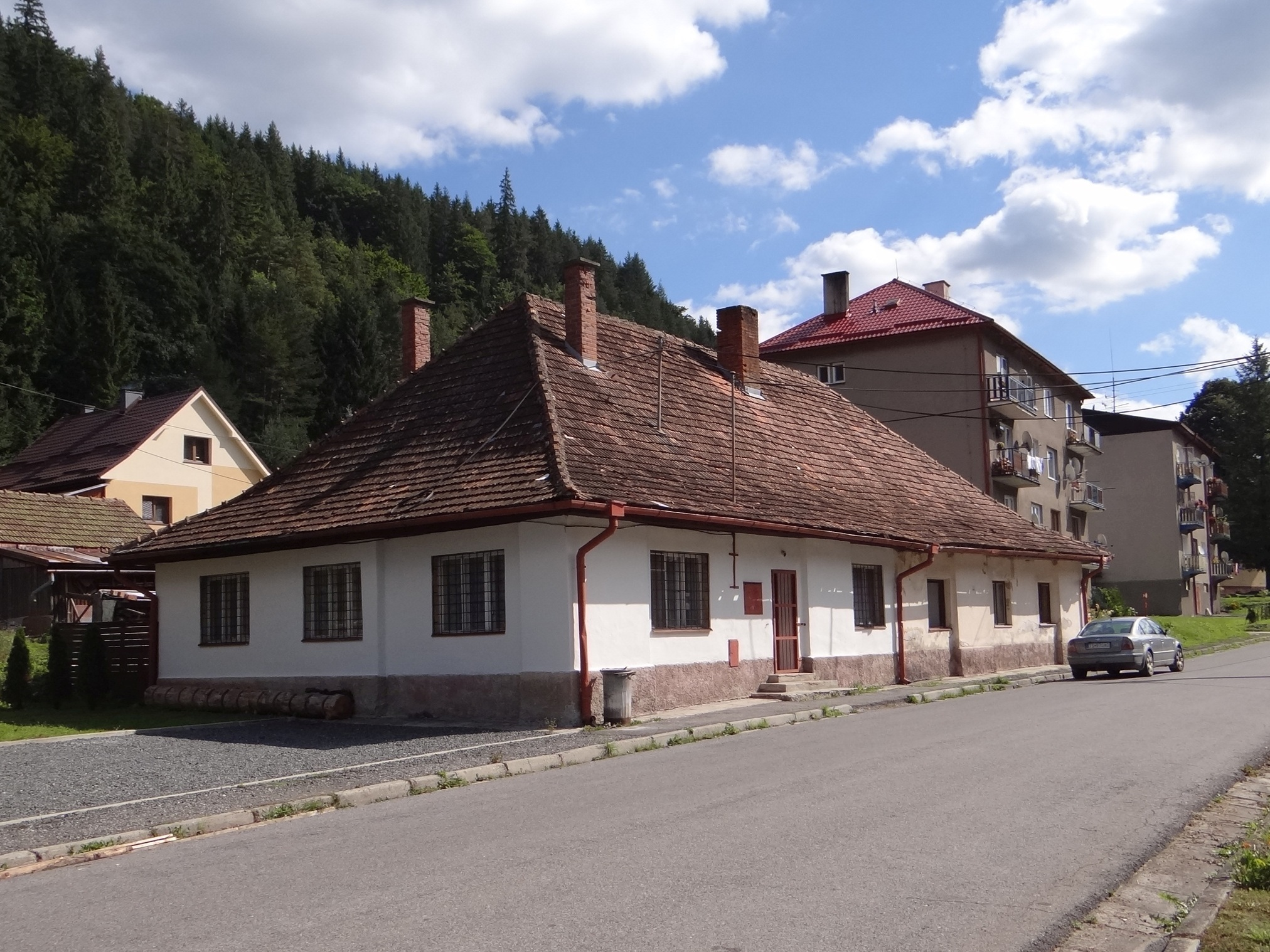

- Flag

- Location of Malužiná in the Žilina Region Location of Malužiná in Slovakia
- Coordinates: 48.98°N 19.78°E
- Country: Slovakia
- Region: Žilina Region
- District: Liptovský Mikuláš District
- First mentioned: 1750

Area
  - Total: 39.48 km^{2} (15.24 sq mi)
- Elevation: 732 m (2,402 ft)

Population (2025)
  - Total: 233
- Time zone: UTC+1 (CET)
  - Summer (DST): UTC+2 (CEST)
- Postal code: 323 4
- Area code: +421 44
- Vehicle registration plate (until 2022): LM
- Website: www.obecmaluzina.sk

Malužiná (Hungarian: Maluzsina) is a village and municipality in Liptovský Mikuláš District in the Žilina Region of northern Slovakia.

== History ==
In historical records the village was first mentioned in 1750. Before the establishment of independent Czechoslovakia in 1918, it was part of Liptó County within the Kingdom of Hungary. From 1939 to 1945, it was part of the Slovak Republic.

== Geography ==
The municipality lies at an altitude of 732 metres (2,402 ft) and covers an area of 39.48 km^{2} (15.24 sq mi) (2025).

== Population ==
Population statistic (10 years)
Year	1995	2005	2015	2025
Count	292	281	252	233
Difference		−3.76%	−10.32%	−7.53%

Population statistic
Year	2024	2025
Count	235	233
Difference		−0.85%

It has a population of 233 people (31 December 2025).

=== Ethnicity ===
Census 2021 (1+ %)
Ethnicity	Number	Fraction
Slovak	212	95.92%
Not found out	6	2.71%
Other	4	1.8%
Moravian	3	1.35%
Total	221	

In year 2021 was 221 people by ethnicity 212 as Slovak, 6 as Not found out, 4 as Other, 3 as Moravian, 2 as Russian, 1 as Czech, 1 as Romani, 1 as Romanian, 1 as Austrian, 1 as Polish and 1 as Hungarian.

Note on population: The difference values of population numbers in the table "Population statistic" and in the sections "Ethnicity" & "Religion" is caused by the use of various statistical methods.

=== Religion ===
Census 2021 (1+ %)
Religion	Number	Fraction
Roman Catholic Church	107	48.42%
None	55	24.89%
Evangelical Church	45	20.36%
Islam	4	1.81%
Eastern Orthodox Church	3	1.36%
Not found out	3	1.36%
Total	221	

In year 2021 was 221 people by religion 107 from Roman Catholic Church, 55 from None, 45 from Evangelical Church, 4 from Islam, 3 from Eastern Orthodox Church, 3 from Not found out, 2 from Jehovah's Witnesses and 2 from Greek Catholic Church.
