= Trstené =

- Municipality
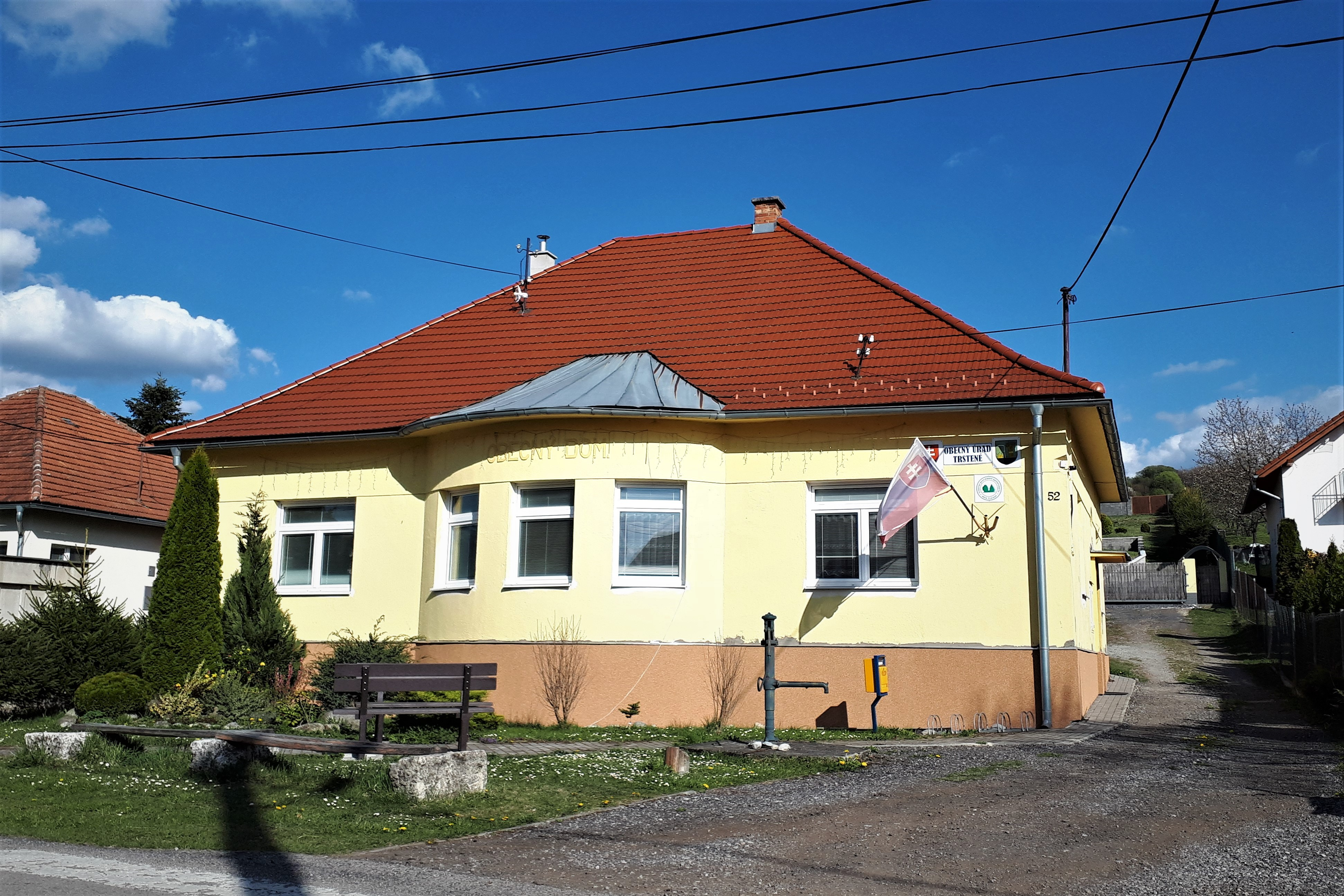

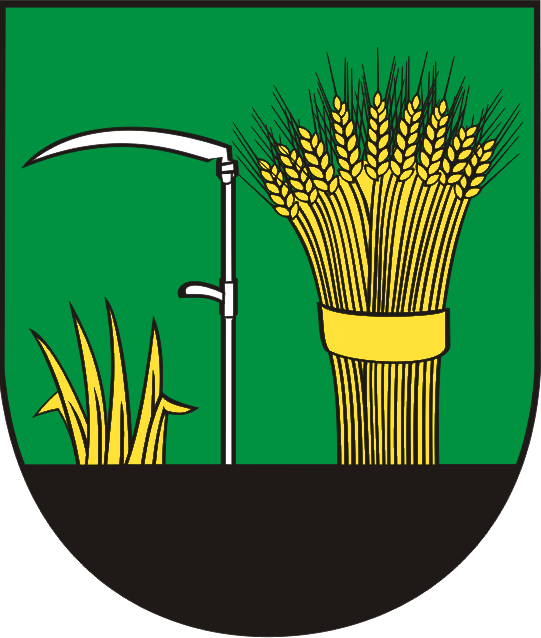
- Flag Coat of arms

- Location of Trstené in the Žilina Region Location of Trstené in Slovakia
- Coordinates: 49.12°N 19.62°E
- Country: Slovakia
- Region: Žilina Region
- District: Liptovský Mikuláš District
- First mentioned: 1269

Area
  - Total: 3.94 km^{2} (1.52 sq mi)
- Elevation: 635 m (2,083 ft)

Population (2025)
  - Total: 222
- Time zone: UTC+1 (CET)
  - Summer (DST): UTC+2 (CEST)
- Postal code: 322 1
- Area code: +421 44
- Vehicle registration plate (until 2022): LM
- Website: www.trstene.sk

Trstené (Hungarian: Nádasd) is a village and municipality in Liptovský Mikuláš District in the Žilina Region of northern Slovakia.

== History ==
In historical records the village was first mentioned in 1269. Before the establishment of independent Czechoslovakia in 1918, it was part of Liptó County within the Kingdom of Hungary. From 1939 to 1945, it was part of the Slovak Republic.

== Geography ==
The municipality lies at an altitude of 635 metres (2,083 ft) and covers an area of 3.94 km^{2} (1.52 sq mi) (2025).

== Population ==
Population statistic (10 years)
Year	1995	2005	2015	2025
Count	205	204	231	222
Difference		−0.48%	+13.23%	−3.89%

Population statistic
Year	2024	2025
Count	219	222
Difference		+1.36%

It has a population of 222 people (31 December 2025).

=== Ethnicity ===
Census 2021 (1+ %)
Ethnicity	Number	Fraction
Slovak	216	98.18%
Czech	3	1.36%
German	3	1.36%
Total	220	

In year 2021 was 220 people by ethnicity 216 as Slovak, 3 as Czech, 3 as German, 2 as Not found out, 1 as Rusyn and 1 as Russian.

Note on population: The difference values of population numbers in the table "Population statistic" and in the sections "Ethnicity" & "Religion" is caused by the use of various statistical methods.

=== Religion ===
Census 2021 (1+ %)
Religion	Number	Fraction
Roman Catholic Church	85	38.64%
None	67	30.45%
Evangelical Church	52	23.64%
Seventh-day Adventist Church	9	4.09%
Total	220	

In year 2021 was 220 people by religion 85 from Roman Catholic Church, 67 from None, 52 from Evangelical Church, 9 from Seventh-day Adventist Church, 2 from Paganism and natural spirituality, 2 from Greek Catholic Church, 1 from Eastern Orthodox Church, 1 from Not found out and 1 from Buddhism.
