= List of massacres in Slovakia =

The following is a list of massacres that have been occurred in the territory of today's Slovakia (numbers may be approximate):

Name	Date	Location	Deaths	Notes
Černová massacre	October 27, 1907	Csernova, Austria-Hungary (today part of Ružomberok, Slovakia)	15	52 injured. Perpetrators were gendarmes of Kingdom of Hungary, firing into a crowd of Slovak people gathering for the consecration of the local Catholic church
Prešporok Massacre	February 12, 1919	Prešporok, First Czechoslovak Republic (de facto) (today Bratislava, Slovakia)	9	32 severely injured. Victims were German and Hungarian protestors organised by Social Democrats, shortly after the city was occupied by Czechoslovak forces
Nemčice massacre	11 September 1944	Nemčice, Slovak Republic	53	Perpetrated by Einsatzkommando 14. Victims were Slovak Jews, including women and children.
Hájniky massacre	16-17 September 1944	Between Hájniky and Rybáre (currently Sliač), Slovak Republic	11-12	Perpetrated by partisans of 1st Czechoslovak brigade "M. R. Štefánik". Among the murdered was also a priest and member of Slovak parliament, Anton Šalát.
Sklené massacre	21 September 1944	Sklené, Slovak Republic	187	Perpetrated by 3rd company of 8th troop of 1st Czechoslovak partisan brigade of J. V. Stalin, mostly of Slovak ethnicity. German inhabitants of Sklené were loaded to freight train and afterwards murdered and buried in mass grave near the village.
Martin massacre	3 October 1944	Turčiansky Svätý Martin, Slovak Republic	48	Perpetrated by Einsatzkommando 14. Victims were murdered because of their actual or alleged involvement in partisan warfare.
Kľak Valley Massacre	21 January 1945	Kľak and Ostrý Grúň, Slovak Republic	148	Soldiers of German anti-partisan unit Abwehrgruppe 218 (Edelweiss) and paramilitary Heimatschutz have perpetrated a massacre of villagers of two villages for their alleged help to partisans. Afterwards they burned down both villages.
Devínska Nová Ves massacre	10 June 1945	Devínska Nová Ves, Third Czechoslovak Republic	42	German prisoners of war were murdered by the soldiers of Red Army while being transported on the train to the USSR as a retaliation for the death of Soviet soldier.
Kolbasov massacre	6 December 1945	Kolbasov, Third Czechoslovak Republic	15	Victims were Slovak Jews who survived the Holocaust. Perpetrators unknown, Ukrainian Insurgent Army blamed.
Dunajská Streda massacre	March 25, 1999	Dunajská Streda, Slovakia	10	3 armed men stormed a bar and shot dead 10 members of a mafia that terrorized Dunajská Streda.
Bratislava shooting	August 30, 2010	Devínska Nová Ves, Bratislava, Slovakia	8	17 injured
2022 Bratislava shooting	October 12, 2022	Staré Mesto Bratislava, Slovakia	3	1 injured

== See also ==
- Crime in Slovakia
- List of massacres in the Czech Republic
