= Bratislava shooting =

Bratislava shooting may refer to:

- 2010 Bratislava shooting
- 2022 Bratislava shooting
