= Konská, Liptovský Mikuláš District =

Village and municipality in Slovakia

Konská
- Municipality
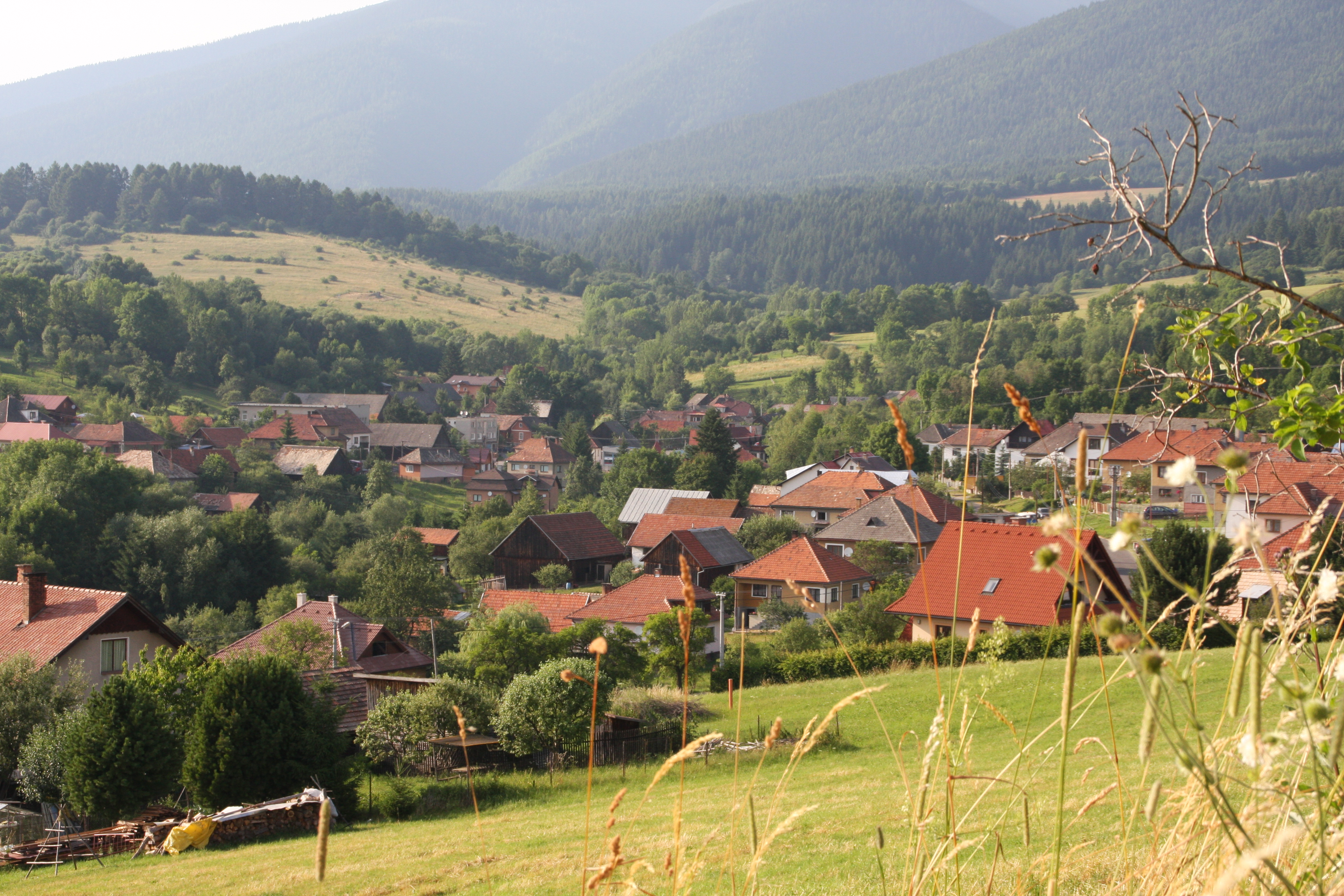

- Flag

- Location of Konská in the Žilina Region Location of Konská in Slovakia
- Coordinates: 49°07′06″N 19°43′00″E
- Country: Slovakia
- Region: Žilina Region
- District: Liptovský Mikuláš District
- First mentioned: 1357

Area
  - Total: 11.80 km^{2} (4.56 sq mi)
- Elevation: 755 m (2,477 ft)

Population (2025)
  - Total: 218
- Time zone: UTC+1 (CET)
  - Summer (DST): UTC+2 (CEST)
- Postal code: 310 4
- Area code: +421 44
- Vehicle registration plate (until 2022): LM
- Website: konskaliptov.sk

Konská (Hungarian: Konszka) is a village and municipality in Liptovský Mikuláš District in the Žilina Region of northern Slovakia.

== History ==
In historical records the village was first mentioned in 1357. Before the establishment of independent Czechoslovakia in 1918, it was part of Liptó County within the Kingdom of Hungary. From 1939 to 1945, it was part of the Slovak Republic.

== Geography ==
The municipality lies at an altitude of 755 metres (2,477 ft) and covers an area of 11.80 km^{2} (4.56 sq mi) (2025).

== Population ==
Population statistic (10 years)
| Year | 1995 | 2005 | 2015 | 2025 |
|---|---|---|---|---|
| Count | 252 | 242 | 218 | 218 |
| Difference | | −3.96% | −9.91% | −1.42% |

Population statistic
| Year | 2024 | 2025 |
|---|---|---|
| Count | 231 | 218 |
| Difference | | −5.62% |

It has a population of 218 people (31 December 2025).

=== Ethnicity ===
Census 2021 (1+ %)
| Ethnicity | Number | Fraction |
|---|---|---|
| Slovak | 218 | 97.75% |
| Czech | 5 | 2.24% |
| Not found out | 4 | 1.79% |
| Total | 223 | |

In year 2021 was 223 people by ethnicity 218 as Slovak, 5 as Czech and 4 as Not found out.

Note on population: The difference values of population numbers in the table "Population statistic" and in the sections "Ethnicity" & "Religion" is caused by the use of various statistical methods.

=== Religion ===
Census 2021 (1+ %)
| Religion | Number | Fraction |
|---|---|---|
| Evangelical Church | 118 | 52.91% |
| Roman Catholic Church | 47 | 21.08% |
| None | 46 | 20.63% |
| Not found out | 5 | 2.24% |
| Baptists Church | 5 | 2.24% |
| Total | 223 | |

In year 2021 was 223 people by religion 118 from Evangelical Church, 47 from Roman Catholic Church, 46 from None, 5 from Not found out, 5 from Baptists Church, 1 from Other and not ascertained christian church and 1 from Other.

== Genealogical resources ==
The records for genealogical research are available at the state archive "Statny Archiv in Bytca, Slovakia"

- Roman Catholic church records (births/marriages/deaths): 1729-1895 (parish B)
- Lutheran church records (births/marriages/deaths): 1783-1951 (parish B)

== See also ==
- List of municipalities and towns in Slovakia
