= Čerenčany =

Čerenčany Cserencsény
- Municipality
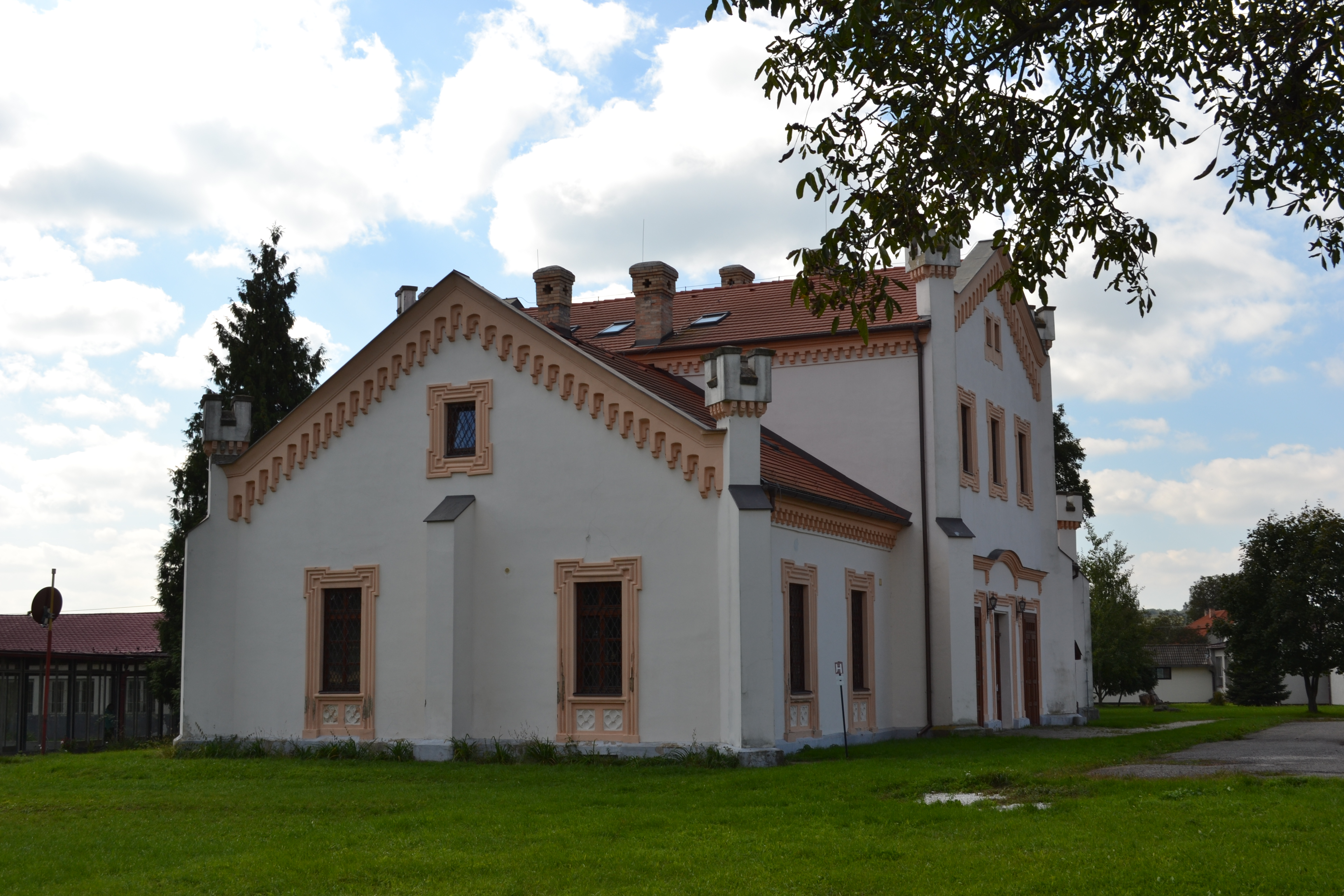
- Mansion in Čerenčany

- Flag

- Location of Čerenčany in the Banská Bystrica Region Location of Čerenčany in Slovakia
- Coordinates: 48.41°N 19.99°E
- Country: Slovakia
- Region: Banská Bystrica Region
- District: Rimavská Sobota District
- First mentioned: 1334

Area
  - Total: 5.06 km^{2} (1.95 sq mi)
- Elevation: 214 m (702 ft)

Population (2025)
  - Total: 528
- Time zone: UTC+1 (CET)
  - Summer (DST): UTC+2 (CEST)
- Postal code: 979 01
- Area code: +421 47
- Vehicle registration plate (until 2022): RS
- Website: www.cerencany.sk

Čerenčany (earlier Cšerencšány; Hungarian: Cserencsény), is a village and municipality in the Rimavská Sobota District of the Banská Bystrica Region of southern Slovakia. During the past several years the village recorded a growth in population, due to which new houses and condominiums were built. The village is gradually taking the name of a satellite village in Rimavská Sobota. Most important sightseeing in the village is classical evangelical church built in 1831.

== Geography ==
The municipality lies at an altitude of 214 metres (702 ft) and covers an area of 5.06 km^{2} (1.95 sq mi) (2025).

== Population ==
Population statistic (10 years)
Year	1995	2005	2015	2025
Count	454	505	557	528
Difference		+11.23%	+10.29%	−5.20%

Population statistic
Year	2024	2025
Count	532	528
Difference		−0.75%

It has a population of 528 people (31 December 2025).

=== Ethnicity ===
Census 2021 (1+ %)
Ethnicity	Number	Fraction
Slovak	512	93.43%
Hungarian	29	5.29%
Not found out	13	2.37%
Total	548	

In year 2021 was 548 people by ethnicity 512 as Slovak, 29 as Hungarian, 13 as Not found out, 2 as Czech, 2 as Polish, 2 as Croatian, 1 as German and 1 as Other.

Note on population: The difference values of population numbers in the table "Population statistic" and in the sections "Ethnicity" & "Religion" is caused by the use of various statistical methods.

=== Religion ===
Census 2021 (1+ %)
Religion	Number	Fraction
None	241	43.98%
Roman Catholic Church	208	37.96%
Evangelical Church	66	12.04%
Not found out	13	2.37%
Calvinist Church	8	1.46%
Total	548	

In year 2021 was 548 people by religion 241 from None, 208 from Roman Catholic Church, 66 from Evangelical Church, 13 from Not found out, 8 from Calvinist Church, 5 from Greek Catholic Church, 2 from Other, 1 from Jehovah's Witnesses, 1 from Christian Congregations in Slovakia, 1 from United Methodist Church, 1 from Buddhism and 1 from Ad hoc movements.

== Notable personalities ==
- Samuel Kollár, writer
- Miloš Krno, writer

== Genealogical resources ==
The records for genealogical research are available at the state archive "Statny Archiv in Banska Bystrica, Slovakia"

- Roman Catholic church records (births/marriages/deaths): 1771-1896 (parish B)
- Lutheran church records (births/marriages/deaths): 1713-1896 (parish A)
- Reformated church records (births/marriages/deaths): 1771-1896 (parish B)

== See also ==
- List of municipalities and towns in Slovakia
