= Černová massacre =

1907 gendarmes shooting of civilians in Hungary

Coordinates: 49.091742°N 19.255686°E

The Černová massacre (or Černová tragedy, Slovak: Černovská tragédia, Hungarian: Csernovai tragédia or Csernova Affair) was a shooting that took place in Csernova, Kingdom of Hungary (today Černová, part of Ružomberok, Slovakia) on 27 October 1907 in which 15 people were killed and many were wounded after gendarmes fired into a crowd of people gathering for the consecration of the local Catholic church. The shootings sparked protests in European and American press and turned the world's attention to the treatment of minorities in the Hungarian part of Austria-Hungary.

== Outline of the events ==
=== Pretext ===
On the initiative of Andrej Hlinka, the Slovak parish priest of nearby Ružomberok (Rózsahegy) and a native of Černová, people of the city decided to raise money for the construction of a new church. The locals raised 80,000 crowns, and minor donations were received from Slovak Americans as well. The construction started in April 1907 and by the autumn, the church was ready for consecration.

The locals wanted the church to be consecrated by Hlinka, who had been suspended by Bishop Sándor Párvyat when he was sentenced to two years of imprisonment due to his pan-Slavic agitation during the election campaign of 1906 and the subsequent conviction of incitement. Hlinka had no knowledge of the consecration. The people of Černová demanded the consecration to be postponed until Hlinka would be able to perform the ceremony. The Bishop denied their request and two Hungarian-speaking priests were appointed in his stead: first, Canon Anton Kurimsky, and after his refusal, Dean Martin Pazurik of Likavka.

The ceremony was to take place on 27 October 1907. The official procession arrived at the village accompanied by a squad of 15 gendarmes. This was protested against by the locals, who attempted to block the way inside the church to prevent Pazurik from consecrating it. The demonstration was peaceful in nature although some accounts report stone-throwing at a member of the gendarme escort. Outnumbered and in panic the gendarme leader sergeant Ján Ladiczky, an ethnic Slovak, ordered his squad to open fire into the crowd without prior warning killing 15 of the protesting villagers, seriously wounding 12 and lightly injuring 40.

The majority of the members of the Hungarian gendarmes involved in the shooting were of Slovak origin (five of the total seven), and they performed the shooting not because of any ethnic reason, but because they were obligated to do so according to the rules of their service.

== Consequences ==
Hlinka's appeal against his 1906 verdict was rejected, thus, on 30 November 1907 Hlinka started to serve his jail term in the Csillagbörtön (Star Prison), Szeged. On the other hand, Hlinka appealed with success his suspension to the Holy See, so it was cancelled on 8 April 1909. When Hlinka left the prison, Bishop Párvy appointed him again to his Ružomberok parish, and Hlinka consecrated the church in Černová with Párvy's consent. The tragedy sparked protests in the European and US press and it turned the world's attention to the attitude to the minorities in Hungary.

== See also ==
- List of massacres in Slovakia
- Magyarization
