= Andrej Hlinka =

Slovak priest and politician (1864–1938)

Monsignor Andrej Hlinka
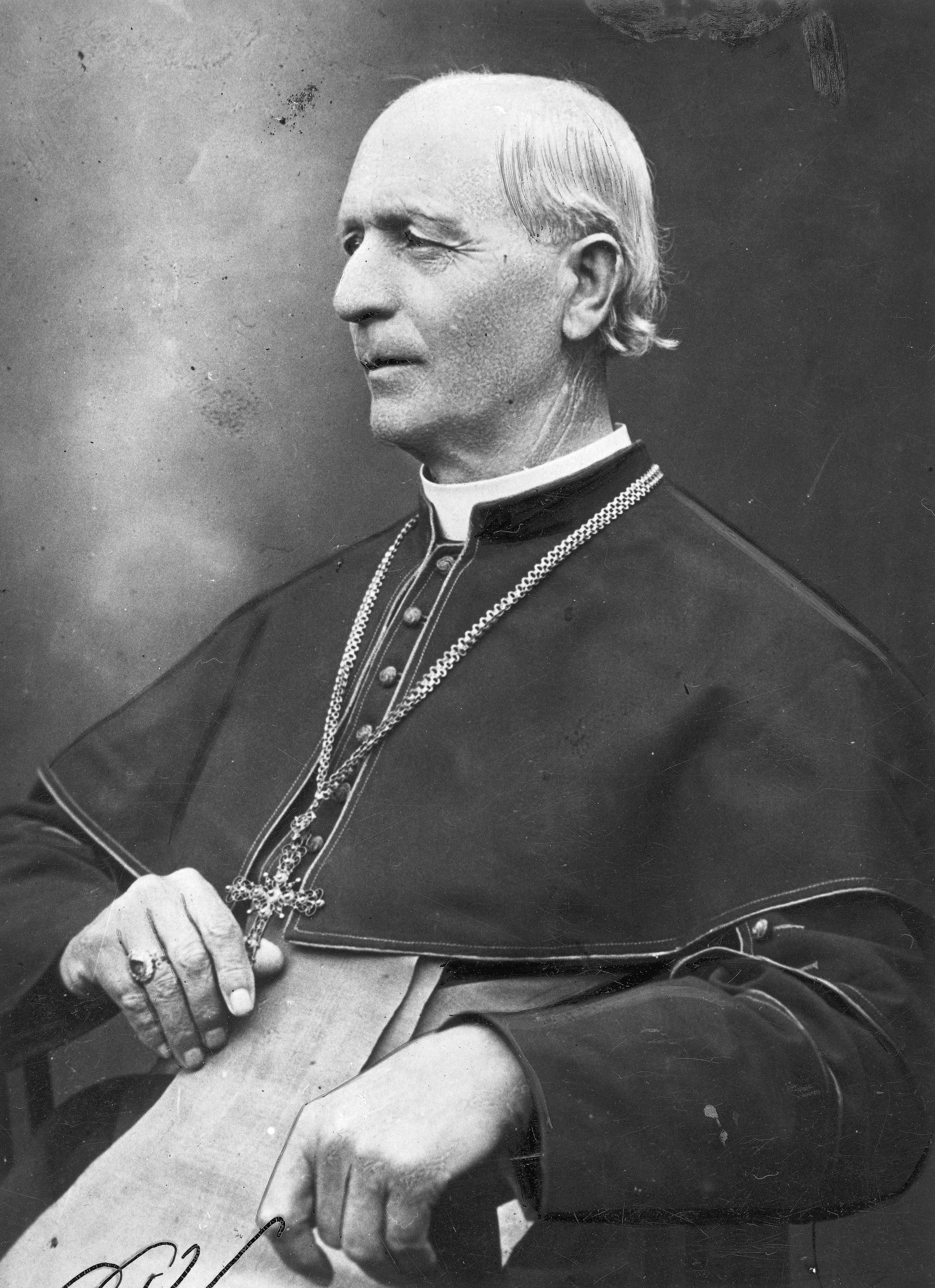
- Hlinka in 1937
- Title: Papal chamberlain, protonotary apostolic

Personal life
- Born: 27 September 1864 Csernova, Rózsahegy, Kingdom of Hungary, Austrian Empire
- Died: 16 August 1938 (aged 73) Ružomberok, Czechoslovakia
- Political party: Catholic People's Party (until 1901); Slovak National Party; Slovak People's Party (1914–1938)

Religious life
- Religion: Catholic
- Institute: St. Vojtech Fellowship

Andrej Hlinka (born 27 September 1864 – 16 August 1938) was a Slovak Roman Catholic priest and politician who was one of the most important Slovak public activists in Czechoslovakia before World War II. He was the leader of the Hlinka's Slovak People's Party, a papal chamberlain, protonotary apostolic, member of the National Assembly of Czechoslovakia, and chairman of the St. Vojtech Fellowship (a religious publication organization).

== Life ==
Born in Černová (today part of the city of Ružomberok) in the Liptov County of Slovakia, which was under the rule of the Kingdom of Hungary), Hlinka graduated with a degree in theology from Spišská Kapitula and was ordained priest in 1889. He tried to improve the social status of his parishioners, fought against alcoholism and organized educational lectures and theatre performances. He founded credit and food bank associations to help ordinary people and wrote a manual how to found further such organizations.

In his political views, he was a strong defender of Catholic ethics against all secularizing tendencies connected with economic and political liberalism of Hungary at the end of the 19th and the beginning of the 20th century. This was a similar position to that of the Hungarian Catholic People's Party, led by Count Zichy, leading Hlinka to become an activist of the party. However, as the party disregarded Slovak demands Hlinka eventually left and, along with František Skyčák, founded the Slovak People's Party.

He gained widespread popularity thanks to his social activities. In 1905, he was elected parson in Ružomberok against the wishes of his Hungarian bishop Sándor Párvy. In the Hungarian parliamentary elections of 1906, he supported Slovak candidate Vavro Šrobár and featured in favor of the Slovak national movement. His activities met with disapproval from the church hierarchy, which suspended him as a priest. On 27 June 1906 he was imprisoned and later convicted of sedition. While Hlinka was suspended and waited for admission to prison, Bishop Sándor Párvy ordered the consecration of a church in Černová, the construction of which Hlinka had been instrumental in, by Hungarian-speaking priests. This was met with protests and resistance from the local population and led to the Černová massacre, which brought international attention to the situation of the Slovak minority in the Kingdom of Hungary. In prison, Hlinka led the translation of the Old Testament into the Slovak language. His friends worked on the rehabilitation of his public image and Hlinka, who complained of his suspension to the Holy See, finally won the case against the bishop.

In 1907, he founded the Ľudová banka (People's Bank) and became the chairman of the board three years later.

The Slovak People's Party was separated from the Slovak National Party in 1913. Hlinka became party chairman and remained in this position for the rest of his life.

At the end of World War I, Hlinka significantly contributed to the creation of Czechoslovakia. On the confidential meeting of the Slovak National Party on 24 May 1918, he took a clear position and ended a prolonged discussion of undecided participants ("Thousand years old marriage with the Hungarians didn't work out. We have to divorce."). He became a member of the Slovak National Council and signed the Martin Declaration, which advocated a political union with the Czech nation. In the early period of Czechoslovakia, when a part of the Church hierarchy still preferred the Kingdom of Hungary, he intensively lobbied for the new state.

Hlinka quickly became disappointed by the undemocratic methods of his former colleague Vavro Šrobár (Minister-plenipotentiary for Slovakia affairs), some anti-religious actions, and the unequal position of Slovakia. He complained to the Prime Minister and warned him that he would escalate these problems to the Paris Peace Conference. Hlinka believed that the problems could be solved on the basis of the Pittsburgh Agreement which promised autonomy of Slovakia within Czechoslovakia. On 28 August 1918, he traveled to Paris under the influence of František Jehlička, whom Hlinka blindly trusted. Hlinka then distributed a memorandum about Slovakia to journalists and diplomats, but failed to meet with key decision makers. Hlinka, who arrived on a passport issued by Poland on a name of "Josef Berger", was arrested and hustled out of Paris by French police. This poorly timed and organized journey could have seriously harmed the interests of Czechoslovakia at the conference and damaged the image of Slovak autonomists. Except Hlinka, all participants stayed abroad and later worked for Hungarian irredentism. Even the Slovak People's Party distanced itself from the actions of its leader. Hlinka was imprisoned and politically isolated and the ability of SĽS to act was limited.

Regardless of the issue, Hlinka remained popular among voters of the Slovak People's Party. In April 1920, he was elected to the Czechoslovak Parliament and released from prison. Thereafter, he led the struggle for autonomy and for acknowledgment of an independent Slovak nation for almost 20 years. His motivation was based on religious and linguistic grounds. Hlinka accepted the idea of the common Czechoslovak political nation but believed that centralism and ethnic Czechoslovakism threatened Slovak interests and their national and cultural identity ("We are for the common state of Czechs and Slovaks, but we are for the application of national individuality of both constituent nations.") His party quickly became the most popular party in Slovakia with potentially around 25%–35% of popular support.

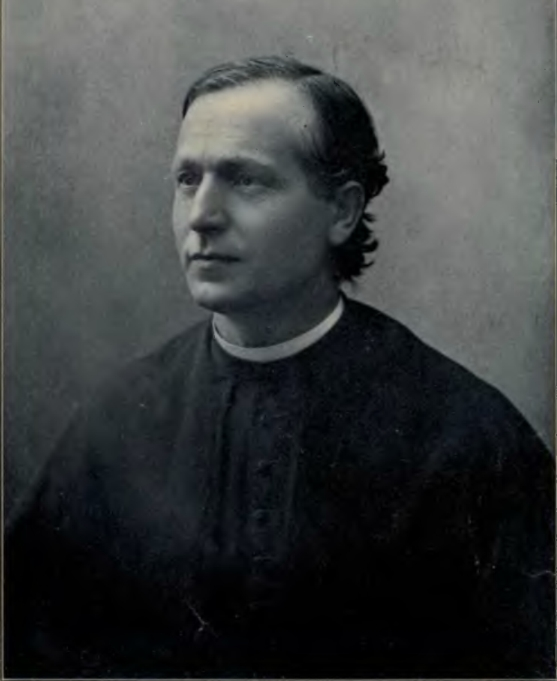
Hlinka in 1908

Hlinka was known for his charisma, temperament, stubbornness, and sharp tongue, which made him a difficult partner for negotiation. Hlinka regularly insulted his opponents and was often criticized for primitive behavior. The lack of higher education led him to an uncritical admiration of some of his questionable coworkers. This was especially the case of Vojtech Tuka who several times undermined the interests of the party, but preserved Hlinka's trust regardless of the resistance of the HSLS.

At the end of his life, Hlinka was more a living symbol of the party than a real policymaker. In the 1930s, the party gradually moved closer to authoritarian and undemocratic political ideas. Hlinka sympathized with authoritarian regimes like Salazar's Portugal or Dollfuss' Austria, both states in which Catholic clericalism played a central role. During the final years of his life, his party was internally divided into two wings – the conservatives led by Catholic priest Jozef Tiso and the radicals, mostly young, dissatisfied members. Hlinka tried to balance them and for tactical reasons supported them alternately. Hlinka, who never understood foreign policy well, was in favor of cooperation with Konrad Henlein and János Esterházy.

On 5 June 1938, Hlinka made a speech at a demonstration in Bratislava where he again raised a demand for Slovak autonomy. He made another public speech calling for autonomy on August 7th despite failing health due to complications from advanced kidney cancer. His death on August 16th was the cause of much mourning throughout Slovakia. Quite ironically, Hlinka's vision of a separate Slovakia was belatedly achieved in a somewhat backdoor fashion less than two months later after the signing of the Munich Agreement, in which Czechoslovakia was absorbed into the German sphere of influence and the Sudetenland annexed. It was in these conditions, especially the loss of the Czech borderland and the threat of Hungarian territorial demands, that the HSLS was able to exploit the weakness of the state and declare autonomy on 6 October 1938. However, true independence for Slovakia was not achieved until after the dissolution of the USSR and the establishment of the modern independent country on 1 January 1993, over 54 years after Hlinka's passing.

== Legacy ==
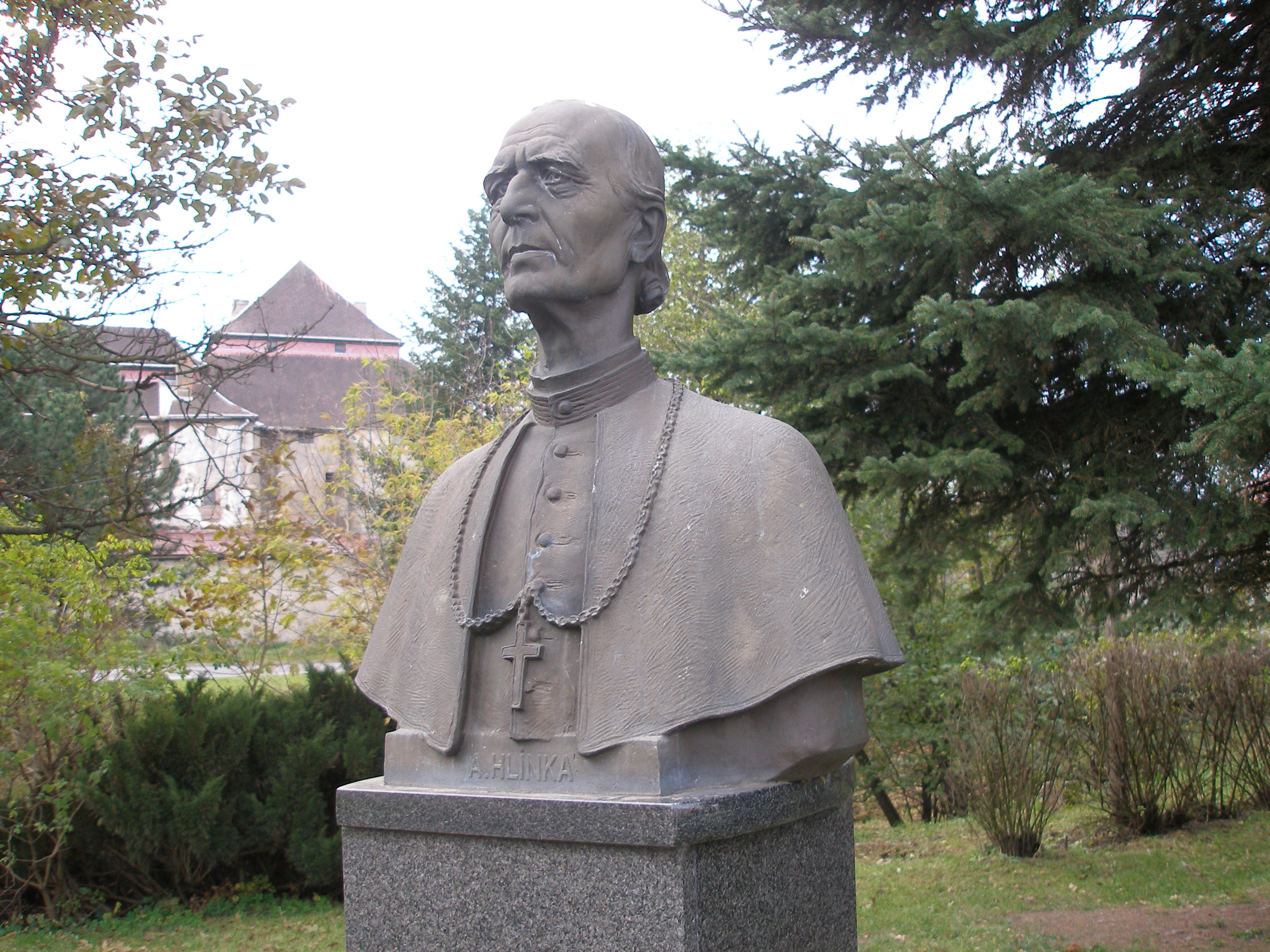
Andrej Hlinka statue in Prešov

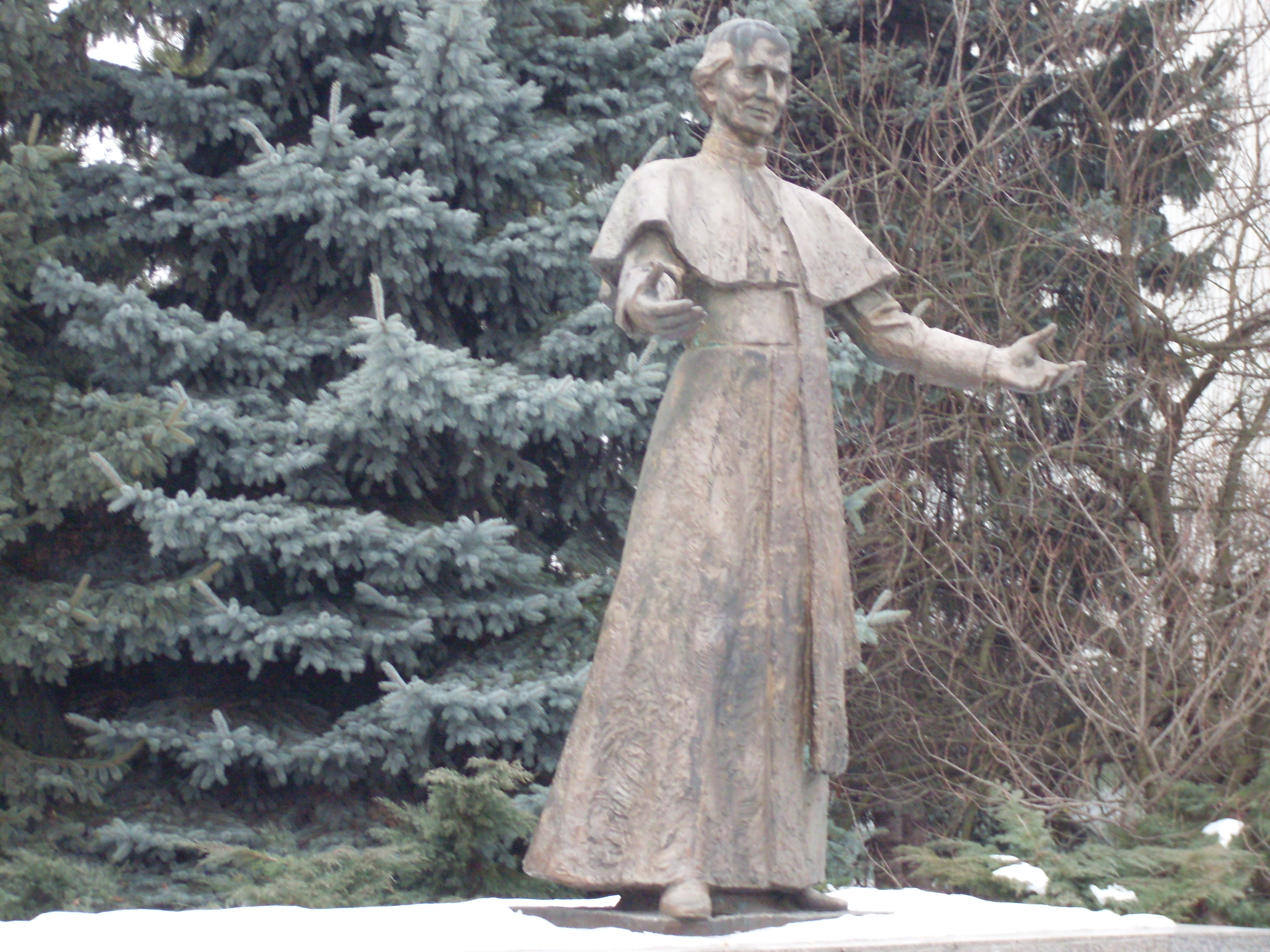
Andrej Hlinka statue in Žilina

During the first Slovak Republic, a client state of Nazi Germany (1939–1945), Hlinka was considered by the regime as a national hero. Jozef Tiso, his deputy and successor in Hlinka's Slovak People's Party, became the president of the fascist first Slovak Republic. The Hlinka Guard, a militia maintained by the Hlinka's Slovak People's Party created shortly before Hlinka's death, later participated in the Holocaust in Slovakia.

In Communist Czechoslovakia, Hlinka was portrayed as a "clerofascist".

After the fall of communism, Hlinka re-emerged as a respected public figure, mostly to nationalist sympathizers and to Christian democratic organisations, while others seem mostly indifferent towards Hlinka's memory. Hlinka's image could be found on the Slovak 1000-crown banknote, before Slovakia's adoption of the Euro in 2009. A motion in the Parliament of Slovakia to proclaim him "father of the nation" nearly passed in September 2007.

Today, Andrej Hlinka is mostly commemorated in his native Černová, where his house can be found and remains open to the public. In 1990, the Mausoleum of Andrej Hlinka in Ružomberok was reopened.

== Sources ==
- Krajčovičová, Natália (2004). "Andrej Hlinka v slovenskej politike" [Andrej Hlinka in the Slovak Policy]. Historická revue (in Slovak). Bratislava: Slovenský archeologický a historický ústav. ISSN 1335-6550. Archived from the original on 12 September 2011.
- Vašš, Martin (2011). Slovenská otázka v 1. ČSR (1918–1938) [The Slovak Question in the 1st Czechoslovakia (1918–1938)] (in Slovak). Martin: Matica slovenská. ISBN 978-80-8115-053-1.
