= Madonna with Angel =

1929 painting by Ľudovít Fulla

Madonna with angel
- Madona s anjelom (Slovak)
- Artist: Ľudovít Fulla
- Year: 1929
- Medium: oil on canvas
- Dimensions: 80.5 cm × 70.5 cm (31.7 in × 27.8 in)
- Location: Slovak National Gallery; Bratislava

Madonna with angel (Slovak: Madona s anjelom) is a painting by Ľudovít Fulla from 1929.

== Description ==
The picture was created in 1929. It has the dimensions 80.5 x 70.5 centimeters. It is in the collection of the Slovak National Gallery.

== Analysis ==
Fulla incorporated Slovak folk art with avant-garde painting. Mother and child, Madonna was a theme in his work.
