= Miloš Krno =

Slovak writer (1922 – 2007)

Miloš Krno (25 July 1922 – 21 July 2007) was a Slovak writer.

== Biography ==
Krno was born in Bratislava and was raised in Partizánska Ľupča. From 1941 to 1946, he studied at Comenius University in Bratislava.

He published his first poetry collection, Šialené predstavenie, in 1944. He later began writing prose. His novels include Dve cesty (1953), Lavína (1954) and Míľový krok (1977) which form a trilogy, and another trilogy consisting of novels Cnostný Metod (1978), Udatný Radúz (1984) and Statočný Celo (1985). His 1958 novel Vrátim sa živý tells the story of Ján Nálepka. In 1984 he published the first part of his memoirs, Hory, rieky, ľudia, depicting his years from 1922 – 1953. He also wrote film and television screenplays and children's books, and also translated Russian, German, Georgian and Armenian poetry into Slovak. His last book, Ak je na zemi raj, in which he recalls his trips to Georgia and meetings of Georgian people, was published in 2002.

He was married to translator Viera Krnová (1925 – 2010).

He died in Bratislava at the age of 84.
