= Anton Šalát =

Slovak priest and politician (born 1892-1944)

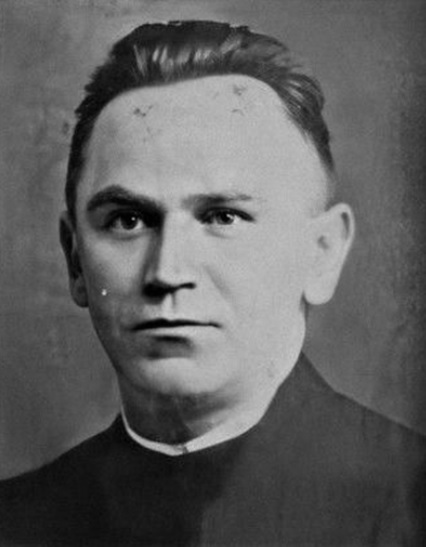
- Anton Šalát in 1930

Member of the National Assembly of the Czechoslovak Republic
- In office 1929–1939

Member of the Slovak National Council
- In office 1939–1944

Personal details
- Born: 12 June 1892 Necpaly, Austria-Hungary
- Died: 17 September 1944 (aged 52) Hájniky, Slovakia
- Party: Hlinka's Slovak People's Party

Anton Šalát (12 June 1892 – 17 September 1944) was a Slovak Catholic priest and politician. He served as a representative for Hlinka Slovak People’s Party in the Czechoslovak (1929–1939) and Slovak (from 1939 until his death) parliaments. He was shot by partisans in September 1944.

== Biography ==
Anton Šalát was born on 12 June 1892 in the village of Necpaly, which became a part of the city of Prievidza after World War II. He attended primary school in Prievidza and studied at the Piarist gymnasium there, followed by the gymnasium in Banská Bystrica , where he also began theological studies. Ordained a priest on 12 June 1916, he served as chaplain in Čierny Balog, Detva, and Hájniky. In 1918 he was transferred to Zvolen, gaining local prominence through Slovak language courses. Initially a supporter of the reformist Union of Catholic Clergy, he later joined the Hlinka Slovak People’s Party (HSĽS), serving from 1925 to 1944 as district chairman in Zvolen, a city councillor, and, in 1929 and 1935, as a member of the Czechoslovak parliament.

In 1932, he became the parish priest in Hájniky, where he oversaw extensive church, parish, and school renovations. His rectory became a meeting place for Slovak autonomists, including Andrej Hlinka and Jozef Tiso. He participated in the Žilina Assembly (October 1938) proclaiming Slovak autonomy, later serving as deputy in both the Slovak Land Assembly and the Slovak Parliament, where he advocated for social welfare and strongly opposed communism.

Active in numerous Catholic and civic associations, he also played a major role in regional journalism and publishing. He contributed fiction, political commentary, and hunting anecdotes to various periodicals, authored anti-communist pamphlets, a novel (Sklamaní hostia, 1944), and religious textbooks. He co-founded and edited the weekly Štúrov hlas (1939–1944) and managed the diocesan weekly Náš priateľ (1928–1944). In these publications, he promoted antisemitic tropes and hate speech and celebrated Adolf Hitler and Nazism.

== Death ==
On 17 September 1944, partisans from the group led by Pyotr Alexievich Velichko came to Hájniky. They captured ten prominent personalities from the village, tortured and robbed them and finally executed them on the bridge over the Hron river. The body of Šalát was discovered the next day nearby his church. He was 52 years old at the time of his death.

== Legacy ==
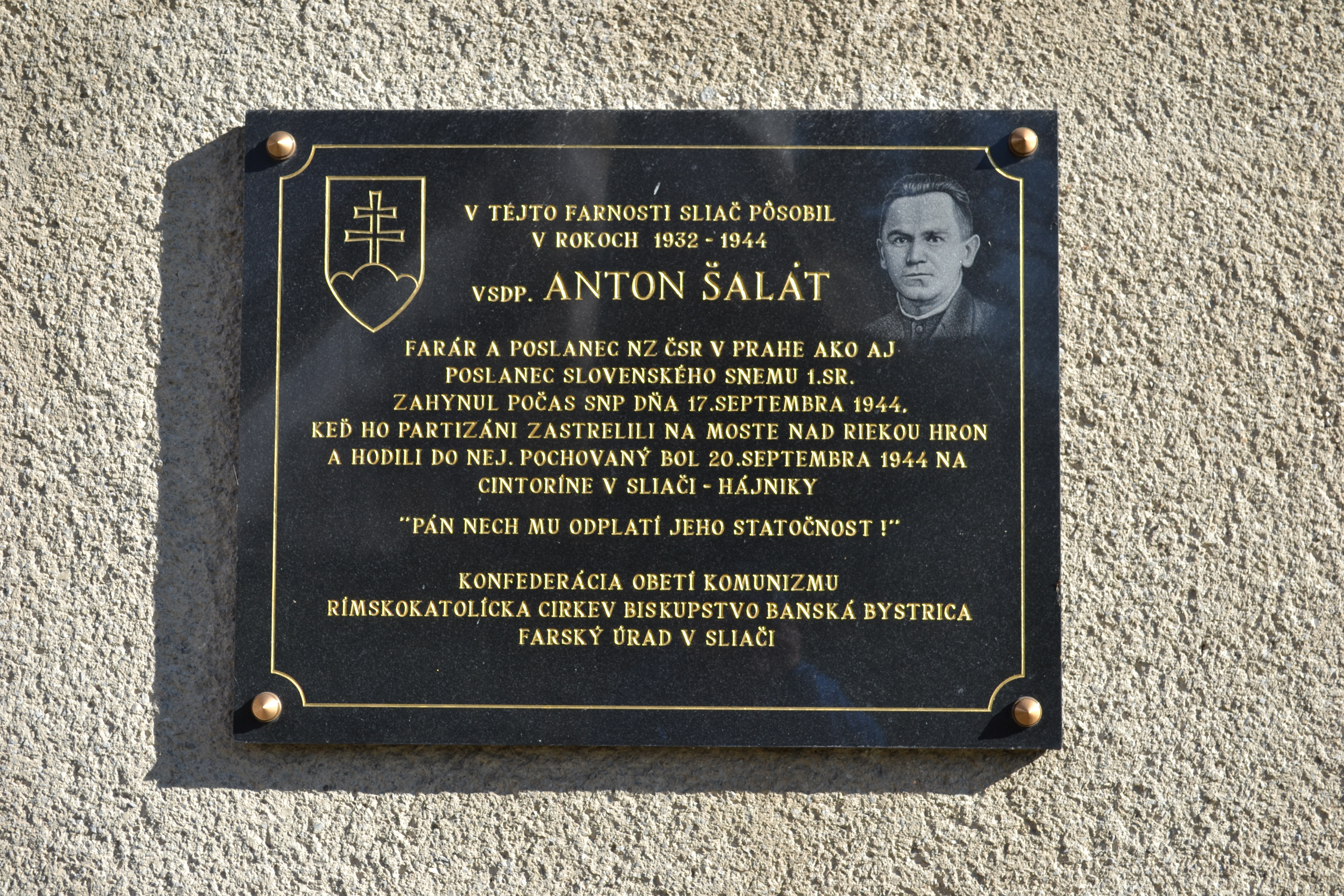
Memorial plaque dedicated to Anton Šalát in Sliač.

Among the victims of the partisan raid, Šalát was the only representative of the regime. Other victims included a Czech-born doctor and a Jewish escapee from a concentration camp. The mass execution caused uproar in the region. The mass execution was decried by general Rudolf Viest, the leader of the Slovak National Uprising and direct perpetrators were court-martialed and executed. Some representatives of the Catholic Church and nationalist circles later attempted to portray Šalát as a martyr of anti-communist struggle. A memorial plaque has been installed at a parish building in the town of Sliač, into which the former village of Hájniky had been merged after the war. At the same time, historians point out that Šalát was a convicted antisemite and supporter of Nazism.
