= Ľudovít Fulla =

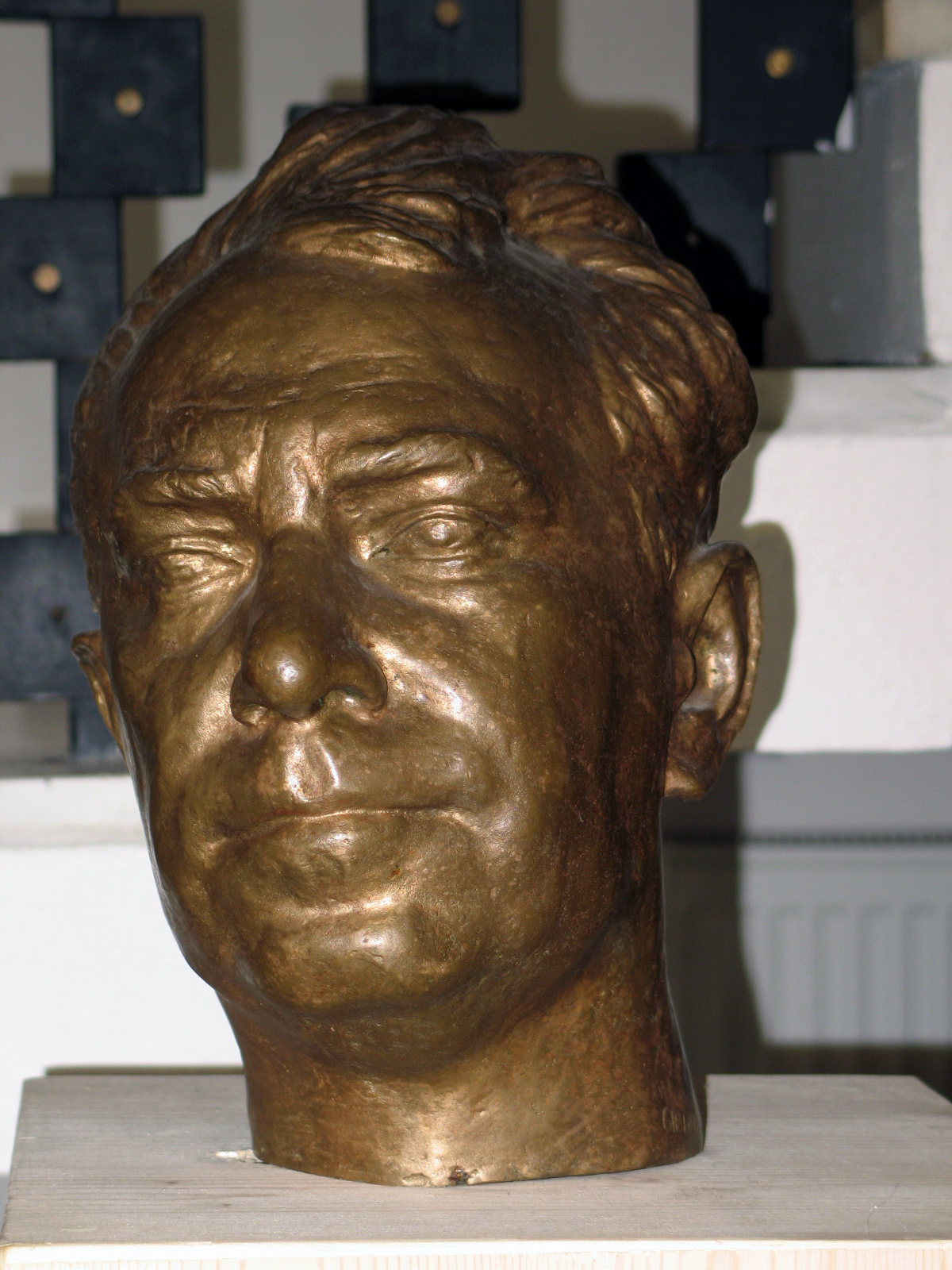
Fero Gibala, Bronze bust of Ľudovít Fulla, Ružomberok, Slovakia

Ľudovít Fulla (27 February 1902, Ružomberok – 21 April 1980, Bratislava) was a Slovak painter, graphic artist, illustrator, stage designer and art teacher. He is considered one of the most important figures of Slovak creative art in the 20th century.

== Style ==
Fulla's work was fundamentally important for the establishment of Slovak modernism. His personal style is characterized by a special "poetry of the image" relying on surface and decoration, a synthesis of rational and emotional elements, brilliant colour, knowledge of folk art, East Slavonic iconography and world Modernism. Ľudovít Fulla was predominantly inspired by the Prague modernist milieu. In his works, the principles of Wassily Kandinsky, Marc Chagall, Pablo Picasso and Paul Klee can be found. In the only manifesto of Slovak modernists, he and his friend Mikuláš Galanda formulated a firm stance in their attempt of a mixture of styles. Fulla was recognised for generations for his bright red, orange and yellow. This may have played off the folk iconography always present in his works, or may have been a further admixture of artistic period styles.

== Works ==
- Balóny (Balloons)
- Požehnanie statku (Blessing of the cattle)
- Vyhnanie z raja (Expulsion from the paradise)
- Ukrižovanie (Crucifixion)
- Slovenská madona (Slovak Madonna)
- Dedinská svatba (Village Wedding)
- Madonna with Angel
