= 2010 Bratislava shooting =

Mass shooting in Slovakia

Coordinates: 48.2167°N 16.9667°E

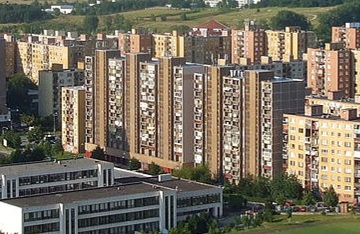
- A view of the shooting site (2008)
- Location: Pavla Horova Street, Devínska Nová Ves, Bratislava, Slovakia
- Date: 30 August 2010; 9:40 a.m.–10:16 a.m. (UTC+2)
- Attack type: Spree shooting, murder-suicide, mass shooting
- Weapons: vz. 58 semi-automatic rifle; CZ 85 Combat pistol; CZ 75 Compact pistol
- Deaths: 8 (including the perpetrator)
- Injuries: 17 (15 from gunfire)
- Perpetrator: Ľubomír Harman
- Motive: Probably neighborly disputes

The 2010 Bratislava shooting, or the Devínska Nová Ves shooting, occurred on 30 August 2010, when seven people were killed and 17 others injured by a lone gunman who opened fire in Devínska Nová Ves district in a suburb of the Slovak capital, Bratislava. The gunman then committed suicide. The shooting spree took place both inside a local panel building and later in the street outside.

It was the second-deadliest attack in the modern history of Slovakia. This was also the first time in Slovak history that a mass murderer went on a shooting spree. According to Police President Jaroslav Spišiak, Slovak police has to consult with other countries and find the best procedures for these cases, something that has not yet been done, as of February 2011. The shooting remains controversial not only because the killer's motive remains unknown, but also because of purposefully withholding information from the public by the authorities and what is generally perceived as a failed police action.

== Background ==
Devínska Nová Ves is a rather isolated district on the outskirts of Bratislava, with around 17,000 inhabitants (as of December 2021) and another 10,000 people commuting to work there (mainly because of the Volkswagen factory, usually bypassing the district proper). At the time of the attack, there were mostly elderly people at home in the apartment building. On the streets, it wasn't as busy as during the morning rush, but there were still quite a few people waiting for the bus, and parents with small children out for a walk. The attack started in a panel building that houses a kindergarten on the ground floor, but since it was the summer holiday, it was empty. There are over 20 policemen serving in the district.

There have been efforts to explain the attack by the tension created after the mass construction of apartment houses and a huge inflow of inhabitants during communism. While it is true that social cohesion is lower in similar environments (see for example Petržalka), no proof has ever been produced in this case.

== Attack ==
Devínska Nová Ves within Bratislava

=== Targeted killings ===
At 9:40 a.m., Ľubomír Harman started shooting on the third floor at Pavla Horova Street No. 1 inside apartment No.8 in Devínska Nová Ves, Bratislava, wearing a pair of blue earmuffs and equipped with a vz. 58 semi-automatic rifle, a CZ 85 Combat pistol, and a CZ 75 Compact pistol. He also had a leather bag hung over his shoulder, which contained many rounds of ammunition. Harman first entered a flat on the same floor as his, although it technically belonged to his neighbors.

After killing all five members of the family owning the flat, Harman then headed towards the exit from the building where he shot and wounded 49-year-old Jozef Pútik, a man from the same family. He then went outside of the building and encountered 79-year-old Vincent Fratrič, who was waiting by the entrance for window-changing workers. The two talked for a while, as Pútik buzzed into his family's flat, only to see that his relatives were already dead. Five to seven minutes later, Pútik ran outside of the apartment, collapsing and grabbing Fratrič's waist, begging for help. Harman suddenly leaned his rifle against Fratrič's shoulder and shot Pútik once in the head at point-blank range, killing him.

=== Random shootings ===
Harman then ignored Fratrič, instead reloading his rifle and opening fire on other pedestrians on the street. He also hit several cars driving nearby. The first emergency phone call was made at 9:45 a.m. Harman then began walking, firing into windows and in the direction of the kindergarten school and local shopping center. He seemed to be shooting randomly as he continued injuring several people from a considerable distance. Throughout the entire attack, Harman was described as being seen repeatedly touching the barrel of his rifle, checking if it is not overheated; this is verifiable from amateur footage made by eyewitnesses.

Coincidentally, many former policemen, soldiers, and border-guards lived in the Devínska Nová Ves District. During the shooting, Harman noticed a man in a window and shot in his direction, hitting his hand. The wounded man, a former professional sniper, subsequently aimed at the perpetrator, but later decided not to intervene and was only watching the police action with binoculars. During the attack, 52-year-old Gabriela Košťálová was shot on a balcony and died in a matter of minutes.

At one time, Harman was shooting from the vicinity of a newsstand, with several people being unaware of what was actually going on. According to eyewitness, 19-year-old Dominik Kapišinský, a woman inside the stand even came out at one point to throw out the garbage while the shooting was in progress and returned to sit inside again. According to an unnamed female eyewitness cited by magazine Plus 7 Dní, "one man stepped outside of his car and walked towards the shooter asking him why he was shooting".

=== Police response and shootout ===
At 9:47 a.m., the first police car arrived two minutes after receiving information about the shooting, with a second police car arriving after another two minutes. One of the responding policemen, 35-year-old captain Karol Vrchovský, approached Harman at a distance of 60 meters, then took cover behind a panel space at the base of a panel building, where he was hit by what is presumed to be a deflected bullet that entered though his upper lip and exited near his right ear; the gunshot wasn't fatal. The policemen then decided to encircle the shooter and wait for a tactical unit to arrive.

With the arrival of the police, Harman shifted his focus on mainly targeting police officers. Czech media routinely reported that at this time, some local inhabitants were handing out their own bulletproof vests to the engaging police officers. At 10:10 a.m., a highly awaited specialized unit (colloquially called "kukláči" in Slovak) arrived at the site from Malacky twenty-five minutes since the incident was reported. In six minutes, they successfully cornered Harman and critically wounded him with numerous gunshots, and Harman then committed suicide by a single gunshot wound to the head.

=== Aftermath ===
Fifteen people were taken to five different hospitals in Bratislava, and two people were being treated on the spot. Soon after the attack, the police sealed shut the whole district of Devínska Nová Ves, not letting anyone inside and checking every car leaving the district. According to eyewitnesses, after arriving at the exits, the police were just talking for a few minutes, letting people out of the district before starting the searches. Public transport was redirected around the district for an unspecified amount of time.

== Perpetrator ==
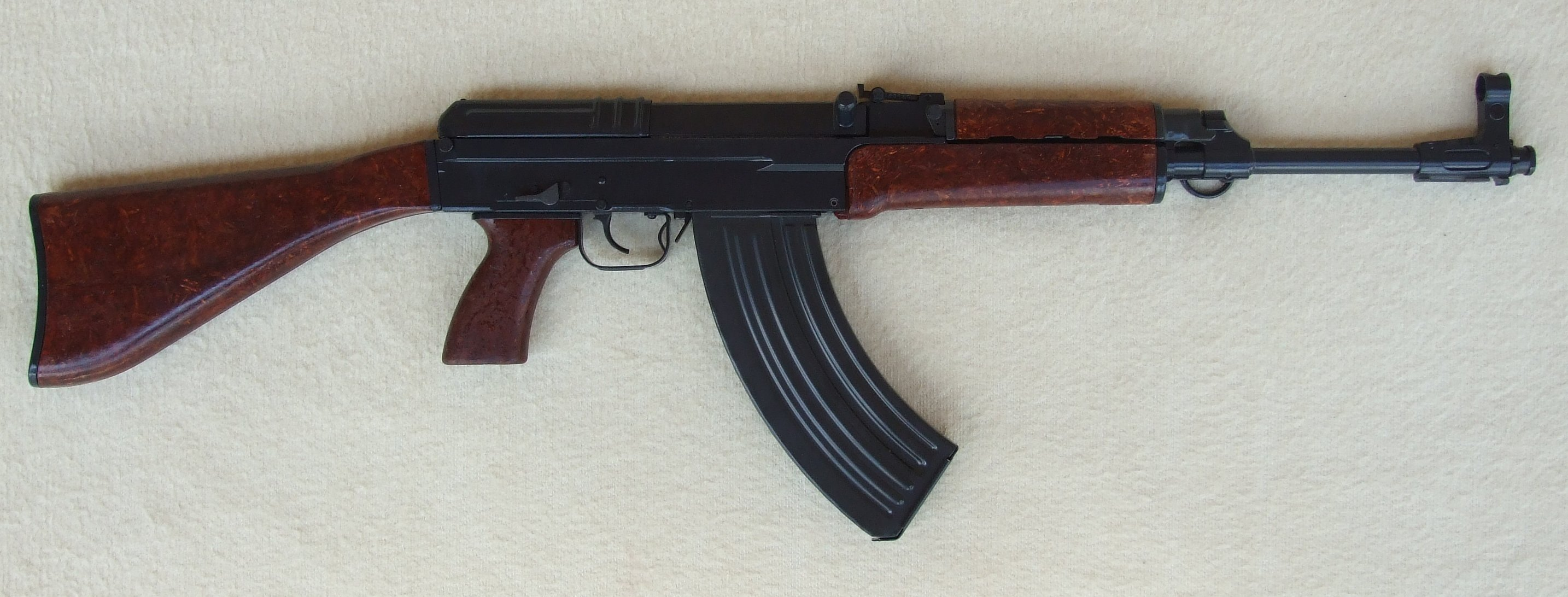
The vz. 58 assault rifle, semi-automatic version was used by Ľubomír Harman in the shootings.

The shooter was identified as 48-year-old Ľubomír Harman (Born 31 March 1962), who lived on the same floor of the same building as the targeted victims. For over 20 years he was living in this one-room flat, seldom or never visited by anyone. He legally owned six guns including the vz. 58. He owned the rifle legally for sporting purposes.

The Slovak police corps president said that Harman was not personally acquainted with any of his victims.

Together, 16 bullets were fired at Harman by the police, with the sixteenth bullet wounding him fatally. The final shot came from a special ops member, while three other policemen tried to shoot Harman unsuccessfully before. According to autopsy results, Ľubomír Harman was fatally hit into the left side of the chest and afterwards he shot himself.

Initial reports informed that the shooter was an intoxicated boy, approximately fifteen years old. Later that day, a single picture taken from one of the balconies above the street by a witness named Matej became available to the media. In this iconic picture, Harman is seen standing on the street, holding his rifle and looking up at the balconies.

=== Early life ===
Harman attended a forestry high school in Liptovský Hrádok. According to his former schoolmate Pavol Časnocha who took karate lessons with him at the time, Harman was "a little quiet, I don't want to say withdrawn, maybe a loner". Another former classmate, Peter Žihľavník, remembered him as being an average student without any notable abilities. According to him "(Harman) was not withdrawn and didn't have any kind of phobia, he was a normal boy". They also sometimes played football together.

Harman went through the compulsory military service in the early 1980s, but he was never a professional soldier and he had no criminal record.

=== Adult life ===
Ľubomír Harman spent a lot of his time in nature. After finishing high school and military service, he was employed in Wood Industry Bratislava as an "energetician in the technical division". He stayed there for four years. According to an unnamed long-time friend, people liked him there at the time as he would sometimes go beer drinking with his colleagues.

Harman used to be a hunter, which according to some is how his relationship with firearms began. On 10 January 1998 Harman became the member of "Club of Reserve Soldiers 008 Fox" in Bratislava, where he often practiced shooting and participated in shooting competitions. He was often seen practicing at a shooting range in Stupava near Bratislava.

During the 1990s Harman worked for four different companies in which he was remembered as always fulfilling his duties the way it was expected. In a company, where he was employed as a boilerman, a female colleague remembers that people used to call him "silent face". "He worked and worked and worked, he listened, but did not talk", she recalls. He is remembered as always frowning but never slacking, helping everyone anytime, described even as an "ideal employee". He worked mainly in maintenance in different heater rooms around Bratislava. He quit his last job suddenly two years ago, being unemployed since 1 August 2008, despite being persuaded by his employer to stay. Since 2008 he was unemployed, he was receiving €118 welfare a month. This would later affect his presence at competitions and in practice because of lack of money. In 2010 before the murders he entered only one shooting competition.

=== Relationships ===
Harman never got married and lived a solitary life. According to an unnamed long-time friend, Harman was lately more withdrawn than ever in his life before. He was keen on his parents, brother and sister and he had a good relationships with them. All of them were still alive at the time of the murders.

According to his friend from the shooting club, Daniel Líška, Harman neither showed any aggressive nor hostile behaviour. He has never mentioned any conflicts with his neighbours. He did not communicate with any of his neighbours and they could not recall having any conflicts with him either. According to his neighbours he was hard to notice and he never greeted anyone.

According to Harman's ex-colleague who appeared anonymously on camera in TV Markíza on 2 September 2010, Harman was a "good soul" and he got exploited easily.

== Victims ==
Targeted killings
1. Jozefa Slezáková (born 1934), killed at the apartment, retired, owner of the one-room flat.
2. Mária Slezáková (born 1966), killed at the apartment, daughter of Jozefa Slezáková.
3. Ružena Halászová (born 1959), killed at the apartment but did not live there, daughter of Jozefa Slezáková, described by neighbors as problematic. She returned from The United Kingdom several months before the attack and started visiting her mother.
4. Jozef Slezák (born 1998), killed at the apartment, son of Mária Slezáková, because of his very long hair at first misidentified as a girl.
5. Stanislav Slezák (born 1983), killed at the apartment, grandson of Jozefa Slezáková, his mother was not involved in the massacre.
6. Jozef Pútik a.k.a. Vinco (born 1961), killed right in front of the building, partner of Mária Slezáková and father of Jozef Slezák. He was of Roma ethnicity. According to an interview with his brother a few hours after the massacre, he often visited the apartment to look after his son Jozef.
Random killings
7. Gabriela Košťálová (born 1958), shot when looking down from her balcony, died inside her apartment at Jána Smreka street, found in the late afternoon by her partner.
Perpetrator
8. Ľubomír Harman (born 1962), suicide at an unspecified location.

The police found five bodies inside the flat, all of them members of the Putík family. Although initial reports claimed that the family was of Roma ethnicity, it was later confirmed to be false; some of the partners of the female victims were Roma (with one of them being among those slain), while the family itself was Slavic. The last victim, Ms. Košťálová, was later found by her relatives on the balcony of a different apartment; she was revealed to not be related to the other victims and was shot when she looked down from her balcony.

Five years prior to the shooting, Slovak television station Markíza made a report about the family of the victims. The report was instigated by the neighbors of the family. According to the report, all other inhabitants of the block of flats signed a letter inviting the reporters. At the time the report was made, only two of the victims were living in the flat, while the others moved in later. In the report, the reporter starts by saying that "in a block of flats, where tens of families live near each other, one bad neighbour may be a real catastrophe". He continues by claiming that the inhabitants had even faced death threats from said family, and therefore nobody was willing to talk directly to the camera. Later, it was revealed that the family had not paid rent and therefore is facing eviction; however, due to the laws in Slovakia, which favour tenants, the process may take very long. The family denied all allegations. Also according to the report, the police were called a number of times to solve the situation, but no progress was made.

Of the fifteen people taken to the hospitals, eight required longer hospitalization, with three people in a serious condition. According to the spokeswoman for Bratislava's University Hospital, Rút Geržová, "two, including a 33-year-old Czech man, [are] in a very serious condition." The aforementioned 33-year-old Czech had to be put into a coma; also in critical condition was 19-year-old Andrej, who was shot into the chest and collar bone. He had to be resuscitated twice and the doctors had to take part of his lung. 35-year-old police officer Karol Vrchovský suffered a minor face injury. 70-year-old Nadežda was shot into her leg on the street when returning home from buying groceries; she had been waiting for paramedics in the local pharmacy. A woman named Veronika was shot into her right shoulder and forearm. A three-year-old child suffered a minor ear injury when hit inside a car passing by the crime scene (after the attack the child's father was unsure if it was a hit or just a cut from broken glass). 79-year-old Vincent Fratrič had to be hospitalized because of temporarily going deaf from having a rifle fired by his ear. Among the injured is also the son of a known Slovak scientist, Igor Kapišinský; 19-year-old Dominik Kapišinský was hit by four bullets in the stomach while standing on his balcony on 11th floor of a nearby building.

== Controversy ==
=== Information withholding ===
No information about the attack was made public by the authorities until a press briefing by Interior Minister Daniel Lipšic at 14:39 p.m., despite numerous demands by journalists. This, coupled with the fact that the shooting occurred in a densely populated area with dozens of eyewitnesses with mobile phones, digital cameras and internet connections, created a situation where news media based their reports on accounts from Facebook and word-of-mouth. Many of this information later turned out to be false, yet nevertheless added to the panic.

When, in the hours immediately following Harman's death, minister Lipšic addressed the public (the first official to do so), he addressed the need to arm the Slovak police with better weapons before even informing the public of what had actually transpired and addressing the question of whether it was safe for the public to venture out of their homes. In fact, before telling the public what happened, he attacked his predecessor, the previous Interior Minister, talked about the unsuitability of current crime statistics without knowing that the attack was random and managed to praise the police action without any analysis of the police response. Besides a brief message instructing people to stay inside their flats played over a few small loudspeakers on the streets (which are common in Slovakia), citizens were given no information about the shooting until over four hours after the attack ended.

Actually, after the shooting, no one ever gave the public the information that it is safe again to resume their lives. While Slovak police chief Jaroslav Spišiak and minister Lipšic maintain that the response was well executed and that two minutes after receiving first call the police were already engaging Harman, most of the witnesses agree that the police actions were slow, chaotic and poorly organised.

According to an article published on 2 September 2010, in major Slovak weekly Plus 7 Dní, there was chaos and uncertainty among the citizens at the crime scene. According to journalists Lenka Ďurajková and Lukáš Milan, even in the afternoon, the policemen were outwardly lying to people asking about the safety situation. "Didn't you hear the message over the public radio?!" one policeman is quoted as answering to a question if it safe to go outside. Another policemen is quoted as saying "Do you want to risk it?" when asked by a woman if it is safe to go out with her dog, even when the attacker was several hours dead and the attack long ended.

=== Discrepancies in the official version of events ===
Contrary to official version of the events, according to witness Vincent Fratrič, it took approximately ten minutes after Jozef Pútik's death for the first police car to show up.

According to an interview with victim Dominik Kapišinský, the police action against Harman was poorly executed and the police did not have the situation under control. At the time he was shot there were already two policemen at the scene, but instead of shooting at the attacker and distracting him, they merely shouted at him.

== Investigation ==
Investigation of the shootings concluded on 13 July 2011. Six months after the incident, Slovak police were still not able to determine the number of bullets fired by Ľubomír Harman and the number of those fired by the police. Because of widespread speculation that some of the victims of the massacre could have been shot by police officers during the chaos of the poorly organised encounter, partial results of the investigation by the expert forensic office of the Slovak police force (Slovak: Kriminalistický a expertízny ústav Policajného zboru Slovenskej republiky) were made public in February 2011, claiming that the only person ever to be hit by the police was the shooter.

The final results of the investigation were initially released to the TV station Markíza. Its reporters claimed that Ľubomír Harman fired 140 bullets (24 inside the apartment and 116 in the street). The police fired altogether fifteen bullets, one of them hitting the attacker. They also claim that the investigator heard dozens of testimonies and the prosecution was stopped because the accused is dead.

== Aftermath ==
=== Immediate reaction ===
Interior Minister Daniel Lipšic and the national police chief Jaroslav Spišiak arrived at the site. President Ivan Gašparovič, Mayor of Bratislava Andrej Ďurkovský, and Prime Minister Iveta Radičová all expressed their condolences. The Slovak government, at a special session on 31 August, declared a national day of mourning on 2 September 2010, to commemorate the victims of the shooting rampage.

Relatives of the perpetrator faced death threats from relatives of the victims after the act. After consulting police, the perpetrator's mother, father, brother, and sister, together with their families, presumably fled to Hungary to seek refuge with relatives living there. Slovak police officials were unwilling to comment on the issue. According to police spokeswoman Petra Hrášková, "information that Harman's family is hiding abroad at the advice of the police cannot be confirmed or denied".

On 2 September 2010, the authorities had the apartment disinfected and all of the belongings inside hauled to be burned. This caused strong disagreement on the part of the relatives of some of the victims, who claimed that the apartment contained some valuables. According to footage made by TV Markíza, more police had to be summoned to the crime scene to handle the situation. Authorities claimed that one of the attacker's bullets punctured a water pipe in the apartment. This caused flooding and destroyed much of the stuff inside. They went on to claim that the situation had to be dealt with because the crime scene posed a public health hazard.

=== Long-term response ===
The following day, Interior Minister Daniel Lipšic announced that the Slovak police are ready to implement changes which should prevent similar attacks in the future, mainly the arming of police officers with Škorpion vz. 61 submachine guns. The plan was immediately criticized by police and military experts and journalists alike, due to the fact that this gun has only limited effectiveness at larger distances and wouldn't have changed anything in the case of this massacre. Later, without much publicity, the Slovak police was issued vz. 58 assault rifles, the fully automatic version of the shooter's sporting rifle. Following instances of losing their new rifles by policemen, the measure came under criticism in February 2011, when a policeman in Bratislava forgot his assault rifle on the roof of his vehicle and drove off (it later slipped off at a public transport stop) and a policewoman in Žilina forgot her vz. 58 at a gas station after a Sunday coffee. Moreover, the parliamentary opposition attacked the arming of police, saying that arming even the traffic police with submachine guns invokes "feeling of civil war" and "scares the tourists".

The ownership of automatic weapons by civilians is prohibited under any circumstances, including competitive shooting. The ownership of firearms should be possible only with adequate psychological examinations and that these will have to be retaken every five years. This was actually proposed also in the past but it was never passed into law because of the powerful hunting lobby in Slovakia.

On 12 October 2010, a memorial medal was awarded to Peter Novosedlík by the Ministry of Interior. Novosedlík, an ex-police officer, risked his own life when he helped get the wounded policeman into an ambulance. He happened to be working about 100 meters away from the location of the massacre.

== In popular culture ==
On 17 February 2011, the movie "Devínsky masaker" (Devínska Nová Ves massacre), which was about the 2010 Bratislava shootings, premiered in Slovakia. The 60-minute movie is a combination of documentary and drama, merging documentary-style opinions of witnesses and surviving family members with quick-paced action. Notably, the family of the shooter refused any cooperation with the filmmakers. "Devínsky masaker" received generally negative reviews; for example, a week after the premiere, the Czech and Slovak Film Database reported an aggregate score of 28%. Major Slovak weekly Plus 7 Dní concluded its review by writing, "Trailers for this movie, where producers let Harman's friend strongly attack the dead victims and about the murdered half-Roma boy Jožko, they manage only to inform us that at the age of 12 he did not yet smoke, do not necessarily attract people into cinemas. But they are guaranteed to stir the passions." The movie's title is technically incorrect, since the massacre took place in the district of Devínska Nová Ves not the district of Devín. Correctly, it would be "Devínskonovoveský masaker".

== See also ==
- Crime in Slovakia
- Law enforcement in Slovakia

== Sources ==
- Interview with Dominik Kapišinský (19), published 10 September 2010 in Slovak daily Hospodárske noviny. Interview conducted by Andrea Szöcsová.
- Review of the movie "Devínsky masaker", published 24 February 2011 in Slovak weekly Plus 7 Dní, author Lenka Ďurajková.
