= Ružomberok =

- Municipality
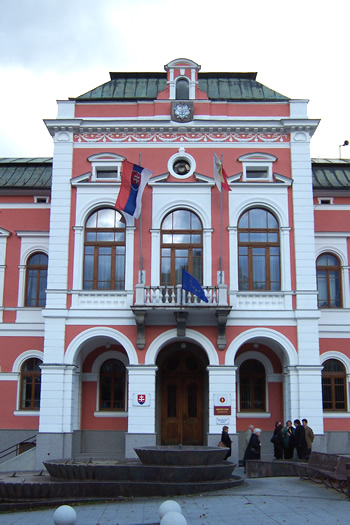
- Town hall

- Flag Coat of arms

- Location of Ružomberok in the Žilina Region Location of Ružomberok in Slovakia
- Coordinates: 49.08°N 19.31°E
- Country: Slovakia
- Region: Žilina Region
- District: Ružomberok District
- First mentioned: 1233

Government
  - Mayor: Ľubomír Kubáň

Area
  - Total: 127.36 km^{2} (49.17 sq mi)
- Elevation: 535 m (1,755 ft)

Population (2025)
  - Total: 26,099
- Time zone: UTC+1 (CET)
  - Summer (DST): UTC+2 (CEST)
- Postal code: 340 1
- Area code: +421 44
- Vehicle registration plate (until 2022): RK
- Website: ruzomberok.sk

Ružomberok (Slovak pronunciation: [ˈruʐɔmberɔk]; German: Rosenberg; Hungarian: Rózsahegy; Polish: Rużomberk) is a town in northern Slovakia, in the historical Liptov region. It has a population of approximately 27,000.

== Etymology ==
The name of the initial settlement located on today's Makovický street was Revúca (Slovak "roaring", derived from the Revúca river). In its neighborhood, German colonists build a new settlement Rosenberg (literally "Rose hill") named after wild roses growing in the area. This name was later adopted by Slovaks as Ružomberok and translated by Hungarians as Rózsahegy.

== Geography ==
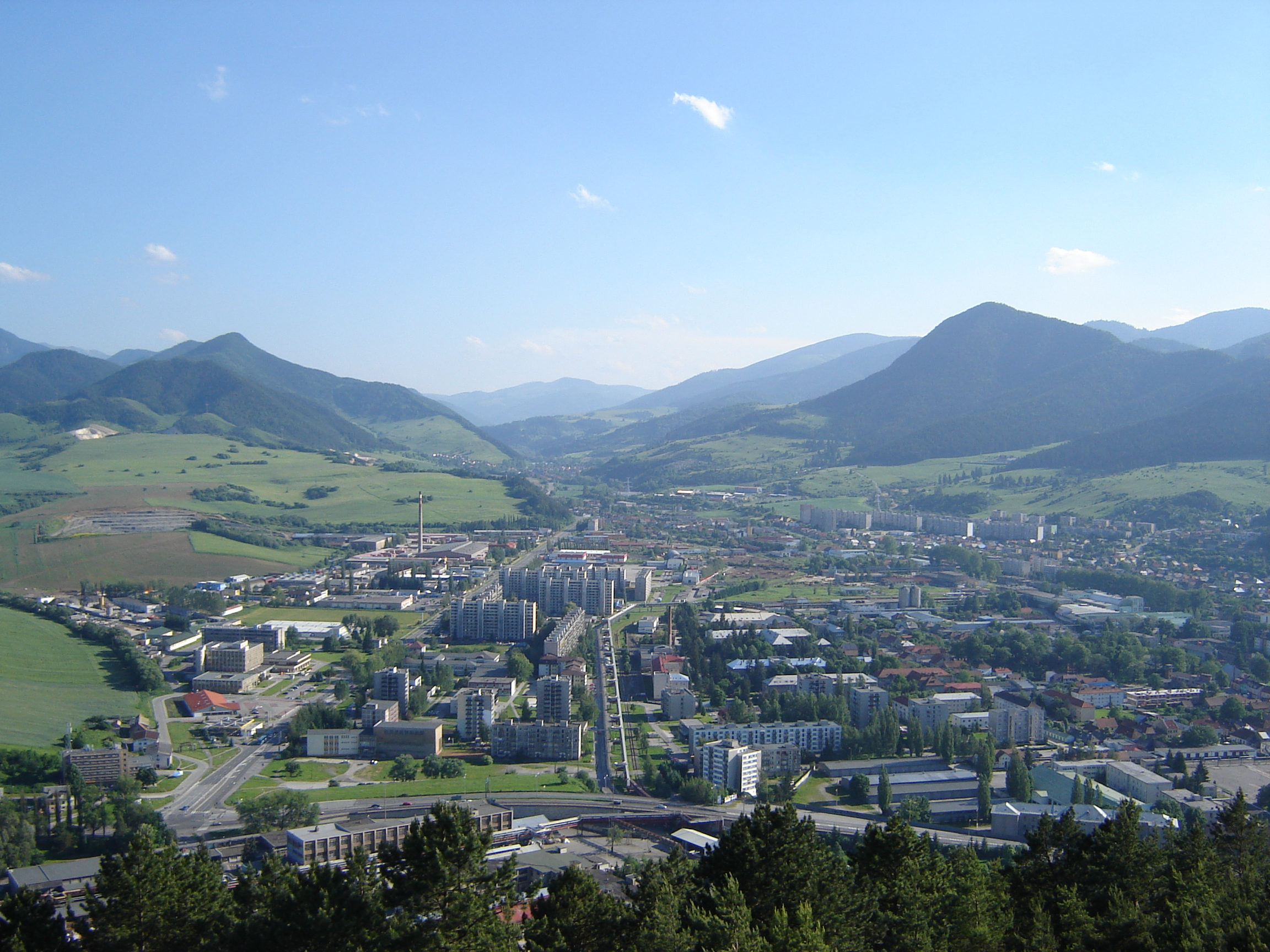
Panorama of Ružomberok

The municipality lies at an altitude of 535 metres (1,755 ft) and covers an area of 127.36 km^{2} (49.17 sq mi) (2025).

It is situated at the westernmost reaches of the Sub-Tatra Basin, more exactly its subdivision Liptov Basin, surrounded by the mountain ranges of Chočské vrchy, Greater Fatra and Low Tatras. Rivers flowing through the town are Váh, from east to west, Revúca, a left tributary from the south, on the way to Banská Bystrica, and Likavka brook from the north, on the way to Dolný Kubín. The town is located around 65 km from Žilina, 190 km from Košice and 260 km from Bratislava (by road). Besides the main settlement, it also has "city parts" of Biely Potok, Černová, Hrboltová, and Vlkolínec.

=== Climate ===
The climate is moderate, varying from hot in summer to very cold in winter. There are four distinct seasons: spring (wet, moderately warm), summer (hot, very wet), autumn (dry), and winter (very cold). Ružomberok is located in the rain shadow of the mountain ranges of Greater Fatra and Chočské vrchy. Total annual precipitation is 967 mm. The annual average of days with snow cover is 68. The highest snow cover ever recorded was 92 cm. Extreme temperatures: high: 37 °C (99 °F) (2007), low: −38 °C (−36 °F) (1949, 1986).

Ružomberok has a humid continental climate (Köppen: Dfb).

Climate data for Ružomberok
Month	Jan	Feb	Mar	Apr	May	Jun	Jul	Aug	Sep	Oct	Nov	Dec	Year
Mean daily maximum °C (°F)	−1.1 (30.0)	1.4 (34.5)	6.0 (42.8)	12.1 (53.8)	16.5 (61.7)	20.1 (68.2)	21.8 (71.2)	21.9 (71.4)	16.8 (62.2)	11.6 (52.9)	5.6 (42.1)	0.3 (32.5)	11.1 (51.9)
Daily mean °C (°F)	−3.8 (25.2)	−2.0 (28.4)	1.8 (35.2)	7.1 (44.8)	11.6 (52.9)	15.4 (59.7)	16.9 (62.4)	16.7 (62.1)	12.0 (53.6)	7.1 (44.8)	2.5 (36.5)	−2.2 (28.0)	6.9 (44.5)
Mean daily minimum °C (°F)	−6.8 (19.8)	−5.4 (22.3)	−2.4 (27.7)	1.9 (35.4)	6.3 (43.3)	10.0 (50.0)	11.6 (52.9)	11.5 (52.7)	7.4 (45.3)	3.4 (38.1)	−0.2 (31.6)	−4.6 (23.7)	2.7 (36.9)
Average precipitation mm (inches)	66.9 (2.63)	64.7 (2.55)	61.0 (2.40)	63.7 (2.51)	104.2 (4.10)	106.7 (4.20)	119.4 (4.70)	104.1 (4.10)	84.5 (3.33)	67.1 (2.64)	61.7 (2.43)	63.5 (2.50)	967.5 (38.09)
Source: Weather.Directory

== History ==
In 1233, King Andrew II of Hungary granted the land Revúca (terra Reuche) to his servant Hudko (Hudkonth, in the deed of confirmation Hudko). Hudko, his son Miloslav (Mylozou), and his offspring cultivated the land where the Slovak village Revúca had been founded in the 13th century. Before the 1320s, Germans founded a new settlement, Rosenberg (possesio Rozumberg), right on the hill near the older village. In 1329, Revúca became a part of Ružomberok and received a new name, Podhora (Sub Monte).

In 1340, Charles I of Hungary confirmed the town rights: burgesses and "guests" (German colonists) had the same rights as in Ľupča (now Partizánska Ľupča). The extent of previous rights is not completely clear. Ružomberok allegedly had similar rights since 1318, but the charter preserved only in a copy could be fake. The Germans had had a dominant position probably until 1431 when many rich families left the town under the pressure of the Hussites. The town council was then controlled by Slovaks, and during the 15th century, the town was Slovakised.

In the 19th century, the town was one of the centres of the Slovak national movement. It slowly became one of the industrial and financial centres of the Kingdom of Hungary, particularly after the Kassa Oderberg Railway was completed in 1871, when many new factories emerged: paper and pulpwood works, but also brick works (1871) and the textile industry.

In 1907, in Černová, which was rather a street than a part of the town, an event known as the Černová tragedy.

After the break-up of Austria-Hungary in 1918, Ružomberok became a part of Czechoslovakia. However, when Czechoslovakia was broken up in 1939, it was incorporated into the First Slovak Republic and was the capital of one of the counties, Tatra County (Tatranská župa). On 5 April 1945, Ružomberok was captured by troops of the I Czechoslovak Army Corps, acting as a part of the Soviet 4th Ukrainian Front. Ružomberok became again part of Czechoslovakia, and after the dissolution of Czechoslovakia in 1993, it became part of Slovakia. In 1995, Ruzomberok became a district town.

== Population ==
Historical population
Year	Pop.	±%
1970	22,090	—
1980	26,396	+19.5%
1991	29,416	+11.4%
2001	30,417	+3.4%
2011	28,400	−6.6%
2021	27,407	−3.5%
Source: Censuses

Population statistic (10 years)
Year	1995	2005	2015	2025
Count	30,664	29,979	27,284	26,099
Difference		−2.23%	−8.98%	−4.34%

Population statistic
Year	2024	2025
Count	26,384	26,099
Difference		−1.08%

It has a population of 26,099 people (31 December 2025).

=== Ethnicity ===
Census 2021 (1+ %)
Ethnicity	Number	Fraction
Slovak	25,344	92.47%
Not found out	1772	6.46%
Total	27,407	

In year 2021 was 27,407 people by ethnicity 25,344 as Slovak, 1772 as Not found out, 230 as Romani, 216 as Czech, 91 as Other, 68 as Hungarian, 55 as Russian, 48 as Ukrainian, 32 as Rusyn, 28 as Polish, 25 as Vietnamese, 20 as German, 13 as Serbian, 12 as Irish, 11 as Chinese, 9 as Italian, 9 as Moravian, 8 as English, 6 as French, 4 as Jewish, 4 as Silesian, 4 as Austrian, 3 as Romanian, 3 as Croatian, 3 as Bulgarian, 2 as Turkish, 1 as Canadian, 1 as Iranian and 1 as Albanian.

Note on population: The difference values of population numbers in the table "Population statistic" and in the sections "Ethnicity" & "Religion" is caused by the use of various statistical methods.

=== Religion ===
Census 2021 (1+ %)
Religion	Number	Fraction
Roman Catholic Church	17,093	62.37%
None	6327	23.09%
Not found out	1976	7.21%
Evangelical Church	1159	4.23%
Total	27,407	

In year 2021 was 27,407 people by religion 17,093 from Roman Catholic Church, 6327 from None, 1976 from Not found out, 1159 from Evangelical Church, 218 from Greek Catholic Church, 127 from Ad hoc movements, 79 from Other, 67 from Eastern Orthodox Church, 67 from Christian Congregations in Slovakia, 54 from Baptists Church, 42 from Jehovah's Witnesses, 41 from Other and not ascertained christian church, 27 from Buddhism, 25 from Islam, 17 from Paganism and natural spirituality, 17 from United Methodist Church, 16 from Old Catholic Church, 16 from Seventh-day Adventist Church, 15 from Calvinist Church, 8 from Jewish community, 5 from Apostolic Church, 4 from Hinduism, 3 from Czechoslovak Hussite Church, 2 from Church of the Brethren, 1 from New Apostolic Church and 1 from Church of Jesus Christ of Latter-day Saints.

== Industry and commerce ==
Ružomberok was famous in the 20th century as an industrial town. The resulting pollution has remained one of the biggest challenges the town faces. It had the largest cotton mill in Slovakia: BZVIL or Texicom; and still has one of the largest exporter businesses in Slovakia: Mondi SCP, formerly known as SCP – Severoslovenské celulózky a papierne. Texicom went bankrupt in 2006. Mondi SCP is a paper and pulp factory and is the biggest employer in the Ružomberok district and the Liptov region. The town also has a brick factory located in the south.

Ružomberok is nowadays also considered a good shopping town, with almost all supermarket brands.

== Schools ==
Apart from its numerous primary and secondary schools, the town also has 2 grammar schools and 2 universities. The Catholic University is based in Ružomberok, and the University of Žilina has a branch in the town. Since September 2007, it has not been possible to study at the detached workplace of the University of Žilina.

== Landmarks and culture ==
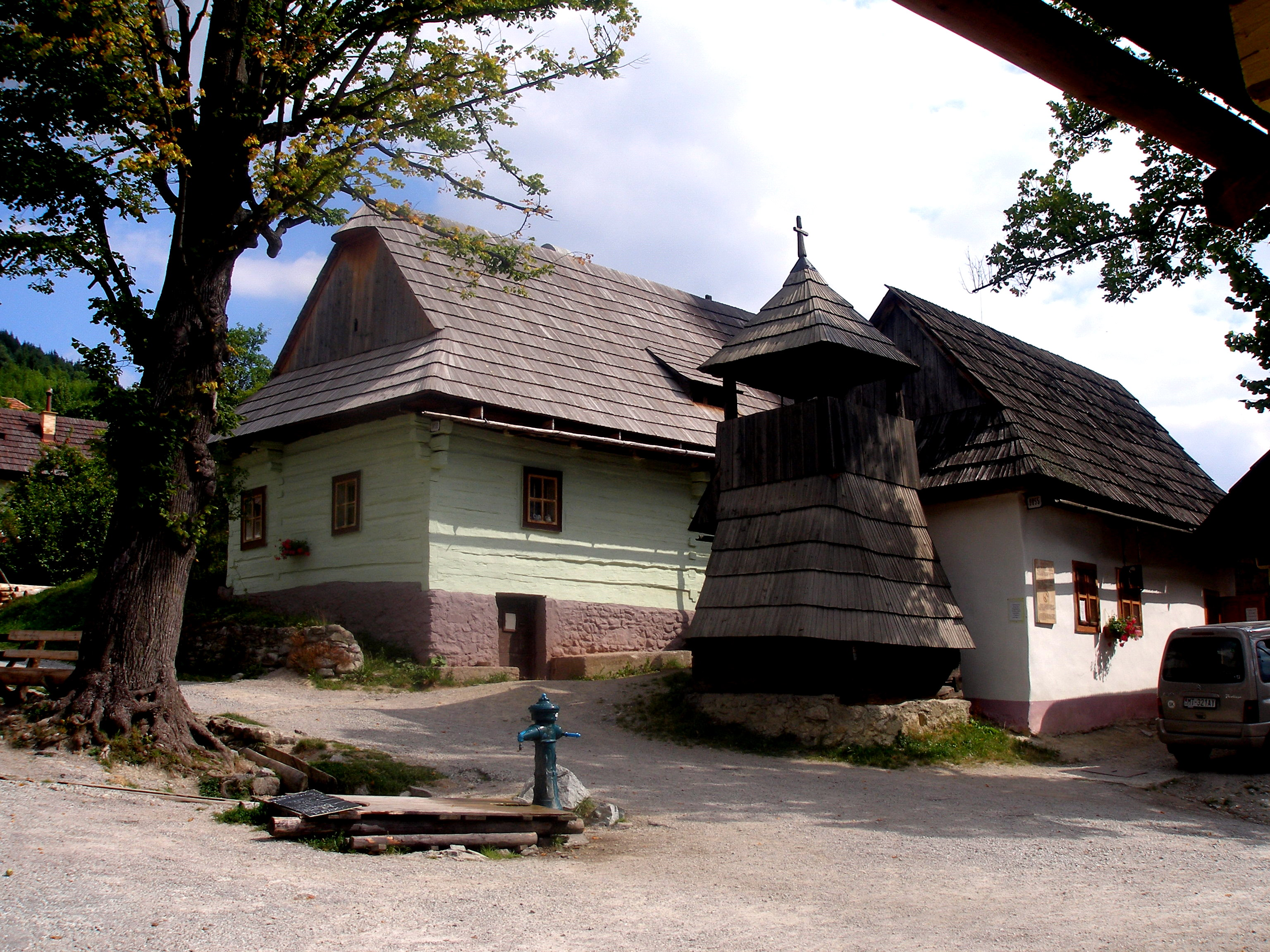
Vlkolínec village

The centre of the town is located at the Andrej Hlinka Square (Námestie Andreja Hlinku). Among the sights in or around the square are the Roman Catholic Church of St. Andrew, first mentioned in 1318, originally built in a Gothic but now presenting a Renaissance–Baroque style; the town hall, built in 1895 in the neo-Baroque style; and the church and monastery of the Holy Cross (built 1806 and 1730 respectively).

Cultural institutions in the towns include the Liptov Museum, established in 1912, which also has exhibitions outside the town. These include the Likava Castle, which is just outside the town in the Likavka village, and the Museum of the Liptov Village in Pribylina.

The Ľudovít Fulla Gallery is a branch of the Slovak National Gallery and is dedicated to Fulla's works of art. The gallery also hosts the concert series Hudba u Fullu ("Music at Fulla"). In recent years, the programme of the series has included works by composers such as Vladimír Godár, Peter Machajdík, Arvo Pärt, Philip Glass, Valentin Silvestrov, Gavin Bryars, and many others. In November 2017, the Ľudovít Fulla Gallery hosted the international sound art and multimedia festival Sound Art vs. Multimedia.

The town also has the only scout museum in Slovakia.

Other sights within the town include the Evangelic church from 1923 to 1926, a historic building of the railway station from 1871, now protected as a national historic monument; Calvary above the town in the Classicist style, built in 1858; a synagogue from 1880; and the church in Černová, where the tragedy in 1907 happened.

Attractions in the surroundings include the Čebrať mountain (1,054 m), Vlkolínec village, inscribed in 1993 on the UNESCO World Heritage Site list, and the skiing area of Malinô Brdo (also called Malinné).

== Sport ==
The women's basketball team MBK Ružomberok is the most successful in Slovakia's sports history, with two EuroLeague Women victories. The men's football team MFK Ružomberok plays in the Slovak First Football League. In 2006, it was champion of both the first league (at the time: Corgoň liga) and the Slovak FA Cup.

== Notable people ==
- Ľudovít Fulla, painter, graphic artist, illustrator, stage designer and art teacher
- Dušan Galis, football coach and former football player
- Andrej Hlinka, politician, priest, and activist
- Peter Lorre (László Löwenstein), Hollywood actor
- Elo Romančík, actor
- Dárius Rusnák, ice hockey player
- Karol Sidor, politician and journalist
- Jozef Vengloš, former footballer, manager, and FIFA football expert

== Twin towns – sister cities ==
Ružomberok is twinned with:

- Bački Petrovac, Serbia
- Gospić, Croatia
- Děčín, Czech Republic
- Hlučín, Czech Republic
- Kroměříž, Czech Republic
- Prague 6, Czech Republic

== Heraldry ==
Ružomberok	V striebornom štíte červená zlatostredá a zelenokališná trojitá sklonená ruža, zhora prestrelená zlatým šípom.

== See also ==
- Černová tragedy
- Vlkolínec
- Catholic University in Ružomberok
- MFK Ružomberok
- MBK Ružomberok

== Gallery ==
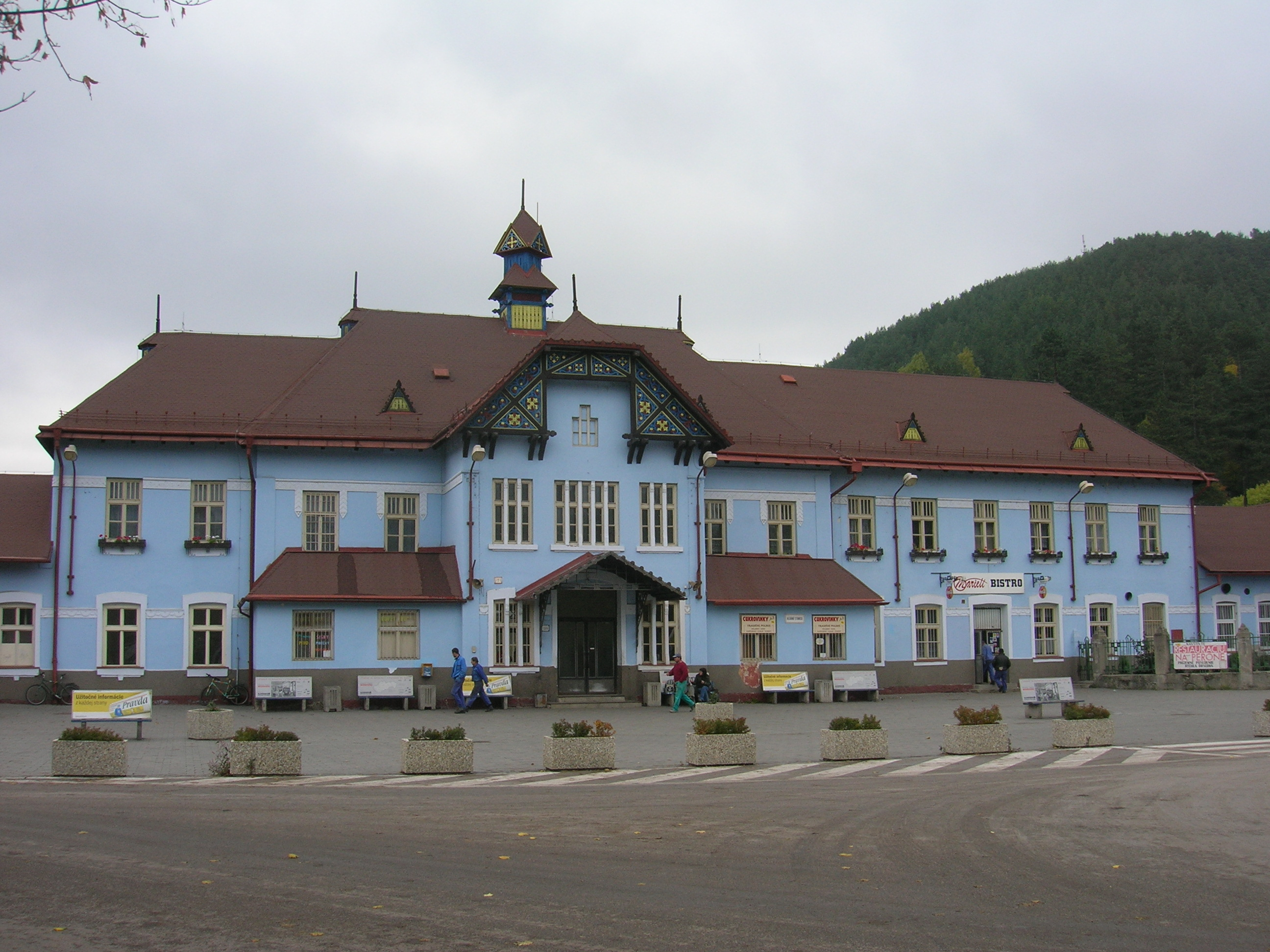
Railway station

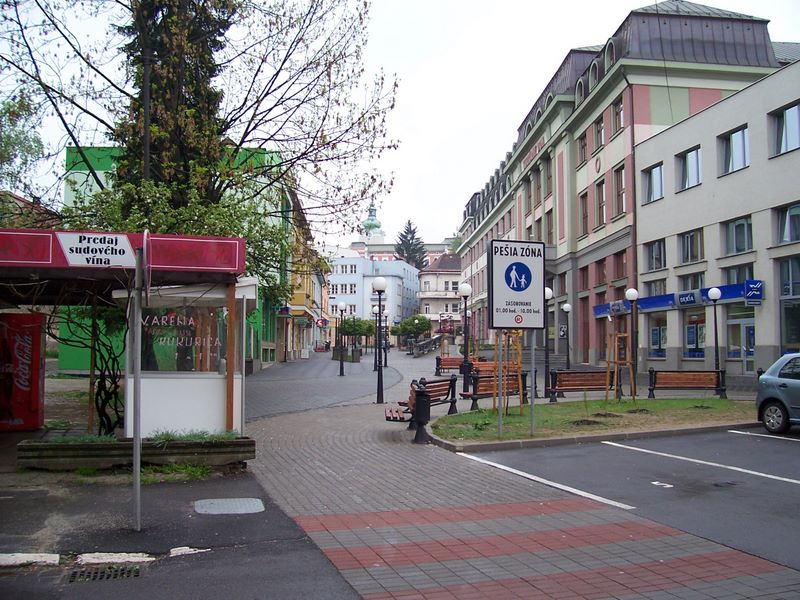
City center

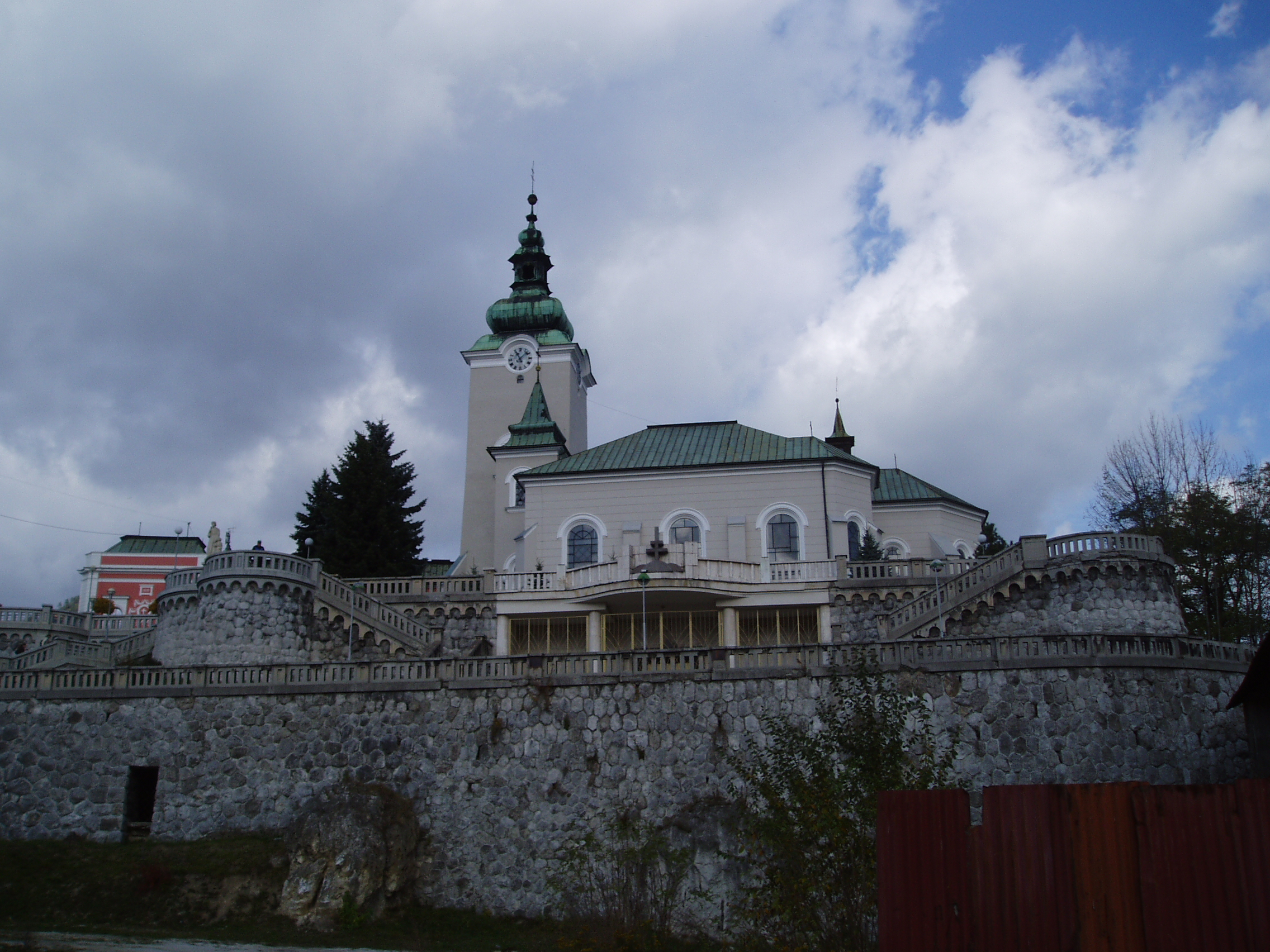
Church of St. Andrew
