= Bratislava Shooting (1919) =

The 1919 Bratislava shooting, also known as the Bloody Wednesday (Slovak: Krvavá streda), was an incident that occurred on February 12, 1919, in Bratislava (Hungarian: Pozsony; German: Pressburg, former Slovak name: Prešporok). Czechoslovak soldiers fired into an unarmed crowd of local German and Hungarian residents who were protesting the city's incorporation into the newly formed Czechoslovakia. The shooting resulted in at least nine deaths and numerous injuries, significantly escalating ethnic tensions in the city.

== Background ==
Following the end of World War I and the dissolution of Austria-Hungary, the city of Pressburg (Slovak: Prešporok, Hungarian: Pozsony) found itself in a contested position. The city's population was predominantly German and Hungarian, who wished for the city to become part of Austria, Hungary, or to be declared a free city. However, the newly established state of Czechoslovakia claimed the city as a strategic port on the Danube and designated it the capital of the Slovak region.

On January 1, 1919, the Czechoslovak Army occupied the city without resistance and it was incorporated into Czechoslovakia. The local population felt disenfranchised, and tensions grew when the Czechoslovak government scheduled municipal elections, which the German and Hungarian residents viewed as an attempt to solidify Czechoslovak control over a city where they were the majority.

== The shooting ==
In response to the political situation, German and Hungarian civic organizations called for a general strike and a public demonstration on February 12, 1919. A large, unarmed crowd of protestors gathered and marched towards the city hall (radnica) via the today's Námestie SNP to voice their opposition to the Czechoslovak administration.

The Czechoslovak military commander issued an order to prevent the demonstrators from reaching the city hall. Soldiers from the 30th Infantry Regiment of the Czechoslovak Legion, under the command of an Italian officer, Riccardo Barreca, blocked the path of the protestors. As the crowd pressed forward, the legionnaires were ordered to fire. They fired a volley directly into the unarmed crowd, causing panic and chaos.

== Victims ==
The shooting resulted in at nine confirmed deaths and ten people seriously wounded. The victims were all local German and Hungarian civilians. Among those killed was a 14-year-old girl, Karolína Jánesová, whose death highlighted the tragic nature of the event. Other victims included factory workers, apprentices, and a woman named Lujza Krivátsy.

== Aftermath ==
In the immediate aftermath of the shooting, the Czechoslovak military declared martial law in the city. A strict curfew was imposed, and all public gatherings were banned. The event deepened the resentment of the German and Hungarian population towards the new Czechoslovak state and created a lasting legacy of ethnic tension in Bratislava. While the city was successfully integrated into Czechoslovakia, the 1919 massacre remains a painful and often overlooked episode in its history.

== See also ==
- History of Bratislava
