= Liptó County =

County of the Kingdom of Hungary

Liptó County Liptó vármegye (Hungarian) Comitatus Liptoviensis (Latin) Komitat Liptau (German) Liptovská župa (Slovak)
- County of the Kingdom of Hungary
- 15th century–1920
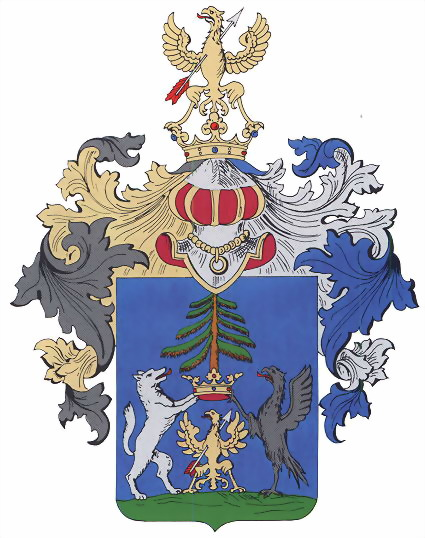
- Coat of arms

- Capital: Liptószentmiklós
- Area
  - Coordinates: 49°5′N 19°37′E
  - 1910: 2,246 km^{2} (867 sq mi)
- Population
  - 1910: 86,900
- History
  - Established: 15th century
  - Treaty of Trianon: 4 June 1920
- Today part of: Slovakia
- Liptovský Mikuláš is the current name of the capital.

Liptó County (Hungarian: Liptó vármegye, Latin: Comitatus Liptoviensis, Slovak: Liptovská župa, German: Komitat Liptau, Polish: Komitat Liptów) was an administrative county (comitatus) of the Kingdom of Hungary. Its territory is now in northern Slovakia.

== Geography ==
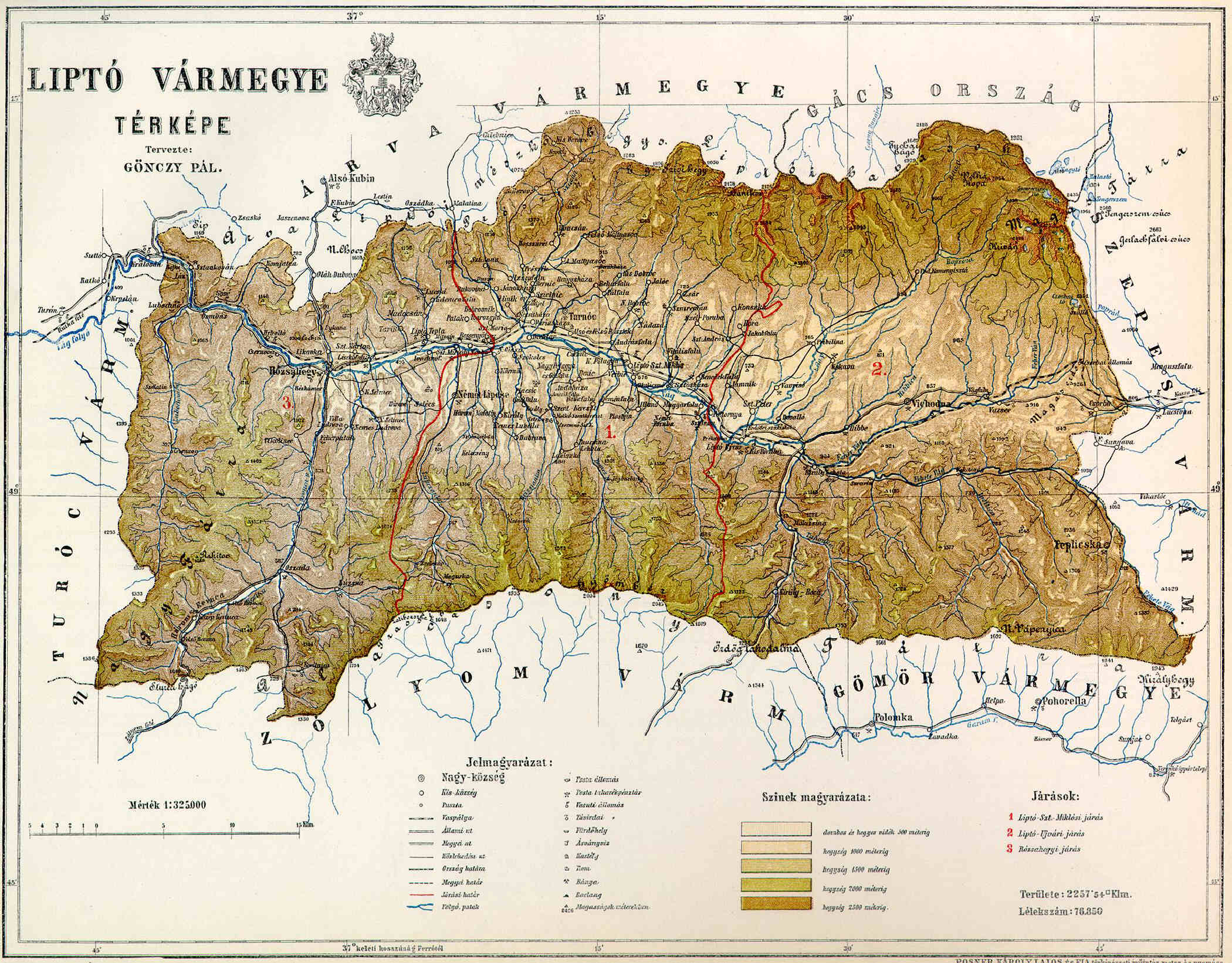
Map of Liptó, 1891.

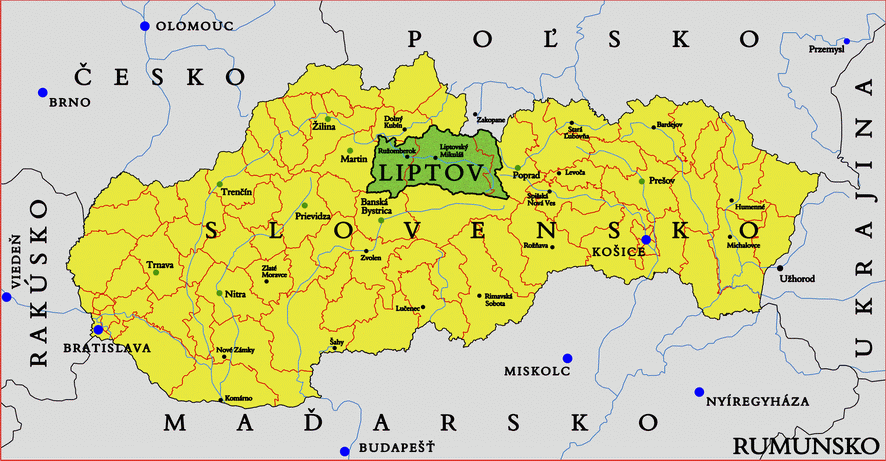
Former county of Liptó superimposed on map of contemporary Slovakia.

Liptó county shared borders with the Austrian land Galicia and the Hungarian counties Árva, Turóc, Zólyom, Gömör-Kishont and Szepes. The county's territory was situated along the upper Vág (present-day Váh) river between the High Tatras and the Low Tatras. Its area was 2,247 km^{2} around 1910.

Today, the territory of the former Liptó County largely corresponds to the Ružomberok District and Liptovský Mikuláš District in northern Slovakia. Three villages (Liptovská Teplička, Štrba and Štrbské Pleso) are now in the Poprad District.

== Capitals ==
The capitals of the county were the Liptó Castle, later Németlipcse (present-day Partizánska Ľupča), and since 1677 the capital was Liptószentmiklós (present-day Liptovský Mikuláš).

== History ==
Liptó county as a Hungarian comitatus arose before the 15th century. At various points throughout history the county was ruled by Voivodes or Counts from the Rosenberg, Csák and Benyovszky families. In the aftermath of World War I, the area became part of newly formed Czechoslovakia, as recognized by the concerned states in 1920 by the Treaty of Trianon.

== Demographics ==
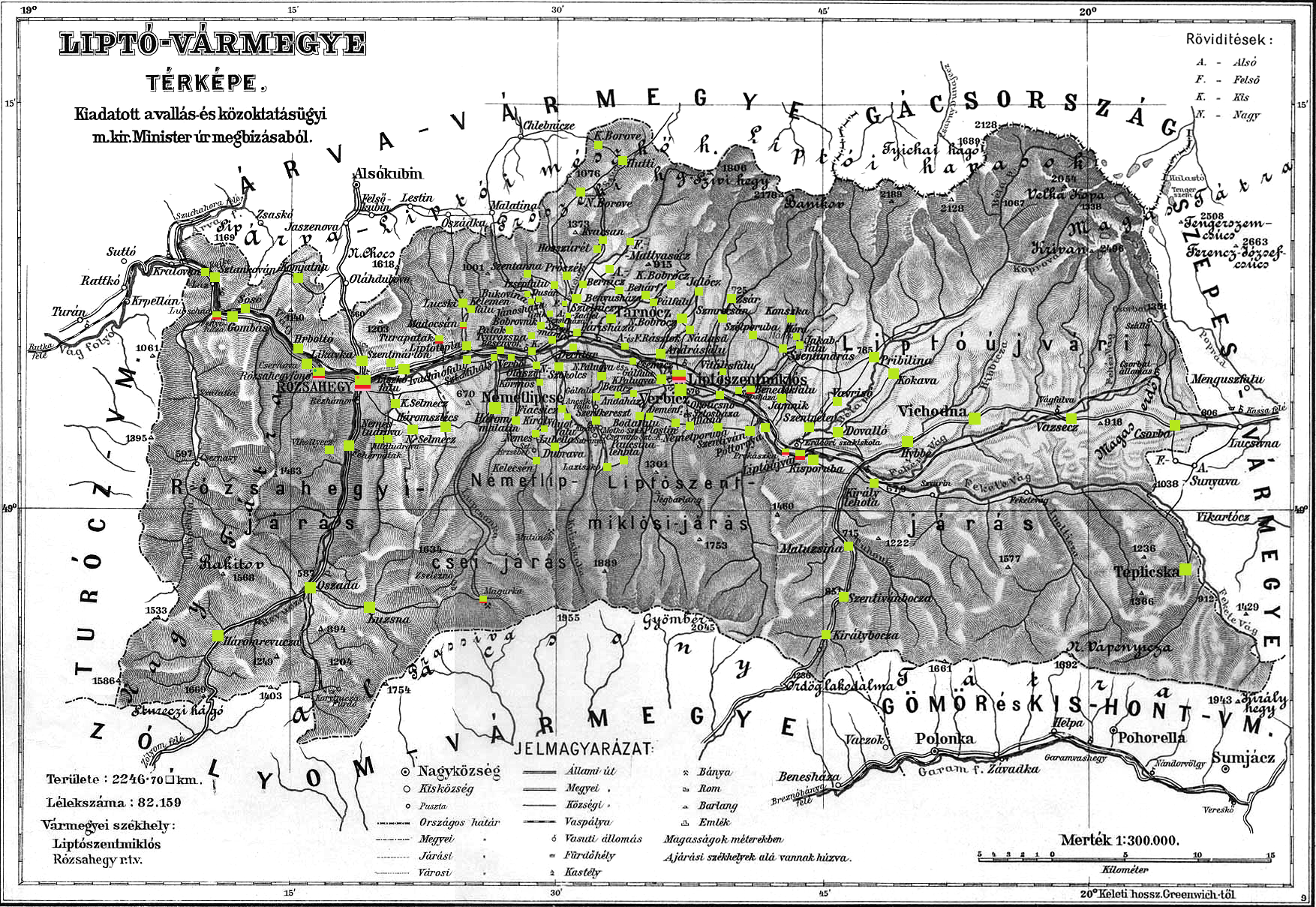
Ethnic map of the county with data of the 1910 census (see the key in the description).

Population by mother tongue (Note: Only linguistic communities > 1% are displayed.)
| Census | Total | Slovak | Hungarian | German | Other or unknown |
|---|---|---|---|---|---|
| 1880 | 74,758 | 67,554 (93.67%) | 1,438 (1.99%) | 2,775 (3.85%) | 353 (0.49%) |
| 1890 | 76,850 | 72,067 (93.78%) | 1,771 (2.30%) | 2,568 (3.34%) | 444 (0.58%) |
| 1900 | 82,159 | 75,938 (92.43%) | 2,708 (3.30%) | 2,475 (3.01%) | 1,038 (1.26%) |
| 1910 | 86,906 | 78,098 (89.86%) | 4,365 (5.02%) | 2,591 (2.98%) | 1,852 (2.13%) |

Population by religion (Note: Only religious communities > 1% are displayed.)
| Census | Total | Roman Catholic | Lutheran | Jewish | Other or unknown |
|---|---|---|---|---|---|
| 1880 | 74,758 | 38,601 (51.63%) | 32,735 (43.79%) | 3,349 (4.48%) | 73 (0.10%) |
| 1890 | 76,850 | 40,149 (52.24%) | 33,408 (43.47%) | 3,137 (4.08%) | 156 (0.20%) |
| 1900 | 82,159 | 43,979 (53.53%) | 34,953 (42.54%) | 3,092 (3.76%) | 135 (0.16%) |
| 1910 | 86,906 | 47,772 (54.97%) | 35,169 (40.47%) | 3,237 (3.72%) | 728 (0.84%) |

== Subdivisions ==
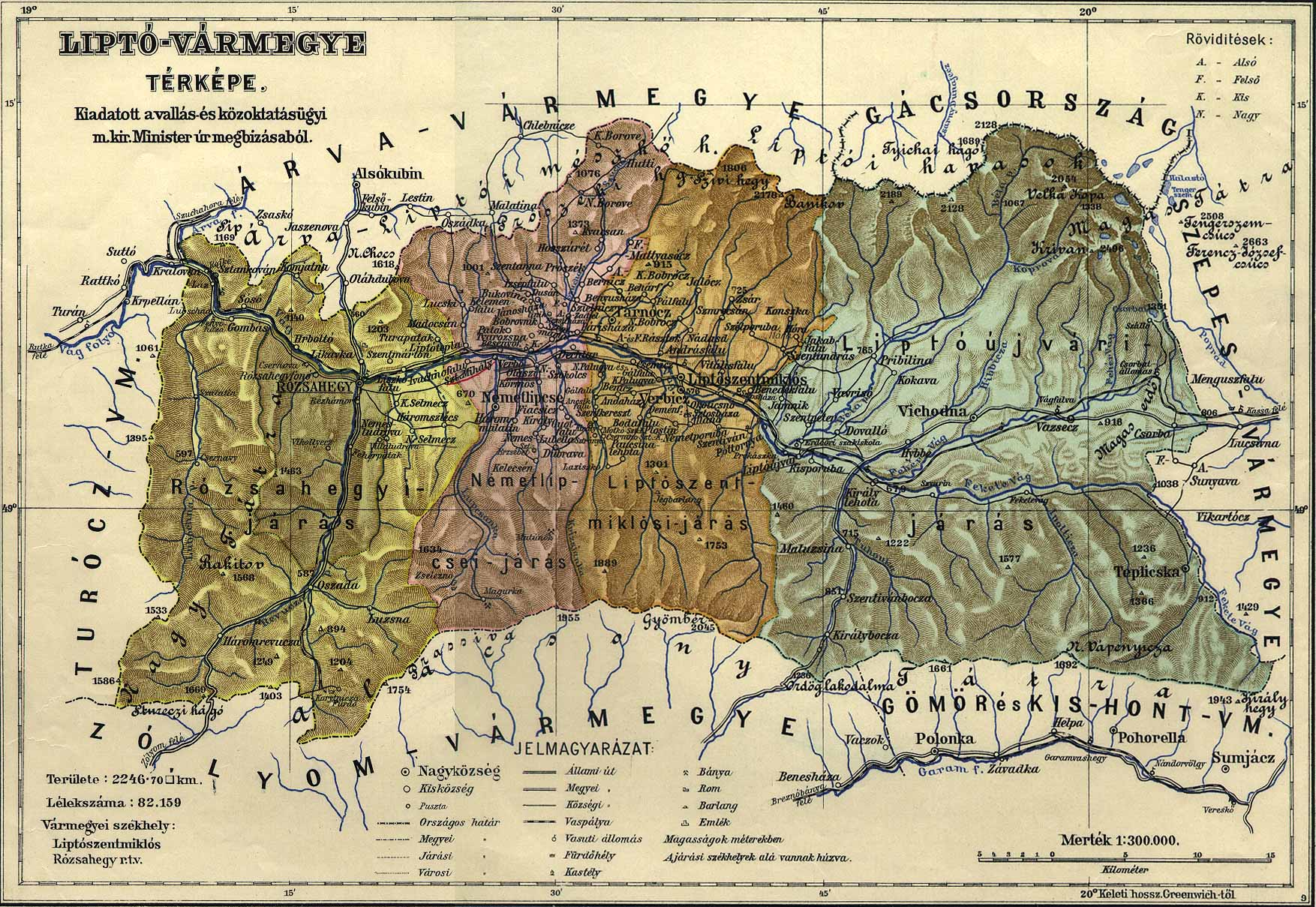

In the early 20th century, the subdivisions of Liptó County were:

Districts (járás)
| District | Capital |
|---|---|
| Liptószentmiklós | Liptószentmiklós (now Liptovský Mikuláš) |
| Liptóújvár | Liptóújvár (now Liptovský Hrádok) |
| Németlipcse | Németlipcse (now Partizánska Ľupča) |
| Rózsahegy | Rózsahegy (now Ružomberok) |
Urban districts (rendezett tanácsú város)
Rózsahegy (now Ružomberok)
