= Partizánska Ľupča =

- Municipality
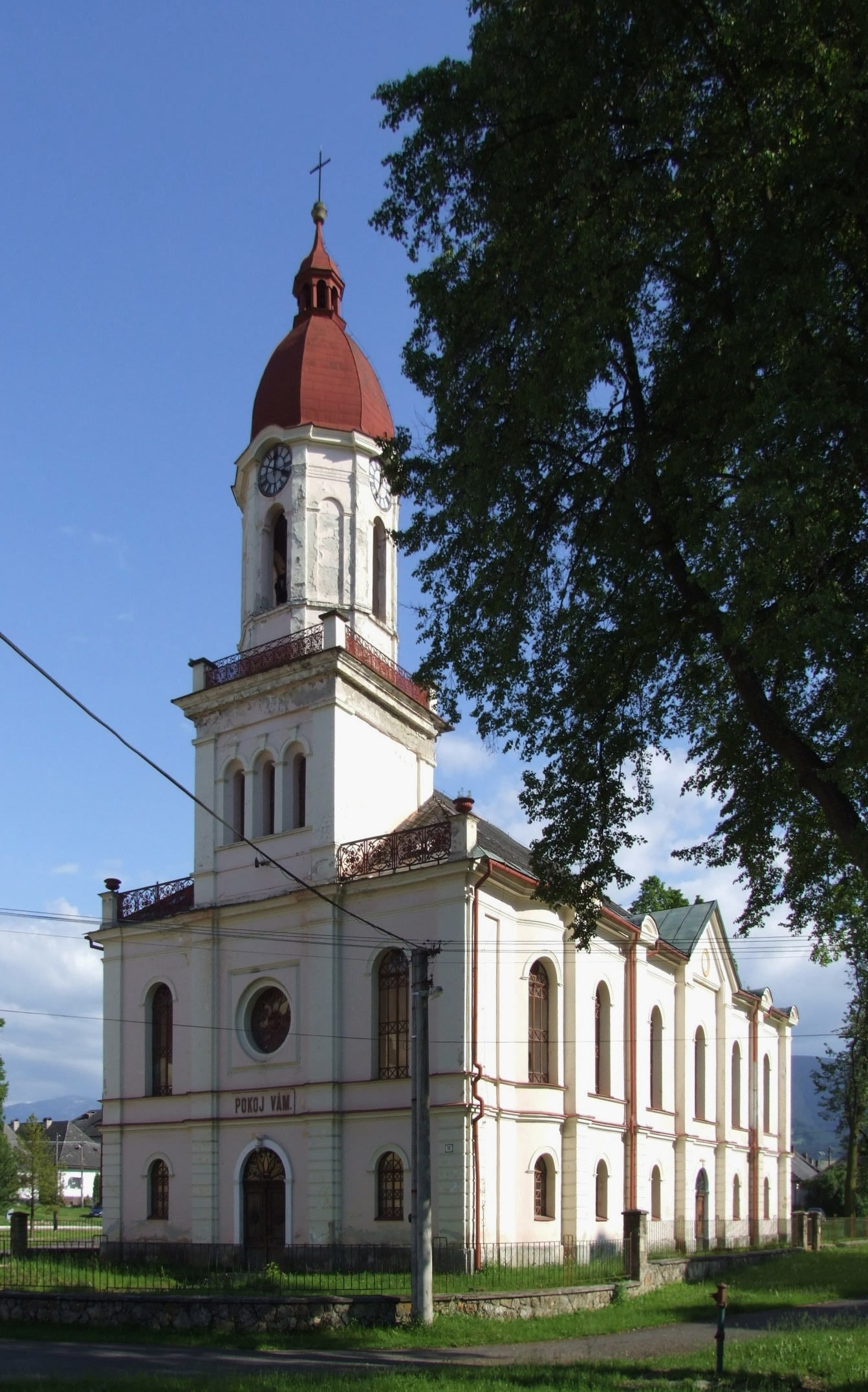

- Flag Coat of arms

- Location of Partizánska Ľupča in the Žilina Region Location of Partizánska Ľupča in Slovakia
- Coordinates: 49.06°N 19.44°E
- Country: Slovakia
- Region: Žilina Region
- District: Liptovský Mikuláš District
- First mentioned: 1252

Area
  - Total: 92.40 km^{2} (35.68 sq mi)
- Elevation: 863 m (2,831 ft)

Population (2025)
  - Total: 1,294
- Time zone: UTC+1 (CET)
  - Summer (DST): UTC+2 (CEST)
- Postal code: 321 5
- Area code: +421 44
- Vehicle registration plate (until 2022): LM
- Website: www.partizanskalupca.com

Partizánska Ľupča (until 1945 Nemecká Ľupča, Hungarian: Németlipcse, German: Deutschliptsch) is a large village and municipality in Liptovský Mikuláš District in the Žilina Region of northern Slovakia.

== Etymology ==
The name Ľupča is derived from Slavic personal name with a root Ľub. Lipche/Lypche (Lipcse) are already Hungarized forms because of contemporary practice of the Royal Estate, however also these forms were sometimes again Slovakized in medieval documents (e.g. Lipcza). The etymological adjective "Nemecká" (German) Ľupča referenced to the ethnic composition of the town in the Middle Ages. After World War II it was changed to "Partizánska" (Partisan) Ľupča thanks to its active participation in the Slovak National Uprising.

== History ==
In historical records the village was first mentioned in 1252. Before the establishment of independent Czechoslovakia in 1918, it was part of Liptó County within the Kingdom of Hungary. From 1939 to 1945, it was part of the Slovak Republic.

== Geography ==
The municipality lies at an altitude of 863 metres (2,831 ft) and covers an area of 92.40 km^{2} (35.68 sq mi) (2025).

== Population ==
Population statistic (10 years)
Year	1995	2005	2015	2025
Count	1278	1239	1237	1294
Difference		−3.05%	−0.16%	+4.60%

Population statistic
Year	2024	2025
Count	1299	1294
Difference		−0.38%

It has a population of 1294 people (31 December 2025).

=== Ethnicity ===
Census 2021 (1+ %)
Ethnicity	Number	Fraction
Slovak	1274	96.66%
Not found out	44	3.33%
Total	1318	

In year 2021 was 1318 people by ethnicity 1274 as Slovak, 44 as Not found out, 6 as Czech, 5 as Polish, 1 as Ukrainian, 1 as Serbian and 1 as Rusyn.

Note on population: The difference values of population numbers in the table "Population statistic" and in the sections "Ethnicity" & "Religion" is caused by the use of various statistical methods.

=== Religion ===
Census 2021 (1+ %)
Religion	Number	Fraction
Roman Catholic Church	841	63.81%
None	218	16.54%
Evangelical Church	184	13.96%
Not found out	49	3.72%
Total	1318	

In year 2021 was 1318 people by religion 841 from Roman Catholic Church, 218 from None, 184 from Evangelical Church, 49 from Not found out, 7 from Greek Catholic Church, 4 from Other and not ascertained christian church, 4 from Other, 3 from Christian Congregations in Slovakia, 3 from Ad hoc movements, 2 from Eastern Orthodox Church, 2 from Buddhism and 1 from Islam.
