= Roller coaster (disambiguation) =

A roller coaster is a type of amusement ride.

Roller coaster may also refer to:

== Roller coasters ==
- Roller Coaster (Dai Nam Van Hien), a steel roller coaster in Bình Dương, Vietnam
- Roller Coaster (Dam Sen Park), a steel roller coaster in Ho Chi Minh City, Vietnam
- Roller Coaster (Great Yarmouth Pleasure Beach), a wooden roller coaster in Great Yarmouth UK
- Roller Coaster (Lagoon), a wooden roller coaster in Farmington, Utah, US
- Roller Coaster (Suoi Tien Park), a steel roller coaster in Ho Chi Minh City, Vietnam
- The Roller Coaster, a steel roller coaster at the New York-New York Hotel & Casino on the Las Vegas Strip

== Film and television ==
- Rollercoaster (1977 film), a film by James Goldstone
- Rollercoaster (1999 film), a film by Scott Smith
- Rollercoaster (TV series), a 2005–2010 Australian children's show
- "Rollercoaster" (Phineas and Ferb), a 2007 television episode or its 2011 musical version, "Rollercoaster: The Musical"

== Music ==
- Rollercoaster (Australian festival), an annual music festival
- Roller Coaster, a South Korean jazz-influenced synth-pop band active from the late 1990s to the 2000s.

=== Albums ===
- Rollercoaster (Jim Verraros album), 2005
- Rollercoaster (Let Loose album) or the title song, 1996
- Rollercoaster (Randy Rogers Band album), 2004
- Roller Coaster (Red Bacteria Vacuum album) or the title song, 2006
- Roller Coaster (Scott Cain album) or the title song, 2004
- Rollercoaster (soundtrack) or the title track, from the 1977 film, by Lalo Schifrin
- Rollercoaster (EP) or the title song, by The Jesus and Mary Chain, 1990
- Red House Painters (Rollercoaster) or the title song, by Red House Painters, 1993
- Rollercoaster, by the Adicts, 2004

=== Songs ===
- "Rollercoaster" (B*Witched song), 1998
- "Roller Coaster" (Chungha song), 2018
- "Rollercoaster" (Dolly Style song), 2016
- "Roller Coaster" (Erika Jayne song), 2007
- "Rollercoaster" (Julian Le Play song), 2014
- "Roller Coaster" (Justin Bieber song), 2013
- "Roller Coaster" (Luke Bryan song), 2014
- "Roller Coaster" (Nmixx song), 2023
- "Roller Coaster" (Toni Braxton and Babyface song), 2014
- "Rollercoaster" (Woo!ah! song), 2022
- "Roller Coaster", by the 13th Floor Elevators from The Psychedelic Sounds of the 13th Floor Elevators, 1966
- "Rollercoaster", by Best Coast from Always Tomorrow, 2020
- "Rollercoaster", by Black Mountain from Wilderness Heart, 2010
- "Rollercoaster", by Bleachers from Strange Desire, 2014
- "Roller Coaster", by Blink-182 from Take Off Your Pants and Jacket, 2001
- "Roller Coaster", by Bon Jovi from This House Is Not for Sale, 2016
- "Roller Coaster", by Exo-XC from What a Life, 2019
- "Rollercoaster", by the Grid from Evolver, 1994
- "Rollercoaster", by Machine Gun Fellatio from Paging Mr Strike, 2003
- "Rollercoaster", by Janet Jackson from Discipline, 2008
- "Rollercoaster", by the Jonas Brothers from Happiness Begins, 2019
- "Rollercoaster", by Sleater-Kinney from The Woods, 2005
- "Roller Coaster", by TXT from The Dream Chapter: Magic, 2019
- "Rollercoaster", by Spacemen 3 from Sound of Confusion, 1986
- "Rollercoaster", from the Phineas and Ferb episode "Rollercoaster: The Musical!", 2011
- "Rollercoaster", by Josh Panda which represented Vermont in the American Song Contest
- "Rollercoaster", by Ian Van Dahl from Lost & Found, 2004

== Other uses ==
- "Roller Coaster" (game) or "Down Down Baby", a song and clapping game
- Roller Coaster (video game), a 1985 video game
- Operation Roller Coaster, a series of nuclear tests carried out at the NTS, 1963

== See also ==
- "Love Rollercoaster", a 1975 song by The Ohio Players
- RollerCoaster Tycoon (series), a trilogy of video games
