= 1918 in Czechoslovakia =

- Decades: 1910s; 1920s; 1930s
- See also: Other events of 1918; History of Czechoslovakia; Years in Czechoslovakia

Events from the year 1918 in Czechoslovakia. The year was marked by the Czechoslovak declaration of independence and the Martin Declaration. The year also saw the election of the first President and Prime Minister of Czechoslovakia, Tomáš Masaryk and Karel Kramář respectively.

== Incumbents ==
- President: Tomáš Masaryk (position established on 14 November).
- Prime Minister: Karel Kramář (position established on 14 November).

== Events ==
- 22 May – Robert Cecil recognises right of the Czech and Slovak people for full independence on behalf of the Foreign Office.
- 30 May – The Pittsburgh Agreement is signed by representatives of the Czech and Slovak communities in the United States, approving the formation of a state for both.
- 4 July – At a mass meeting in Independence Hall in Philadelphia, the Czechoslovak National Council issue a formal declaration of independence.
- 28 October – The formal declaration is made that the Czech and Slovak people are to no longer part of Austria-Hungary and instead the new state of Czechoslovakia.
- 31 October – The Martin Declaration declares Slovak independence from Hungary and adherence to the new state.
- 5 November:
  - The Evangelical Church of Czech Brethren is founded by the merger of many Protestant denominations.
  - Czech gendarmes cross the Moravian-Hungarian border into Upper Hungary.
- 8 November – The Czechoslovak War Cross 1918 is created for acts of military valour during the First World War.
- 13 November – The Provisional Constitution provides the new President of Czechoslovakia with executive powers, including the right to appoint cabinets.
- 14 November – A National Assembly is created with 260 delegates. A new cabinet is formed under Prime Minister Karel Kramář.
- 4 December – The Allies recognise Czechoslovakia as the successor to the Austria-Hungary in Bohemia and Slovakia.
- 21 December – Tomáš Masaryk rejects requests for Czechoslovakia to join the new Republic of German-Austria.

== Popular culture ==
=== Art ===
- Alphonse Mucha paints Petr Chelčický at Vodňany and The Last days of Jan Amos Komenský [Comenius] in Naarden, part of The Slav Epic.

=== Music ===
- Bohuslav Martinů composes Czech Rhapsody, Magic Nights and Puppets.
- Leoš Janáček's Taras Bulba is first performed.

== Births ==
- 24 February – Svatopluk Beneš, actor (died 2007).
- 13 August – Gertrude Kleinová, thrice World Champion table tennis player (died 1976).

== Deaths ==
- 27 April – Jan Preisler, artist (born 1872).
