= Der Wolf =

Der Wolf may refer to:

- Der Wolf (rapper) (born 1973), German rapper
- "Der Wolf" (song), a 2013 song by Julian Le Play
