= Michal Miloslav Hodža =

Slovak revolutionary, Lutheran priest and writer (1811–1870)

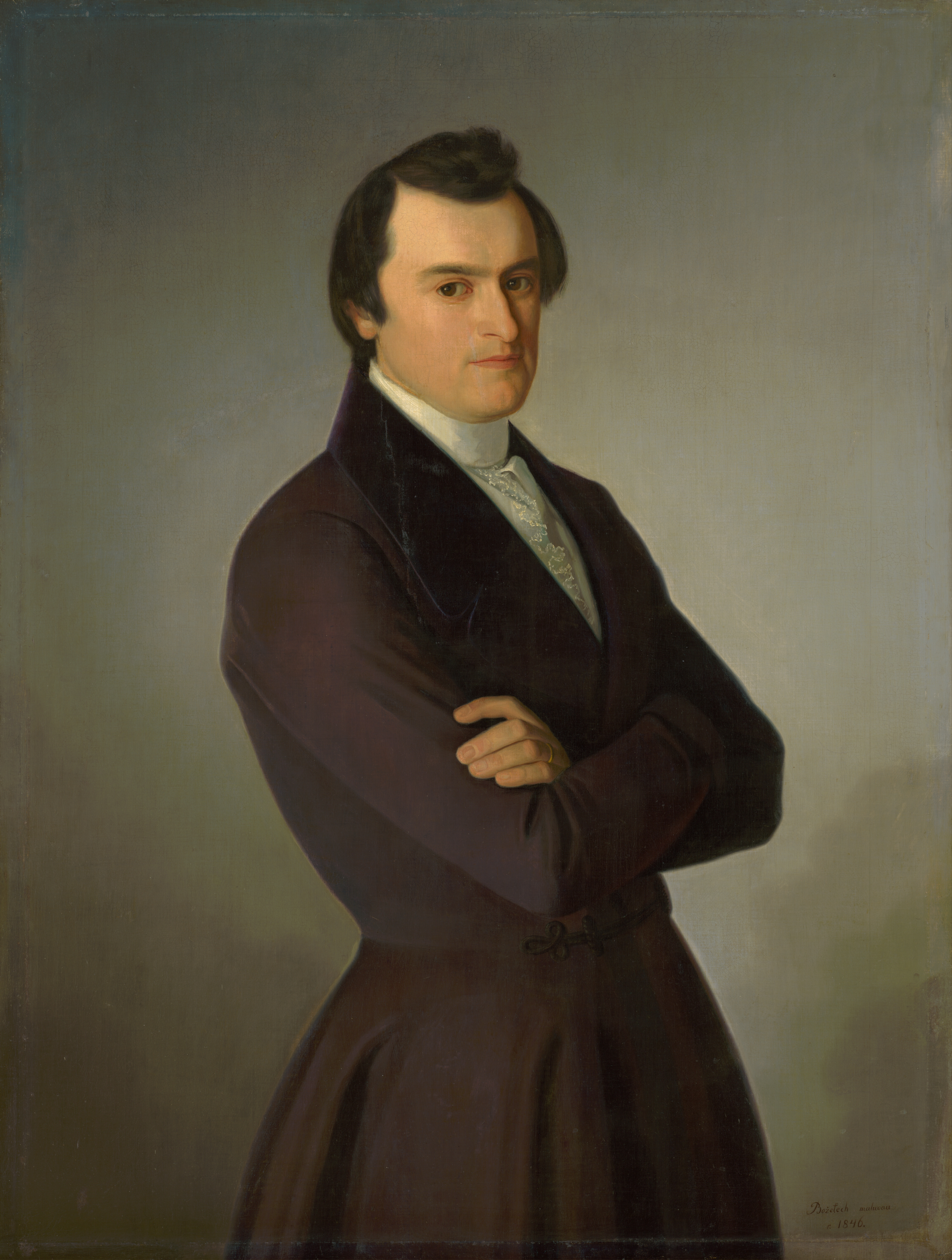
- Portrait by Jozef Božetech Klemens
- Born: 22 September 1811; Raksa, Turóc County, Kingdom of Hungary
- Died: 26 March 1870 (aged 58); Cieszyn, Austrian Silesia, Austria-Hungary
- Occupations: Priest, poet, linguist and Slovak National Revivalist

Michal Miloslav Hodža (Hungarian: Hodzsa Mihály Milos; 22 September 1811 – 26 March 1870) was a Slovak national revivalist, Lutheran pastor, poet, linguist, and representative of the Slovak national movement in 1840s as a member of "the trinity" Štúr-Hurban-Hodža. He is also the uncle of Czechoslovak politician Milan Hodža.

== Life ==
=== Early years ===
Michal Miloslav Hodža was born on 22 September 1811 in Raksa, Kingdom of Hungary (now Rakša, Slovakia). He came from the a family of farmer-millers while his father was also a non-commissioned officer. His surname (meaning master or teacher in Turkish) was given to his ancestors at the times of the Ottomans conquest and rule. Hodža studied in Rakša, Mošovce and later, at gymnasiums in Banská Bystrica and Rožňava. In the years 1829–1832 he continued his studies, focusing on theology, at the Evangelical college in Prešov. From 1832 to 1834 he continued to study theology at the Evangelical lyceum in Bratislava. During his study in Bratislava he began to work for the Czechoslovak Language and Literature Company. Also during his time at the lyceum, Hodža was a chairman's deputy of the same association. In the years 1834–1836 he worked as a tutor in Rakša and Podrečany. From 1834 to 1837 he continued his theological studies in Vienna, where he was ordained a priest in 1837. In the late 1830s he published in educational and didactic magazines such as Krasomil, Vedomil tatranský, Slovenské noviny and Slovenská včela. He was also a co-author of Prosbopis liptovského seniorátu whose purpose was to restore the Department of the Czechoslovak language and literature at the Bratislava lyceum. In 1840 he was made a Dean of Liptov seniorate and an envoy for district's convents. Only a year thereafter he became a member of the editorial staff of the evangelical magazine Spěvník. In 1842, Hodža settled in the parsonage in Liptovský Mikuláš where he would stay with brief interruptions until 1866. In the same year he became a member of the deputation of Slovak evangelical scholars to the Austrian monarch. In the summer of 1843 Hodža met with Ľudovít Štúr and Jozef Miloslav Hurban in the parsonage of Hlboké village where he took part in the decision making process about the formation of the modern literary Slovak language and the publication of Slovak newspapers. A second meeting was held a year later, this time in Hodža's home at Liptovský Mikuláš, which lasted from 26 to 28 August 1844. At that meeting, the trio of Hurban, Štúr and Hodža founded a cultural and educational association, called the Tatrín Cultural-Enlightenment Society, of which Hodža became the first chairman.

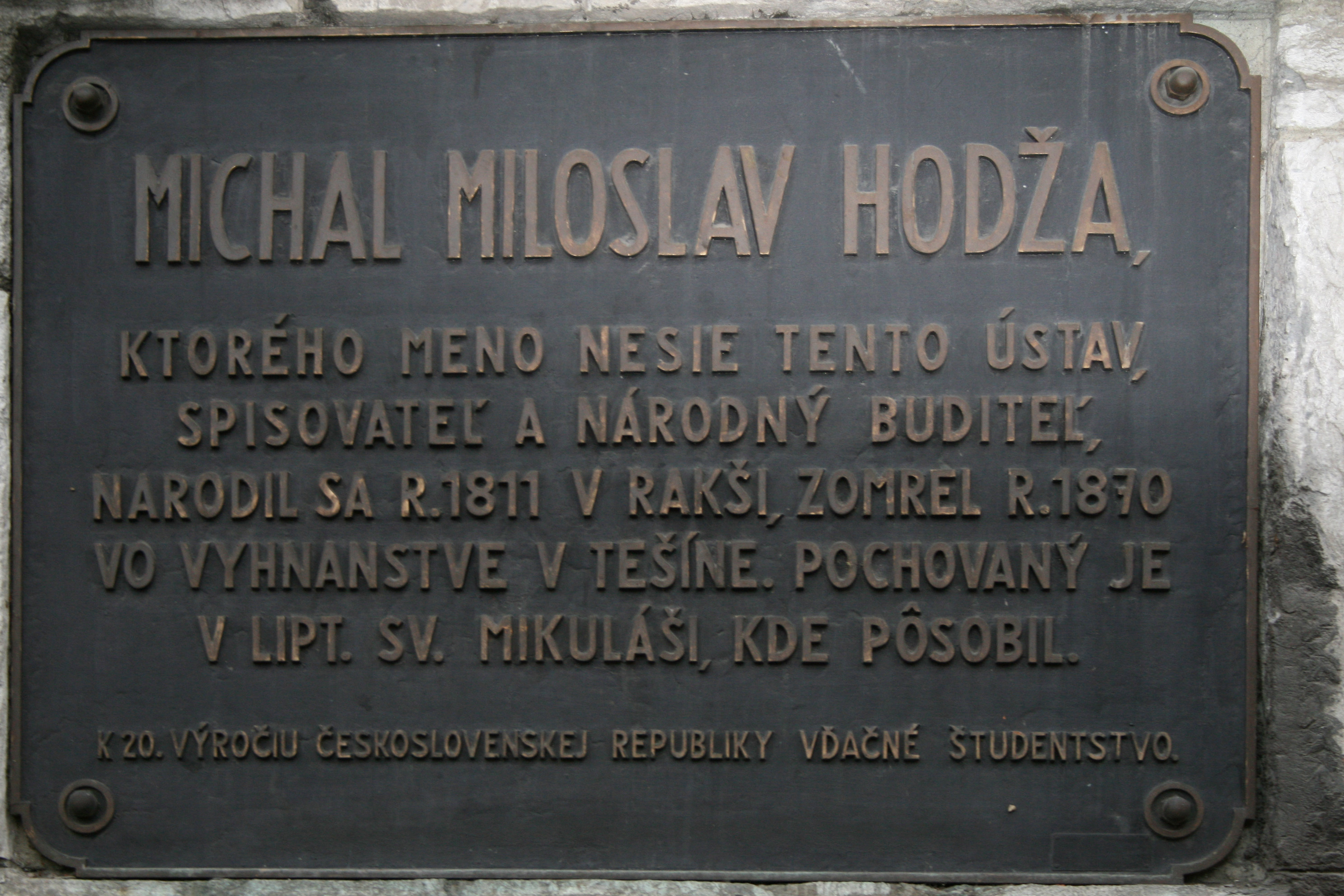
Plaque dedicated to Michal Miloslav Hodža in Liptovský Mikuláš

=== During the revolution of 1848–1849 ===
During the revolutionary period of 1848–1849, Hodža had participated with great merit in the meeting of patriots (10–12 May 1848) and organization thereof in Liptovský Mikuláš. During the meeting, and in the presence of Štúr and Hurban, all 14 articles of Demands of the Slovak Nation (Slovak: Žiadosti slovenského národa), which contained proposals to solve the status of Slovak nation within the scope of Hungary, were approved of. After the proclamation of martial law, a direct response to the Demands, Hodža decided to leave for Prague in order to avoid the police prosecution as his position as a leader within the revolution made him a prime target. While in Prague, Hodža actively participated in the negotiations at the Slavic Congress and in the summer preparations of the Slovak armed uprising. He became a member of the first Slovak National Council and also became an active participant of the Slovak volunteer armed uprisings in the years 1848–1849. This involved the joining of the Austrian Emperor's troops though he did not agree with the policy of solving issues by means of an armed conflict. The armed approach was markedly more favored by both Štúr and Hurban.

=== Later life ===
After the defeat of the Hungarian rebellion he returned to Liptovský Mikuláš and in the years 1849–1850 was a notary public of the Liptó County. He refused to support Hungarian side, which led to his decision to leave the office and proceed with the new actions in the national-revivalist campaign in the ecclesiastic, social and cultural field. This led to new conflicts and even to physical violence that Hodža had to face himself. In the years 1863–1867 he was one of the founding member and a committee member of Matica slovenská. In 1866 became vicar of the evangelical church in Martin. However, due to his participation in the so-called 'patent' wars, which was the Emperor's regulation on the arrangement of Church matters, he was suspended and forced to leave his parsonage. From 1867 until his death he remained in exile in Silesian town Cieszyn (then within the so-called Cisleithanian part of the Austria-Hungary, i.e. although still in one monarchy but away from Hungarian authorities), where he was dedicated only to his literary work. At the beginning of 1870 he fell ill. He died in Cieszyn on 26 March 1870. He was buried in Cieszyn, but in 1922 his remains were moved to Liptovský Mikuláš.

== Legacy ==
Hodžovo námestie, a major square in Bratislava, the capital of Slovakia, is named after him.
