= Mein Anker =

Single by Julian Le Play

from the album Melodrom
- Released: 31 January 2014
- Recorded: 2012/13
- Genre: Pop
- Length: 4:06
- Label: GRIDmusic
- Songwriter(s): Julian Heidrich
- Producer(s): Lukas Hillebrand; Alex Pohn

Julian Le Play singles chronology
"Der Wolf" (2013)	"Mein Anker" (2014)	"Rollercoaster" (2014)

"Mein Anker" is a song performed by Austrian singer-songwriter and radio presenter Julian Le Play. The song was released as a digital download on 31 January 2014 as the second single from his second studio album Melodrom (2014). The song has peaked to number 6 on the Austrian Singles Chart.

== Music video ==
A music video to accompany the release of "Mein Anker" was first released onto YouTube on 31 January 2014 at a total length of four minutes and twenty-seven seconds.

== Track listing ==
Digital download
No.	Title	Length
1.	"Mein Anker"	4:06

== Chart performance ==
Chart (2014)	Peak position
Austria (Ö3 Austria Top 40)	6

== Release history ==
Region	Date	Format	Label
Austria	31 January 2014	Digital download	GRIDmusic
