= Slovak National Council =

The Slovak National Council (Slovak: Slovenská národná rada, SNR) was an organisation that was formed at various times in the 19th and 20th centuries to act as the highest representative of the Slovak nation. It originated in the mid-19th century as a focus for Slovak nationalist aspirations to break away from the Kingdom of Hungary but its bid for independence was suppressed. The second SNR was more successful, issuing a celebrated declaration of Slovak independence in 1918, though it too was ultimately dissolved by the state after Czechoslovakia was formed. The third SNR coordinated Slovak resistance to the Nazis and their Slovak puppet government, and evolved into a Communist-controlled organ of state power after the Second World War. Following the 1989 Velvet Revolution it was transformed into the new democratically elected Slovak parliament. A number of mostly short-lived and not particularly influential Slovak National Councils were also proclaimed abroad between the 1920s and 1940s, the last one seeking to mobilise Slovak émigré resistance to Communist rule.

== First Slovak National Council (1848–49) ==
Flag of Slovak volunteers

The SNR was first established during the revolutions of 1848 in the Habsburg areas, when Ľudovít Štúr, Jozef Miloslav Hurban and Michal Miloslav Hodža founded it in Vienna on 15 September 1848 during the Revolutions of 1848. It called for the establishment of autonomy for the Slovak people within the Kingdom of Hungary and promoted a document known as the Demands of the Slovak Nation. On 19 September, the SNR declared in an assembly held at Myjava that Slovakia would separate from Hungary and called for a national Slovak uprising. It had executive power in Western parts of Upper Hungary (today mostly Slovakia) occupied by united Austrian-Slovak forces within their fight against the Hungarians. The first meeting on the territory of contemporary Slovakia was in the house of Mrs. Koléniová in Myjava (then Miava).

On 19 September 1848, the first national gathering of Slovaks took place in Myjava as part of the First Slovak Volunteer Campaign (from Vienna via Moravia to Slovakia). Ľudovít Štúr declared the independence of the Slovak nation from Hungary at the gathering. However, the Slovak National Council administered only Myjava and its surroundings, and the volunteers were defeated after a few days.

A militia was formed in Vienna and marched into western Slovakia, where people from the Czech lands, Moravia and Slovakia joined it in a bid to foment an uprising. The Hungarian army was able to put down the uprising within a month and forced the militia to retreat to Moravia, executing two of its leaders and depriving Štúr, Hurban and Hodža of their citizenship on the grounds of treason. Military engagements continued through the winter and into 1849, but the Slovaks were fully defeated by November 1849. The SNR found itself unable to exercise much authority and ceased to operate by the spring of 1849. Following the suppression of the uprisings in Hungary and Slovakia, the new Austro-Hungarian Emperor, Franz Josef I, sought to co-opt the three Slovak leaders by offering them positions in the state administration. They refused, insisting on their previous demands of a separate Slovak territory within the empire. The Austrian government put them under close surveillance and they were forced to retire from politics.

There is a commemorative tablet to the council near the Karlskirche in Vienna.

== Second Slovak National Council (1914–19) ==
The second SNR was established on 26 May 1914 under Matúš Dula. The outbreak of the First World War a few months later meant that it remained inactive for the next four years, when the Slovaks fought for the Central Powers as part of the Austro-Hungarian Empire. The final months of the war saw the gradual disintegration of the empire and the revitalisation of the SNR. At a meeting held in Budapest on 12 September 1918, twelve representatives of Slovak parties were nominated to serve as members of the council. It was officially constituted in the town of Turčiansky Svätý Martin (now Martin, Slovakia) on 29 October and the following day issued the Martin Declaration, in effect declaring Slovakia's independence and presaging Slovakia's unification with the Czech lands as part of the new state of Czechoslovakia. The occupation of Martin by Hungarian troops prevented the SNR doing much following the declaration, other than issuing around 200 directives, and it was dissolved by the new Czechoslovak government on 8 January 1919 as part of a centralising drive by Vavro Šrobár, the government's Minister for Slovakia.

== Third Slovak National Council (1943–92) ==
In September 1943 the SNR was again constituted to serve as a forum for resistance to the pro-Nazi puppet regime of the Slovak Republic. Its leadership was shared by Karol Šmidke, representing the Communists, and Jozef Lettrich, representing the non-communists. The creation of the council followed the pattern set in Bulgaria and Yugoslavia, in which the Communists set themselves at the head of a notionally politically diverse popular front to resist Nazi rule. It characterized its task as being "to guide the struggle of the Slovak people and at an appropriate moment to take over power and transfer it to the elected representatives of the people". The SNR issued the so-called "Christmas Agreement" setting out a programme for re-establishing Slovakia as part of a reconstituted Czechoslovak state under democratic rule, a stance which was supported by all the major anti-fascist forces. It recognised the leadership of the exiled Czechoslovak leader Eduard Beneš, though he was reluctant to recognise it in return.

Following the launch of the Slovak National Uprising in 1944, the SNR took charge of areas liberated by the resistance. In February 1945 its representatives set themselves up in Košice to take full control of Slovakia. Its membership grew from an initial 41 to 100, split evenly between Communists and non-Communists, with a Board of Commissioners to act as its executive body. Its powers were gradually restricted under the Prague Agreements of 1945–46 and following the Czechoslovak coup d'état of 1948, when the Communists seized power, the SNR became an instrument of the Communist regime.

This situation persisted until the Velvet Revolution of 1989, when the Communists lost power. A constitutional law passed in 1990 restored many of the SNR's former powers and transformed it into a democratically elected parliament, the first free elections to which were held in June 1990. It was renamed the National Council of the Slovak Republic on 1 September 1992 after a new Slovak constitution was promulgated; Slovakia became independent from Czechoslovakia four months later on 1 January 1993.

== Slovak National Councils abroad ==
Four Slovak National Councils were also proclaimed abroad at various times between 1920 and 1948. The first was established by František Jehlička in Warsaw in May 1920 but failed to attract support from Slovaks abroad and was dissolved by 1922. Milan Hodža established the second in Paris on 22 November 1939, with himself as president and Peter Prídavok as secretary. Hodža sought to outline proposals for a post-war Czechoslovak state based on the Žilina Agreement. However, it was superseded by the creation on 28 January 1940 of a Czecho-Slovak National Council, headed by Hodža, and its presence in France was ended by the country's defeat in the Battle of France six months later. The third SNR abroad was founded in London by Peter Prídavok on 31 December 1943 and advocated that Slovakia should become an independent state in a federated Central Europe. The Czechoslovak government in exile refused to recognise it and it played no part in determining Slovakia's post-war settlement.

The fourth and final SNR abroad was the only one to be officially termed the Slovak National Council Abroad (Slovak: Slovenská národná rada v zahraniči, SNRvZ). It was founded in Rome in May 1948 after the Communist coup in Czechoslovakia, with Karol Sidor, Konštantin Čulen, Jozef Kirschbaum and others as founder members. It sought to restore Slovak statehood and to mobilise Slovak émigrés abroad, through its branches in West Germany, Argentina, Canada, the United States and other countries where Slovaks had settled. In September 1948 it merged with Prídavok's Slovak National Council. A further merger took place in 1960 when the Slovak Liberation Committee joined it to form the Slovak Liberation Council.

== See also ==
- National Council of the Slovak Republic
