= Roller Coaster (Dai Nam Van Hien) =

Tàu Lộn Vòng Siêu Tốc

Đại Nam Văn Hiến
- Location: Đại Nam Văn Hiến
- Coordinates: 11.043327°N 106.632535°E
- Status: Operating
- Opening date: 11 September 2008
- Cost: VND 25 billions

General statistics
- Type: Steel
- Manufacturer: Hebei Zhongye Metallurgical Equipment
- Lift/launch system: Chain lift
- Height: 33.6 m (110 ft)
- Drop: 30 m (98 ft)
- Length: 680 m (2,230 ft)
- Speed: 75 km/h (47 mph)
- Inversions: 4
- Duration: 2:00
- Max vertical angle: 50°
- Capacity: 1440 riders per hour
- G-force: 4.0
- Height restriction: 54 in (137 cm)
- Tàu Lộn Vòng Siêu Tốc at RCDB

Roller Coaster (Vietnamese: Tàu Lộn Vòng Siêu Tốc) is a steel roller coaster located at Đại Nam Văn Hiến in Bình Dương, Vietnam. The ride was built in late 2008. Prior to 2017, it was the tallest coaster in Vietnam. Prior to that, it was also the fastest roller coaster, and the one with the most inversions, in Vietnam.

Except for the second loop the ride is almost an exact duplicate of a similar roller coaster at Dam Sen Cultural Park.

== Ride experience ==
The ride begins with a small drop, before the trains make a sharp U-turn to the right. Riders immediately climb the lift hill . Trains again make a small drop, and another turn to the right, this is followed by a 27-metre drop. Trains then go through the double loop, the first of its kind in Vietnam. Then comes a double corkscrew, inverting the riders twice. Riders experience another large turn before coming to a stop.

== See also ==
Some roller coasters with similar track layout:

- Corkscrew (Cedar Point)
- Carolina Cyclone (mirror image)
- Roller Coaster (Dam Sen Park)
