= 1919 in Czechoslovakia =

- Decades: 1910s; 1920s; 1930s
- See also: Other events of 1919; History of Czechoslovakia; Years in Czechoslovakia

Events from the year 1919 in Czechoslovakia. The year saw the Treaty of Saint-Germain-en-Laye define the borders of the state and the Treaty of Versailles recognise its independence.

== Incumbents ==
- President: Tomáš Masaryk.
- Prime Minister:
  - Karel Kramář (until 8 July).
  - Vlastimil Tusar (from 8 July).

== Events ==
- 28 January – Masaryk University is founded in Brno.
- 12 March – The Commission on Czecho-Slovak Affairs report reports the border of the new state of Czechoslovakia.
- 21 March – Conflict breaks out between the Hungarian Soviet Republic and Czechoslovakia.
- 4 May - Many ethnic Germans in the Province of German Bohemia demonstrated peacefully demonstrated its right for self determination. The mass demonstrations were put down by the Czech military, involving 54 deaths and 84 wounded.
- 8 May – The leaders of Carpathian Ruthenia join their country to Czechoslovakia.
- 16 June – The Slovak Soviet Republic is declared in Prešov. The state had collapsed by August.
- 27 June – Comenius University is founded in Bratislava.
- 28 June – The signing of the Treaty of Versailles recognises the independence of the Czechoslovakia.
- 10 September – The Treaty of Saint-Germain-en-Laye is signed, which defines the borders of Czechoslovakia.
- 25 September – The Brno Conservatory is founded with composer Leoš Janáček as the first professor.
- 25 November – The Evangelical Church of Czech Brethren is recognised by the state and attracts one-sixth of the members of the Catholic Church.

== Popular culture ==
=== Art ===
- Alphonse Mucha's The Slav Epic is shown for the first time.

=== Music ===
- Bohuslav Martinů's Czech Rhapsody is first performed.
- Leoš Janáček's song cycle The Diary of One Who Disappeared is first performed. He starts composing the opera Káťa Kabanová.

== Births ==
- 8 May – Hildegard Neumann, overseer at Nazi concentration camps (died 2010).
- 2 June – Florence Marly, actor (died 1978).
- 1 November – Ruth Elfriede Hildner, guard at Nazi concentration camps (died 1947).
- 5 December – Heda Margolius Kovály, writer and translator (died 2010).

== Deaths ==
- 4 May – Milan Rastislav Štefánik, aviator and astronomer, first Minister of War (born 1880).
