= Jozef Miloslav Hurban =

Slovak journalist, politician, and priest (1817–1888)

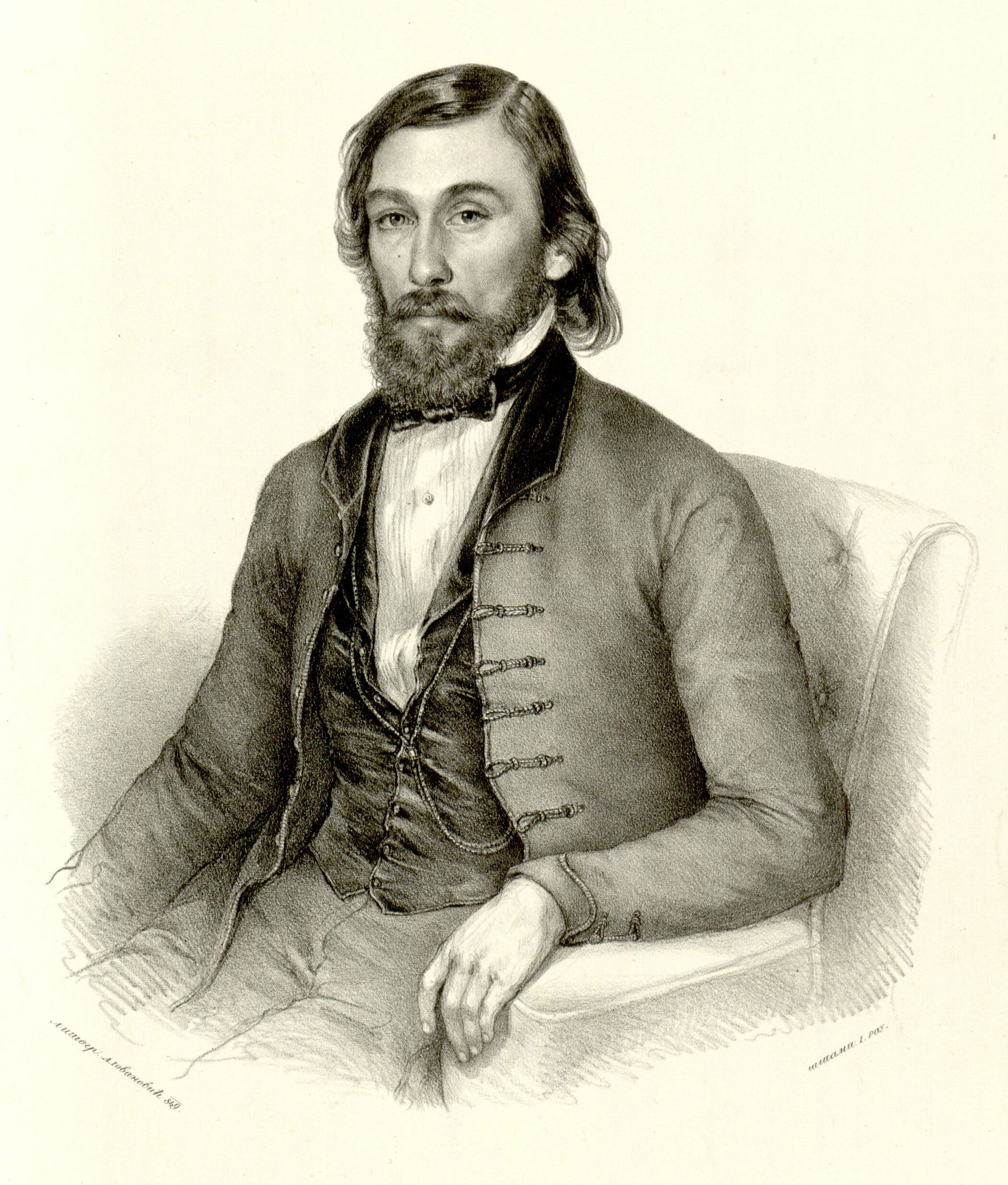
- Born: 19 March 1817; Beckó, Kingdom of Hungary, Austrian Empire
- Died: 21 February 1888 (aged 70); Luboka, Kingdom of Hungary, Austria-Hungary

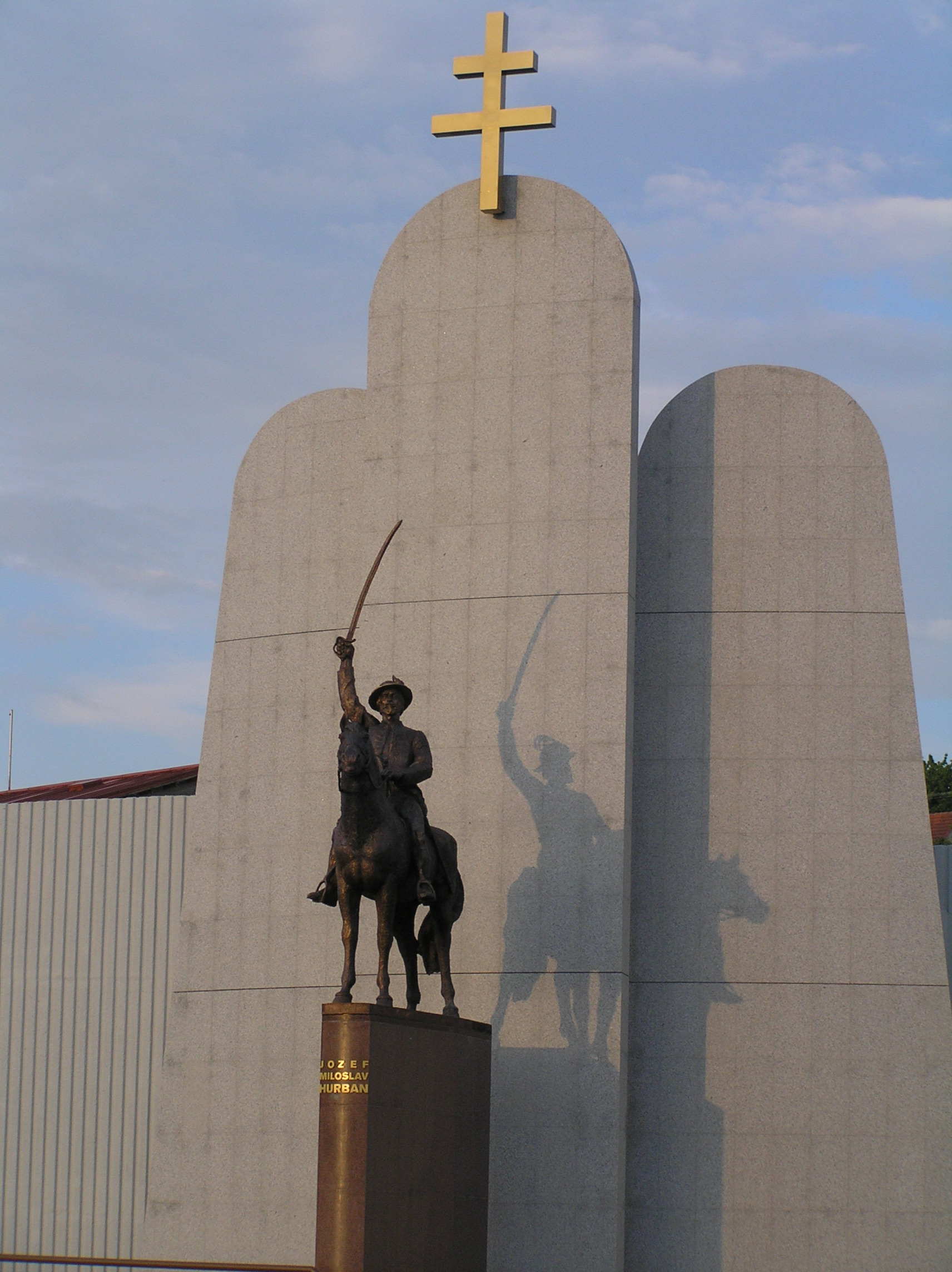
Hurban's memorial in Žilina

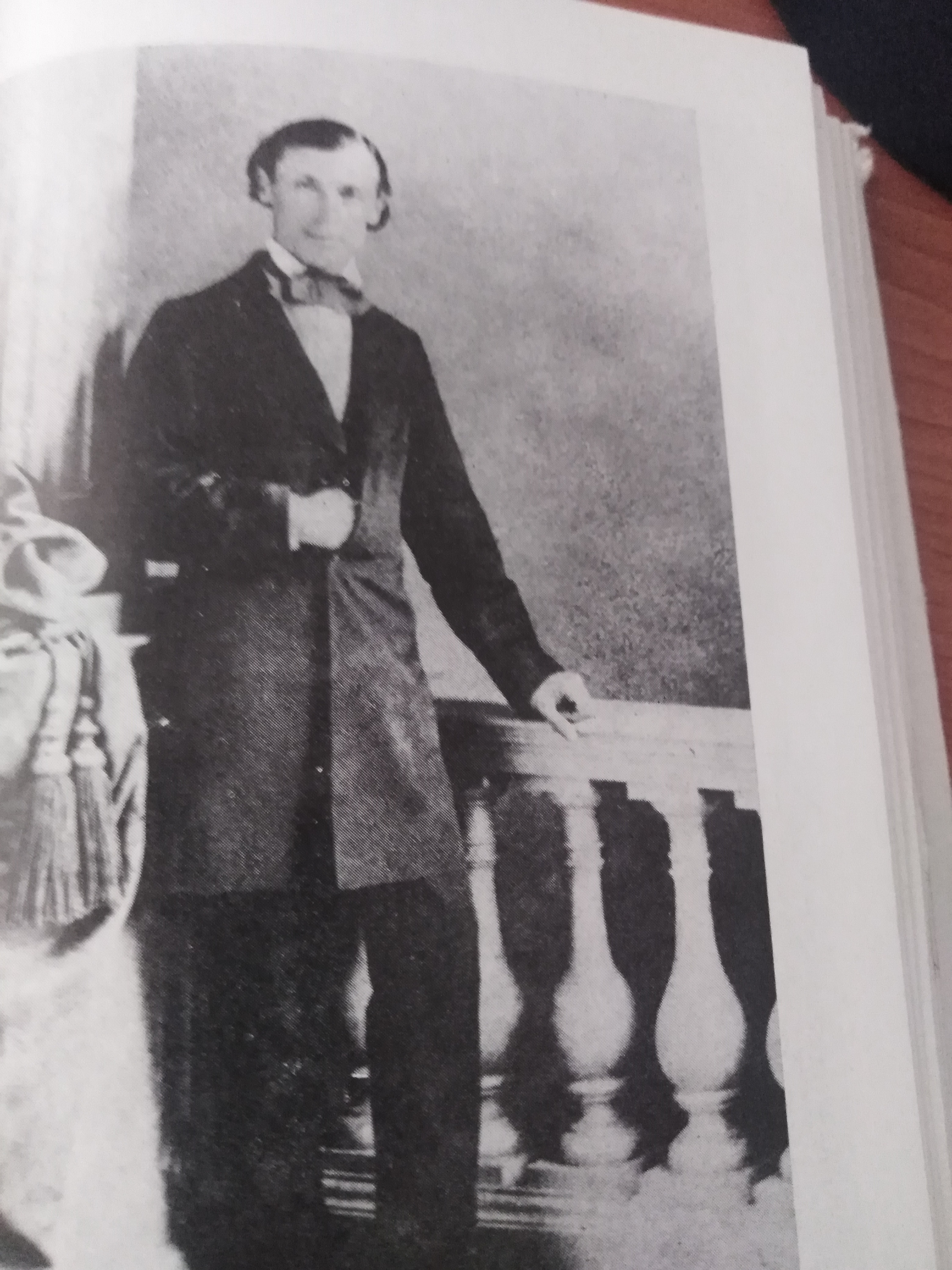
Young Hurban in a book by Vladimír Mináč

Jozef Miloslav Hurban (Hungarian: Hurbán József Miloszláv; pseudonyms Slavomil F. Kořennatý, Ľudovít Pavlovič, M. z Bohuslavíc, M. Selovský, 19 March 1817 – 21 February 1888) was a leader of the Slovak National Council and the Slovak Uprising in 1848–1849. He was a writer, journalist, politician, organizer of Slovak cultural life, and a Lutheran pastor. He was a supporter of Ján Kollár, and later of Ľudovít Štúr. His son, Svetozár Hurban-Vajanský, followed in his footsteps both as a writer and nationalist.

He is a co-founder of the Slovak National Council, Slovak Matica, group Tatrín, co-founder of the Slovak National Theater in Nitra.

The city of Hurbanovo in southern Slovakia and asteroid 3730 Hurban are both named after him.

== Early life ==
Hurban was born in Beckó, Kingdom of Hungary, Austrian Empire (now Beckov, Slovakia). He was born to a Lutheran priest, Paul Hurban, and his wife Anna, née Vörös, and was baptized as Jozef. He had an elder sister, Teresa Susan. He attended the town school in Trencsén, followed by the Evangelical Lyceum in Pressburg from 1830 to 1840. There, he met Ľudovít Štúr, who helped awaken patriotic sentiments in him. He was ordained a priest in 1840. He intended to continue his studies in Germany, but for financial reasons, he had to work until he could finally afford further study. After ordination, he served as a Lutheran chaplain in Berezó, and from 1843 served as a priest in Luboka. In 1860 he completed further education and earned his PhDr. and ThDr. h. c. (Doctor of Theology) titles. Subsequently, from 1866 on, he was assigned responsibilities as a superintendent of the Slovak Evangelical Church. He married Anna Jurkovičová, with whom he had four daughters and five sons (among them was the writer Svetozár Hurban-Vajanský).

== Career ==
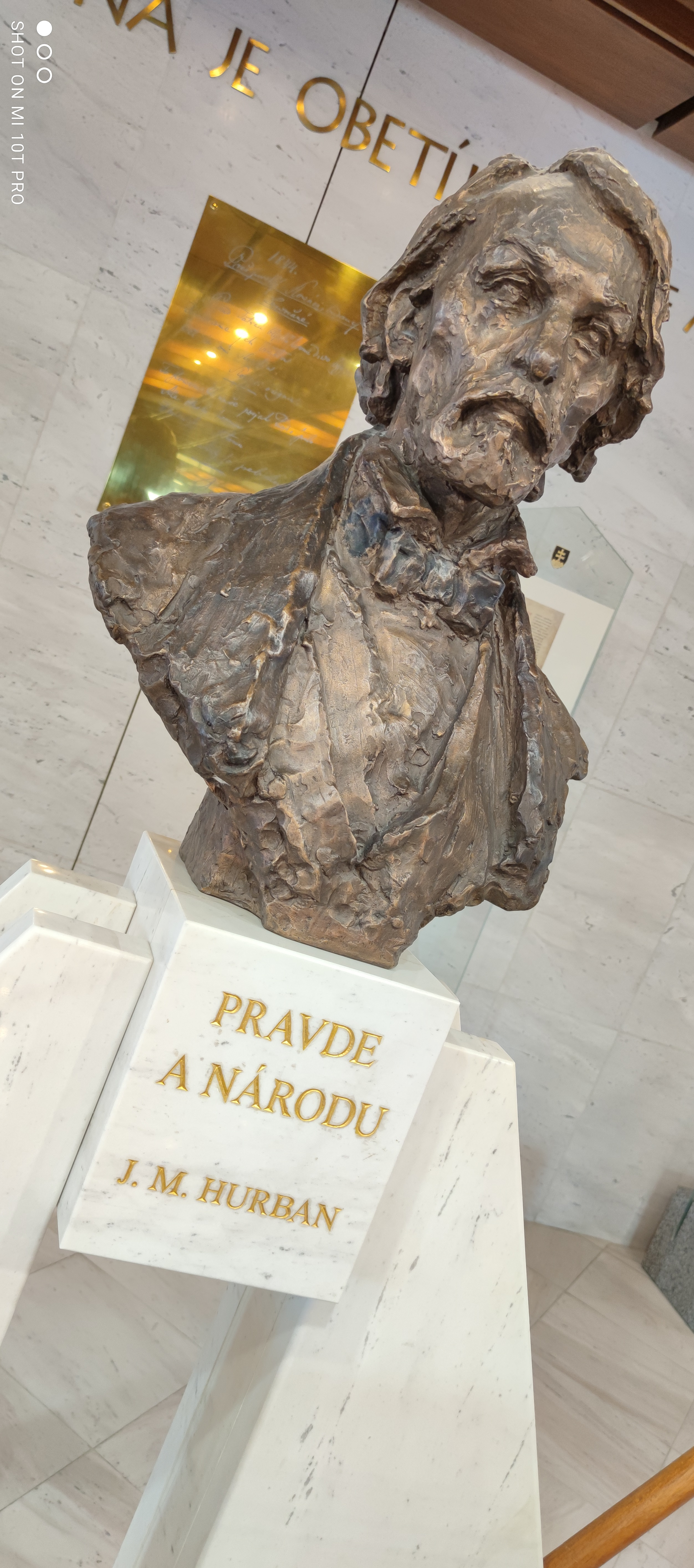
Bust of Jozef Miloslav Hurban

Jozef Miloslav Hurban headed and deeply influenced Slovak literature and public life for close to half a century. He was an uncompromising fighter for the national rights of the Slovak people, an implacable opponent of the Hungarian ruling class, and a pioneer of Slavic mutuality. During his youth, he was part of the Slovak radical opposition movement against feudalism. He worked against the domination of multiple aristocratic layers in Hungary, which were considered parasitic during the period.

For his uncompromising actions, he was by some called a traitor and communist agitator. Nevertheless, he laid the foundations for Slovak literary historiography. He co-founded the Slovak Theater in Nitra along with the nationalist Tatrína. Hurban became a renowned poet, publisher of literary almanacs, as well as publisher and editor of religious magazines. His work is multifaceted, national-defensive, folklore, literary-historical, critical, educational, and journalistic.

== Philosophical views ==
According to Rudolf Dupkala and Lukáš Perný Hurban's philosophical views developed from the inspiration of Fichte, through the period of Hegelianism to the period of Polish messianism and Schelling. Hurban concluded the Hegelian interpretation of history with an analysis and interpretation of the objectification of the spirit in the historical development of the Slavs and Slovaks with an emphasis on the manifestation of the spirit in their science, religion and literature. Philosophically interesting in this context is Hurban's idea of the manifestation of the spirit in Slavic science, which is - among other things - also a typical example of his theistic reflection of Hegel's philosophy.
