= Mr. Spielberg =

Single by Julian Le Play

from the album Soweit Sonar
- Released: 20 April 2012
- Recorded: 2011
- Genre: Pop
- Length: 3:51
- Label: GRIDmusic
- Songwriter(s): Julian Heidrich; Lukas Hillebrand; Lackner; Pohn; Schoesnba
- Producer(s): Lukas Hillebrand

Julian Le Play singles chronology
"Australian Gate" (2010)	"Mr. Spielberg" (2012)	"4 gewinnt" (2012)

"Mr. Spielberg" is a German-language song performed by Austrian singer-songwriter and radio presenter Julian Le Play. The song was released as a digital download on 20 April 2012. The song reached number 29 on the Austrian Singles Chart. The song is included on his debut studio album Soweit Sonar (2012).

== Music video ==
A music video to accompany the release of "Mr. Spielberg" was first released onto YouTube on 23 April 2012 at a total length of six minutes and fifty-five seconds.

== Track listing ==
Digital download
No.	Title	Length
1.	"Mr. Spielberg"	3:51

== Chart performance ==
Chart (2012)	Peak position
Austria (Ö3 Austria Top 40)	29

== Release history ==
Region	Date	Format	Label
Austria	20 April 2012	Digital download	GRIDmusic
