= 1920 in Czechoslovakia =

- Decades: 1910s; 1920s; 1930s; 1940s
- See also: Other events of 1920; History of Czechoslovakia; Years in Czechoslovakia

Events from the year 1920 in Czechoslovakia. The year saw the state adopt a new constitution and hold its first parliamentary elections.

== Incumbents ==
- President: Tomáš Masaryk.
- Prime Minister:
  - Vlastimil Tusar (until 15 September).
  - Jan Černý (from 15 September).

== Events ==
- 29 February – A new constitution is adopted with the president elected by a National Assembly. The constitution also rules that the country been known as Czechoslovakia, ending the hyphen war.
- 18 April – Elections are held for the Chamber of Deputies of the National Assembly.
- 23 April – The Czechoslovak team participates for the first time in the Summer Olympics.
- 25 April – Elections are held for the Senate.
- 29 April – The Czechoslovak ice hockey team wins the first Olympic bronze medal, in ice hockey.
- 27 May – Tomáš Masaryk is re-elected president.
- 4 June – The Treaty of Trianon is signed, confirming that Carpathian Ruthenia is part of Czechoslovakia.
- 28 July – Czechoslovakia and Poland agree their border around Český Těšín.
- 14 August – An alliance is signed between Czechoslovakia and Yugoslavia.

== Popular culture ==
=== Film ===
- Gilly in Prague for the First Time (Gilly poprvé v Praze), directed by Karel Lamač, is released.
- For the Freedom of the Nation (Za svobodu národa), directed by Václav Binovec, is released.

=== Music ===
- Bohuslav Martinů composes Three Slovak Songs.
- Leoš Janáček's Káťa Kabanová and The Excursions of Mr. Brouček to the Moon and to the 15th Century are first performed.
- The Prague Quartet is founded.

== Births ==
- 5 April Aniela Kupiec, Polish poet born in Cieszyn Silesia (died 2019).
- 23 August – Wanda Jablonski, investigative reporter of the petroleum industry (died 1992).
- 12 September – Lore Schirmer, Kabarett artist and standup comedian (died 1994).
- 3 November – Herta Lindner, member of the German resistance to Nazism (died 1943).
- 21 December – Olga Šilhánová, gymnast, gold medal winner at the 1948 Summer Olympics (died 1986).

== Deaths ==
- 1 May – Hanuš Wihan, cellist (born 1855).
- 6 December – Karel Kovařovic, composer and conductor (born 1862).
