= Wir haben noch das ganze Leben =

Single by Julian Le Play

from the album Melodrom
- Released: November 2014
- Recorded: 2012/13
- Genre: Pop
- Length: 4:57
- Label: GRIDmusic
- Songwriter(s): Julian Heidrich
- Producer(s): Lukas Hillebrand; Alex Pohn

Julian Le Play singles chronology
""Rollercoaster"" (2014)	"Wir haben noch das ganze Leben" (2014)	"Hand in Hand" (2016)

"Wir haben noch das ganze Leben" is a song performed by Austrian singer-songwriter and radio presenter Julian Le Play. The song was released as a digital download in November 2014 as the fourth and final single from his second studio album Melodrom (2014). The song has peaked at number 35 on the Austrian Singles Chart.

== Music video ==
A music video to accompany the release of "Wir haben noch das ganze Leben" was first released onto YouTube on 21 January 2015 at a total length of five minutes and eighteen seconds.

== Track listing ==
Digital download
No.	Title	Length
1.	"Wir haben noch das ganze Leben"	4:57

== Chart performance ==
Chart (2014/15)	Peak position
Austria (Ö3 Austria Top 40)	35

== Release history ==
Region	Date	Format	Label
Austria	November 2014	Digital download	GRIDmusic
