= Julian Le Play =

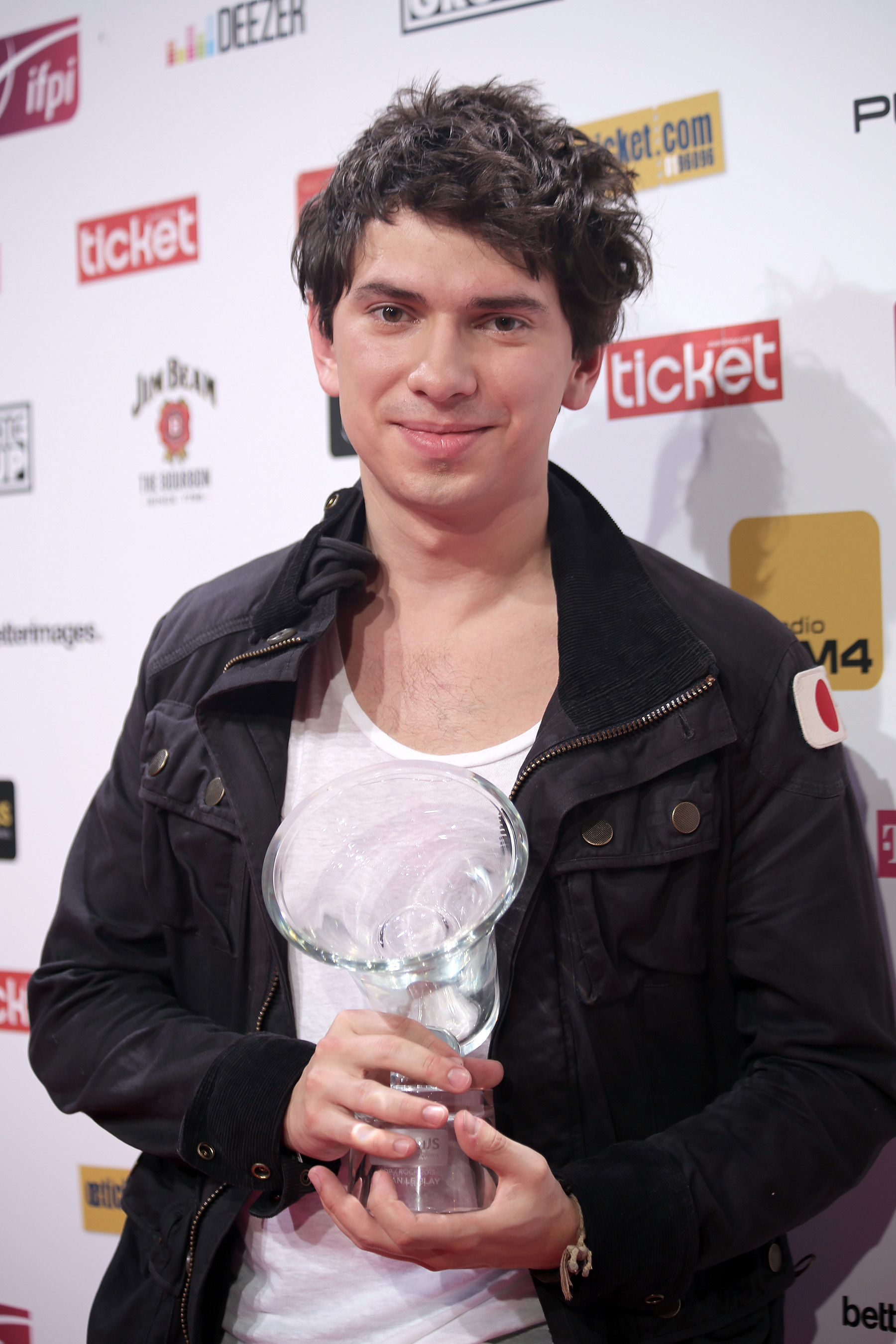
- Julian le Play, 2013

Background information
- Birth name: Julian Heidrich
- Born: 27 June 1991 (age 33); Vienna, Austria
- Origin: Austria
- Genres: Pop
- Occupation: Singer-songwriter
- Years active: 2003–present

Julian Heidrich (born 27 June 1991), better known as simply Julian Le Play, is an Austrian singer-songwriter and radio presenter. He is best known for his 2014 single "Mein Anker" peaking at number 6 on the Austrian Singles Chart. So far he has released three studio albums, Soweit Sonar in 2012, Melodrom in 2014 and Zugvögel in 2016.

== Career ==
=== 2010–12: Soweit Sonar ===
On 3 December 2010 he released his debut single "Australian Gate" under his birth name Julian Heidrich. The song peaked at number 26 on the Austrian Singles Chart. On 20 April 2012 he released the singles "Mr. Spielberg" and "4 gewinnt" under the name Julian Le Play. "Mr. Spielberg" peaked at number 29 on the Austrian Singles Chart. On 14 September 2012 he released the single "Philosoph". The song peaked at number 26 on the Austrian Singles Chart. He released his debut studio album Soweit Sonar on 28 September 2012, peaking to number 5 on the Austrian Albums Chart. "Land in Sicht" was released as the fourth single from the album.

=== 2013–14: Melodrom ===
On 26 April 2013 he released "Der Wolf" as the lead single from his second studio album. The song peaked at number 47 on the Austrian Singles Chart. On 31 January 2014 he released "Mein Anker" as the second single from the album. The song peaked at number 6 on the Austrian Singles Chart. He released his second studio album Melodrom on 28 February 2014. The album peaked at number 3 on the Austrian Albums Chart. On 4 July 2014 he released "Rollercoaster" as the third single from the album. The song peaked at number 17 on the Austrian Singles Chart. "Wir haben noch das ganze Leben" was released as the fourth single from the album in November 2014, peaking to number 35 on the Austrian Singles Chart.

=== 2016–present: Zugvögel ===
On 18 March 2016 he released "Hand in Hand" as the lead single from his third studio album, peaking to number 14 on the Austrian Singles Chart. He will release his third studio album Zugvögel on 15 April 2016.

== Discography ==
=== Albums ===
Title	Details	Peak chart positions	
Title	Details	AUT	GER
Soweit Sonar	Released: 28 September 2012; Format: CD, digital download; Label: Gridmusic	5	—
Melodrom	Released: 28 February 2014; Format: CD, digital download; Label: Gridmusic	3	—
Zugvögel	Released: 15 April 2016; Format: CD, digital download; Label: Polydor Records	3	29
Tandem	Released: 7 August 2020; Format: CD, digital download; Label: Polydor Records	1	—
"—" denotes an album that did not chart or was not released in that territory.

=== Singles ===
Year	Title	Peak chart positions	Album
Year	Title	AUT	Album
2010	"Australian Gate"	26	Non-album single
2012	"Mr. Spielberg"	29	Soweit Sonar
2012	"4 gewinnt"	—	Soweit Sonar
2012	"Philosoph"	26	Soweit Sonar
2012	"Land in Sicht"	—	Soweit Sonar
2013	"Der Wolf"	47	Melodrom
2014	"Mein Anker"	6	Melodrom
2014	"Rollercoaster"	17	Melodrom
2014	"Wir haben noch das ganze Leben"	35	Melodrom
2016	"Hand in Hand"	14	Zugvögel
"—" denotes a single that did not chart or was not released in that territory.
