= Rakša =

- Municipality
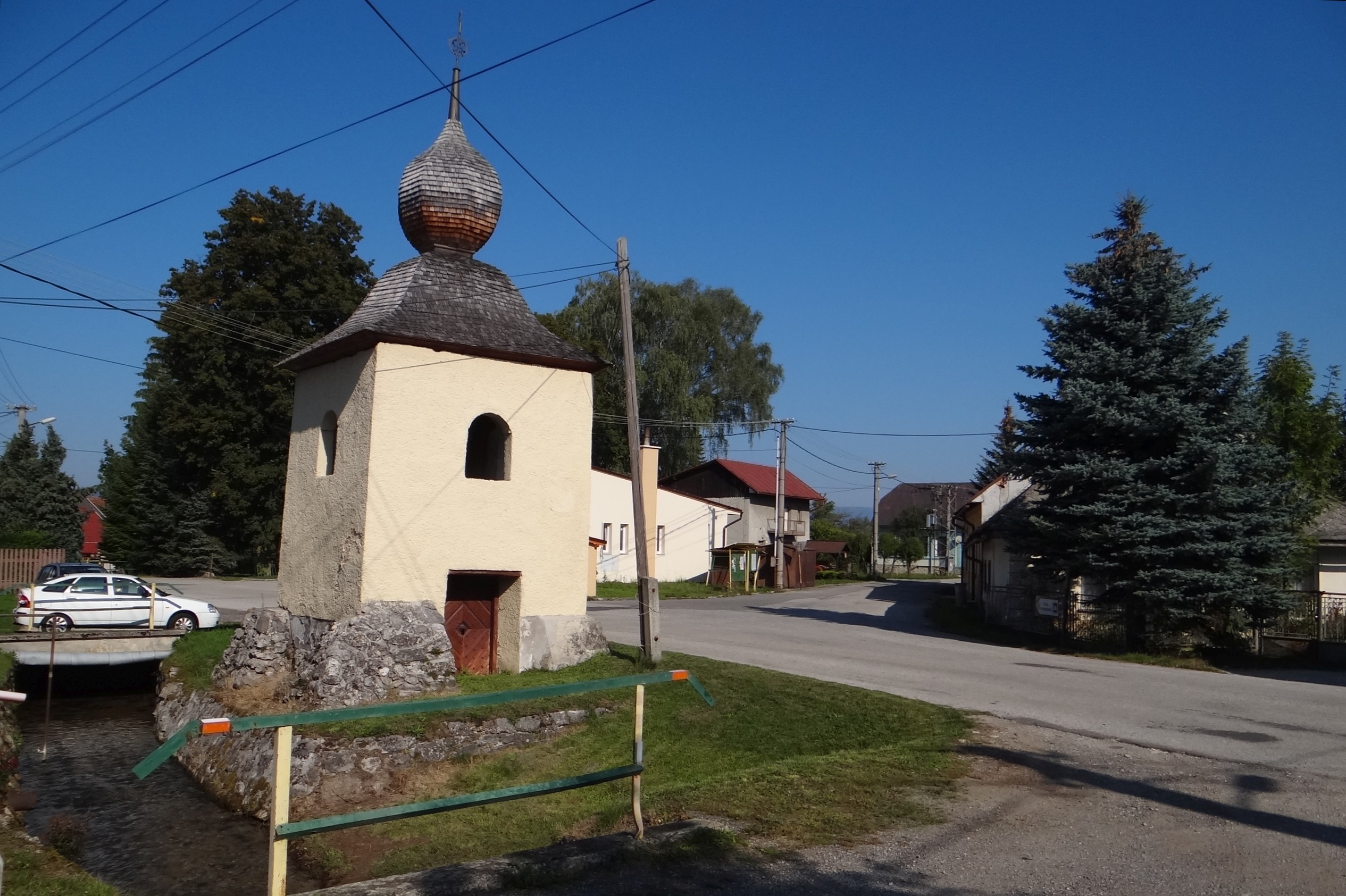

- Flag

- Location of Rakša in the Žilina Region Location of Rakša in Slovakia
- Coordinates: 48.88°N 18.88°E
- Country: Slovakia
- Region: Žilina Region
- District: Turčianske Teplice District
- First mentioned: 1277

Area
  - Total: 11.73 km^{2} (4.53 sq mi)
- Elevation: 502 m (1,647 ft)

Population (2025)
  - Total: 225
- Time zone: UTC+1 (CET)
  - Summer (DST): UTC+2 (CEST)
- Postal code: 390 1
- Area code: +421 43
- Vehicle registration plate (until 2022): RK
- Website: www.raksa.sk

Rakša (Hungarian: Kisraksa) is a village and municipality in Turčianske Teplice District in the Žilina Region of northern central Slovakia.

== History ==
In historical records the village was first mentioned in 1277. Before the establishment of independent Czechoslovakia in 1918, it was part of Turóc County within the Kingdom of Hungary. From 1939 to 1945, it was part of the Slovak Republic.

== Famous Residents ==
Michal Miloslav Hodža, the famous Slovak national revivalist, priest, poet and linguist was born on 22 September 1811 in Rakša.

== Geography ==
The municipality lies at an altitude of 502 metres (1,647 ft) and covers an area of 11.73 km^{2} (4.53 sq mi) (2025).

== Population ==
Population statistic (10 years)
Year	1995	2005	2015	2025
Count	198	222	219	225
Difference		+12.12%	−1.35%	+2.73%

Population statistic
Year	2024	2025
Count	219	225
Difference		+2.73%

It has a population of 225 people (31 December 2025).

=== Ethnicity ===
Census 2021 (1+ %)
Ethnicity	Number	Fraction
Slovak	218	99.54%
Other	3	1.36%
Total	219	

In year 2021 was 219 people by ethnicity 218 as Slovak, 3 as Other, 2 as Not found out, 1 as Ukrainian and 1 as German.

Note on population: The difference values of population numbers in the table "Population statistic" and in the sections "Ethnicity" & "Religion" is caused by the use of various statistical methods.

=== Religion ===
Census 2021 (1+ %)
Religion	Number	Fraction
Roman Catholic Church	76	34.7%
None	67	30.59%
Evangelical Church	62	28.31%
Not found out	10	4.57%
Total	219	

In year 2021 was 219 people by religion 76 from Roman Catholic Church, 67 from None, 62 from Evangelical Church, 10 from Not found out, 2 from Other, 1 from Greek Catholic Church and 1 from Ad hoc movements.
