= Hlboké =

- Municipality
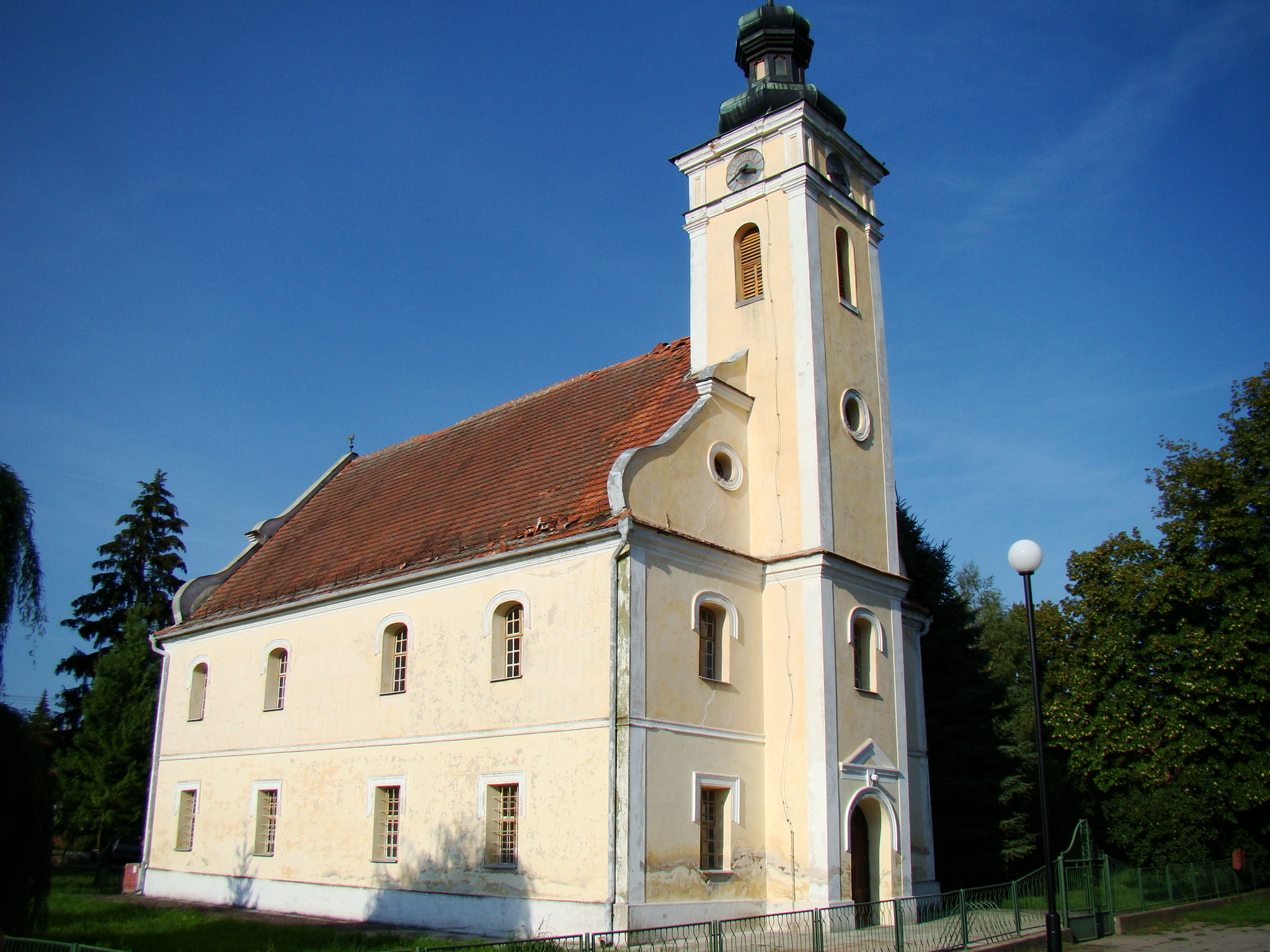

- Flag

- Location of Hlboké in the Trnava Region Location of Hlboké in Slovakia
- Coordinates: 48.66°N 17.41°E
- Country: Slovakia
- Region: Trnava Region
- District: Senica District
- First mentioned: 1262

Area
  - Total: 20.22 km^{2} (7.81 sq mi)
- Elevation: 256 m (840 ft)

Population (2025)
  - Total: 1,069
- Time zone: UTC+1 (CET)
  - Summer (DST): UTC+2 (CEST)
- Postal code: 906 31
- Area code: +421 34
- Vehicle registration plate (until 2022): SE
- Website: www.obechlboke.sk

Hlboké (Hungarian: Luboka) is a village and municipality in Senica District in the Trnava Region of western Slovakia.

== History ==
In historical records the village was first mentioned in 1262. In July 1843, Ľudovít Štúr, Jozef Miloslav Hurban and Michal Miloslav Hodža met at the Lutheran parish house in Hlboké and agreed to codify standard Slovak based on the Central Slovak dialect. Before the establishment of independent Czechoslovakia in 1918, Hlboké was part of Nyitra County within the Kingdom of Hungary. From 1939 to 1945, it was part of the Slovak Republic.

== Geography ==
The municipality lies at an altitude of 256 metres (840 ft) and covers an area of 20.22 km^{2} (7.81 sq mi) (2025). The village is at 48°39′30″N 17°24′25″E.

== Population ==
Population statistic (10 years)
Year	1995	2005	2015	2025
Count	864	918	941	1069
Difference		+6.25%	+2.50%	+13.60%

Population statistic
Year	2024	2025
Count	1066	1069
Difference		+0.28%

It has a population of 1069 people (31 December 2025).

=== Ethnicity ===
Census 2021 (1+%)
Ethnicity	Number	Fraction
Slovak	922	94.08%
Not found out	51	5.2%
Total	980	

In year 2021 was 980 people by ethnicity 922 as Slovak, 51 as Not found out, 8 as Czech, 7 as German, 5 as Other, 2 as Ukrainian, 2 as Romani, 1 as Jewish, 1 as Russian and 1 as Austrian.

Note on population: The difference values of population numbers in the table "Population statistic" and in the sections "Ethnicity" & "Religion" is caused by the use of various statistical methods.

=== Religion ===
Census 2021 (1+%)
Religion	Number	Fraction
None	435	44.39%
Evangelical Church	305	31.12%
Roman Catholic Church	164	16.73%
Not found out	50	5.1%
Total	980	

In year 2021 was 980 people by religion 435 from None, 305 from Evangelical Church, 164 from Roman Catholic Church, 50 from Not found out, 9 from Greek Catholic Church, 7 from Ad hoc movements, 4 from United Methodist Church, 2 from Paganism and natural spirituality, 1 from Jewish community, 1 from Other and not ascertained christian church, 1 from Other and 1 from Buddhism.

== Notable people ==
- Jozef Miloslav Hurban, Slovak politician
- Svetozár Hurban-Vajanský, Slovak writer

== Genealogical resources ==
The records for genealogical research are available at the state archive "Statny Archiv in Bratislava, Slovakia"

- Roman Catholic church records (births/marriages/deaths): 1692-1895 (parish B)
- Lutheran church records (births/marriages/deaths): 1733-1896 (parish A)

== Gallery ==
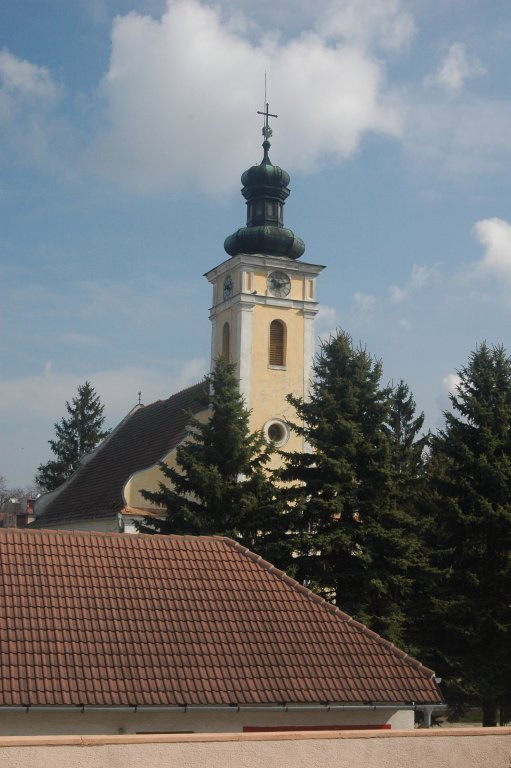
1787 Lutheran Church Building

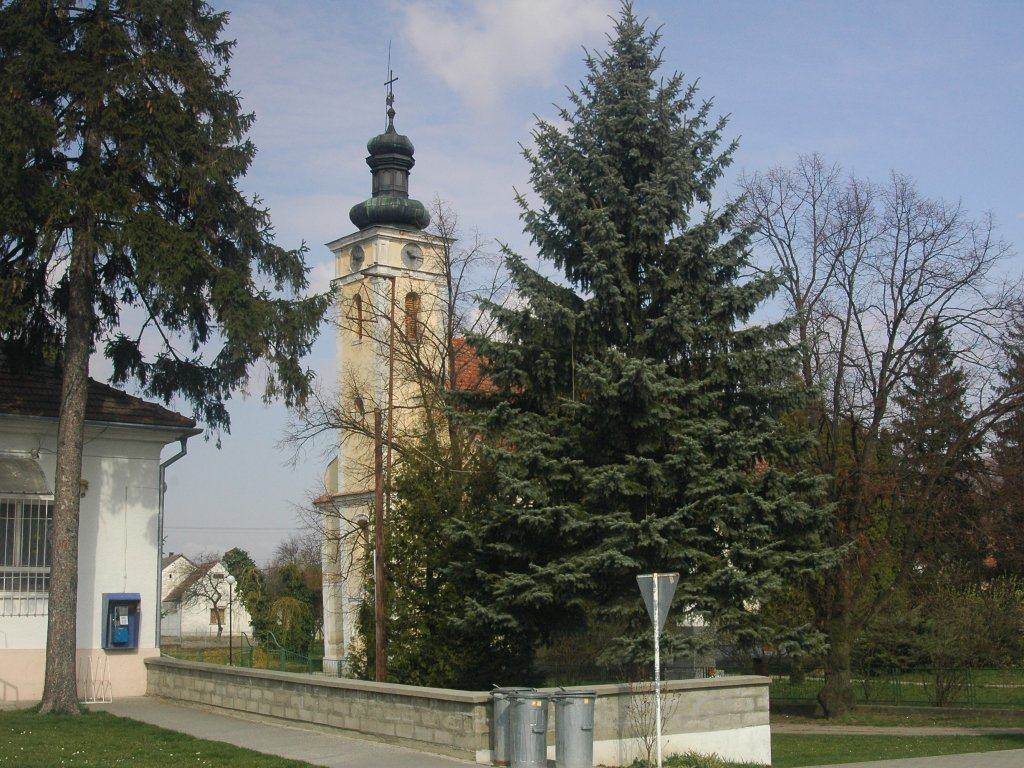
Hlboké

== See also ==
- List of municipalities and towns in Slovakia
