= Australian Gate =

Single by Julian Heidrich
- Released: 3 December 2010
- Recorded: 2010
- Genre: Pop
- Length: 3:20
- Label: Sony Music Entertainment Austria

Julian Heidrich singles chronology
"Australian Gate" (2010)	"Mr. Spielberg" (2012)

"Australian Gate" is an English-language song performed by Austrian singer-songwriter and radio presenter Julian Heidrich. The song was released as a digital download on 3 December 2010. The song peaked at number 26 on the Austrian Singles Chart.

== Track listing ==
Digital download
No.	Title	Length
1.	"Australian Gate"	3:20

== Chart performance ==
Chart (2010)	Peak position
Austria (Ö3 Austria Top 40)	26

== Release history ==
Region	Date	Format	Label
Austria	3 December 2010	Digital download	Sony Music Entertainment Austria
