= Svetozár Hurban-Vajanský =

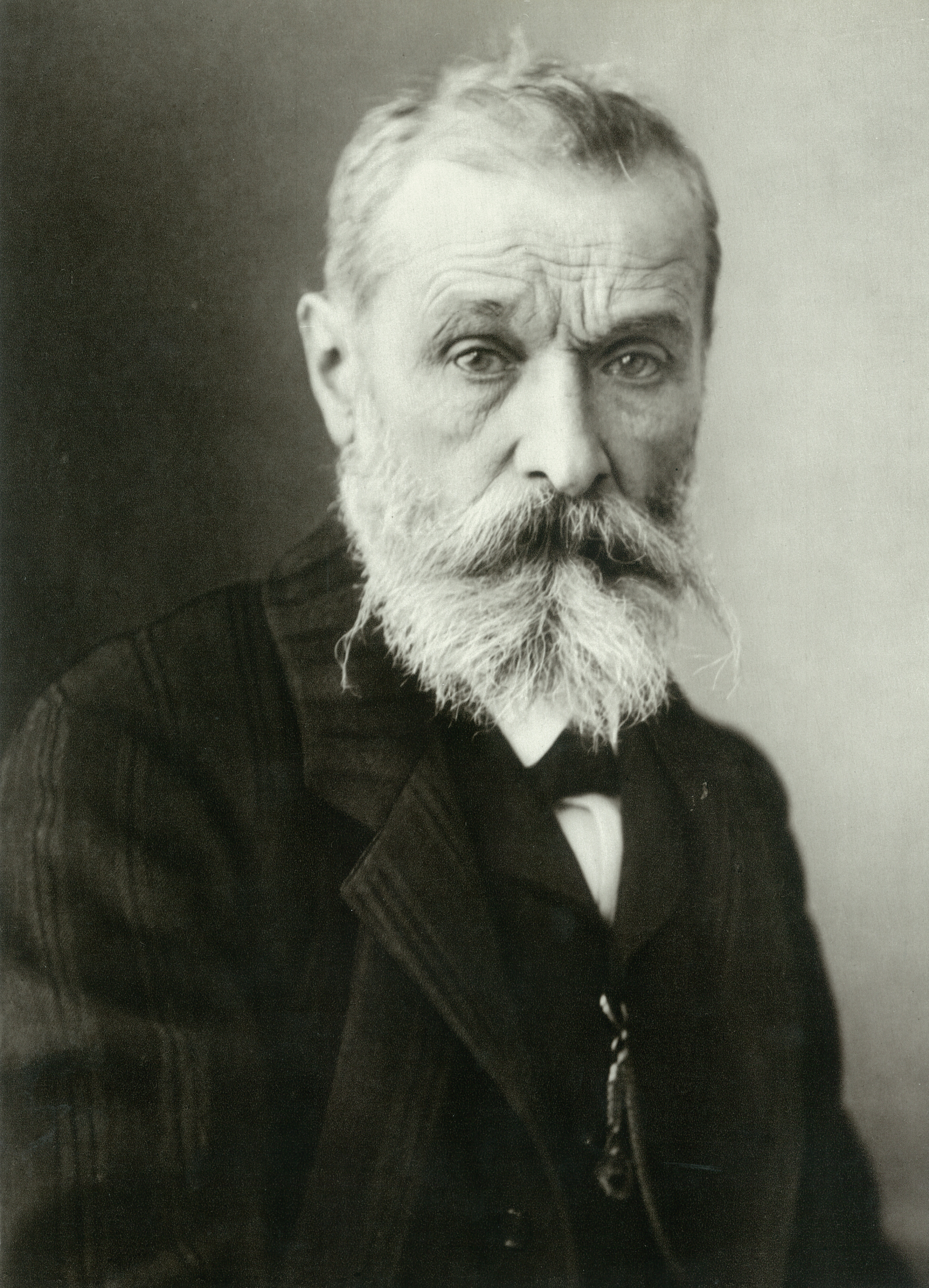
Svetozár Hurban-Vajanský

Svetozár Miloslav Hurban (16 January 1847 – 17 August 1916), pen name Svetozár Hurban-Vajanský, was a Slovak poet, lawyer and nationalist newspaper editor who was twice imprisoned. Born in Hlboké, he was the son of Jozef Miloslav Hurban.

He died in Martin, Slovakia.
