= Hand in Hand (Julian Le Play song) =

Single by Julian Le Play

from the album Zugvögel
- Released: 18 March 2016
- Recorded: 2015
- Genre: Pop
- Length: 3:28
- Label: Troubadour
- Songwriter(s): Julian Heidrich; Jonathan Reiner

Julian Le Play singles chronology
"Wir haben noch das ganze Leben" (2014)	"Hand in Hand" (2016)

"Hand in Hand" is a song performed by Austrian singer-songwriter and radio presenter Julian Le Play. The song was released as a digital download on 18 March 2016 as the lead single from his third studio album Zugvögel (2016). The song peaked at number 14 on the Austrian Singles Chart.

== Music video ==
A music video to accompany the release of "Hand in Hand" was first released onto YouTube on 18 March 2016 at a total length of three minutes and thirty-two seconds.

== Track listing ==
Digital download
No.	Title	Length
1.	"Hand in Hand"	3:28

== Chart performance ==
Chart (2016)	Peak position
Austria (Ö3 Austria Top 40)	14

== Release history ==
Region	Date	Format	Label
Austria	18 March 2016	Digital download	GRIDmusic
