= Phú An, Ho Chi Minh City =

Phú An Phường Phú An Tân An, Phú Thuận, Phú Thứ, An Thuận
- Ward
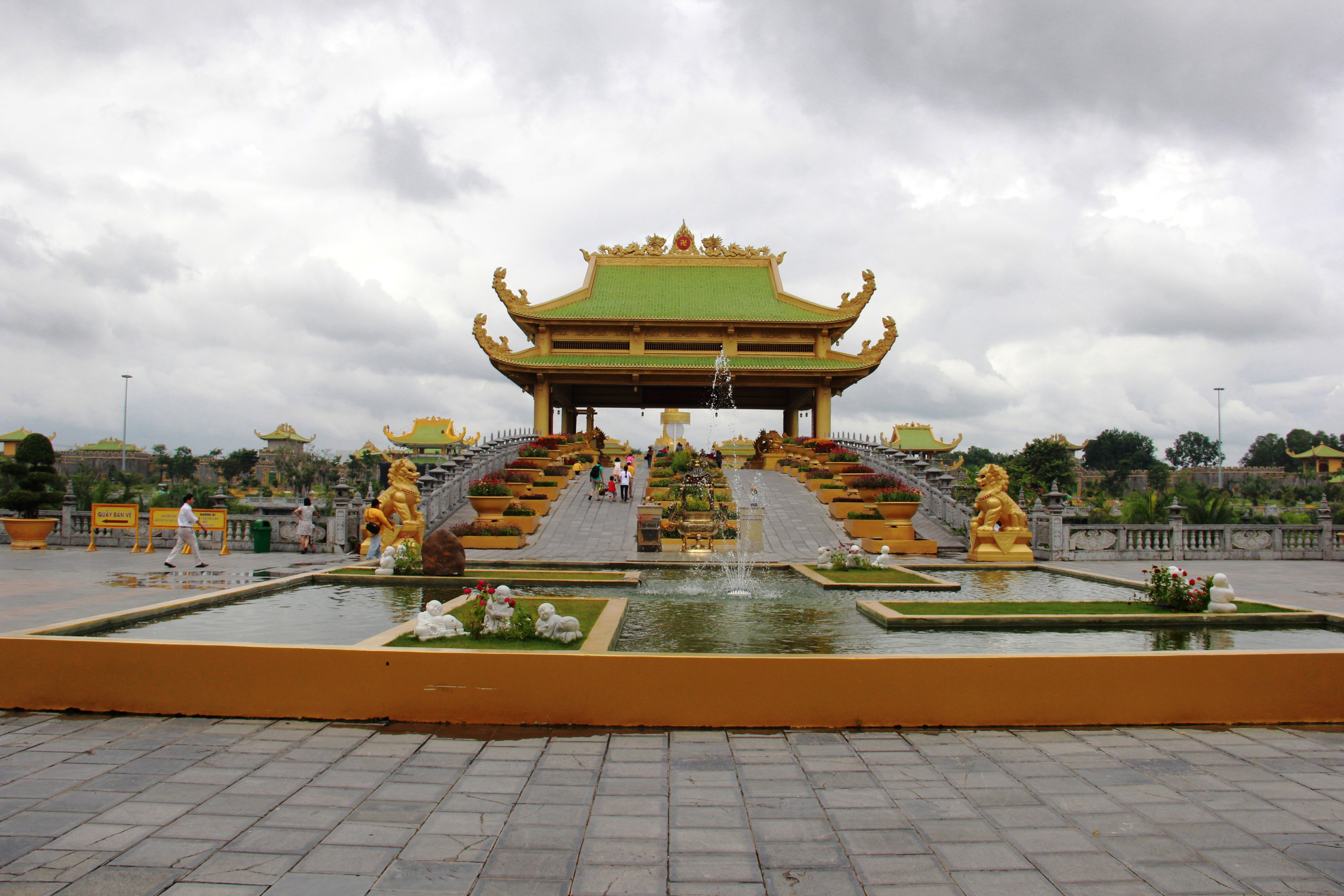
- Đại Nam Theme Park
- Interactive map of Phú An
- Coordinates: 11°03′30″N 106°35′43″E
- Country: Vietnam
- Municipality: Ho Chi Minh City
- Established: June 16, 2025

Area
  - Total: 13.50 sq mi (34.97 km^{2})

Population (2024)
  - Total: 46,142
  - Density: 3,417/sq mi (1,319/km^{2})
- Time zone: UTC+07:00 (Indochina Time)
- Administrative code: 25768

Phú An (Vietnamese: Phường Phú An) is a ward of Ho Chi Minh City, Vietnam. It is one of the 168 new wards, communes and special zones of the city following the reorganization in 2025.

== History ==
On June 16, 2025, the National Assembly Standing Committee issued Resolution No. 1685/NQ-UBTVQH15 on the arrangement of commune-level administrative units of Ho Chi Minh City in 2025 (effective from June 16, 2025). Accordingly, the entire land area and population of Tân An ward and part of Hiệp An ward of the former Thủ Dầu Một city, the entire land area and population of Phú An commune of the former Bến Cát city will be integrated into a new ward named Phú An (Clause 92, Article 1).

== Notable people ==
- Nguyễn Minh Triết, former President of Vietnam
