= Đại Nam Văn Hiến =

Tourism complex in Bình Dương Province, Vietnam

Lạc Cảnh Đại Nam Văn Hiến
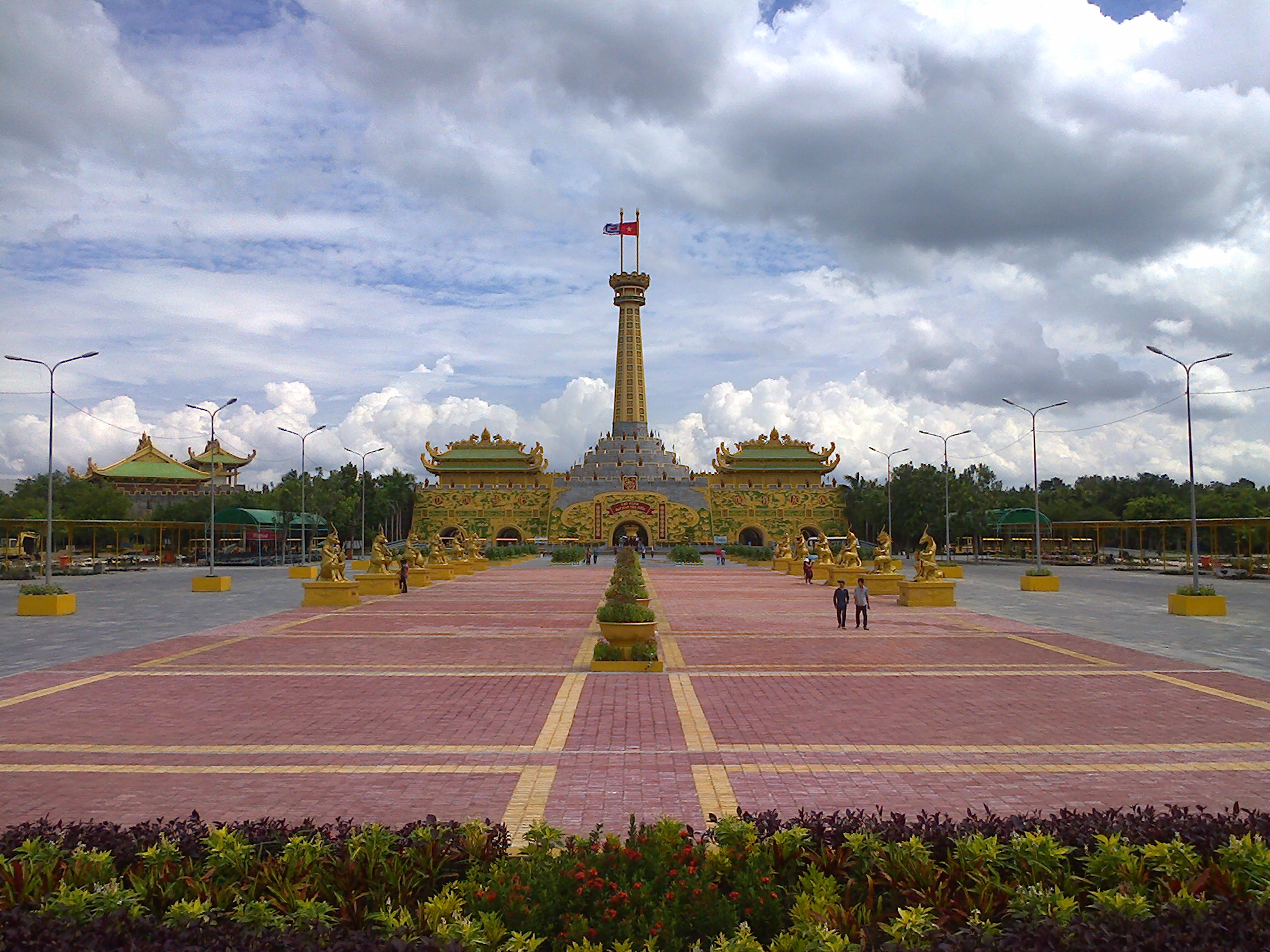
- Main square of the complex
- Interactive map of Lạc Cảnh Đại Nam Văn Hiến
- Location: Phú An, Ho Chi Minh City, Vietnam
- Coordinates: 11°2′36″N 106°37′57″E
- Status: Operating
- Opened: September 11, 2008; 17 years ago
- Owner: Dai Nam Joint Stock Corporation
- General manager: Nguyễn Phương Hằng (as of 2024)
- Area: 450 ha (1,100 acres)

Attractions
- Total: 20+
- Water rides: Several, including wave pool
- Website: Official website

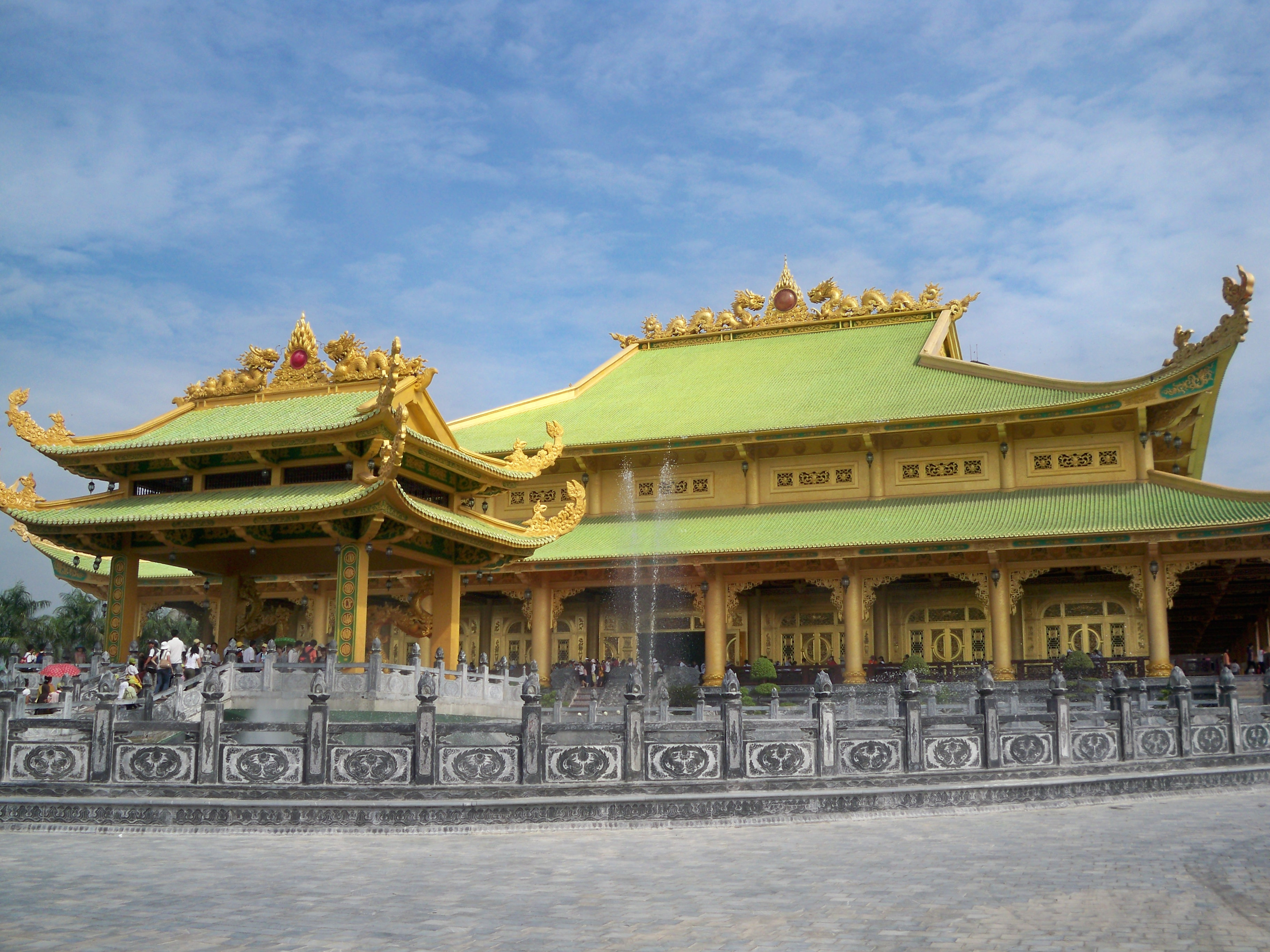
Đại Nam Văn Hiến

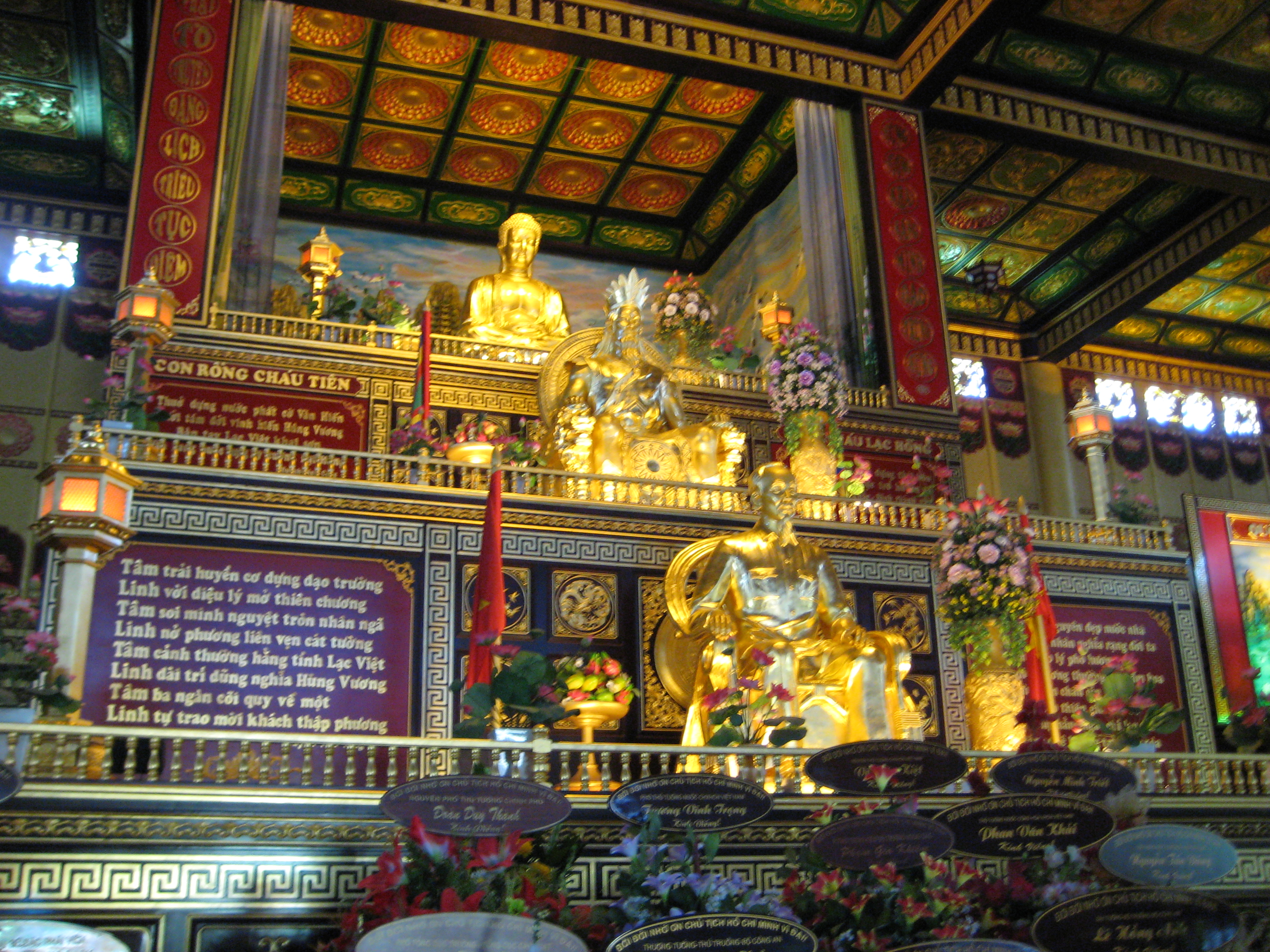
Main worship place in Đại Nam Quốc Tự, with Buddha Amitābha, Hùng Vương, and Hồ Chí Minh

Lạc Cảnh Đại Nam Văn Hiến is an amusement park, a large tourism and entertainment complex in Hiệp An, Thủ Dầu Một, Bình Dương province (now is Phú An, Ho Chi Minh City), Vietnam, approximately 40 kilometers north of Ho Chi Minh City. Opened on September 11, 2008, by entrepreneurs Huỳnh Uy Dũng and Nguyễn Phương Hằng, the complex spans 450 hectares (1,100 acres) and combines cultural, historical, religious, and recreational elements. It features Vietnam's first open safari zoo, the largest artificial sea in the country, temples, man-made mountains, amusement rides, hotels, and shopping areas. The site aims to preserve and promote Vietnamese cultural heritage, with an estimated construction cost of around 6,000 billion VND (approximately US$219 million at the time).

== History ==
Construction began in the late 1990s on a 450-hectare plot, with the goal of creating a multifaceted destination honoring Vietnamese history and culture. The project was spearheaded by Huỳnh Uy Dũng, a prominent businessman known for industrial developments, and his wife Nguyễn Phương Hằng. It opened to the public in 2008, quickly gaining recognition for records such as the largest man-made mountain and artificial sea in Vietnam. In 2014, the complex faced a temporary suspension of operations due to a land dispute with Bình Dương provincial authorities over 61.4 hectares of land use rights. Huỳnh Uy Dũng announced a closure from November 10 to December 31, 2014, as a protest, demanding compensation of 1,800 billion VND. Financially, the operating company has reported losses in some years, attributed to high maintenance costs despite tourism revenue. In 2024, management saw changes with Nguyễn Phương Hằng returning as deputy chairwoman, first deputy general director, and executive general director of the tourism area, following her release from prison after serving a sentence for abuse of democratic freedoms.

== Attractions ==
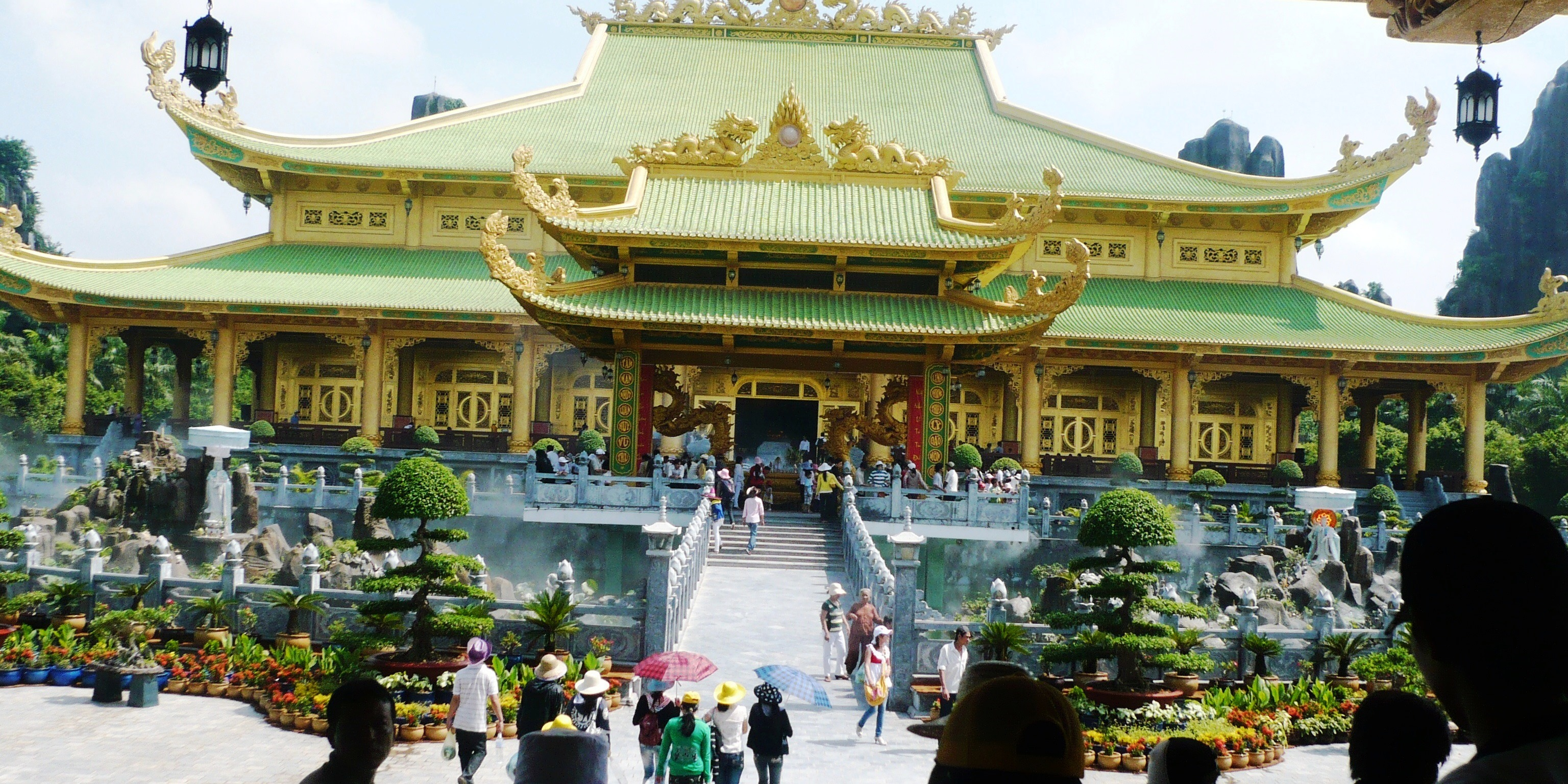
Kim Palace

=== Đại Nam Quốc Tự (Temple Area) ===
The centerpiece is a large gold-plated temple blending Vietnamese architecture with statues of historical figures like the Hùng Kings and national heroes.

=== Bảo Sơn Mountain Range ===
This man-made mountain range features peaks modeled after natural formations, with internal exhibits on Vietnamese history and culture.

=== Đại Nam Sea ===
A 21.6-hectare artificial sea with waves up to 1.6 meters high, designed by international experts, offering beach relaxation and water activities.

=== Zoo and Safari ===
The 12.5-hectare open zoo, Vietnam's first safari-style park, houses over 100 species, including rare animals like white lions, white tigers, rhinos, elephants, zebras, and giraffes. It operates daily until 9:00 PM.

=== Entertainment and Rides ===
Rides include a roller coaster reaching 75 km/h over 680 meters, F1 racing tracks, water slides, pirate ships, a 4D cinema with immersive effects, and paintball games. Other facilities include hotels, campgrounds, theaters, and dining areas.
