= Martin Declaration =

Treaty signed by Slovak politicians to form the country Czecho-Slovakia

Martin Declaratian
- Created: 30 October 1918
- Location: Turčiansky Svätý Martin
- Author: Slovak National Council
- Signatories: Karol Medvecký; Matúš Dula
- Purpose: To announce and explain separation of Slovakia from the Kingdom of Hungary and unification with the Czech lands

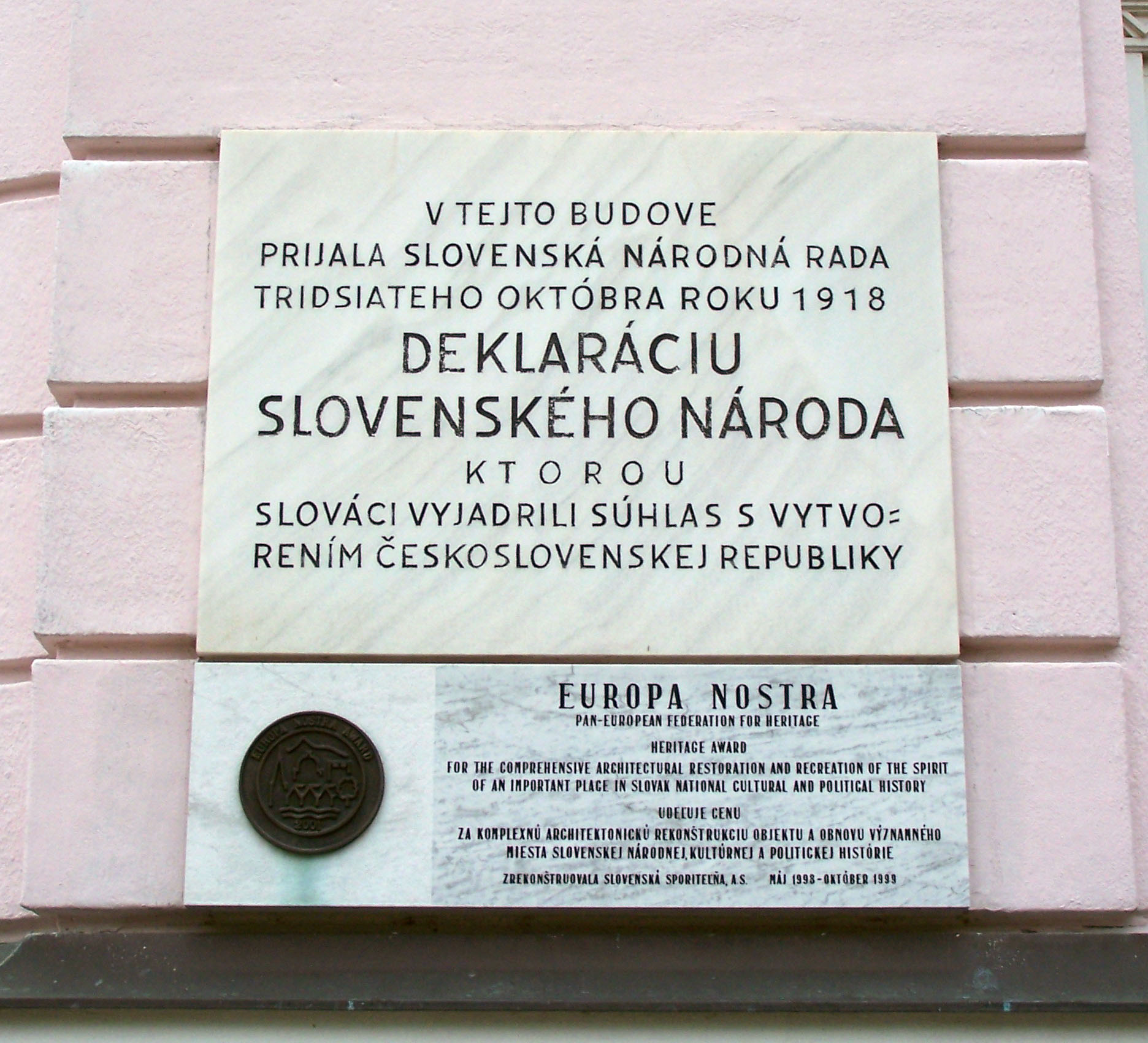
Memorial plaque to the Declaration of the Slovak Nation in Martin, Slovakia

The Martin Declaration (Slovak: Martinská deklarácia) is the name usually given to the Declaration of the Slovak Nation (Slovak: Deklarácia slovenského národa) that was proclaimed in the town of Turčiansky Svätý Martin (now Martin, Slovakia) on 30 October 1918. The declaration was effectively a declaration of independence from the Kingdom of Hungary (within the Austro-Hungarian Empire) and presaged Slovakia's unification with the Czech lands as part of the new state of Czechoslovakia.

Slovak separatist ambitions were largely suspended during World War I, when the leading Slovak nationalist party, the Slovak National Party (SNP), proclaimed its loyalty to the empire. The final months of the war saw a gradual disintegration of the empire, which led to the party deciding to resume its drive for a separate Slovak state. Its chairman, Matúš Dula, chose Martin, a centre for Slovak cultural and political life since the 19th century, as the venue for a general meeting of the party.

On the morning of 30 October 1918, 108 delegates attended the meeting in the Tatra Bank in Martin and elected a twelve-member Slovak National Council, drawn mainly from the Slovak National Party. In the afternoon, the newly-constituted council issued the declaration and sent it to Prague. The declaration announced: "The Slovak Nation is a part of the Czecho-Slovak Nation, united in language and in the history of its culture" and declared that only the Slovak National Council, not the Hungarian government or any other authority, was authorised to speak for the Slovak nation.

The declaration came two days after the declaration of Czechoslovak independence by the Czech National Committee in Prague and two weeks after Czechoslovak declaration of independence in Washington and Paris. The Slovaks acted independently, as news of the Czech declaration had not reached Martin by the time of the Slovak declaration. The council attempted to take control of Slovakia but was thwarted by a Hungarian military intervention, which seized Martin on 15 November. Czech troops soon took the town, and the new government in Prague appointed Vavro Šrobár as minister for Slovakia.

Some Slovak representatives argued for autonomy for Slovakia and for the country to have its own devolved assembly, but that was rejected by the Czechoslovak government, and Šrobár dissolved the Slovak National Council in January 1919. The delegates at Turčiansky Svätý Martin had not defined exactly what they meant by the "Czecho-Slovak Nation" but seemingly had in mind a definition that upheld the distinct national identity and individuality of the Slovak people. The Slovaks had been promised to become equal partners in what Edvard Beneš, the foreign minister of the Provisional Czechoslovak government, had declared would be a Swiss-style federated state. Beneš soon afterward broke his promise.Thereafter, Slovakia was governed as part of the centralised Czechoslovak state, which had been established by the Czechoslovak National Assembly in Prague.
