= Rollercoaster (Julian Le Play song) =

Single by Julian Le Play

from the album Melodrom
- Released: 4 July 2014
- Recorded: 2012/13
- Genre: Pop
- Length: 3:36
- Label: GRIDmusic
- Songwriter(s): Julian Heidrich, Hillebrand, Nykrin, Pohn,
- Producer(s): Lukas Hillebrand; Alex Pohn

Julian Le Play singles chronology
"Mein Anker" (2014)	"Rollercoaster" (2014)	"Wir haben noch das ganze Leben" (2014)

"Rollercoaster" is a song performed by Austrian singer-songwriter and radio presenter Julian Le Play. The song was released as a digital download on 4 July 2014 as the third single from his second studio album Melodrom (2014). The song has peaked to number 17 on the Austrian Singles Chart.

== Music video ==
A music video to accompany the release of "Rollercoaster" was first released onto YouTube on 19 June 2014 at a total length of three minutes and fifty-five seconds.

== Track listing ==
Digital download
No.	Title	Length
1.	"Rollercoaster"	3:36
2.	"Rollercoaster" (Remix Nathan)	3:24
3.	"Rollercoaster" (Remix filous)	6:07
4.	"Rollercoaster" (Remix filous)	6:11
5.	"Rollercoaster" (Music video)	3:43

== Chart performance ==
Chart (2014)	Peak position
Austria (Ö3 Austria Top 40)	17

== Release history ==
Region	Date	Format	Label
Austria	4 July 2014	Digital download	GRIDmusic
