= Der Wolf (song) =

Single by Julian Le Play

from the album Melodrom
- Released: 26 April 2013
- Recorded: 2012
- Genre: Pop
- Length: 3:08
- Label: GRIDmusic
- Songwriter(s): Julian Heidrich
- Producer(s): Lukas Hillebrand; Alex Pohn

Julian Le Play singles chronology
"Land in Sicht" (2012)	"Der Wolf" (2013)	"Mein Anker" (2014)

"Der Wolf" is a German-language song performed by Austrian singer-songwriter and radio presenter Julian Le Play. The song was released as a digital download on 26 April 2013 as the lead single from his second studio album Melodrom (2014). The song peaked to number 47 on the Austrian Singles Chart.

== Music video ==
A music video to accompany the release of "Der Wolf" was first released onto YouTube on 28 April 2013 at a total length of three minutes and twenty-eight seconds.

== Track listing ==
Digital download
No.	Title	Length
1.	"Der Wolf"	3:08

== Chart performance ==
Chart (2013)	Peak position
Austria (Ö3 Austria Top 40)	47

== Release history ==
Region	Date	Format	Label
Austria	26 April 2013	Digital download	GRIDmusic
