= Hybe, Liptovský Mikuláš District =

Hybe
- Municipality
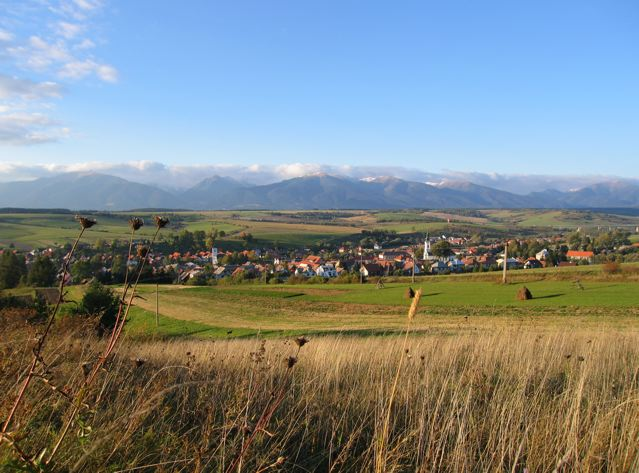
- Hybe and the Western Tatras

- Flag

- Location of Hybe in the Žilina Region Location of Hybe in Slovakia
- Coordinates: 49°02′43″N 19°49′50″E
- Country: Slovakia
- Region: Žilina Region
- District: Liptovský Mikuláš District
- First mentioned: 1239

Area
  - Total: 52.86 km^{2} (20.41 sq mi)
- Elevation: 688 m (2,257 ft)

Population (2025)
  - Total: 1,442
- Time zone: UTC+1 (CET)
  - Summer (DST): UTC+2 (CEST)
- Postal code: 323 1
- Area code: +421 44
- Vehicle registration plate (until 2022): LM
- Website: www.hybe.sk

Hybe (Hungarian: Hibbe) is a village and municipality in the Liptovský Mikuláš District in the Žilina Region of northern Slovakia.

== Names and etymology ==
The name is of Slavic (Slovak) origin with uncertain etymology. Possibly, it derives from the stem -gyb/-hyb. Proto-Slavic gybij, gybkij, gybaja, gybica, Slovak hybký - unstable, flexible, the stem is present also in words like ohyb - bending, pohyb - movement, etc. The name may refer to the character of the river Hybica.

The name was adopted by the Germans before the lenition of Slavic /g/ to /h/ in Slovak (c. 1200) - Geib.

== History ==
The village of Hybe was first mentioned in historical records in 1239 (villa Hyba). The village was founded around the end of the 12th century, as a Slovak settlement. In 1230 the village was owned by Hauk, Polk and Beuch from Uhorská Ves. In 1239, King Béla IV of Hungary took possession and associated it with the royal property. In 1396, Hybe gives from monarch market liberties and toll-free. German Sasses (likely from neighbor Spiš) moved in during the first half of the 13th century.

In 1265 Hybe purchased the rights to become a mining city and citizens began mining gold on the base of the Mount Kriváň. The village sign depicts a miner and a hoe, and has been unchanged since then. Mining eventually proved unsustainable due to the poor gold lode and high expenses incurred due to the rough terrain. Some of the gold miners went to Bocianska dolina.

In 1390 Hybe became the property of the Liptov district administrator and become villein small town of domination in Liptovský Hrádok. Between the 14th and 15th centuries, mining gave way to farming and crafts.

Despite villein ratio to Liptovský Hrádok, Hybe was an important farming and culture center of the top part of Liptov between the late-19th and mid-20th centuries. More than 20 kinds of crafts were in the village but the most widespread were builders, which became famous specialists at building of City of Budapest.

Before the establishment of independent Czechoslovakia in 1918, Hybe was part of Liptó County within the Kingdom of Hungary. From 1939 to 1945, it was part of the Slovak Republic.

== Modern day ==
Facilities in the village currently include an infant school, elementary school, palace of culture, Evangelic church, Roman Catholic Church, house of Dobroslav Chrobák and library. Both churches, memorable house of Dobroslav Chrobák, memorable house of poet Jakub Grajchman, grave of Jakub Grajchman with gravestone, memorable house of Alojz Štróbl are inhere in the Central list ancient monument foundation of Slovak Republic, on the list: Culture monuments. Entire center of village is promulgated for national culture treasure. On the present is on the village created strong sports background, local sportsmen get awards in the slovak competitions, primarily in the cross-country skiing. Hybe has very good conditions for winter sports, cyclo-tourism, tourism in Hybe gully or into mineral springs and for mushrooms. There is situated ski lift and certified racing track. In the village is a volunteer fireman brigade.

Hybe's school includes children from surrounding villages (Vyšná Boca, Nižná Boca, Kráľova Lehota, and Malužiná). The school has a well-equipped computer class as part of Slovakia's national Infovek project. Sports available include table tennis, badminton, football, and, in winter, hockey.

== Geography ==
The municipality lies at an altitude of 688 metres (2,257 ft) and covers an area of 52.86 km^{2} (20.41 sq mi) (2025).

It lies in north part of Slovak Republic. It is situated in Liptov fold between High Tatras and Low Tatras, in valley of Hybica and White Váh.

== Population ==
Population statistic (10 years)
Year	1995	2005	2015	2025
Count	1655	1587	1492	1442
Difference		−4.10%	−5.98%	−3.35%

Population statistic
Year	2024	2025
Count	1457	1442
Difference		−1.02%

It has a population of 1442 people (31 December 2025).

=== Ethnicity ===
Census 2021 (1+ %)
Ethnicity	Number	Fraction
Slovak	1420	95.94%
Not found out	54	3.64%
Total	1480	

In year 2021 was 1480 people by ethnicity 1420 as Slovak, 54 as Not found out, 12 as Czech, 12 as Romani, 5 as Polish, 4 as English, 3 as Other, 2 as Hungarian, 1 as Silesian, 1 as Russian, 1 as Moravian and 1 as Albanian.

Note on population: The difference values of population numbers in the table "Population statistic" and in the sections "Ethnicity" & "Religion" is caused by the use of various statistical methods.

=== Religion ===
Census 2021 (1+ %)
Religion	Number	Fraction
Evangelical Church	767	51.82%
Roman Catholic Church	321	21.69%
None	308	20.81%
Not found out	45	3.04%
Total	1480	

In year 2021 was 1480 people by religion 767 from Evangelical Church, 321 from Roman Catholic Church, 308 from None, 45 from Not found out, 13 from Other and not ascertained christian church, 7 from Greek Catholic Church, 7 from Ad hoc movements, 4 from United Methodist Church, 3 from Christian Congregations in Slovakia, 2 from Other, 1 from Old Catholic Church, 1 from Jehovah's Witnesses and 1 from Buddhism.

== Notable residents ==
Today's citizens of Hybe take pride in their cultural history, on men of the day, which came from Hybe and prove competent in a number of areas social and cultural life of Slovak Republic. These include: writers Jakub Grajchman and Dobroslav Chrobák, writer and screenwriter Peter Jaroš, historian and writer Rudo Brtáň, poet Július Lenko, actors Ivan Rajniak, Ondrej Jariabek, Teodor Piovarči, Slavo Záhradník, director Ondrej Rajniak, director of amateur theatre Ruzena Jariabeková, academic painter Pavol Michalides, architects Ján Svetlík, Jozef Chrobák, Vladimir Chrobák, Ján Mlynár and many others.

== Hybe in cinematography ==
Thanks to the works of the writer Peter Jaroš, Hybe has been depicted in Slovak cinematography.

=== Pacho the Brigand of Hybe (1975) ===
From director Martin Ťapák (screenplay from Hybe's writer Peter Jaroš). This movie is about the historical legend - brigand Pacho, who helped poor people and fought poverty, like Juraj Jánošík.

=== The Millennial Bee (1983) ===
A saga about the Pichandovci family of builders (based on the novel of Peter Jaroš), which is located in a small village in years 1887–1917. Many influential Slovak people in the social and cultural field collaborated on this movie. These include, Director Juraj Jakubisko, Screenwriter Peter Jaroš, Music - Petr Hapka and famous Slovak actors Michal Dočolomanský (as Valent Pichanda), Štefan Kvietik (as Samo Pichanda), Pavol Mikulík (as Julo Mitron) and the Academy Award winning actor (for The Shop on Main Street) Jozef Króner (as Martin Pichanda). The main part of movie was filmed in Hybe and supernumeraries are real citizens of Hybe.

== Genealogical resources ==
The records for genealogical research are available at the state archive (Statny Archiv) in Bytca, Slovakia.

- Roman Catholic church records (births/marriages/deaths): 1675-1923 (parish A)
- Lutheran church records (births/marriages/deaths): 1731-1895 (parish A)

== Gallery ==
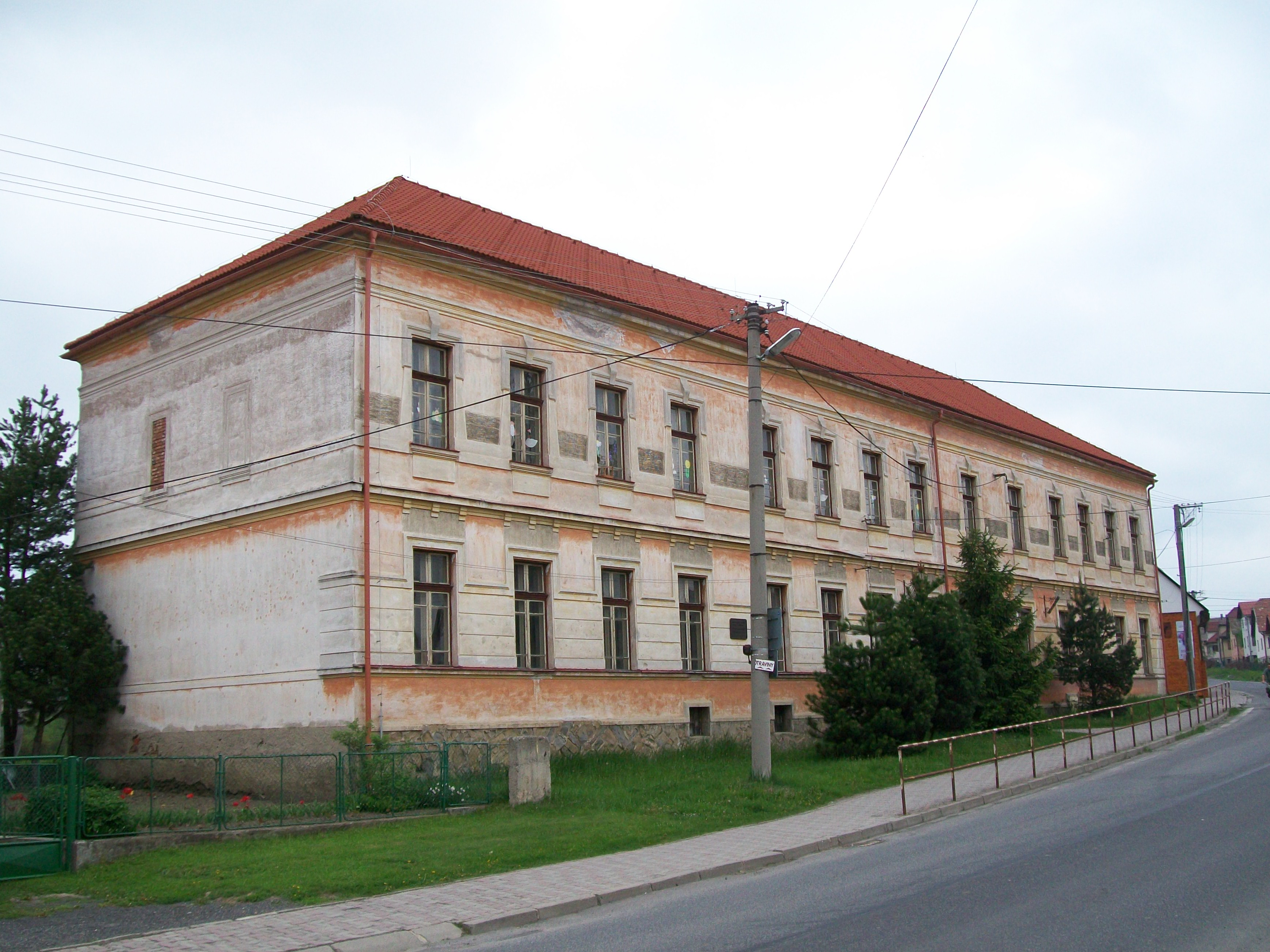
Centrum Quo vadis

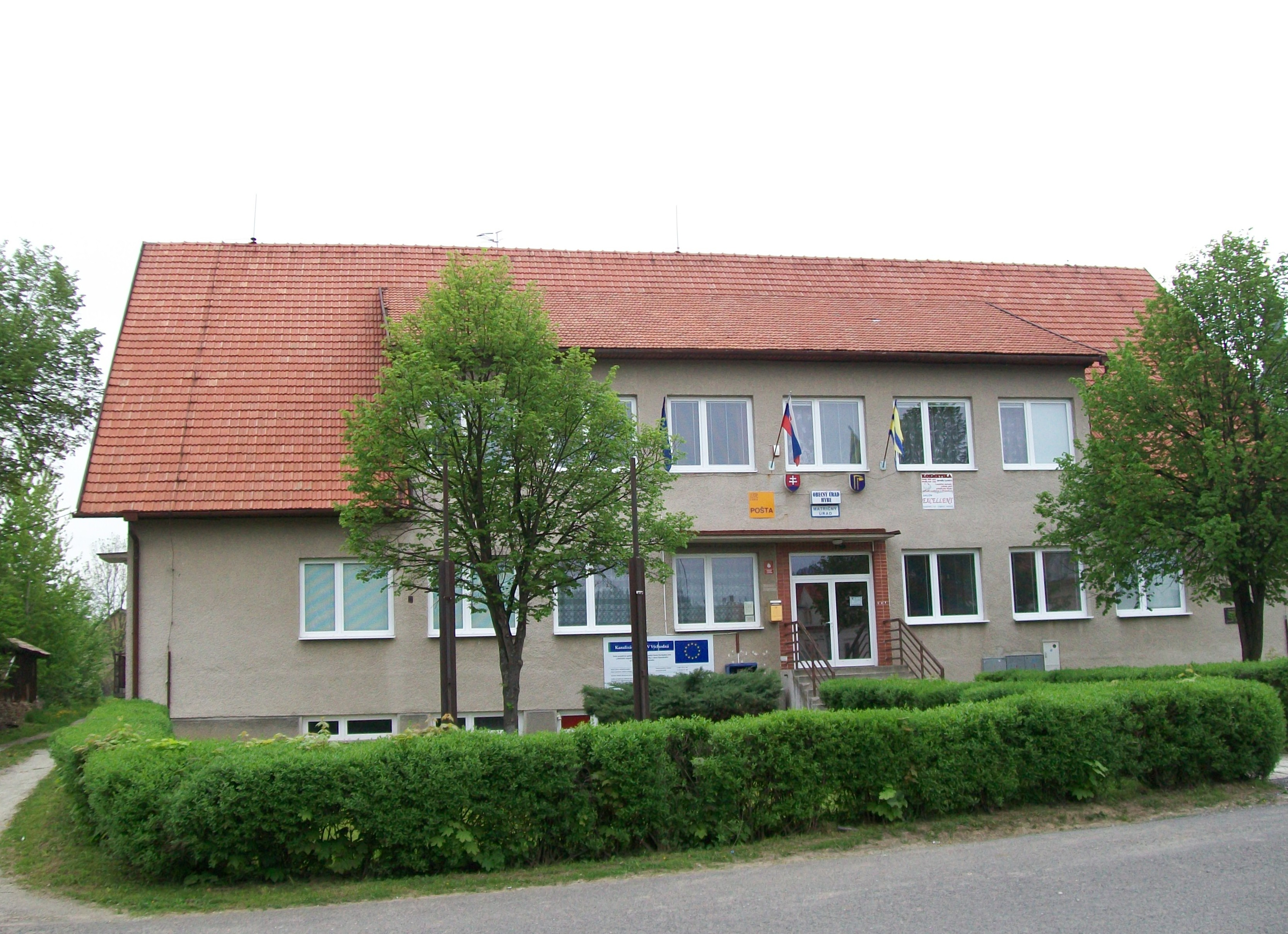
Municipality office

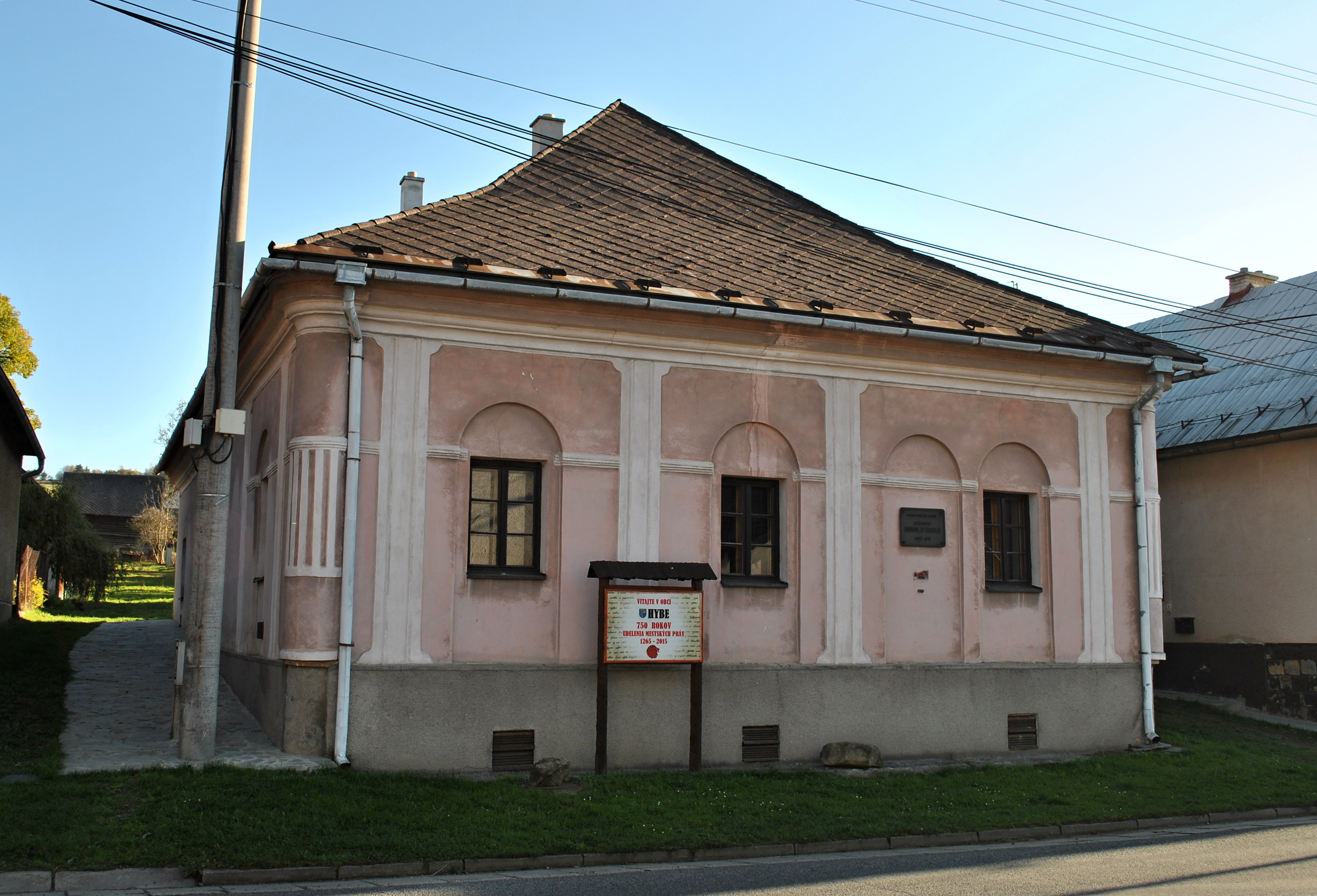
Memory house of D. Chrobák

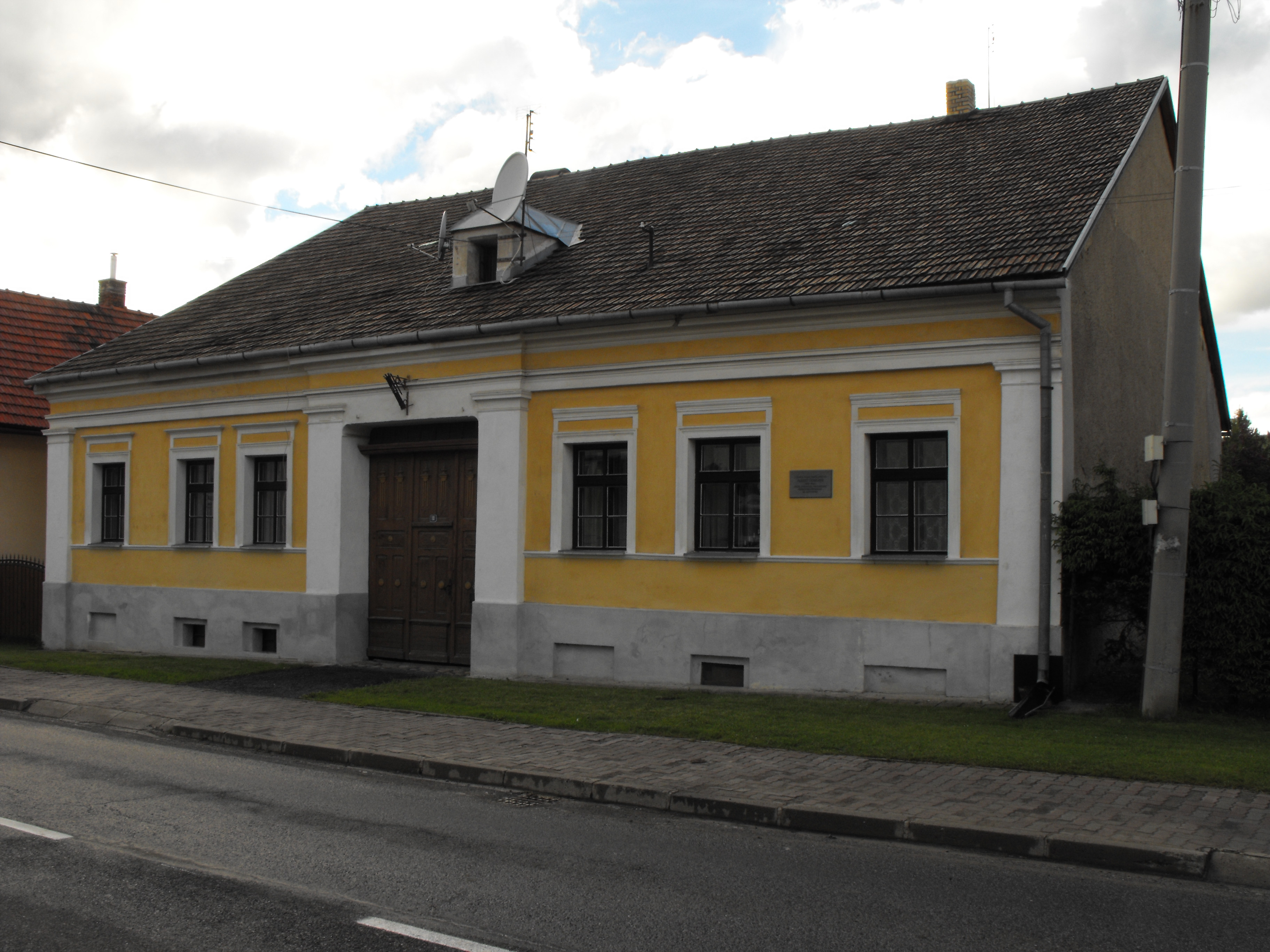
House of Albert Škarvan

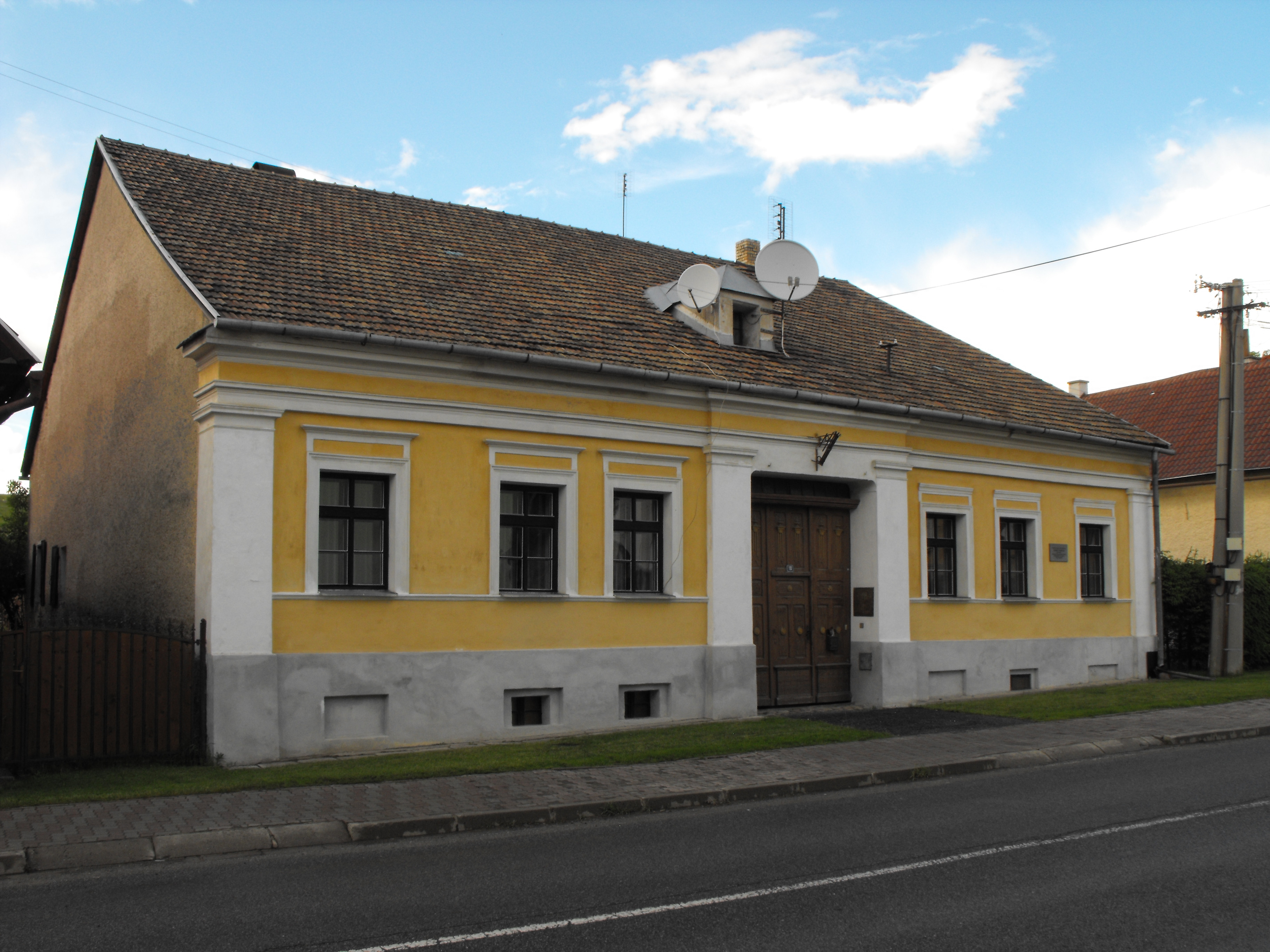
House of Albert Škarvan

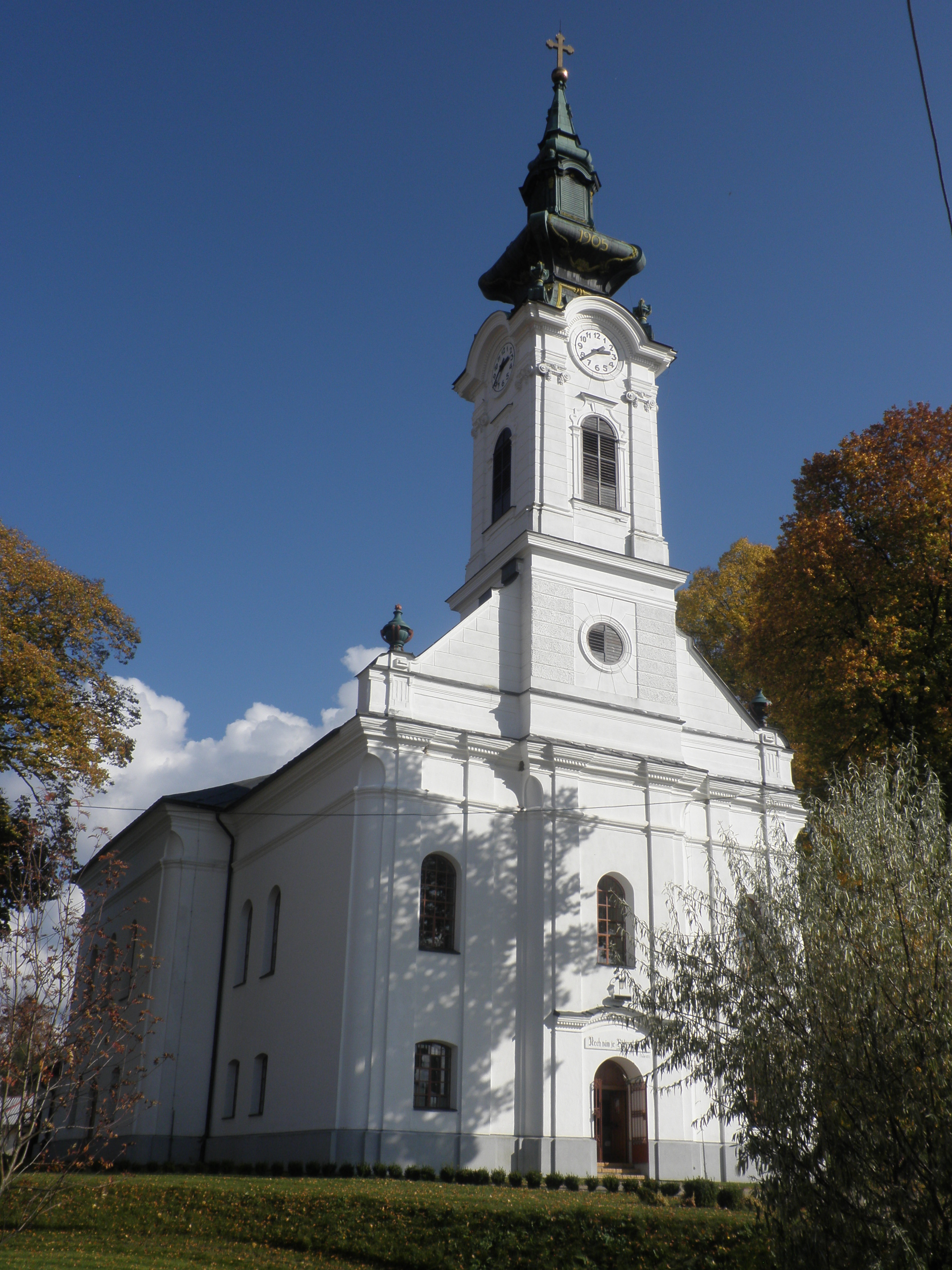
Evangelical church

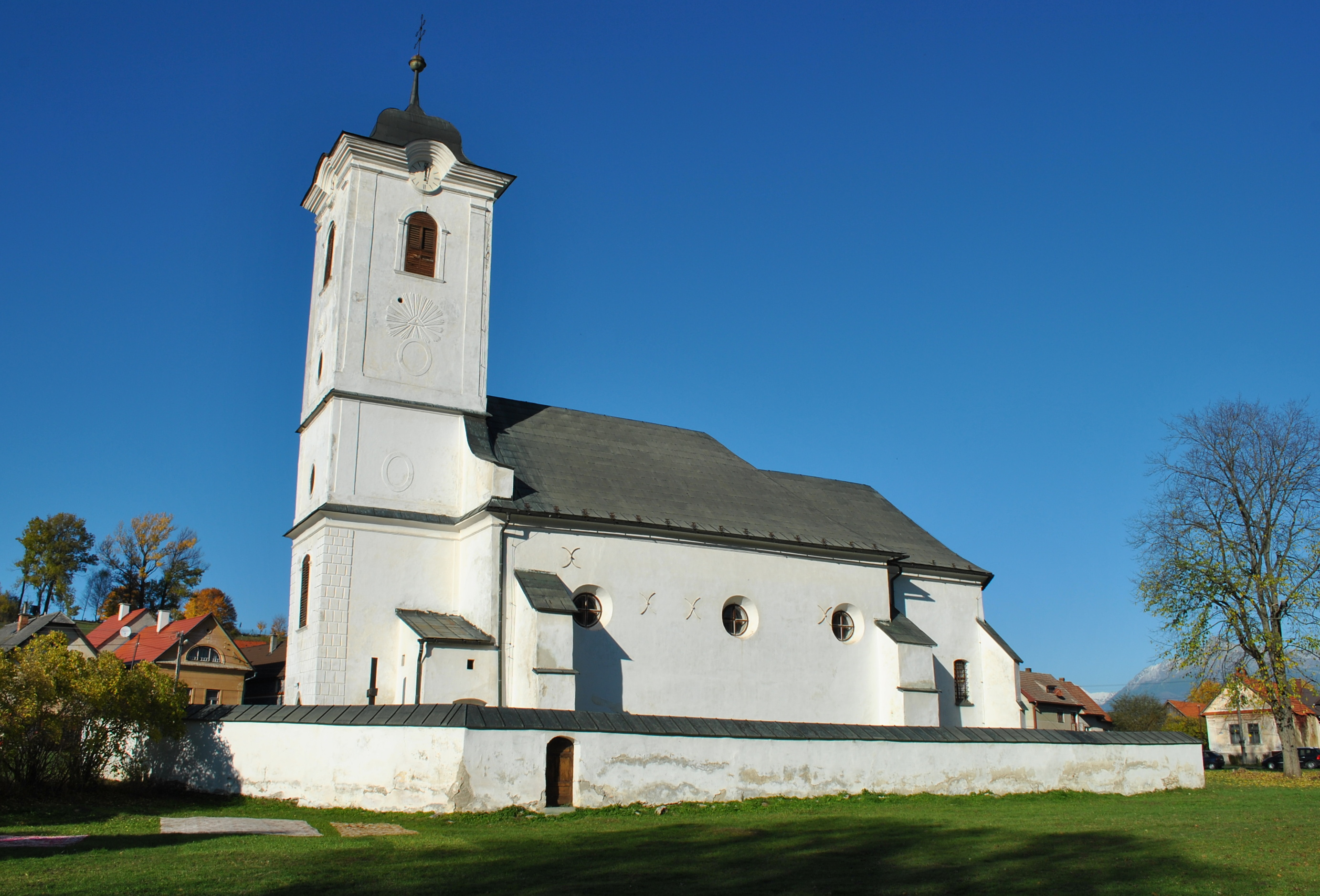
All Saints Roman-catholic church

=== Memory plates ===
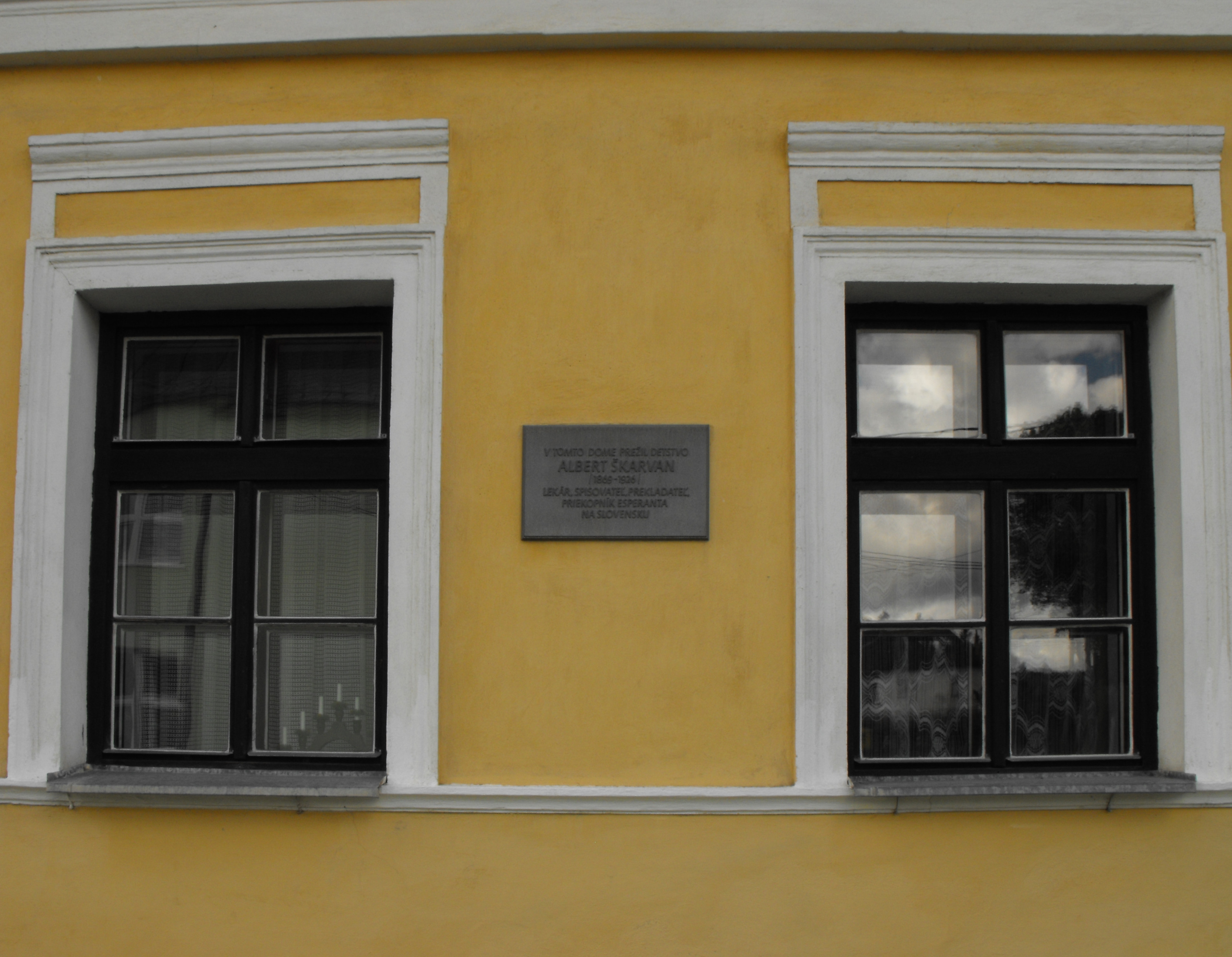
Albert Škarvan, look to the house

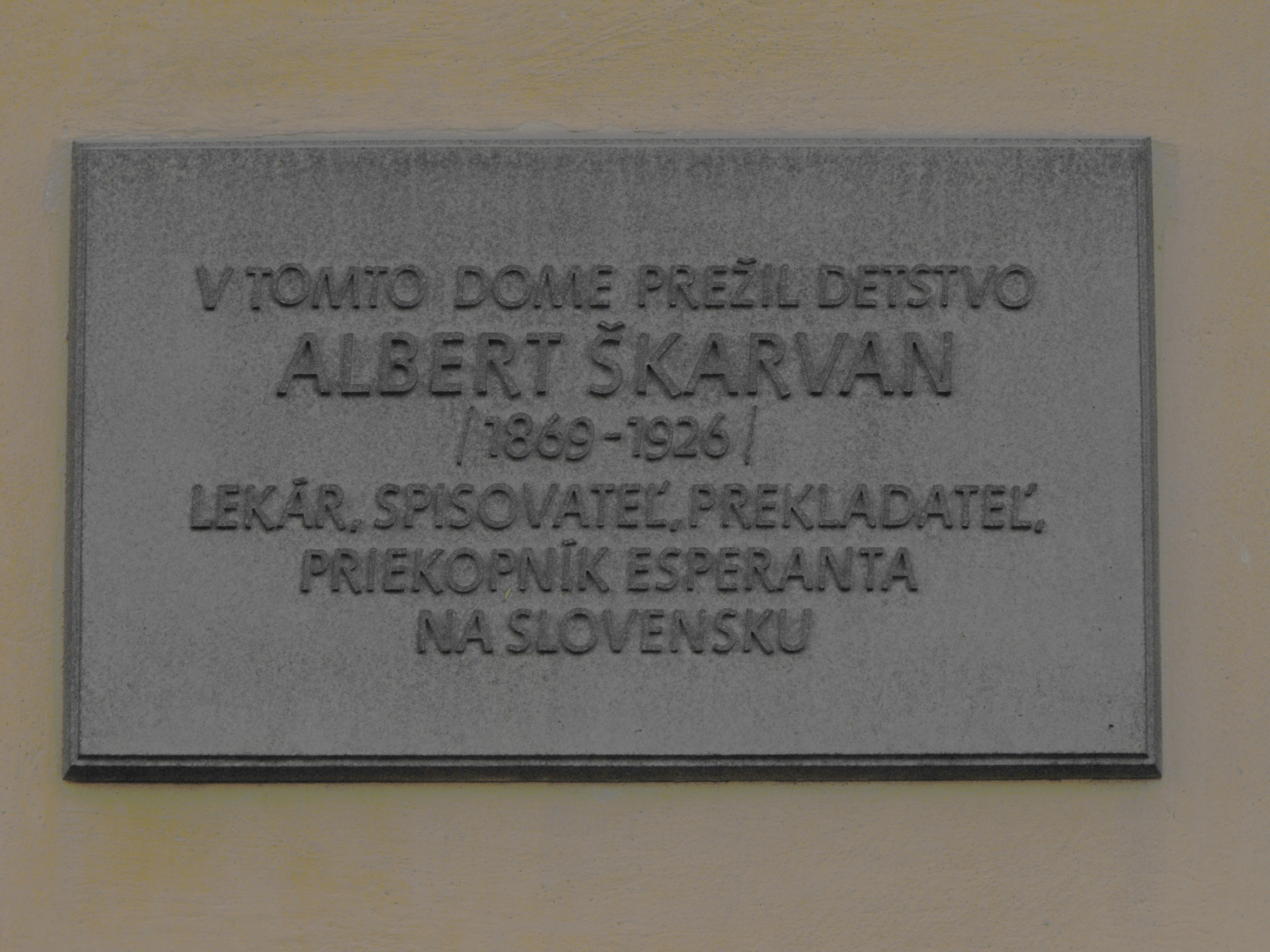
Albert Škarvan

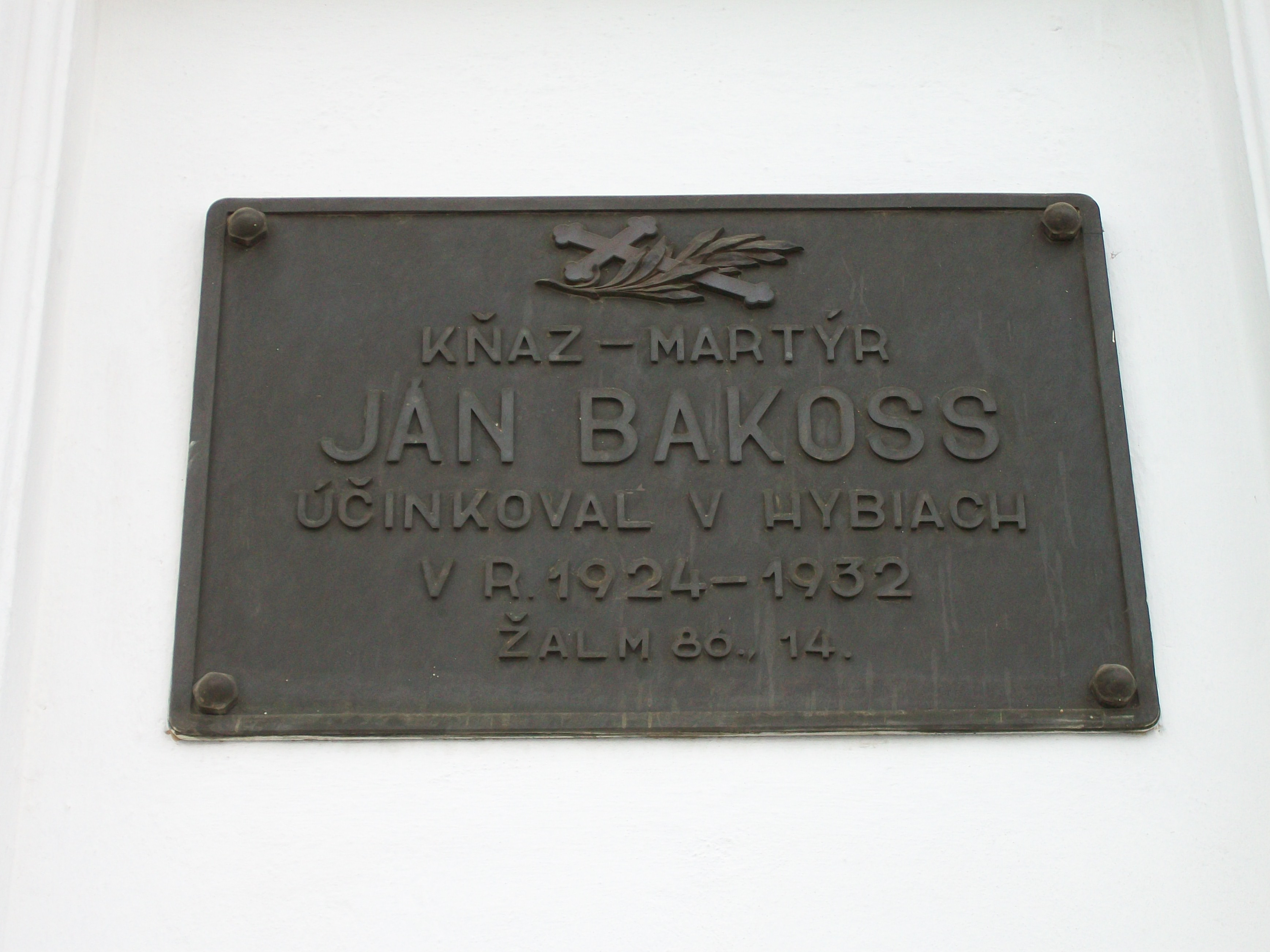
Ján Bakoss

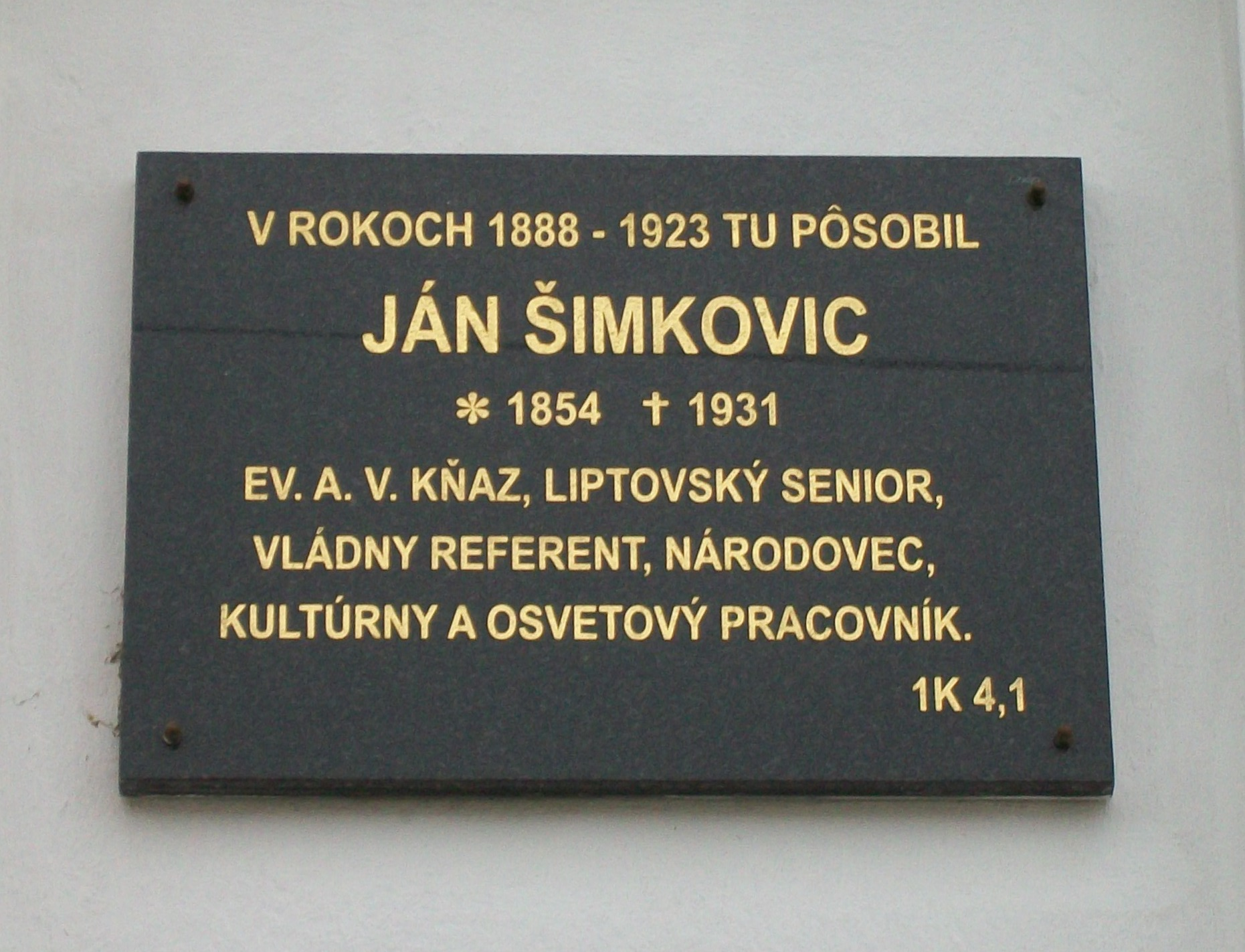
Ján Šimkovic

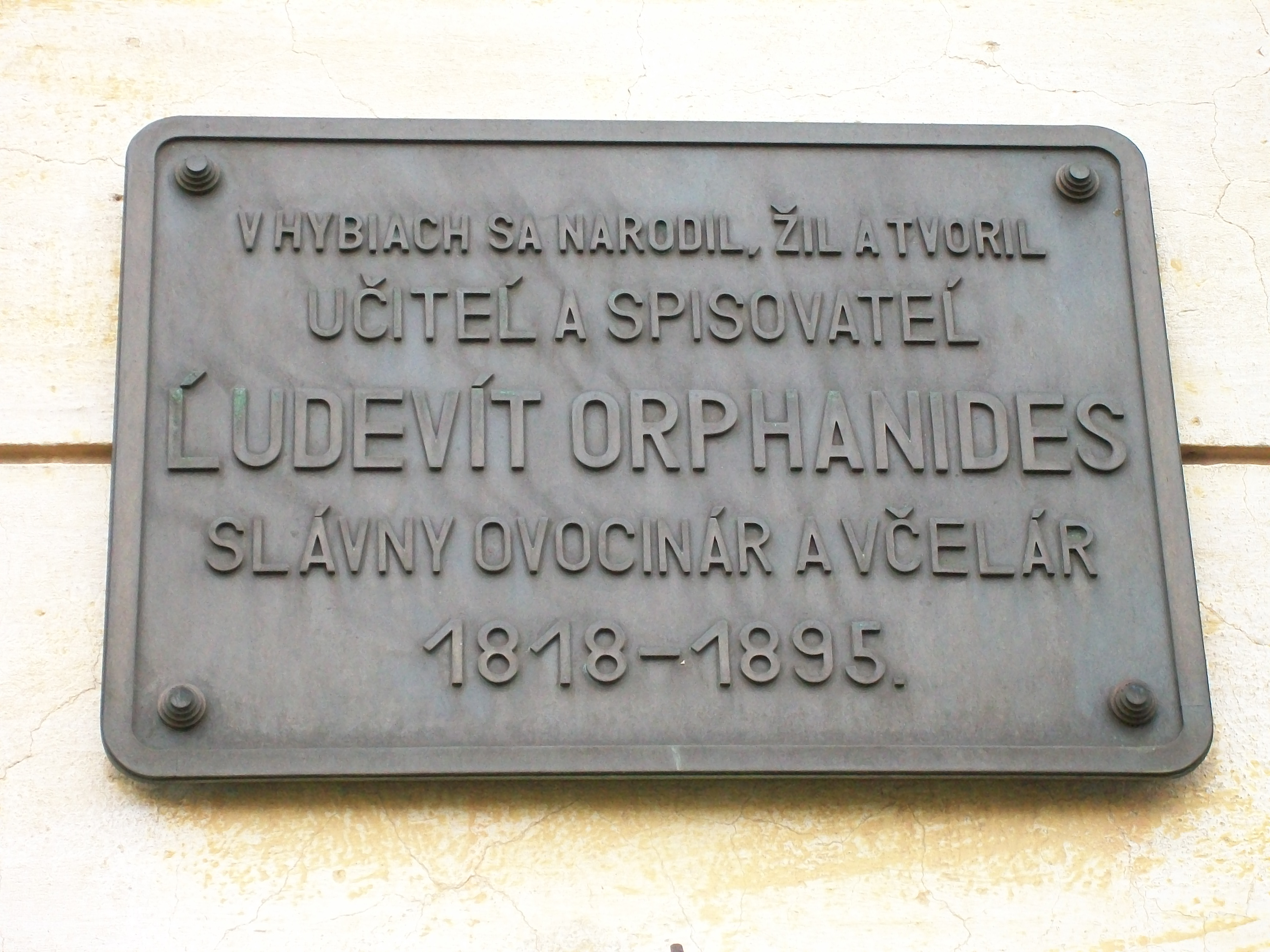
Ľudevít Orphanides

== See also ==
- List of municipalities and towns in Slovakia
