= Škarvan =

Škarvan may also refer to:

== People ==
- Albert Škarvan (1869–1926), Slovak physician, writer, translator, and Esperantist
- Jaroslav Škarvan (1944–2022), Czechoslovak handball player
- Shelley Rhead-Skarvan (born 1965), Canadian speed skater

== Other uses ==
- Skarvan and Roltdalen National Park, park in Norway.
