= Peter Jaroš =

Slovak writer and screenwriter (1940–2026)

- Jaroš in 2025
- Born: 22 January 1940; Hybe, Czechoslovakia
- Died: 8 November 2026 (aged 86); Bratislava, Slovakia
- Education: Comenius University (Prom. fil.)
- Occupations: Novelist; Short-story writer; Screenwriter; Dramaturg; Politician
- Spouse: Mária Zuzana Jarošová
- Writing career
- Language: Slovak
- Period: 1963–2026
- Works: Tisícročná včela (1979); Nemé ucho, hluché oko (1984); Pacho, hybský zbojník (screenplay, 1975)
- Notable awards: Order of Ľudovít Štúr (2000)

Member of the National Council of Slovakia (Note: Until 1 September 1992, the legislature was known as the Slovak National Council. It remained within the Czech and Slovak Federative Republic until the independence of Slovakia on 1 January 1993.)
- In office 24 June 1992 – 15 March 1994

Personal details
- Party: Democratic Left

Peter Jaroš (22 January 1940 – 8 November 2026) was a Slovak novelist, short-story writer, screenwriter, and film dramaturg. He is best known for the multigenerational novel Tisícročná včela (The Millennial Bee, 1979), widely regarded as one of the most important Slovak novels of the second half of the 20th century, and for the screenplays of two of the most popular Slovak films of the communist era, Pacho, hybský zbojník (1975) and The Millennial Bee (1983).

He wrote about three dozen books, six radio plays and eight film scripts. From 1992 to 1994 he was a member of the Slovak parliament for the Party of the Democratic Left and co-wrote the preamble to the Constitution of the Slovak Republic.

== Early life and education ==
Jaroš was born on 22 January 1940 in Hybe, a town in the Liptov region, into a working-class family. The Jaroš family traced its descent to Czech Protestant exiles who settled in the area after the Battle of White Mountain; the mother of the physician and Tolstoyan writer Albert Škarvan was his great-aunt. The history of Hybe and its people would become the principal subject of his best-known fiction.

He attended the gymnázium in Liptovský Hrádok and began writing while still at secondary school. He then studied Slovak and Russian at the Faculty of Arts of Comenius University in Bratislava, graduating in 1962.

== Career ==
=== Editor and screenwriter ===
After university Jaroš worked as an editor at the publishing house Mladé letá and completed his basic military service. He was an editor of the weekly Kultúrny život (1964–1965) and then of the literary department of Czechoslovak Radio in Bratislava (1965–1971).

From 1972 to 1990 he worked as a screenwriter and dramaturg (eventually chief dramaturg) at the state film studio Slovenská filmová tvorba at Koliba in Bratislava. There he worked with directors including Juraj Jakubisko, Martin Ťapák, Štefan Uher and Martin Hollý.

His screenplay for Ťapák's comedy Pacho, hybský zbojník (1975), adapted from his own short story in the collection Krvaviny (1970), presented a comic counterpart to the folk hero Juraj Jánošík. With Jozef Kroner in the title role, it drew more than 840,000 viewers in Slovak cinemas and was the most commercially successful Slovak film of 1970–1982.

According to Jaroš's own account, after he praised Jakubisko's Build a House, Plant a Tree (1979) in a press interview, he was summoned by the Communist Party's chief ideologist and told that Jakubisko was barred from making films about contemporary life. That restriction led Jakubisko to look for a historical subject, which became the film adaptation of Tisícročná včela. Jaroš co-wrote the screenplay with Jakubisko; the film won the Golden Phoenix at the Venice Film Festival and a prize at the festival in Seville.

=== Politics and later career ===
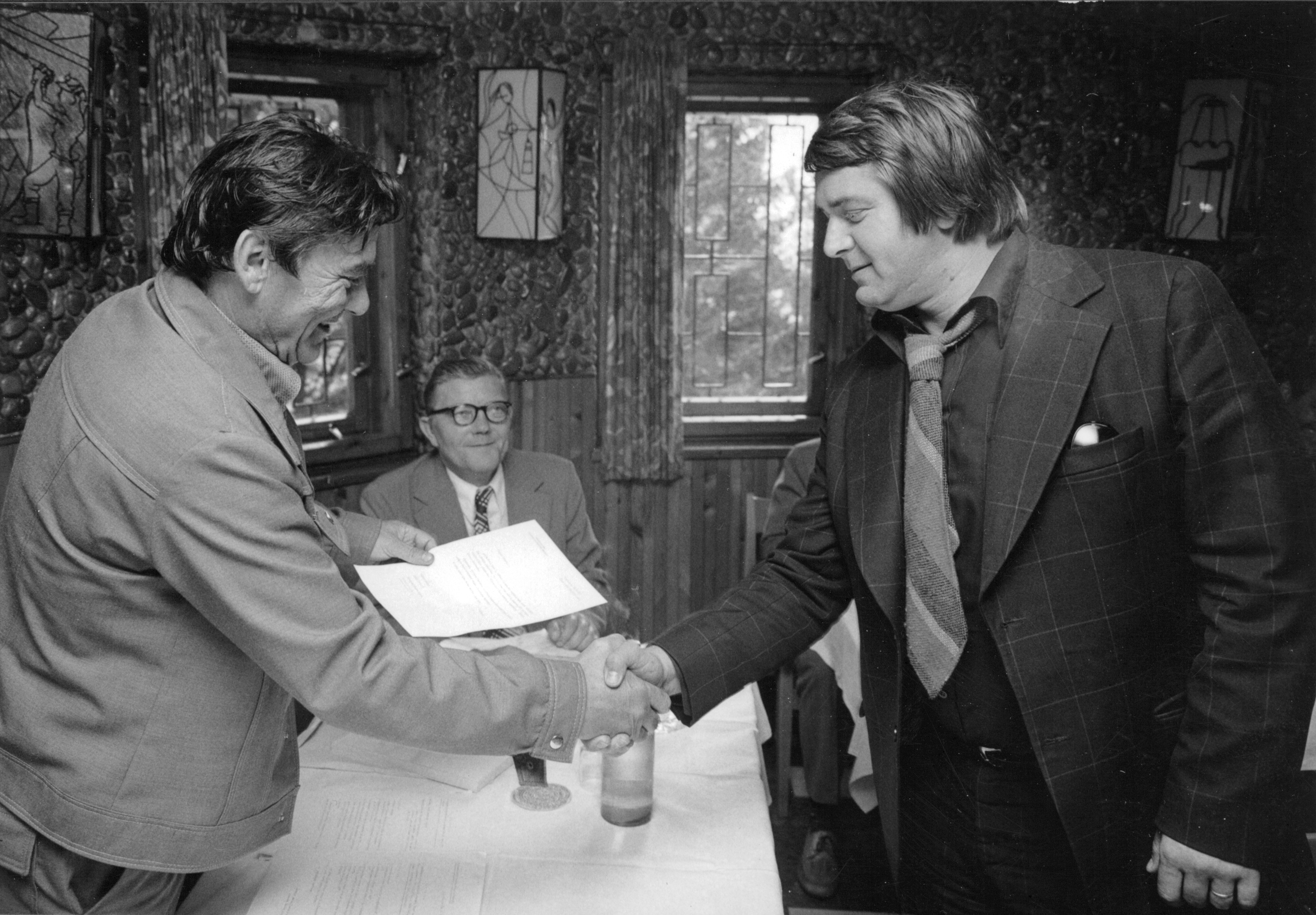
Jaroš (right) in 1997

After the Velvet Revolution, Jaroš worked as a freelance writer. In the 1992 election he was elected to the Slovak parliament (the National Council of the Slovak Republic) for the Party of the Democratic Left, serving until 1994. During this term he co-wrote the preamble to the Constitution of the Slovak Republic, adopted in September 1992.

After leaving parliament he was artistic director of the independent production company Trigon Production, and worked at the National Literary Centre (Národné literárne centrum, 1995–1999) and later at the National Centre for Edification (Národné osvetové centrum) in Bratislava.

Jaroš was for many years a member of the national committee of Matica slovenská under Vladimír Mináč. He was the honorary chairman of the Slovak Writers' Society (Spolok slovenských spisovateľov) and chaired the Ladislav Novomeský Society until 2023. He continued to publish into his eighties; his late book Pasca (The Trap), subtitled Neskorý zber (Late Harvest), includes recollections of his film career.

== Death ==
Jaroš died in Bratislava on 8 November 2026, aged 86. His death was announced by his wife, Mária Zuzana Jarošová.

== Writing ==
Jaroš belonged to the generation of prose writers who modernised Slovak literature in the mid-1960s. He debuted in 1963 with the novella Popoludnie na terase (An Afternoon on the Terrace). His early books combined psychological prose with depictions of everyday life; while, his later work showed the influence of the French nouveau roman. Critics have described his writing as consistently experimental, mixing the tragic, the comic and the grotesque with lyricism, eroticism and absurdity. Literary historian Viktor Timura's 1999 monograph divides his work into avant-garde, traditionalist and intellectual periods, with influences ranging from Jean-Paul Sartre and Alain Robbe-Grillet to Gabriel García Márquez. Critics have also singled out his inventive use of the Slovak language, including dialect words and forgotten vocabulary.

=== Tisícročná včela ===
Tisícročná včela (1979), on which Jaroš worked for nearly ten years, follows three generations of the Pichanda family of Hybe from the late 19th century to the end of the First World War. The bee of the title, Jaroš explained, stood for the Slovaks, who over a thousand years had survived and kept their language and culture through collective effort, like bees in a hive. The novel was among the most read, discussed and translated Slovak books of the 1980s. A loose sequel, Nemé ucho, hluché oko (Mute Ear, Deaf Eye), followed in 1984.

The novel has been translated into Bulgarian (1983), Polish (1985), Russian (1988), Macedonian, Hungarian and Czech, and more recently into Hindi (2016) and Spanish (La abeja milenaria, 2024).

== Selected works ==
=== Prose ===
Titles are given in Slovak, with English translations in brackets.

- Popoludnie na terase (An Afternoon on the Terrace), 1963
- Urob mi more (Make Me a Sea), 1964
- Zdesenie (Consternation), 1965
- Váhy (Scales), 1966
- Putovanie k nehybnosti (Journey to Immobility), 1967
- Menuet (Minuet), 1967
- Návrat so sochou (Return with a Statue), 1969
- Krvaviny (Blood Spots), 1970
- Keď dobehneš psa (When You Catch Up with the Dog), 1971
- Pýr (Couch Grass), 1971
- Trojúsmevový miláčik (Smiling Sweetie), 1973
- Pradeno (Skein), 1974
- Telo v herbári (A Body in the Herbarium), 1979
- Tisícročná včela (The Millennial Bee), 1979
- Parádny výlet (A Fine Trip), 1982
- Nemé ucho, hluché oko (Mute Ear, Deaf Eye), 1984
- Lásky hmat (Love's Touch), 1988
- Psy sa ženia (Dogs Get Married), 1990
- Milodar slučka (Noose Offering), 1991
- Biela pani, mŕtvy pán (A White Lady and a Dead Gentleman), 1991
- Grimasy (Grimaces), 1996
- Loď lásky alebo Kronika dobrých nádejí (The Ship of Love, or The Chronicle of Good Hopes), 2000
- Pasca. Neskorý zber (The Trap: Late Harvest), 2021

=== Screenplays ===
Film and television scripts written by Jaroš include:

- Deň slnovratu (The Day of Solstice), 1973
- Studené podnebie (Cold Climate), television film, 1974
- Pacho, hybský zbojník (Pacho, the Brigand of Hybe), 1975, directed by Martin Ťapák
- Tetované časom (Tattooed by Time), 1975
- Sneh pod nohami (Snow Underfoot), 1978
- Tisícročná včela (The Millennial Bee), 1983, with Juraj Jakubisko, who also directed

As a dramaturg at Koliba he worked on films including Nevera po slovensky (1981), Noční jazdci (1981), Skleníková Venuša (1985) and Cena odvahy (1986).

=== Radio plays ===
Jaroš wrote six radio plays:

- Splynutie (Merging), 1968
- Kráľovstvo Chimenéza (The Kingdom of Jimenez), 1969
- Skrývačka (Hide and Seek), 1971
- Omyl (Mistake), 1973
- Hlboko v zeleni (Deep in the Green), 1974
- Červený spln (Red Moon), 1975

== Awards and honours ==
- 1998: Leo Danihels Award
- 2000: Order of Ľudovít Štúr, 2nd class
- 2009: Prize of the Minister of Culture of the Slovak Republic, for lifetime contribution to prose and film writing
- 2012: Honorary citizen of Hybe
- 2014: Slovak Writers' Society prize for lifetime achievement
- 2019: Extraordinary Igric Award (Slovak film prize)
- 2025: Extraordinary Prize of Matica slovenská, for his contribution to Slovak culture, film and literature
- 2026: Honorary recognition of the Ladislav Novomeský Society, for his lifetime contribution to Slovak culture
