= Ján Lajčiak =

Slovak cultural theorist (1875–1918)

- Born: 25 July 1875; Pribylina, Austria-Hungary
- Died: 28 October 1918 (aged 43); Vyšná Boca, Czechoslovakia
- Education: Sorbonne University; Leipzig University
- Occupation: Lutheran pastor
- Notable work: Slovakia and Culture

Ján Lajčiak (25 July 1875 – 28 October 1918) was a Slovak Lutheran pastor and philologist. He authored Slovakia and Culture, the first analysis of the Slovak society using sociological methods.

== Biography ==
Ján Lajčiak was born into an ethnic Slovak family on 25 July 1875 in the village of Pribylina in Austria-Hungary. He was educated at the grammar school in Banská Bystrica and studied theology in Prešov. Afterwards he worked as an assistant pastor in Budapest. In 1902 he received a doctorate in oriental languages from the Leipzig University and in 1905 he obtained another doctorate in theology from Sorbonne. During his studies in Paris, he became close friends with the politician Milan Rastislav Štefánik.

In spite of his Lajčiak's outstanding education, he was unable to secure a position at university or prestigious parish, as his ideas were perceived as too liberal within the Lutheran church circles. In addition, his nationalist views barred him from returning to his previous position in Budapest. Until the end of his life, he worked as a Lutheran pastor in the small village of Vyšná Boca.

In spite of his life in isolation as a pastor of a small village in the mountains, Lajčiak stayed active as an intellectual. He dedicated himself to translating the entire New Testament, which he felt was needed because Slovak Lutherans at the time still relied on the Czech Bible of Kralice translation from the 16th century. Nonetheless, he did not manage to complete the project before his death. In addition to his translation work, he continued to develop his studies of the prophet Ezekiel, that he started during his studies at Sorbonne.

=== Slovakia and culture ===
Lajčiak's most important work, Slovakia and Culture, was inspired by German and French debates about the role of culture and civilization and also by English-language writings by Matthew Arnold and Edward Burnett Tylor. Max Weber's concept of ideal type was an important cornerstone of his analysis. Lajčiak could not find a publisher for his book and spent his last years saving money for publication. The book was eventually published in 1920, two years after the author's death.

Slovakia and Culture is a pioneering sociological and cultural critique of early 20th-century Slovak society who lived in the Kingdom of Hungary. Rejecting nationalist idealization, Lajčiak examines the Slovak people through the lens of modern science, acknowledging both their virtues and vices. He condemns social stagnation, passivity, alcoholism, and intellectual lethargy, arguing that many hardships stem not only from political oppression but also from internal failings. Equally critical of the clergy, intelligentsia, and public conformity, he stresses the need for strong individuals capable of resisting mass opinion. Though a Lutheran pastor, Lajčiak embraces Darwin's ideas and criticizes the Church for resisting intellectual progress.

== Personal life ==
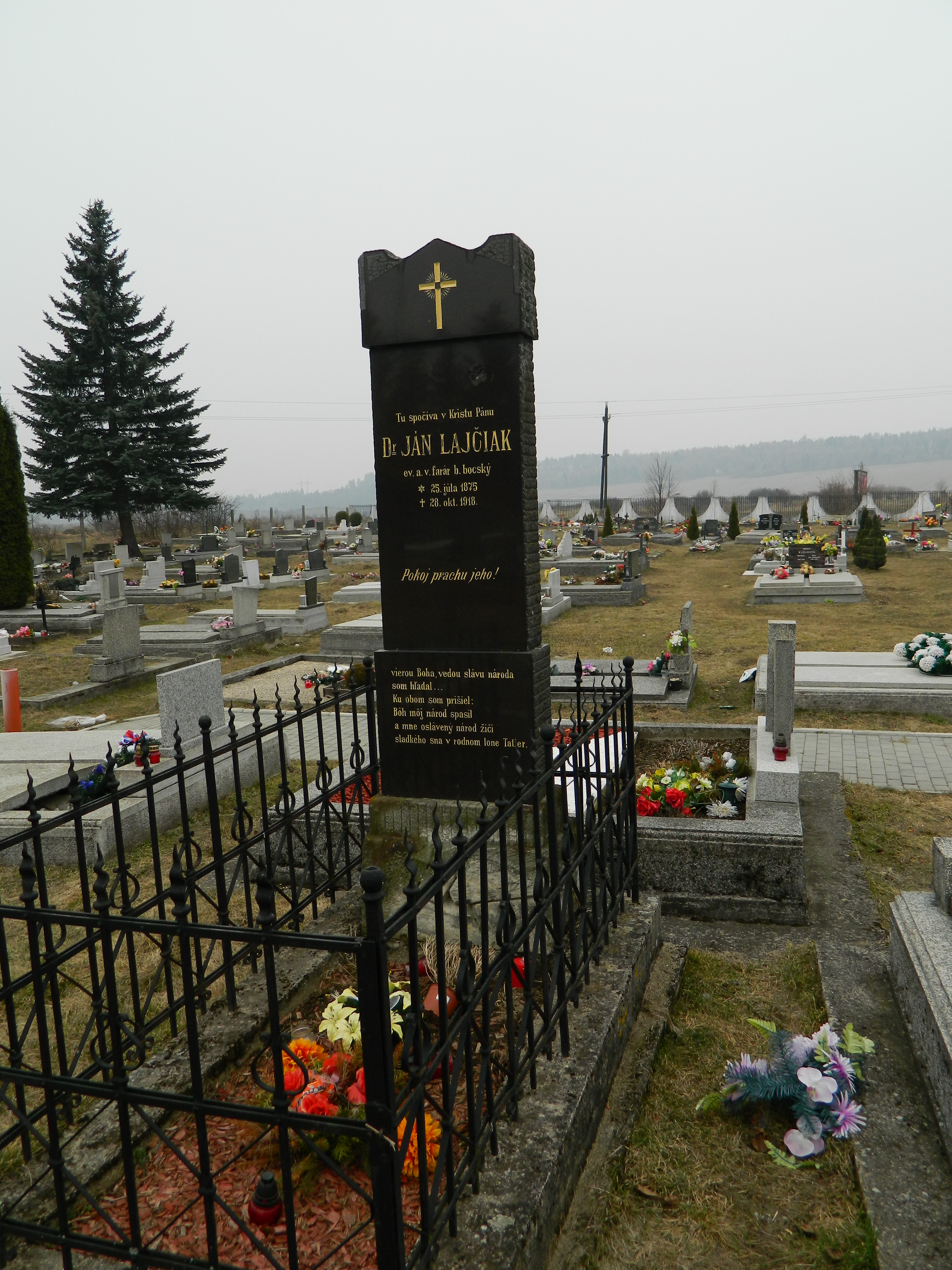
Tomb of Ján Lajčiak

Lajčiak was a polyglot. In addition to his native Slovak language, he was fluent in Hungarian, German, English, Russian, French and Italian and proficient in Suret, Aramaic, Sanskrit, Romani as well as Chinese, Biblical Greek and Hebrew languages.

Ján Lajčiak died from pneumonia on 28 October 1918 in Vyšná Boca. According to the some accounts, he died happy after an assistant told him the independence of Czechoslovakia was proclaimed earier on the date of his death. He was buried at the cemetery in his home village of Pribylina.

Although he was engaged in his youth, his fiancée broke off the engagement when he was unable to secure a prestigious job after his studies. Lajčiak remained unmarried and childless until his death.

== Legacy ==
Immediately after Lajčiak’s death, his work fell into near obscurity, known only to a small circle of Lutheran clergy. Although Lajčiak managed to save a substantial sum of money, through livestock trading and beekeeping, to finance the publication of Slovakia and Culture, the manuscript initially attracted little interest. Only in 1920-three years after his passing the book was edited and published by Lutheran pastor Samuel Štefan Osuský. Even after its publication, the book was largely overlooked by the broader society. The only published review written by Juraj Janoška in Church letters is quite negative and states that "the book is unjustly, almost prejudicially harsh and severe, and gives the impression of a work by a broken man." After the independence of Slovakia, over 70 years after Lajčiak's passing, interest in his work gradually began to resurface. An important obstacle to sudying Lajčiak's work was removed in 2020, when a new edition Slovakia and Culture was published and the book was released as an open access text online by the Sme daily, making the book accessible to new generation of readers.
