= Esperanto in Slovakia =

International auxiliary language in Slovakia

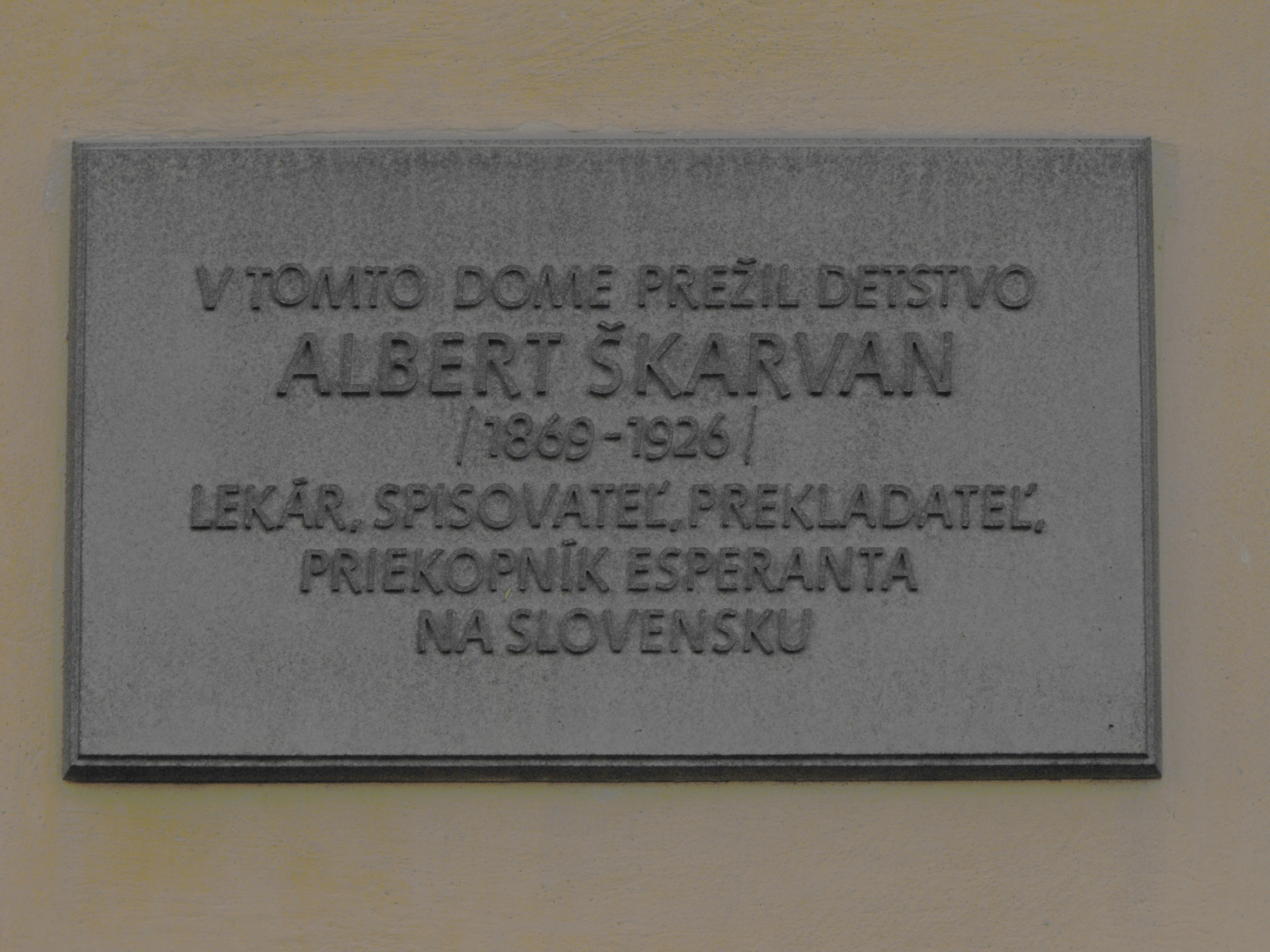
An Esperanto plaque in Slovakia commemorating Albert Škarvan.

Esperanto has been used in Slovakia since the 19th century. The Slovak Esperanto movement was suppressed by Nazi and Communist regimes in the 20th century before being restored in 1969. Slovakia is home to the Summer Esperanto Study and the Conference on the Application of Esperanto in Science and Technology.

== Linguistics ==
The Slovak language has been compared with Esperanto due to its high intelligibility to speakers of other Slavic languages, and it has been described as the "Slavic Esperanto". The Esperanto word for Slovakia is Slovakio.

== History ==
Czechoslovakia was the only country in Eastern Europe where the Esperanto movement was not condemned by the government during the interwar period. By 1928, there were 8,967 recorded Esperantists in Czechoslovakia. Radio in Czechoslovakia began airing Esperanto broadcasts in the 1930s. The German Esperanto League in Czechoslovakia was dissolved in 1938 in response to the occupation of Czechoslovakia. Interhelpo was founded as a socialist movement in Žilina to support the Kirghiz Soviet Socialist Republic in 1923.

The Communist Party took power in Czechoslovakia in 1948 and suppressed the Esperanto movement in the country. The Esperanto Association in the Czechoslovak Republic (EAĈSR) was the primary Esperanto group in Czechoslovakia, and its 1950 congress attracted nearly a thousand participants. Between 1950 and 1951, Esperanto media outlets were shut down in Czechoslovakia, and EAĈSR was disbanded in 1952. Slovak Esperantist Alexander Dubček ruled the Communist Party of Czechoslovakia and was the de facto leader of Czechoslovakia in 1968–1969. The Slovak Esperanto movement was restored in 1969, and the Association of Esperantists in the Slovak Socialist Republic was created.

The Summer Esperanto Study was established as an event to learn Esperanto by the Slovak non-profit E@I in 2007. The Conference on the Application of Esperanto in Science and Technology has been held in Slovakia since 2010. Publisher Peter Baláž is influential in the Slovak Esperantist movement, having been chosen as the Esperantist of the Year in 2012.

== See also ==
- Demographics of Slovakia
- Languages of Slovakia

== Bibliography ==
- Forster, Peter G. (1982). The Esperanto Movement. ISBN 9789027933997.
- Lins, Ulrich (2016). Dangerous Language — Esperanto Under Hitler and Stalin. Palgrave Macmillan. ISBN 9781349715053.
- Lins, Ulrich (2017). Dangerous Language — Esperanto and the Decline of Stalinism. Palgrave Macmillan. ISBN 9781352000207.
