= The Millennial Bee =

- Promotional poster
- Directed by: Juraj Jakubisko
- Written by: Juraj Jakubisko; Peter Jaros (novel)
- Starring: Jozef Kroner; Stefan Kvietik; Michal Dočolomanský; Jana Janovská
- Cinematography: Stanislav Dorsic
- Edited by: Judita Fatulová; Patrik Pass
- Music by: Petr Hapka
- Release date: 1983
- Running time: 162 minutes
- Countries: Czechoslovakia; West Germany
- Languages: Slovak, Czech

The Millennial Bee (Slovak: Tisícročná včela, also known in English as The Bee Millennium) is a 1983 film made and produced in Czechoslovakia, West Germany and Austria. The film is based on a novel written by Peter Jaroš and was directed by Juraj Jakubisko. The film was selected as the Czechoslovak entry for the Best Foreign Language Film at the 57th Academy Awards, but was not accepted as a nominee.

== Cast ==
- Jozef Kroner as Martin Pichanda
- Štefan Kvietik as Samo
- Michal Dočolomanský as Valent
- Jana Janovská as Ruzena
- Eva Jakoubková as Kristína
- Ivana Valesová as Mária
- Pavol Mikulík as Julo
- Igor Cillík as Svanda
- Jirí Císler as Belányi

== Film awards ==
- (Italy) XL. Venice Film Festival 1984
  • Golden Phoenix for The best art direction and cinematography
  • Catholic Prize
- (Socialist Federal Republic of Yugoslavia) FEST Belgrade 1984
  • UNICEF Prize
- (Spain) IV. IFF Sevilla 1984
  • Grand Prize
- (Czechoslovakia) Czechoslovak Journalists' Prize
- (Czechoslovakia) XXII. Film Festival Banská Bystrica 1984
  • Grand Prize

== See also ==
- List of submissions to the 57th Academy Awards for Best Foreign Language Film
- List of Czechoslovak submissions for the Academy Award for Best Foreign Language Film
