= Jakub Grajchman =

Slovak poet, playwright, and writer (1822–1897)

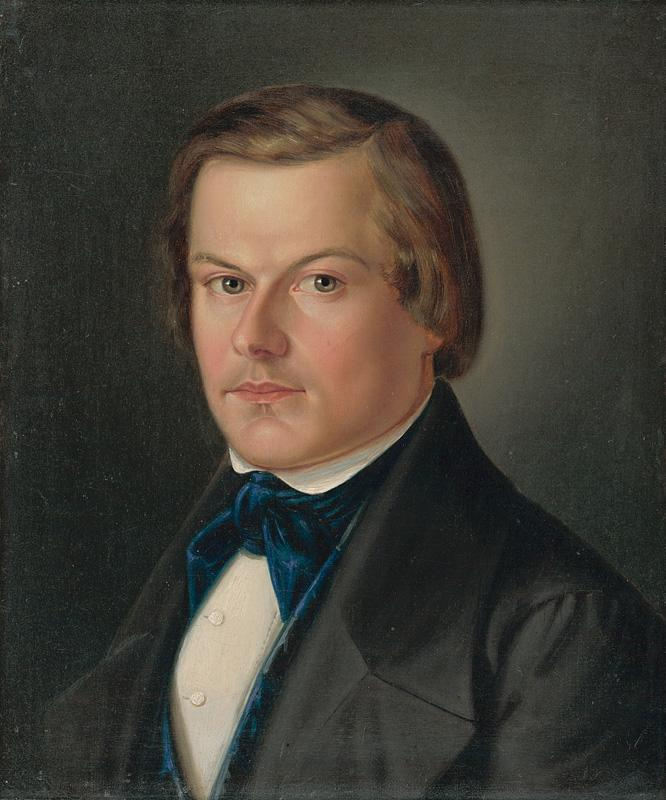
- Portrait by Peter Michal Bohúň
- Born: Jakub Graichman; July 25, 1822; Hybe, Austrian Empire (now Slovakia
- Died: June 9, 1897 (aged 74); Hybe, Austria-Hungary (now Slovakia)
- Education: University of Prešov
- Occupations: Writer, educator
- Writing career
- Language: Slovak, German

Jakub Grajchman (25 July 1822 – 9 June 1897) was a Slovak poet, educator, dramatist, and romanticist. He was also a Slovak nationalist.

== Biography ==
Grajchman was born Jakub Graichman on 25 July 1822 in Hybe, Austrian Empire (now Slovakia). He would begin spelling Graichman Grajchman, the Slovak equivalent of his German surname, in later life in support of Ľudovít Štúr's standardization of the Slovak language. As a child, he attended school in Kežmarok, Gemer, and Levoča and had Peter Michal Bohúň as a classmate. He then studied Evangelical theory in Bratislava, Halle, and Berlin and attended University of Prešov, where he studied law. He taught in Bratislava and Košice (1848) before moving to Liptovský Mikuláš, where he was a notary and a court assistant until 1854. He was part of the revolutions across the Austrian Empire in 1848–1849. He then worked as a court assistant in Dolný Kubín 1854–1859 before returning to Liptovský Mikuláš, where he became a courtroom advisor. In 1867, he returned to his birthplace of Hybe to live out his last 11 years. He also lived in Liptovský Hrádok for a period.

He wrote many dramas, poems, articles, and plays in German and Slovak, sometimes using the "Štúrovo spirit of a national folk song." He contributed to such journals and almanacs as Orol tatranský (Orol tatránski), Nitra (Nitra), Lipa (Lipa), Sokol, Minerva, Slovanský almanach, and Živena Grajchman was not a popular writer during his lifetime. His works include Melancholický gavalier (play), Básnické spisy Jakuba Grajchmana (collection of poems), Ako to bolo? (love drama), Kto zaplatí nohavice? (comedy), Zakliaty tulipán (ballad), and Divná dáma (poem). Though Grajchman wrote primarily for amateur theatres, Kto zaplatí nohavice? was made into a radio program and a TV performance was broadcast in 1987.

Grajchman died on 9 June 1897 in Hybe, where he is buried.
