= Pribylina =

- Municipality
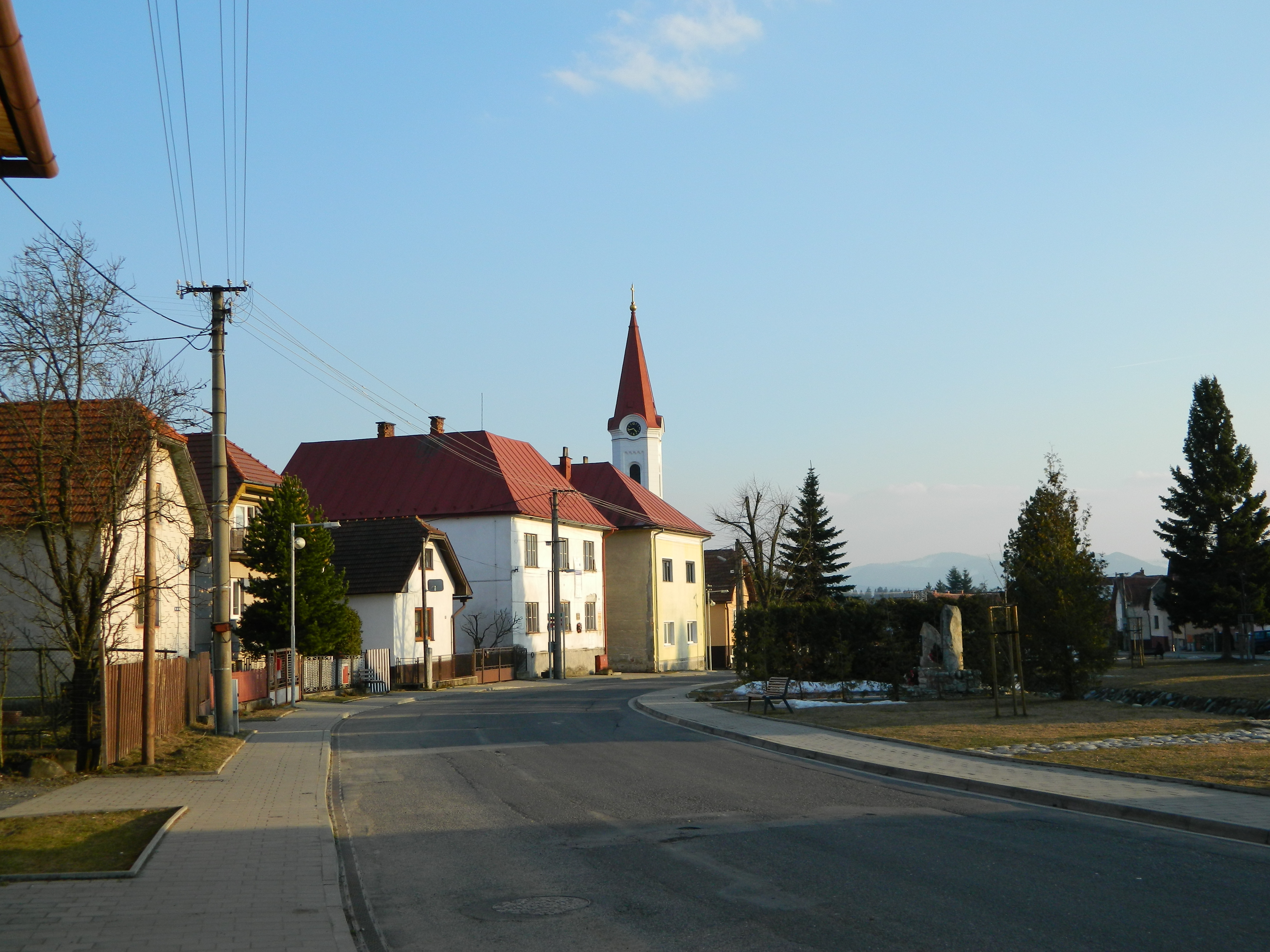

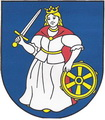
- Flag Coat of arms

- Location of Pribylina in the Žilina Region Location of Pribylina in Slovakia
- Coordinates: 49.10°N 19.80°E
- Country: Slovakia
- Region: Žilina Region
- District: Liptovský Mikuláš District
- First mentioned: 1286

Area
  - Total: 73.93 km^{2} (28.54 sq mi)
- Elevation: 768 m (2,520 ft)

Population (2025)
  - Total: 1,309
- Time zone: UTC+1 (CET)
  - Summer (DST): UTC+2 (CEST)
- Postal code: 324 2
- Area code: +421 44
- Vehicle registration plate (until 2022): LM
- Website: www.pribylina.sk/sk

Pribylina (Hungarian: Pribilina) is a village in Liptovský Mikuláš District in the Žilina Region of northern Slovakia, at the foot of Kriváň, Slovakia's symbolic and often considered most beautiful mountain.

== History ==
In historical records the village was first mentioned in 1286. Before the establishment of independent Czechoslovakia in 1918, it was part of Liptó County within the Kingdom of Hungary. From 1939 to 1945, it was part of the Slovak Republic.

== Geography ==
The municipality lies at an altitude of 768 metres (2,520 ft) and covers an area of 73.93 km^{2} (28.54 sq mi) (2025). There is an open-air museum of Liptov near the village, opened in 1991. There is an Autocamp near the entrance of the Račková valley. The river Belá flowing around the village is suitable for rafting.

== Population ==
Population statistic (10 years)
Year	1995	2005	2015	2025
Count	1343	1374	1318	1309
Difference		+2.30%	−4.07%	−0.68%

Population statistic
Year	2024	2025
Count	1316	1309
Difference		−0.53%

It has a population of 1309 people (31 December 2025).

=== Ethnicity ===
Census 2021 (1+ %)
Ethnicity	Number	Fraction
Slovak	1258	94.8%
Romani	294	22.15%
Not found out	49	3.69%
Total	1327	

In year 2021 was 1327 people by ethnicity 1258 as Slovak, 294 as Romani, 49 as Not found out, 11 as Czech, 11 as Other, 6 as Rusyn, 6 as Russian, 5 as Polish, 2 as Romanian, 2 as Hungarian, 1 as Jewish, 1 as Irish, 1 as Ukrainian, 1 as Turkish, 1 as Italian, 1 as German and 1 as Moravian.

Note on population: The difference values of population numbers in the table "Population statistic" and in the sections "Ethnicity" & "Religion" is caused by the use of various statistical methods.

=== Religion ===
Census 2021 (1+ %)
Religion	Number	Fraction
Evangelical Church	588	44.31%
Roman Catholic Church	459	34.59%
None	194	14.62%
Not found out	44	3.32%
Greek Catholic Church	16	1.21%
Total	1327	

In year 2021 was 1327 people by religion 588 from Evangelical Church, 459 from Roman Catholic Church, 194 from None, 44 from Not found out, 16 from Greek Catholic Church, 6 from Eastern Orthodox Church, 6 from Other, 4 from United Methodist Church, 2 from Other and not ascertained christian church, 2 from Jehovah's Witnesses, 2 from Baptists Church, 2 from Ad hoc movements, 1 from Islam and 1 from Church of the Brethren.

== Notable people ==
Ján Lajčiak (1875–1918), Lutheran priest and author
