= Dobroslav Chrobák =

Slovak writer

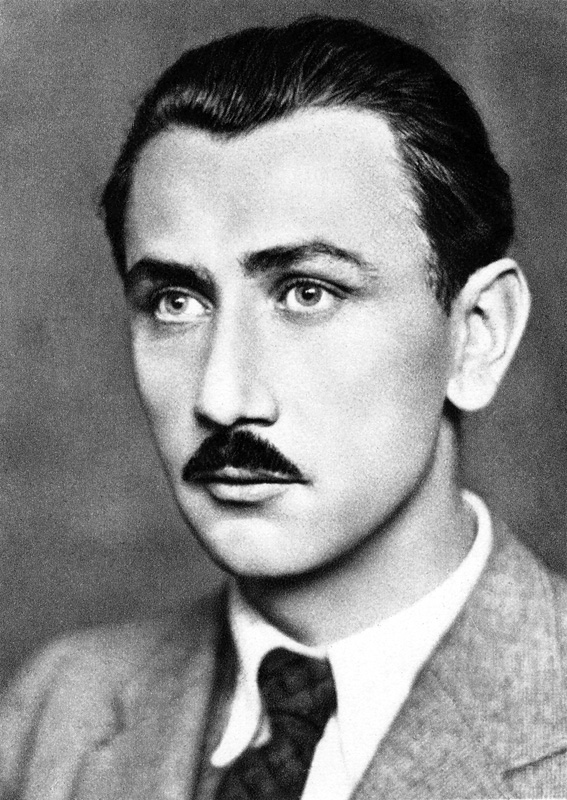
- Portrait of Dobroslav Chrobák
- Born: February 16, 1907; Hybe, Austria-Hungary (now Slovakia)
- Died: May 16, 1951 (aged 44); Bratislava, Czechoslovakia (now Slovakia)
- Occupations: Writer, essayist, critic, journalist

Dobroslav Chrobák (16 February 1907 – 16 May 1951) was a Slovak writer, essayist and critic.

== Life ==
He was born in Hybe as the second of four kids to a family of dressmakers. He studied at school in Rožňava and Liptovský Mikuláš, and later at a technical high school in Bratislava. He completed his studies in 1934 at Czech Technical University in Prague. After that, he returned to Bratislava to work as a lecturer. Later, he worked as an editor of radio journalism at Czechoslovak Radio in Bratislava, and the last five years as the regional managing director for Slovakia. From 1946 he was a member of the Communist Party of Czechoslovakia. Chrobák died of a cancerous tumour after a failed surgery in Bratislava and is buried in Hybe.

== Selected works ==
- 1924 – Les, story
- 1925 – Náraz priam centrický, story
- 1931 – Dva kamenné dni, novel
- 1937 – Kamarát Jašek, collection of novels and stories
- 1943 – Drak sa vracia (Dragon's Return), fiction
