= Vyšná Boca =

- Municipality
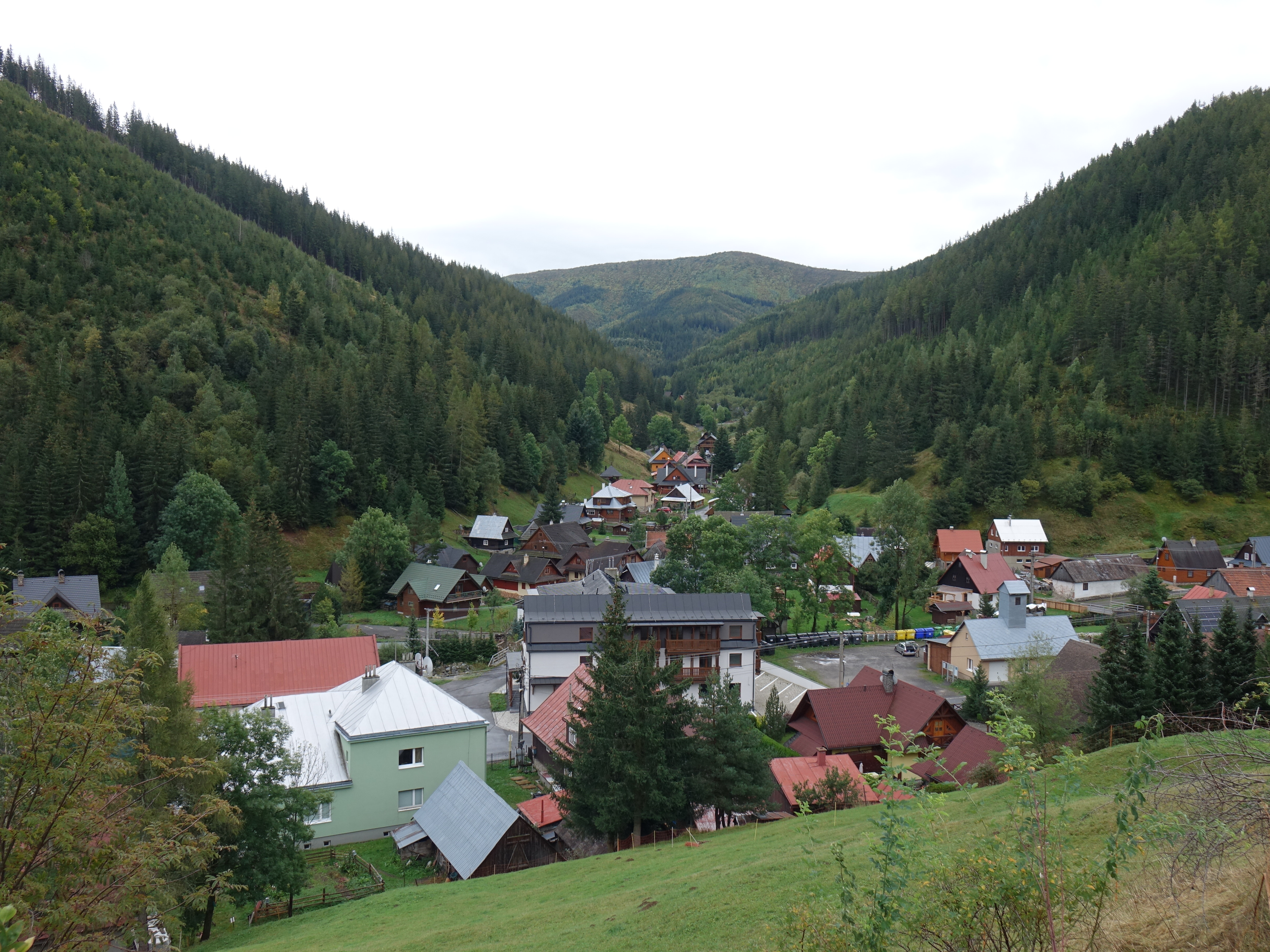

- Flag

- Location of Vyšná Boca in the Žilina Region Location of Vyšná Boca in Slovakia
- Coordinates: 48.93°N 19.75°E
- Country: Slovakia
- Region: Žilina Region
- District: Liptovský Mikuláš District
- First mentioned: 1850

Area
  - Total: 20.59 km^{2} (7.95 sq mi)
- Elevation: 953 m (3,127 ft)

Population (2025)
  - Total: 90
- Time zone: UTC+1 (CET)
  - Summer (DST): UTC+2 (CEST)
- Postal code: 323 4
- Area code: +421 44
- Vehicle registration plate (until 2022): LM
- Website: www.vysnaboca.sk

Vyšná Boca (Hungarian: Királyboca) is a village and municipality in Liptovský Mikuláš District in the Žilina Region of northern Slovakia.

== History ==
In historical records the village was first mentioned in 1262. Before the establishment of independent Czechoslovakia in 1918, it was part of Liptó County within the Kingdom of Hungary. From 1939 to 1945, it was part of the Slovak Republic.

== Geography ==
The municipality lies at an altitude of 953 metres (3,127 ft) and covers an area of 20.59 km^{2} (7.95 sq mi) (2025).

== Population ==
Population statistic (10 years)
Year	1995	2005	2015	2025
Count	104	109	104	90
Difference		+4.80%	−4.58%	−13.46%

Population statistic
Year	2024	2025
Count	93	90
Difference		−3.22%

It has a population of 90 people (31 December 2025).

=== Ethnicity ===
Census 2021 (1+ %)
Ethnicity	Number	Fraction
Slovak	103	97.16%
Other	3	2.83%
Total	106	

In year 2021 was 106 people by ethnicity 103 as Slovak, 3 as Other, 1 as Czech and 1 as Not found out.

Note on population: The difference values of population numbers in the table "Population statistic" and in the sections "Ethnicity" & "Religion" is caused by the use of various statistical methods.

=== Religion ===
Census 2021 (1+ %)
Religion	Number	Fraction
Evangelical Church	35	33.02%
None	34	32.08%
Roman Catholic Church	28	26.42%
Greek Catholic Church	5	4.72%
Total	106	

In year 2021 was 106 people by religion 35 from Evangelical Church, 34 from None, 28 from Roman Catholic Church, 5 from Greek Catholic Church, 1 from Eastern Orthodox Church, 1 from Not found out, 1 from United Methodist Church and 1 from Ad hoc movements.
