= Albert Škarvan =

Slovak author (1869–1926)

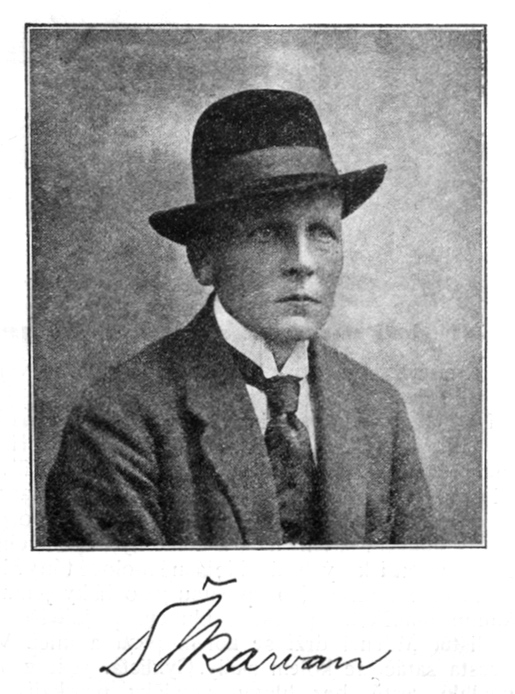
- Born: 31 January 1869; Tvrdošín, Austria-Hungary
- Died: 29 March 1926 (aged 57); Liptovský Hrádok, Czechoslovakia
- Writing career
- Language: Slovak; German; Esperanto; Russian; Hungarian

Albert Škarvan (31 January 1869 – 30 March 1926) was a Slovak physician, writer, translator, and Esperantist.

== Biography ==
Škarvan was born in Turdossin, Austria-Hungary (present-day Tvrdošín, Slovakia). He studied medicine in various towns in Upper Hungary from 1878 to 1886, in Budapest from 1886 to 1887, in Bohemia at the University of Prague from 1887 to 1891, and in Austria, Innsbruck from 1891 to 1894. He began work as a doctor in Košice (Kassa) in 1895 before moving to Russia in 1896, England in 1897, and Switzerland in 1898. In 1895, Škarvan was arrested for refusing military service. Škarvan was the personal doctor of Leo Tolstoy and translated some of his works. He began writing for the Medzinárodná spoločenská revue newspaper in 1906. In 1907, Škarvan published a Slovak translation of Fundamento de Esperanto in collaboration with N.P. Evstifeev as the first Slovak language Esperanto textbook. He represented Slovak Esperantists at the third World Esperanto Congress in 1907. Škarvan returned to Austria-Hungary in 1910, but he was arrested as a suspected spy in World War I and held until the end of the war. He died in 1926.

== Notable works ==
- Zápisky vojenského lekára (Notes of a Military Doctor, 1920)

== See also ==
- Esperanto in Slovakia
